= Flagstaff High School =

Public high school in Flagstaff, Arizona

Coordinates: 35.204456°N 111.650728°W

- Home of the Eagles

Location
- 400 West Elm; Flagstaff, Arizona 86001; United States

Information
- School type: Public high school
- Established: 1923 (103 years ago)
- School district: Flagstaff Unified School District
- CEEB code: 030105
- Principal: Libby Miller
- Teaching staff: 83.00 (FTE)
- Grades: 9–12
- Enrollment: 1,625 (2023–2024)
- Student to teacher ratio: 19.58
- Colors: Green and brown
- Mascot: Eagles
- Rival: Coconino High School
- Accreditation: North Central Association
- Website: fhs.fusd1.org

Flagstaff High School (FHS) is a secondary school in Flagstaff, Arizona. Flagstaff High School has been opened to the public since 1923. FHS is a four-year public high school of approximately 1,500 students. The students are primarily of five ethnic groups: White, Native American, Hispanic, Asian, and African-American. Approximately 50 percent of the students are minorities; 147 are from various Native American tribes and live at the Bureau of Indian Affairs KinLani Dormitory. The student body represents a broad socio-economic range from low income to upper middle class. Each year approximately 50 percent of the graduates enroll in four-year colleges and universities and 25 percent in two-year institutions.

== Attendance boundary and supplementary dormitory ==
In addition to sections of Flagstaff, the school serves sections of the Navajo Reservation: Birdsprings, Leupp, and Tolani Lake.

It also includes Bellemont, Fort Valley, Kachina Village, Mormon Lake, Mountainaire, Munds Park, and Oak Creek Canyon, as well as portions of Blue Ridge.

There is a tribally-controlled dormitory facility contracting with the Bureau of Indian Education (BIE), Flagstaff Bordertown Dormitory, which houses Native American students who attend Flagstaff High.

Prior to the establishment of Sedona-Oak Creek Unified School District, Flagstaff High directly included Sedona in its attendance boundary, and took students from the Red Rock school district, which did not operate any schools.

== Notable alumni ==
- Bruce Babbitt, 16th Governor of Arizona and US Secretary of the Interior during the Bill Clinton administration.
- Clifford Beck, Jr. (1946–1995), Navajo painter and illustrator.
- James Brooks (born 1988), professional defensive end and coach
- Tyler Gillett (born 1982), filmmaker and producer
- George Grantham (1900–1954), MLB player (Chicago Cubs, Pittsburgh Pirates, Cincinnati Reds, New York Giants)
- Yaotzin Meza, Arizona State Wrestling All-American and MMA fighter with the UFC.
- Michael Slobodchikoff, political science professor and media analyst.
- Amber Coffman, professional singer and songwriter
