= Sinagua High School =

Defunct school in Flagstaff, Arizona

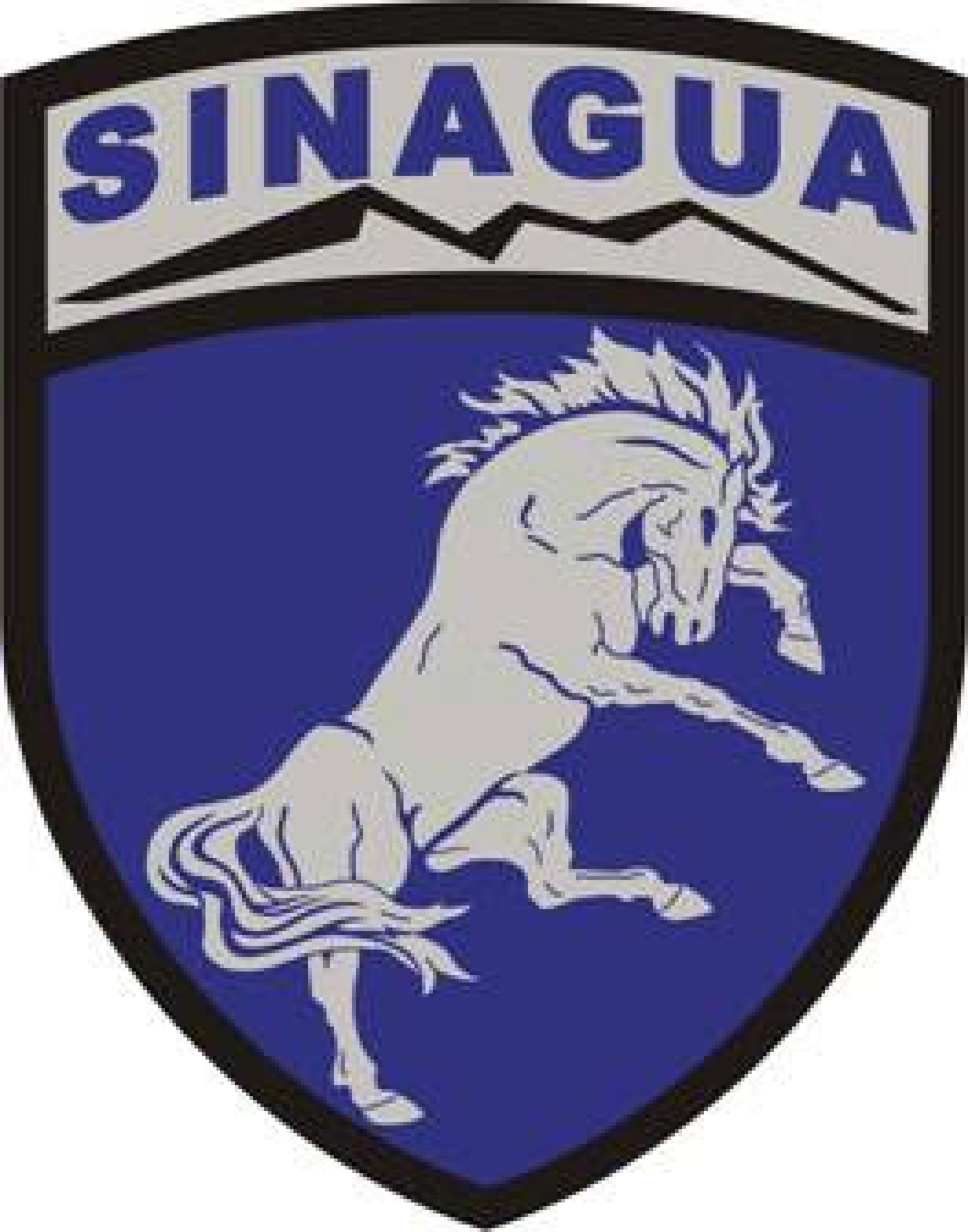

Information
- Established: 1989
- Closed: 2010
- Enrollment: c.960-1,070
- Colors: Royal blue and gray
- Mascot: Mustangs

Sinagua High School was the third public district high school in Flagstaff, Arizona. A part of the Flagstaff Unified School District, it opened in 1989 and was closed in 2010. Three other schools were also closed at the same time. The school's colors were royal blue and gray. The mascot was the Mustangs.

== History ==
In 1987 the board of trustees approved the groundbreaking of a third high school in Flagstaff USD. Sinagua HS was scheduled to take boundary areas from both Coconino and Flagstaff high schools upon its opening. There was a controversy over the selected name as some students called the school "Sin High".

=== Closure ===
Sinagua's enrollment had remained steady for years between 960 and 1,070 students, but enrollment elsewhere, such as at Coconino High School, was falling. The Flagstaff Unified School District closed Sinagua and three other schools for a US $2 million cost savings; it also converted the Sinagua campus for use as a middle school to serve grades six through eight. Both schools received enrollment boosts, but Coconino absorbed the majority of Sinagua students in what was called "The Merge". Sinagua students at Coconino's 2011 graduation wore silver and blue tassels, and a class banner (a Sinagua tradition) featuring Sinagua blue, Coconino red, and purple was presented.

== Notable alumni ==
- Katie Pavlich (2006), conservative political commentator and news editor of Townhall.com.
