= Coyote Springs =

Coyote Springs may refer to:

- Coyote Springs, Nevada, United States
- Coyote Springs, Arizona, United States
- Coyote Springs, a spring system in Tule Valley, Utah, United States
