= Winslow High School (Arizona) =

Public high school in Navajo County

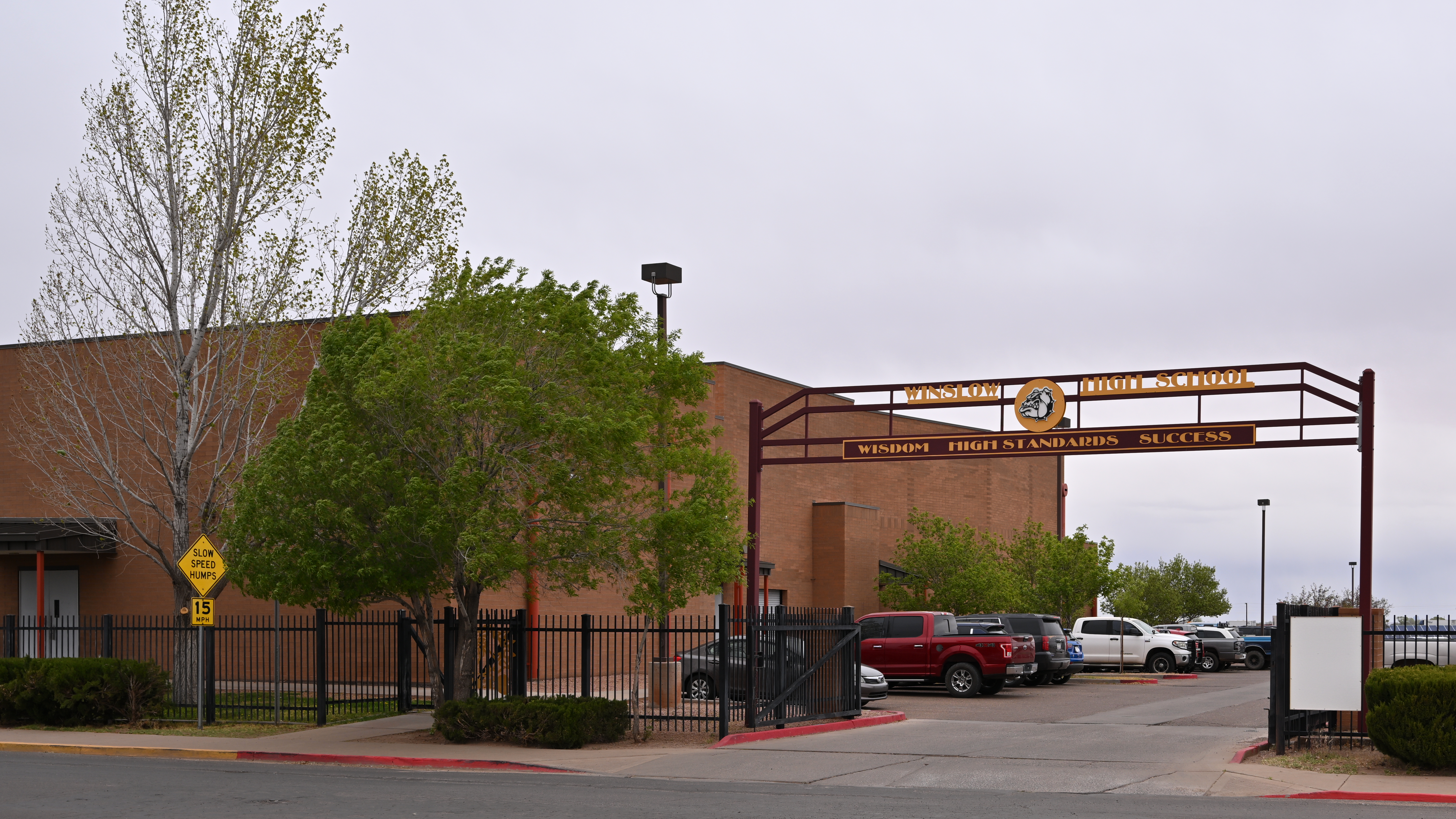
- Home of the Bulldogs

Location
- 600 E Cherry Ave; Winslow, Arizona 86047; United States; 35°01′44″N 110°41′20″W

Information
- School type: Public high school
- School district: Winslow Unified School District
- CEEB code: 030560
- Principal: Sal Hernandez
- Grades: 9-12
- Enrollment: 809 (2024-25)
- Colors: Maroon, white and gold
- Mascot: Bulldogs
- Rival: Holbrook High School
- Website: whs.wusd1.org

Winslow High School is a high school in Winslow, Arizona. It is the only high school under the jurisdiction of the Winslow Unified School District, which also includes Jefferson Elementary, Washington Elementary, Bonnie Brennan Elementary and Winslow Junior High School.

The district (which is the high school's attendance boundary) includes Winslow, the Navajo County portion of Winslow West, and a portion of Seba Dalkai. The Chevelon Butte School District, which does not operate any schools, previously sent its Blue Ridge area students to Winslow USD, with this high school included.

== Athletics ==
Winslow High School is a member of the Arizona Interscholastic Association 3A Conference. (The school has been in 3A for most of its existence, except for a time in the late 1960s through the early 1980s.) Winslow has won 31 state championships.

Sport	Year	Class
Baseball	1964	3A
Boys' Basketball	1979	4A
Girls' Basketball	1979	4A
Girls' Basketball	1989	3A
Girls' Basketball	1990	3A
Girls' Basketball	1998	3A
Girls' Basketball	2004	3A
Girls' Basketball	2005	3A
Girls' Basketball	2008	3A
Girls' Basketball	2010	3A
Girls' Basketball	2013	3A
Boys' Cross Country	1972	4A
Boys' Cross Country	1973	4A
Boys' Cross Country	1976	4A
Girls' Cross Country	1976	4A
Girls' Cross Country	1977	4A
Football	1964	3A
Softball	1988	3A
Softball	2010	3A
Boys' Track & Field	1972	4A
Boys' Track & Field	1973	4A
Boys' Track & Field	1978	4A
Boys' Track & Field	1979	4A
Boys' Track & Field	1989	3A
Boys' Track & Field	1999	3A
Volleyball	1983	4A
Wrestling	1981	4A
Wrestling	1982	4A
Wrestling	1985	3A
Wrestling	1986	3A
Wrestling	1987	3A
Wrestling	1988	3A
