= Fort Valley =

Fort Valley may refer to:

- Fort Valley, Arizona, United States
- Fort Valley, Georgia, United States
- Fort Valley, Virginia, United States

== See also ==
- Fort Valley High and Industrial School
