= Timberline-Fernwood, Arizona =

CDP in Coconino County, Arizona

- Census-designated place
- Location within Arizona Location within the United States
- Coordinates: 35°19′00″N 111°33′03″W
- Country: United States
- State: Arizona
- County: Coconino

Area
  - Total: 9.83 sq mi (25.47 km^{2})
  - Land: 9.83 sq mi (25.47 km^{2})
  - Water: 0 sq mi (0.00 km^{2})
- Elevation: 6,706 ft (2,044 m)

Population (2020)
  - Total: 2,572
  - Density: 260/sq mi (101/km^{2})
- Time zone: UTC-7 (MST)
  - Summer (DST): UTC-6 (MDT)
- ZIP Code: 86004 (Flagstaff)
- FIPS code: 04-73890
- GNIS feature ID: 2805231

Timberline-Fernwood is a census-designated place (CDP) in Coconino County, Arizona, United States. It is bordered to the south by the community of Doney Park and is on U.S. Route 89, 11 miles (18 km) northeast of Flagstaff. It was first listed as a CDP prior to the 2020 census.

== Demographics ==
Historical population
Census	Pop.	Note	%±
2020	2,572		—
U.S. Decennial Census

=== 2020 census ===
As of the 2020 census, Timberline-Fernwood had a population of 2,572. The median age was 44.9 years. 21.9% of residents were under the age of 18 and 18.5% of residents were 65 years of age or older. For every 100 females there were 97.1 males, and for every 100 females age 18 and over there were 93.5 males age 18 and over.

0.0% of residents lived in urban areas, while 100.0% lived in rural areas.

There were 892 households in Timberline-Fernwood, of which 32.1% had children under the age of 18 living in them. Of all households, 70.0% were married-couple households, 10.5% were households with a male householder and no spouse or partner present, and 14.8% were households with a female householder and no spouse or partner present. About 15.6% of all households were made up of individuals and 6.6% had someone living alone who was 65 years of age or older.

There were 1,012 housing units, of which 11.9% were vacant. The homeowner vacancy rate was 1.0% and the rental vacancy rate was 5.7%.

Racial composition as of the 2020 census
Race	Number	Percent
White	1,888	73.4%
Black or African American	11	0.4%
American Indian and Alaska Native	272	10.6%
Asian	10	0.4%
Native Hawaiian and Other Pacific Islander	3	0.1%
Some other race	99	3.8%
Two or more races	289	11.2%
Hispanic or Latino (of any race)	344	13.4%

== Education ==
Timberline-Fernwood is within the Flagstaff Unified School District. The zoned secondary schools are Sinagua Middle School and Coconino High School.
