= Sedona Red Rock Junior Senior High School =

Coordinates: 34°50′47″N 111°49′51″W

Location
- 995 Upper Red Rock Loop Road; Sedona, Arizona 86336; United States

Information
- School type: Public middle school/Public high school
- Established: 1994 (32 years ago)
- School district: Sedona-Oak Creek Unified School District
- CEEB code: 030408
- Principal: Heather Isom
- Teaching staff: 26.47 (FTE)
- Grades: 7–12
- Enrollment: 408 (2024–2025)
- Student to teacher ratio: 15.41
- Colors: Purple, silver and black
- Mascot: Scorpions
- Website: rrhs.sedonak12.org

Sedona Red Rock Junior Senior High School, formerly Sedona Red Rock High School (SRRHS), is a middle and high school in Sedona, Arizona. It is part of the Sedona-Oak Creek Unified School District.

The district (of which, this is the sole comprehensive secondary school) includes Sedona, as well as Village of Oak Creek (Big Park). It also includes Red Rock.

== History ==
In September 1994 the school began operations. It first graduation ceremony occurred in 1997.

== Notable alumni ==
- Brittani Louise Taylor - author, actress & YouTube personality
- Samaire Armstrong - Actress
