= Clifford Beck =

American painter (1946–1995)

- Born: January 11, 1946; Keams Canyon, Arizona
- Died: October 16, 1995 (aged 49); Scottsdale, Arizona
- Burial place: Citizens Cemetery, Flagstaff, Arizona
- Education: California College of Arts and Crafts
- Occupations: painter, illustrator, photographer

Clifford Beck Jr. (January 11, 1946 – October 16, 1995) was a Navajo American painter, illustrator, photographer and educator born in Keams Canyon, Arizona. He exhibited his work across the United States and is known for his work in oils and pastels, particularly his portraits of older native people.

== Early life ==
Beck was the son of Clifford Beck, a tribal councilman, and Ester Yellowhair, a weaver. A member of the Tl'izilani and Ashiihi clans, he grew up on the Navajo indian reservation. As a child, he attended school at the Piñon Boarding School and Holbrook Elementary School. In summertime, he would return to the reservation to help with livestock.

He graduated from Flagstaff High School in 1963. Beck then earned a tribal scholarship to attend the California College of Arts and Crafts. While there, he was introduced to Impressionist artist Edgar Degas, whom he considered a significant influence on his work. Beck was also encouraged in his work by painter R. C. Gorman and shared a show with Patrick Swazo Hinds. He continued to return home for summer, taking various jobs including as an illustrator for the Navajo Times.

== Career ==
After graduating in 1968, Beck worked as a designer for the Indian Health Service in Arizona. Beginning in 1971, he worked for a time as an art instructor at the Navajo Community College.

By 1980, Beck was able to work as a fine artist full time. At first, many of his portraits were of his relatives. He often depicted elderly people. He said, "I prefer to paint the older people, the more traditional ones who have retained our culture and have persevered in spite of the influences and pressures from the modern world around them."

In addition to his fine art portraits, Beck contributed illustrations to a number of books for the Navajo Curriculum Center Press, such as Grandfather Stories of the Navajos in 1968. He collaborated on these books with other Navajo artists like Andy Tsinajinnie and Hoke Denetsosie. Beck was also an influence on contemporary artist Gary Yazzie.

Beck had a studio in Flagstaff called Taz, which published some of his works as prints and lithographs.

At age 49, Beck died of cancer in Flagstaff, Arizona, on October 16, 1995. His death followed a long illness. In his last days, he helped develop a retrospective exhibit at the Wheelwright Museum of the American Indian, called A Quiet Pride: The Art of Clifford Beck.

He is buried in the Citizens Cemetery in Flagstaff. His gravestone includes the epitaph "In beauty it is finished."
