= Flagstaff Unified School District =

Primary school district in Arizona

Location
- Flagstaff, Coconino County, Arizona; United States of America

District information
- Grades: PK-12
- President: Dorothy Denetsosie Gishie
- Superintendent: Michael A. Penca
- Asst. superintendent(s): Kurt Steele; Lance Huffman
- NCES District ID: 0402860
- District ID: AZ-4192

Students and staff
- Students: 9,106 (2021-2022 school year)
- Student–teacher ratio: 16.36
- Colors: Blue and White

Other information
- Website: fusd1.org

The Flagstaff Unified School District (FUSD) is a K-12 school district for Flagstaff, Arizona area and neighboring areas. The district has approximately 11,500 students and operates 16 schools; including three high schools (9–12), two middle schools (6–8), four magnet schools (various grades), ten elementary schools, and two alternative programs.

== History ==
The Sedona-Oak Creek Unified School District opened in 1991, taking territory and assets from FUSD. At the time, Sedona students continued to attend Flagstaff for high school.

== Boundary ==
The district boundary consists of portions of Coconino County. It includes all of Flagstaff. Additionally, the district includes the following census-designated places: Bellemont, Doney Park, Fort Valley, Kachina Village, Leupp, Mormon Lake, Mountain View Ranches, Mountainaire, Munds Park, Oak Creek Canyon, and Timberline-Fernwood, as well as portions of Blue Ridge and the Coconino County portion of Winslow West.

Prior to the establishment of Sedona-Oak Creek Unified School District, Flagstaff USD directly included all of Sedona, and took students from the Red Rock school district, which did not operate any schools.

== List of schools ==
=== High schools ===
- Coconino High School
- Flagstaff High School
- Summit High School

=== Middle schools ===
- Mount Elden Middle School
- Sinagua Middle School

=== Alternative schools ===
- Teenage Parent Program (TAPP)

=== Magnet schools ===
- Advanced Placement Academy at Flagstaff High School
- Honors Pre-AP Academy at Mount Elden Middle School
- Alpine Academy at Mount Elden Middle School
- Coconino Institute of Technology (located inside of Coconino High School)
- The Middle School Institute of Technology and Engineering, or MIT-e (located inside of Sinagua Middle School)
- Marshall Elementary Arts and Science Magnet
- Puente de Hozho Bilingual Elementary
- Northern Arizona Distance Learning (on-line)

=== Elementary schools ===
- Cromer
- DeMiguel
- Killip
- Kinsey
- Knoles
- Leupp
  - Leupp Public School is in Leupp, 45 miles (72 km) northeast of Flagstaff. It is a K-5 elementary school. As of 2018 all of the students are Native American. In addition to Leupp its attendance zone includes Birdsprings and Tolani Lake. The sole FUSD school in the Navajo reservation, it was previously a K-8 school. According to Mitch Strohmann, the public relations official at FUSD, the school, in 2002, had "made some amazing strides in recent years." Construction on the current campus was scheduled to start in summer 2002. Within the campus, which had a cost of $2.8 million, is a hogan that was dedicated in January 2002. FUSD consulted with the school community on the design of the school.
- Marshall
  - Before the Kinlani Dormitory (now the Flagstaff Bordertown Dormitory), a Bureau of Indian Affairs (BIE)-contracting dormitory, stopped taking younger students, it sent younger children living there to Marshall Elementary.
- Puente de Hozho
- Sechrist
- Thomas

=== Former schools ===
Closed schools with year of closure:

- Sinagua High School (2010)
- Flagstaff Middle School (2010)
- Christensen Elementary School (2010)
- South Beaver Elementary School (2010)

Flagstaff USD formerly operated Sedona School in Sedona. That school went to the Sedona-Oak Creek Unified School District.
