= Ash Fork Joint Unified School District =

School district in Arizona, United States

Ash Fork Unified School District 31

Location
- PO Box 247; Ash Fork, Arizona 86320 United States

Other information
- Website: www.afjusd.org

Ash Fork Unified School District 31 is a public school district headquartered in Ash Fork, Arizona, United States.

In addition to serving Ash Fork in Yavapai County, it also serves Kaibab Estates West in Coconino County.

The District includes Ash Fork High School.

In 1984 the district had 136 pupils, with 14 on the teaching staff. The previous year the school district lost a teacher and stopped paying for food for student athletes since it had a $36,000 budget deficit. In 1988 the district had 177 students.

Some areas formerly in the Williams Unified School District were later a part of the Ash Fork district.

Notable alumni and faculty:

Lee Patton, legendary Hall of Fame coach at West Virginia University, and former teacher and coach at Ash Fork School from 1927 to 1929.
