= Northland Preparatory Academy =

Public charter high school in Flagstaff, Arizona

Coordinates: 35.199491°N 111.606094°W

Location
- 3300 E. Sparrow Ave. Flagstaff, Arizona, Coconino County, Arizona 86004; United States

Information
- School type: Public charter high school
- Established: 1996
- Superintendent: David Lykins
- CEEB code: 030111
- Principal: Vada Visocki
- Grades: 6–12
- Enrollment: High school: 301 (October 1, 2012)
- Colors: Blue, maroon and black
- Mascot: Spartans
- Accreditation: North Central Association
- Website: northlandprep.org

Northland Preparatory Academy is a public charter high school and middle school in Flagstaff, Arizona. It aims to provide a college preparatory environment and alternative to public high schools in the area. The courses include various regular, AP, and honors classes, which include World History, American history, Geography, Mathematics, English, Psychology, and various sciences.

== Accolades ==
Northland Preparatory Academy is currently the 435th ranked high school in the nation, as well as the 16th ranked high school in Arizona. NPA is also the 469th best school in Arizona.
