= Mountainaire, Arizona =

CDP in Coconino County, Arizona

- CDP
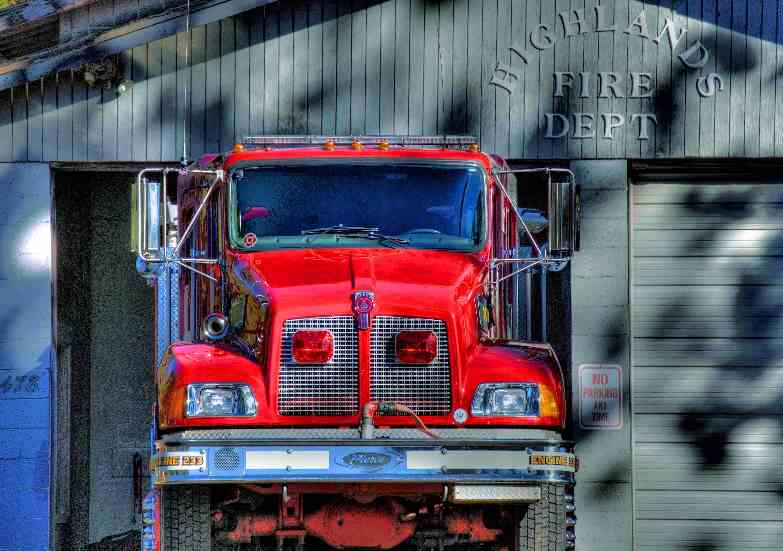
- Mountainaire Fire Station

- Location in Coconino County and the state of Arizona

- Location in the United States
- Coordinates: 35°05′30″N 111°38′57″W
- Country: United States
- State: Arizona
- County: Coconino

Area
  - Total: 10.20 sq mi (26.43 km^{2})
  - Land: 10.20 sq mi (26.43 km^{2})
  - Water: 0.0039 sq mi (0.01 km^{2})
- Elevation: 6,952 ft (2,119 m)

Population (2020)
  - Total: 1,068
  - Density: 104.7/sq mi (40.41/km^{2})
- Time zone: UTC-7 (MST)
- ZIP code: 86005
- Area code: 928
- FIPS code: 04-47820
- GNIS feature ID: 2408886

Mountainaire is a census-designated place (CDP) in Coconino County, Arizona, United States. The population was 1,119 at the 2010 census.

== Geography ==
According to the United States Census Bureau, the CDP has a total area of 10.2 square miles (26.5 km^{2}), all land.

Mountainaire CDP includes Kachina Hills and Mountainaire subdivisions, and nearby areas.

=== Climate ===
This region experiences warm (but not hot) and dry summers, with no average monthly temperatures above 71.6 °F. According to the Köppen Climate Classification system, Mountainaire has a warm-summer Mediterranean climate, abbreviated "Csb" on climate maps.

== Demographics ==
Historical population
Census	Pop.	Note	%±
2020	1,068		—
U.S. Decennial Census

=== 2020 census ===
As of the 2020 census, Mountainaire had a population of 1,068. The median age was 41.0 years. 18.2% of residents were under the age of 18 and 14.3% of residents were 65 years of age or older. For every 100 females there were 104.6 males, and for every 100 females age 18 and over there were 103.7 males age 18 and over.

0.0% of residents lived in urban areas, while 100.0% lived in rural areas.

There were 485 households in Mountainaire, of which 18.1% had children under the age of 18 living in them. Of all households, 45.6% were married-couple households, 22.5% were households with a male householder and no spouse or partner present, and 19.4% were households with a female householder and no spouse or partner present. About 32.2% of all households were made up of individuals and 11.4% had someone living alone who was 65 years of age or older.

There were 629 housing units, of which 22.9% were vacant. The homeowner vacancy rate was 1.8% and the rental vacancy rate was 3.4%.

Racial composition as of the 2020 census
Race	Number	Percent
White	908	85.0%
Black or African American	0	0.0%
American Indian and Alaska Native	30	2.8%
Asian	8	0.7%
Native Hawaiian and Other Pacific Islander	1	0.1%
Some other race	26	2.4%
Two or more races	95	8.9%
Hispanic or Latino (of any race)	129	12.1%

=== 2000 census ===
As of the census of 2000, there were 1,014 people, 417 households, and 246 families living in the CDP. The population density was 99.2 inhabitants per square mile (38.3/km^{2}). There were 556 housing units at an average density of 54.4 per square mile (21.0/km^{2}). The racial makeup of the CDP was 86.1% White, 0.3% Black or African American, 7.7% Native American, 0.3% Asian, 0.1% Pacific Islander, 3.1% from other races, and 2.5% from two or more races. 6.6% of the population were Hispanic or Latino of any race.

There were 417 households, out of which 31.4% had children under the age of 18 living with them, 46.8% were married couples living together, 8.2% had a female householder with no husband present, and 41.0% were non-families. 26.6% of all households were made up of individuals, and 4.1% had someone living alone who was 65 years of age or older. The average household size was 2.43 and the average family size was 3.04.

In the CDP, the age distribution of the population shows 24.7% under the age of 18, 8.5% from 18 to 24, 39.6% from 25 to 44, 23.5% from 45 to 64, and 3.7% who were 65 years of age or older. The median age was 33 years. For every 100 females, there were 110.4 males. For every 100 females age 18 and over, there were 107.6 males.

The median income for a household in the CDP was $41,250, and the median income for a family was $49,355. Males had a median income of $32,406 versus $27,125 for females. The per capita income for the CDP was $23,625. About 5.3% of families and 7.4% of the population were below the poverty line, including 10.9% of those under age 18 and none of those age 65 or over.

== Education ==
Mountainaire is within the Flagstaff Unified School District. The zoned secondary schools are Mount Elden Middle School and Flagstaff High School.
