= South Beaver Elementary School =

Historic school in Flagstaff, Arizona

Coordinates: 35.192049°N 111.652706°W

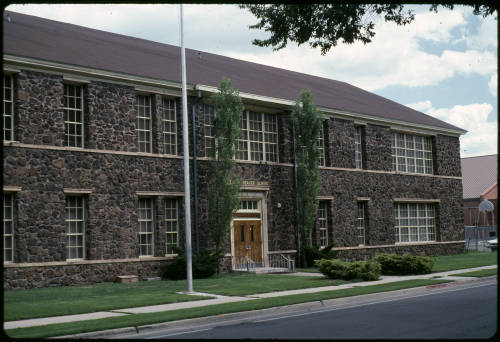

Information
- Established: May 1935
- Founders: Civilian Conservation Corps
- Closed: 2010
- School district: Flagstaff Unified School District
- NCES District ID: 0402860

South Beaver Elementary School was an elementary school in Flagstaff, Arizona. The school was a part of Flagstaff Unified School District (FUSD) up until its closure in 2010. However, the school was leased, and later purchased, by Northern Arizona University (NAU) and is now used for the intensive English program for non-native English speakers.

== History ==
Created in May 1935 by the Civilian Conservation Corps (CCC), South Beaver Elementary was a segregated school for Hispanic students, and later African-American students after the closure of Dunbar School, and remained segregated up until the 1950s. The school was primarily dominated by said ethnic groups until its closure.

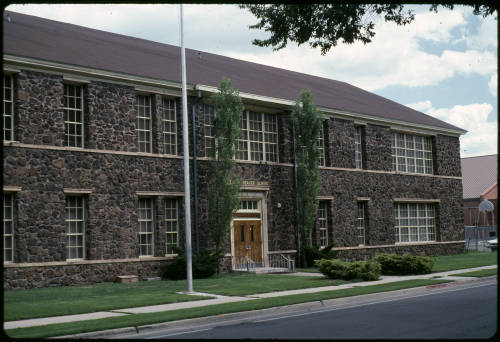
South Beaver Elementary School

South Beaver has had close relations with NAU since the 1940s with NAU students helping to teach and tutor at South Beaver to NAU donating 18 Macintosh SE computers to the school in 1995. In 1946, the school participated in a school safety patrol with the 20–30 Club in order to bring awareness to general student safety as students get to and from school.

South Beaver was the oldest and smallest school building FUSD owned and was the first magnet school the district offered.

Before the Kinlani Dormitory (now the Flagstaff Bordertown Dormitory), a Bureau of Indian Affairs (BIE)-contracting dormitory, stopped taking younger students, it sent younger children living there to South Beaver Elementary.

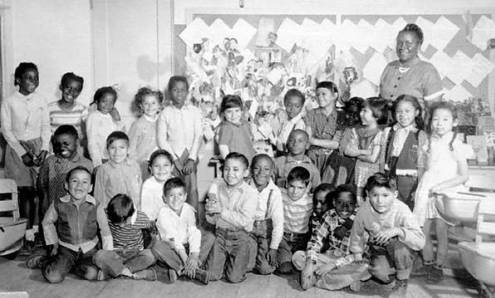
First Grade Class
