= Fort Valley, Arizona =

CDP in Coconino County, Arizona

- census-designated place
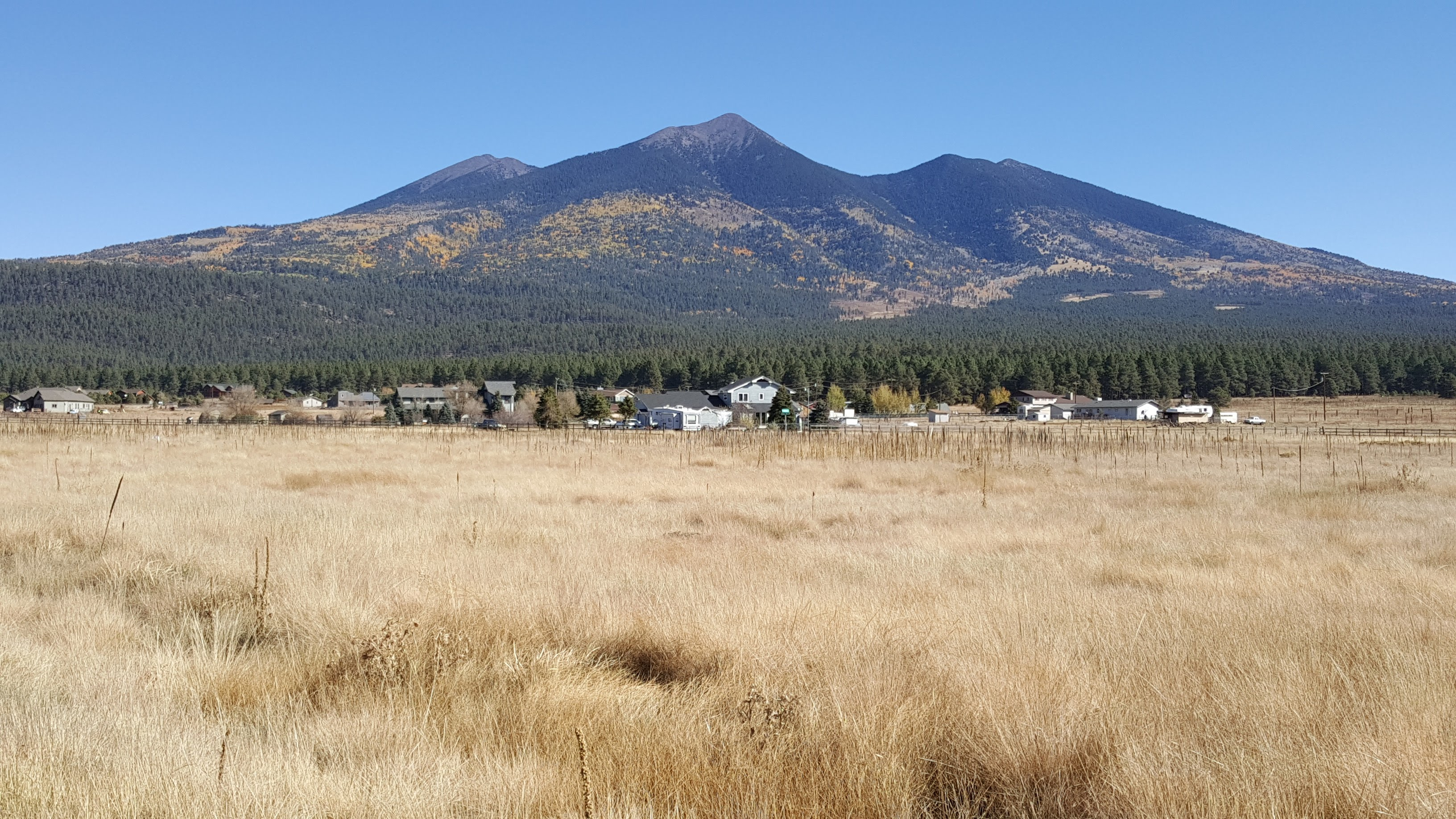

- Location of Fort Valley in Coconino County, Arizona.

- Location in the United States
- Coordinates: 35°19′22″N 111°44′23″W
- Country: United States
- State: Arizona
- County: Coconino

Area
  - Total: 72.45 sq mi (187.65 km^{2})
  - Land: 72.45 sq mi (187.65 km^{2})
  - Water: 0 sq mi (0.00 km^{2})
- Elevation: 8,376 ft (2,553 m)

Population (2020)
  - Total: 1,682
  - Density: 23.2/sq mi (8.96/km^{2})
- Time zone: UTC-7 (MST (no daylight saving time))
- Area code: 928
- FIPS code: 04-25045
- GNIS feature ID: 2582786

Fort Valley is a census-designated place in the southern portion of Coconino County in the state of Arizona, United States. Fort Valley is located on the border with the city of Flagstaff. The population as of 2010, was 779.

== History ==
Fort Valley is a historical settlement at the base of Mt. Agassiz in Flagstaff, Arizona. It gained its name as a fort that was established to defend against Apache tribes although it was never actually used. Wagon trains migrating from the east came upon Flagstaff and settled here. Many of the old settlements can still be seen today. The primary motivation for this settlement was logging as was true for the rest of Flagstaff. The ponderosa pine forest supplied abundant amounts of timber which were then transported via railroad.

The first Fort Valley settlers were Laura and William Murphy in 1881, they belonged to the church of Jesus Christ of Latter Day Saints. After these first settlers many more followed. Eventually a small community was developed and Fort Valley became a ranching hub in northern Arizona. As ranching took hold in Fort Valley the effect on the environment was devastating. Water sources such as Leroux spring ran dark with silt and the land was becoming a victim of overgrazing. In 1908 Gustaf Adolf Pearson arrived in Fort Valley as a member of the forest service and began to revive the area.

Fort Valley was also a popular hub for the scientific community to collect data on recently obtained land in the Southwest. Because of the unique combination of a desert and a mountain environment the area was particularly interesting for geologists, paleontologists, and scientists alike.

=== Present ===
Fort Valley remains a settlement today. The suburb of Flagstaff Arizona still holds a number of small farms and ranches. The Leroux spring has been taken over by the city of Flagstaff and the city is considering it as a potential water source. Fort Valley remains a wide open meadow at the base of what is now Snowbowl Road. Much of the past wildlife such as deer, herons, and elk remain in the area.

== Demographics ==
Historical population
Census	Pop.	Note	%±
2020	1,682		—
U.S. Decennial Census

=== 2020 census ===
As of the 2020 census, Fort Valley had a population of 1,682. The median age was 45.2 years. 22.3% of residents were under the age of 18 and 20.0% of residents were 65 years of age or older. For every 100 females there were 96.5 males, and for every 100 females age 18 and over there were 95.1 males age 18 and over.

0.0% of residents lived in urban areas, while 100.0% lived in rural areas.

There were 616 households in Fort Valley, of which 30.8% had children under the age of 18 living in them. Of all households, 73.2% were married-couple households, 9.9% were households with a male householder and no spouse or partner present, and 10.2% were households with a female householder and no spouse or partner present. About 12.6% of all households were made up of individuals and 4.7% had someone living alone who was 65 years of age or older.

There were 780 housing units, of which 21.0% were vacant. The homeowner vacancy rate was 1.7% and the rental vacancy rate was 12.9%.

Racial composition as of the 2020 census
Race	Number	Percent
White	1,515	90.1%
Black or African American	4	0.2%
American Indian and Alaska Native	11	0.7%
Asian	12	0.7%
Native Hawaiian and Other Pacific Islander	0	0.0%
Some other race	22	1.3%
Two or more races	118	7.0%
Hispanic or Latino (of any race)	149	8.9%

== Climate ==
According to the Köppen Climate Classification system, Fort Valley has a dry-summer humid continental climate, abbreviated "Dsb" on climate maps.

Climate data for Fort Valley, Arizona (1991–2020 normals, extremes 1909–2018)
Month	Jan	Feb	Mar	Apr	May	Jun	Jul	Aug	Sep	Oct	Nov	Dec	Year
Record high °F (°C)	65 (18)	70 (21)	76 (24)	80 (27)	90 (32)	97 (36)	101 (38)	96 (36)	90 (32)	85 (29)	75 (24)	69 (21)	101 (38)
Mean maximum °F (°C)	57.2 (14.0)	59.5 (15.3)	66.3 (19.1)	73.3 (22.9)	81.3 (27.4)	89.8 (32.1)	91.3 (32.9)	87.2 (30.7)	82.7 (28.2)	76.0 (24.4)	67.7 (19.8)	60.0 (15.6)	92.7 (33.7)
Mean daily maximum °F (°C)	46.3 (7.9)	48.1 (8.9)	54.4 (12.4)	62.0 (16.7)	70.8 (21.6)	81.6 (27.6)	83.6 (28.7)	81.3 (27.4)	76.0 (24.4)	65.9 (18.8)	54.9 (12.7)	45.9 (7.7)	64.2 (17.9)
Daily mean °F (°C)	31.6 (−0.2)	33.8 (1.0)	39.1 (3.9)	44.5 (6.9)	51.7 (10.9)	60.6 (15.9)	66.5 (19.2)	65.1 (18.4)	58.4 (14.7)	48.0 (8.9)	38.7 (3.7)	31.2 (−0.4)	47.4 (8.6)
Mean daily minimum °F (°C)	16.9 (−8.4)	19.6 (−6.9)	23.7 (−4.6)	27.1 (−2.7)	32.7 (0.4)	39.6 (4.2)	49.3 (9.6)	49.2 (9.6)	40.8 (4.9)	30.1 (−1.1)	22.5 (−5.3)	16.4 (−8.7)	30.7 (−0.7)
Mean minimum °F (°C)	−5.9 (−21.1)	−1.7 (−18.7)	5.7 (−14.6)	12.8 (−10.7)	19.9 (−6.7)	26.2 (−3.2)	34.6 (1.4)	36.2 (2.3)	25.9 (−3.4)	15.7 (−9.1)	3.8 (−15.7)	−4.9 (−20.5)	−9.1 (−22.8)
Record low °F (°C)	−37 (−38)	−32 (−36)	−22 (−30)	−7 (−22)	6 (−14)	19 (−7)	25 (−4)	20 (−7)	11 (−12)	−9 (−23)	−16 (−27)	−30 (−34)	−37 (−38)
Average precipitation inches (mm)	2.10 (53)	2.47 (63)	1.81 (46)	0.90 (23)	0.89 (23)	0.23 (5.8)	2.78 (71)	3.38 (86)	1.82 (46)	1.28 (33)	1.33 (34)	1.61 (41)	20.60 (523)
Average snowfall inches (cm)	10.6 (27)	8.4 (21)	2.8 (7.1)	1.1 (2.8)	0.0 (0.0)	0.1 (0.25)	0.0 (0.0)	0.0 (0.0)	0.0 (0.0)	0.4 (1.0)	1.8 (4.6)	5.2 (13)	30.4 (77)
Average precipitation days (≥ 0.01 inch)	7.6	8.6	6.6	4.5	4.2	2.2	11.2	13.1	7.5	4.8	4.5	6.8	81.6
Average snowy days (≥ 0.1 inch)	3.3	3.6	1.0	0.6	0.0	0.0	0.0	0.0	0.0	0.3	0.6	1.6	11.0
Source: National Oceanic and Atmospheric Administration

== Education ==
It is in the Flagstaff Unified School District.

The zoned secondary schools are Mount Elden Middle School and Flagstaff High School.

== See also ==
- Coyote Springs, Arizona and Colton House, nearby, home of research on ponderosa pines
