= Seba Dalkai, Arizona =

- CDP
- Location within the state of Arizona Seba Dalkai (the United States)
- Coordinates: 35°29′44″N 110°27′32″W
- Country: United States
- State: Arizona
- County: Navajo

Area
  - Total: 15.13 sq mi (39.19 km^{2})
  - Land: 15.13 sq mi (39.19 km^{2})
  - Water: 0 sq mi (0.00 km^{2})
- Elevation: 5,916 ft (1,803 m)

Population (2020)
  - Total: 126
  - Density: 8.3/sq mi (3.22/km^{2})
- Time zone: UTC-7 (MST)
- ZIP code: 86047
- Area code: 928
- FIPS code: 04-65167
- GNIS feature ID: 2582863

Seba Dalkai is a census-designated place (CDP) located in Navajo County, Arizona, United States. The population was 136 at the 2010 census.

== Geography ==
The CDP has a total area of 15.13 square miles (39.2 km^{2}), all land.

== Demographics ==
Historical population
Census	Pop.	Note	%±
2020	126		—
U.S. Decennial Census

As of the 2010 census, there were 136 people living in the CDP: 63 male and 73 female. 31 were 19 years old or younger, 29 were ages 20–34, 24 were between the ages of 35 and 49, 28 were between 50 and 64, and the remaining 24 were aged 65 and above. The median age was 54.7 years.

The racial makeup of the CDP was 93.4% Indian and 6.6% White.

There were 48 households in the CDP, 25 family households (52.1%) and 23 non-family households (47.9%), with an average household size of 2.83. Of the family households, 19 were married couples living together, while there was 1 single father and 5 single mothers; the non-family households included 22 adults living alone: 12 male and 10 female.

The CDP contained 57 housing units, of which 48 were occupied and 9 were vacant.

As of July 2016, the average home value in Seba Dalkai was $104,861. The average household income was $35,954, with a per capita income of $10,227.

== Education ==
Much of it is in the Winslow Unified School District. A portion is not in any school district. The Winslow district operates Winslow High School.
