= Coconino High School =

Public secondary school in Flagstaff, Arizona

- Home of the Panthers

Location
- 2801 North Izabel Street; Flagstaff, Arizona 86004; United States; 35°12′57″N 111°37′24″W

Information
- Type: Public, Secondary
- Motto: Pride, Spirit, Unity, Diversity and Educational Excellence
- Established: 1967 (59 years ago)
- School district: Flagstaff Unified School District
- CEEB code: 030103
- Principal: Tadd Ragan
- Teaching staff: 80.30 (FTE)
- Grades: 9–12
- Enrollment: 1,506 (2023–2024)
- Student to teacher ratio: 18.75
- Colors: Black and red
- Mascot: Panthers
- Rival: Flagstaff High School
- Website: chs.fusd1.org

Coconino High School (CHS) is a public secondary school located in Flagstaff, Arizona (US). It is part of the Flagstaff Unified School District and is one of the district's two high schools.

Located at 2801 North Izabel Street, Coconino High School serves students in grades nine through twelve and currently enrolls 1,446 students as of 2012.

The school's mascot is the panther.

== History ==
The school first opened its doors in September 1967 to grades 10-12. The school's namesake is the name of the county in which it is located, Coconino County. The campus was designed by Guirey Srnka & Arnold. Construction was undertaken by Del E. Webb Corporation. Since its founding, the school building has been remodeled twice, once in 1977 and then again in 1989 (when FUSD added ninth graders to its high schools).

In the late 1960s the Kinlani Dormitory (now the Flagstaff Bordertown Dormitory), a Bureau of Indian Education-affiliated dormitory for Native American students, sent some of the boarders to Coconino High.

== Neighborhoods served ==
Coconino High School serves east Flagstaff neighborhoods.

The school also serves the northern and eastern outlying suburbs and rural areas nearby, such as Doney Park, Mountain View Ranches, Timberline-Fernwood, the Coconino County portion of Winslow West, and Winona.

== Statistics ==
Ethnicity	Percentage
White American/ Non-Hispanic	43%
Native American	23%
Native American/White or Alaskan Native/White	2%
Hispanic American with 2 or more races	11%
Hispanic ethnicity/ White	9%
Hispanic ethnicity/American Indian or Alaskan Native	7%
American Indian or Alaskan Native/Black	<5%
Native American or Alaskan Native with 2 or more races	<5%
Black	<5%
Black/White	<5%
Hispanic ethnicity/Black	<5%
Asian	<5%
Asian/White	<5%
Asian/Native Hawaiian or other Pacific Islander	<5%
Native Hawaiian or other Pacific Islander	<5%

Coconino High School has a student to teacher ratio of 31.2 to 1. Eighty-two percent of the school's faculty has ten or more years of teaching experience.

== Extracurricular activities ==
=== Athletics ===
Coconino High School also has a host of athletic teams such as (Men's) Football, (Men's and Women's) Basketball, (Men's and Women's) Soccer, (Women's) Volleyball, (Men's) Baseball, (Women's) Softball, (Men's and Women's) Tennis, (Men's and Women's) Cross Country/ Track and Field, Men's Wrestling, and (Men's) Golf. Coconino High School and Flagstaff High School have had a rivalry since the school opened. The two schools play each other in football at the City Championship game (located at Northern Arizona University's Walkup Skydome), which is the last game of the regular season for both schools.

=== Clubs ===
Coconino High School maintains a variety of clubs for students to participate in. Activities offered include the Coconino High School Student Council, SkillsUSA, Drama Club, Asian Cultural Club, the Coconino High School chapter of the National Honor Society, and the Native American Club. Coconino High School is also home to FIRST Robotics Competition Team 2486 "CocoNuts", the first and only FRC team in Flagstaff, AZ. They have garnered acclaim by qualifying for the World Championship every year since their establishment in the 2007–08 school year, as well as winning the highly prestigious FIRST Impact Award and being inducted into the FIRST Hall of Fame at the 2024 Championship. The school hosts an Army Junior ROTC battalion, which it picked up from the closed Sinagua High School. Coconino High School is known prominently in the community for its one-of-a-kind Brawl Stars Club. For those who aren’t interested in things like robotics or coconuts, the Brawl Stars Club is a fun place to hang out, eat lunch, and play Brawl Stars. As of right now the resident president is ShrekWazowski (2025)

=== Performing arts ===
CHS has several performing arts programs: Marching Band (during the football season)/ Symphonic Band (after football season), two-tiered Choir, Orchestra, and the Drama Club.

==== Band ====
The Coconino High School Band (both marching and concert) are award-winning; consistently receiving ratings: Superior to Superior with Distinction at marching band and symphonic band competitions over Arizona, Nevada, and California. In addition, many band members audition for the Northwest Region AMEA Honor Band, of which a majority are accepted. Of those, several students audition for the Arizona Music Educators Association All-State Honor Band.

== Coconino Institute of Technology ==
The Coconino Institute of Technology (CIT) is a three-year-long accelerated science and technology program (sometimes accredited as a magnet school) within Coconino High School.

Students who enter the CIT program commit to attaining the following goals by graduation: achieving an ACT score of at least 29 or an SAT score of at least 1300 (Critical reading and mathematics sections), engaging in four years of career exploration through partnerships with current industry professionals and institutions of higher learning, completing at least five college or university applications, completing at least one scholarship application, and gaining acceptance into a college or university. The CIT curriculum allows students to complete all three major sciences required for Arizona public university admission at a pre-AP (honors) level within two years (Physics, Biology, and Chemistry). CIT students also complete an in-depth semester long project their senior fall semester on a topic of their choice.

Though CIT is a three-year program, students may choose to not continue. When a student does make this decision, they may not re-enter into the program.

=== Acceptance into CIT ===
Before entering high school, prospective students must apply; acceptance into CIT is based upon an entrance assessment (math), middle school GPA, teacher recommendations, and a writing sample completed at the time of testing. The entrance test is conducted every year in mid-April, however only incoming Freshmen may apply.

=== Current CIT three-year schedule ===
The CIT schedule is continuously evolving. This is the current four-year schedule for 2015 graduates.

==== Freshman year ====
- Pre-AP Physics
- Pre-AP Biology
- Pre-AP Engineering I

==== Sophomore year ====
- Pre-AP Chemistry
- Pre-AP Engineering II

==== Junior year ====
- Academic Symposium (spring semester) Research Project (fall semester)

== Notable alumni ==
- Kyle Lobstein – American baseball player (born 1989)
- Eric McCain – NJCAA Hall of Fame wide an American gridiron football player (born 1986)
- Willard Reaves – American football player (born 1959)
- Avery Weems - American baseball player (born 1997)
- Avery Anna - American singer-songwriter (born 2004)

== Other ==
Coconino High School is also home to the 1999 National Science Teacher of the Year, David Thompson, who taught physics at Coconino High School while being a master teacher at the Center for Science Teaching and Learning (CTSL) at Northern Arizona University.
