= Village of Oak Creek, Arizona =

Community in Yavapai County, Arizona

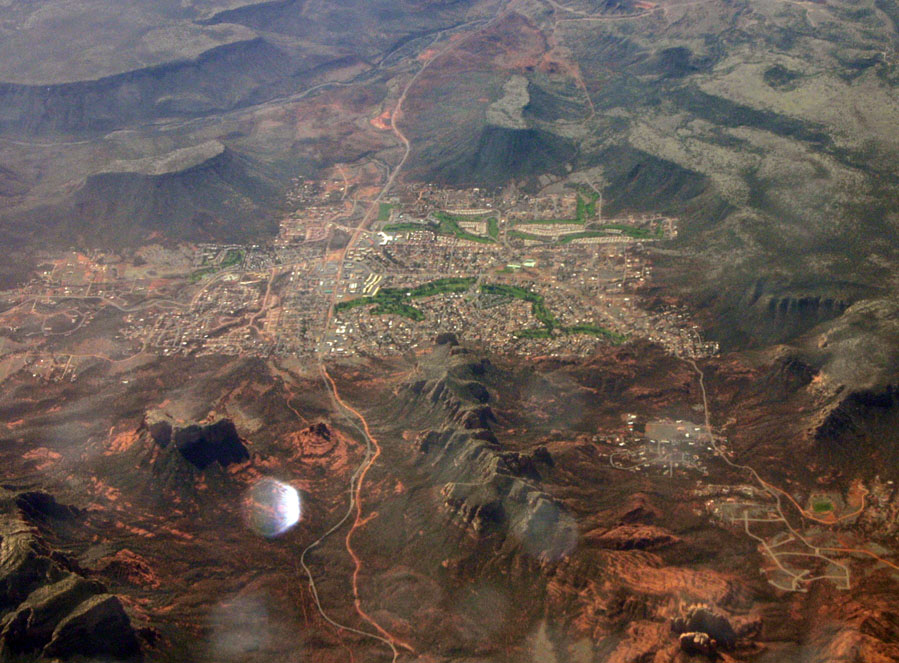
- Aerial view of the community
- Location of Village of Oak Creek (Big Park) in Yavapai County, Arizona.
- Location in the United States
- Coordinates: 34°47′02″N 111°44′54″W
- Country: United States
- State: Arizona
- Counties: Yavapai

Area
  - Total: 5.25 sq mi (13.61 km^{2})
  - Land: 5.25 sq mi (13.61 km^{2})
  - Water: 0 sq mi (0.00 km^{2})
- Elevation: 4,105 ft (1,251 m)

Population (2020)
  - Total: 6,128
  - Density: 1,166/sq mi (450.1/km^{2})
- Time zone: UTC-7 (MST)
- FIPS code: 04-80095
- GNIS feature ID: 2407842

Village of Oak Creek is an unincorporated community located within Big Park, a census-designated place (CDP) in Yavapai County, Arizona, United States. The population was 6,147 at the 2010 census, up from 5,245 in 2000. Big Park is the name of the CDP while the community is more commonly known as the Village of Oak Creek (VOC), and is a bedroom community for Sedona, located seven miles away. Tourism and service to retirees and second-home owners are the basis for the local economy. Big Park, the pioneers' name for the large open area that became the Village of Oak Creek in the early 1960s, is set among scenic red-rock buttes and canyons. The Bell Rock scenic area adjoins the north end of VOC, and the town is surrounded by the Coconino National Forest. A Forest Service Visitor Center is located at the south end of VOC.

== Geography ==
According to the United States Census Bureau, the CDP has a total area of 4.6 square miles (12 km^{2}), all land. As of 2016, Big Park / Village of Oak Creek is a designated Dark Sky Community.

=== Climate ===
Big Park, Arizona (ZIP 86351), has a semi-arid climate (Köppen BSk) characterized by hot summers, mild winters, low humidity, and distinct wet and dry seasons. Its climate is shaped by its 4,000 ft (1,220 m) elevation, proximity to the Mogollon Rim, and surrounding red rock formations. Summers are hot but less extreme than Phoenix, with highs averaging in the mid-90s°F (35 °C), while winter days are mild, often in the 50s°F (10–15 °C), with nights occasionally dropping below freezing. The area receives an average of 22 inches (560 mm) of annual precipitation, mostly from the North American Monsoon (July–September) and winter Pacific storms (December–March). Monsoons bring intense thunderstorms, flash floods, and occasional hail, while winter storms can deliver rain and light snowfall, though accumulation is rare. The Mogollon Rim to the north helps funnel monsoonal moisture into the region but also blocks Arctic cold fronts in winter, keeping temperatures milder than higher elevations like Flagstaff. The red rock formations absorb heat during the day and radiate it at night, moderating temperature swings, while spring brings strong winds due to changing pressure systems. The area gets over 275 sunny days per year, with occasional fog in winter and spring mornings. Winds are generally light but can gust over 50 mph (80 km/h) during storms. Snowfall is rare, averaging 4–6 inches (10–15 cm) per year, with most melting within a day.

=== Climate Data ===
Climate data for Big Park, Arizona (86351)
Month	Jan	Feb	Mar	Apr	May	Jun	Jul	Aug	Sep	Oct	Nov	Dec	Year
Average rainfall inches (mm)	1.60 (41)	1.47 (37)	1.69 (43)	1.14 (29)	0.55 (14)	0.36 (9.1)	1.91 (49)	2.10 (53)	1.52 (39)	1.36 (35)	1.20 (30)	1.53 (39)	16.43 (418.1)
Average snowfall inches (cm)	1.5 (3.8)	1.0 (2.5)	0.5 (1.3)	0.2 (0.51)	0.0 (0.0)	0.0 (0.0)	0.0 (0.0)	0.0 (0.0)	0.0 (0.0)	0.1 (0.25)	0.6 (1.5)	1.2 (3.0)	5.1 (12.86)
Average relative humidity (%)	55	50	45	35	25	20	35	40	35	40	50	55	40
Mean monthly sunshine hours	25	26	28	29	30	30	29	28	28	28	27	25	333

== Demographics ==
Historical population
Census	Pop.	Note	%±
1910	141		—
1990	3,024		—
2000	5,245		73.4%
2010	6,147		17.2%
2020	6,128		−0.3%
U.S. Decennial Census

Village of Oak Creek first appeared as the Oak Creek Precinct in 1910. It did not reappear on the census again until 1990, when it was called Big Park and was made a census-designated place (CDP). In 2010, the name was changed to the present Village of Oak Creek (although alternatively called Big Park on census documents).

As of the census of 2000, there were 5,245 people, 2,560 households, and 1,602 families residing in the CDP. The population density was 1,154.1 inhabitants per square mile (445.6/km^{2}). There were 3,117 housing units at an average density of 685.9 per square mile (264.8/km^{2}). The racial makeup of the CDP was 95.6% White, 0.4% Black or African American, 0.4% Native American, 0.6% Asian, <0.1% Pacific Islander, 1.5% from other races, and 1.6% from two or more races. 6.8% of the population were Hispanic or Latino of any race.

There were 2,560 households, out of which 14.2% had children under the age of 18 living with them, 55.3% were married couples living together, 5.4% had a female householder with no husband present, and 37.4% were non-families. 30.9% of all households were made up of individuals, and 17.1% had someone living alone who was 65 years of age or older. The average household size was 2.01 and the average family size was 2.44.

In the CDP, the population was spread out, with 12.7% under the age of 18, 3.1% from 18 to 24, 17.7% from 25 to 44, 33.0% from 45 to 64, and 33.4% who were 65 years of age or older. The median age was 56 years. For every 100 females, there were 83.3 males. For every 100 females age 18 and over, there were 81.5 males.

The median income for a household in the CDP was $38,477, and the median income for a family was $46,268. Males had a median income of $38,007 versus $24,826 for females. The per capita income for the CDP was $30,026. About 5.8% of families and 8.4% of the population were below the poverty line, including 21.7% of those under age 18 and 2.6% of those age 65 or over.

== Arts ==
The Verde Valley Music Festival was held on the first weekend of each October at the Verde Valley School, just west of VOC. The Festival was a fundraiser for Native American scholarships at VVS, and long benefited from the sponsorship and generosity of Jackson Browne, whose son attended the school. Normally a mostly-acoustical show, past headliners include Browne (who almost always performs), Neil Young, and Bruce Cockburn.

== Education ==
The Village of Oak Creek is within the Sedona-Oak Creek Unified School District, which operates West Sedona School (K-6) and Sedona Red Rock Junior Senior High School.

The community previously hosted the Big Park Community School, "Home of the Coyotes", which opened in 1994. The school district voted in May 2020 to close the school due to budget deficit concerns. According to Randy Hawley, a member of the board of trustees, the district was having trouble having enough money to operate Big Park Community School, and the number of students had declined.

Verde Valley School, an International Baccalaureate boarding/college preparatory high school with many international and Native American students, is located between the Oak Creek and Red Rock Crossing. VVS was founded in 1948 by Hamilton and Barbara Warren. Scholars who helped found the school and guide its early years included Harvard anthropologist Clyde Kluckhohn, anthropologist Margaret Mead, and John Collier, Commissioner of Indian Affairs during the Franklin Roosevelt administration.

== Notable people ==
English portrait and abstract artist Kevin Geary moved to the Village of Oak Creek in 2008.

== See also ==
- List of census-designated places in Arizona
