= Winslow West, Arizona =

CDP in Coconino County, Arizona

- CDP
- Location in Navajo County and the state of Arizona

- Location in the United States
- Coordinates: 35°00′53″N 110°42′49″W
- Country: United States
- State: Arizona
- Counties: Navajo, Coconino

Area
  - Total: 17.20 sq mi (44.55 km^{2})
  - Land: 17.20 sq mi (44.54 km^{2})
  - Water: 0.0039 sq mi (0.01 km^{2})
- Elevation: 4,967 ft (1,514 m)

Population (2020)
  - Total: 457
  - Density: 26.6/sq mi (10.26/km^{2})
- Time zone: UTC-7 (MST)
- FIPS code: 04-83960
- GNIS feature ID: 2409612

Winslow West is a census-designated place (CDP) in Navajo and Coconino counties in Arizona, United States. The population was 438 at the 2010 census. The entire community is off-reservation trust land belonging to the Hopi Tribe of Arizona. It lies just west of the city of Winslow, and is more than 50 km (31 mi) south of the main Hopi Reservation.

== Geography ==
According to the United States Census Bureau, the CDP has a total area of 17.9 square miles (46.3 km^{2}), of which 0.004 square miles (0.01 km^{2}), or 0.02%, is water.

== Demographics ==
Historical population
Census	Pop.	Note	%±
2000	131		—
2010	438		234.4%
2020	457		4.3%
U.S. Decennial Census

As of the census of 2000, there were 131 people, 30 households, and 30 families living in the CDP. The population density was 418.8 inhabitants per square mile (161.7/km^{2}). There were 32 housing units at an average density of 102.3 per square mile (39.5/km^{2}). The racial makeup of the CDP was 98.5% Native American. 1.5% of the population were Hispanic or Latino of any race.

There were 30 households, out of which 86.7% had children under the age of 18 living with them, 26.7% were married couples living together, 63.3% had a female householder with no husband present, and 0.0% were non-families. No households were made up of individuals, and none had someone living alone who was 65 years of age or older. The average household size was 4.37 and the average family size was 3.93.

In the CDP, the age distribution of the population shows 56.5% under the age of 18, 6.9% from 18 to 24, 31.3% from 25 to 44, 4.6% from 45 to 64, and 0.8% who were 65 years of age or older. The median age was 16 years. For every 100 females, there were 95.5 males. For every 100 females age 18 and over, there were 78.1 males.

The median income for a household in the CDP was $8,250, and the median income for a family was $8,250. Males had a median income of $0 versus $26,250 for females. The per capita income for the CDP was $3,951. There were 88.9% of families and 68.4% of the population living below the poverty line, including 56.2% of those under 18 and none of those over 64.

== 2020 census ==
At the 2020 United States census, the population of Winslow West was 457 residents, reflecting a 4.3% increase from the 438 individuals recorded in 2010. The community's median age was 31 years old.

=== Housing and economics ===
The total number of housing units in the CDP grew to 174, a significant change from the 32 units recorded in 2000. The homeownership rate stood at 49.1%, with a median gross rent of $543 per month.

The median household income for the community was $29,000, which is significantly lower than the broader state and national averages. The poverty rate for Winslow West was measured at 31.0%, indicating that roughly one-third of the community lives below the federal poverty threshold.

== Education ==
The Navajo County portion is in the Winslow Unified School District, which operates Winslow High School.

The Coconino County portion is within the Flagstaff Unified School District. The zoned secondary schools are Sinagua Middle School and Coconino High School.

== See also ==
- List of census-designated places in Arizona
