= Flagstaff Arts and Leadership Academy =

Defunct public charter school in Flagstaff, Arizona

Coordinates: 35.237778°N 111.669167°W

Location
- 3401 N. Fort Valley Road; Flagstaff, Arizona 86001; United States

Information
- School type: Public charter high school
- Established: 1996 (30 years ago)
- CEEB code: 030112
- Director: Jaimie Gargas
- Grades: 6–12
- Enrollment: 127 students (2025-2026)
- Colors: Pink, Turquoise, Orange, White
- Mascot: Llama
- Website: flagarts.com

Flagstaff Arts and Leadership Academy (FALA) was a public charter high school and middle school in Flagstaff, Arizona. The curricular emphases were college preparatory and performing and visual arts. It was located by the Museum of Northern Arizona, with which it worked closely.

== History ==
FALA was established as a charter high school in 1996 by Karen Butterfield, Arizona's 1993 Teacher of the year. In 2010, FALA built a new campus and added grades 7 and 8. The school added sixth grade in 2017.

On April 24, 2026, the school's governing board voted to close at the end of the 2025-2026 school year due to declining enrollment and financial issues. The school ceased operations on June 30, 2026.

== Curriculum ==
The Flagstaff Arts and Leadership Academy partnered with the Museum of Northern Arizona. In 2007 The Manual of Museum Learning said, "Located on the museum's campus, this public charter high school was heralded by the U.S. Department of Education for its academic rigor, unique learning environment, and academic/arts partnership with its museum partner."
