= Kaibab Estates West, Arizona =

CDP in Coconino County, Arizona

Kaibab Estates West
- Census-designated place
- Location within Arizona Location within the United States
- Coordinates: 35°16′34″N 112°30′07″W
- Country: United States
- State: Arizona
- County: Coconino

Area
  - Total: 22.61 sq mi (58.56 km^{2})
  - Land: 22.61 sq mi (58.56 km^{2})
  - Water: 0 sq mi (0.00 km^{2})
- Elevation: 5,322 ft (1,622 m)

Population (2020)
  - Total: 1,034
  - Density: 45.7/sq mi (17.66/km^{2})
- Time zone: UTC-7 (MST)
  - Summer (DST): UTC-6 (MDT)
- ZIP Code: 86320 (Ash Fork)
- FIPS code: 04-36535
- GNIS feature ID: 2805216

Kaibab Estates West is an unincorporated community and census-designated place (CDP) in Coconino County, Arizona, United States. It is bordered to the south by Yavapai County. It was first listed as a CDP prior to the 2020 census.

It is in the Ash Fork Joint Unified School District.

== Demographics ==
Historical population
| Census | Pop. | Note | %± |
|---|---|---|---|
| 2020 | 1,034 | | — |
U.S. Decennial Census

=== 2020 census ===
As of the 2020 census, Kaibab Estates West had a population of 1,034. The median age was 53.9 years. 19.1% of residents were under the age of 18 and 28.9% of residents were 65 years of age or older. For every 100 females there were 111.9 males, and for every 100 females age 18 and over there were 111.6 males age 18 and over.

0.0% of residents lived in urban areas, while 100.0% lived in rural areas.

There were 426 households in Kaibab Estates West, of which 18.8% had children under the age of 18 living in them. Of all households, 48.8% were married-couple households, 27.9% were households with a male householder and no spouse or partner present, and 17.1% were households with a female householder and no spouse or partner present. About 32.1% of all households were made up of individuals and 14.8% had someone living alone who was 65 years of age or older.

There were 611 housing units, of which 30.3% were vacant. The homeowner vacancy rate was 5.1% and the rental vacancy rate was 1.7%.

Racial composition as of the 2020 census
| Race | Number | Percent |
|---|---|---|
| White | 823 | 79.6% |
| Black or African American | 6 | 0.6% |
| American Indian and Alaska Native | 14 | 1.4% |
| Asian | 4 | 0.4% |
| Native Hawaiian and Other Pacific Islander | 0 | 0.0% |
| Some other race | 99 | 9.6% |
| Two or more races | 88 | 8.5% |
| Hispanic or Latino (of any race) | 228 | 22.1% |
