= Kevin Geary =

British artist

- Born: 1952 (age 73–74); Lincoln, England
- Known for: Portrait painting, Abstract painting and Poetry
- Spouse: Patricia
- Mother: Gloria Pashley

Kevin Geary (born 1952) is an English portrait and abstract artist and poet. Some of his works are in the collections of the National Portrait Gallery, London, the Fine Arts Museums of San Francisco, the Abbey Theatre, Dublin, Wigmore Hall and Arundells.

== Biography ==
=== Early life ===
Geary was born in 1952 in Lincoln, England. His mother was the violinist Gloria Pashley.

Three generations of Geary's family, including his Irish grandfather and great-grandfather, were marine artists.

In 1966, at the age 14, Geary won an award from the Royal Drawing Society of Great Britain.

=== Career ===
Although good at art and playing the piano, Geary's ambition as a child was to be a political cartoonist. Geary contacted Leslie Gilbert Illingworth a political cartoonist for the Daily Mail and Punch. Illingworth encouraged with the words "It's difficult, but genius will out." His first job, in 1971, at the age of 19, was as political cartoonist for the Financial Times. He became acquainted with Prime Minister Edward Heath after calling on his offices in the House of Commons and presenting the staff with one of his drawings of Heath which Heath later bought. That cartoon is in the Arundells collection. Geary's work for the Financial Times came to an end due to artistic differences.

After working for the Financial Times Geary worked for an advertising agency.

Geary's first one-man show was opened in 1972 by the next prime minister, Harold Wilson who lent his portrait to the show. Wilson personally presented a Geary portrait of Golda Meir to her on a visit to Israel soon after the one-man show.

In 1973 Geary had painting lessons with Carel Weight and also studied colour theory and anatomy.

Geary's poetry writing started in the 1970s after he was encouraged by Stephen Spender who read one of his poems in London.

In 1975 drawings by Geary of the Stations of the Cross were installed in the Catholic Church of Christ the Eternal High Priest, Gidea Park. The drawings now hang in the Merici Hall of St John Payne Catholic School in Chelmsford, Essex.

In the mid 1970s Geary was in Ireland living in Waterford and Dublin where he held one of his early one man shows at the Setanta Gallery.

On 1 February 1982 a portrait by Geary of the pianist Ivor Newton was unveiled by Edward Heath at the Wigmore Hall.

Geary lived in Paris in 1983/1984.

In 1986 Geary moved to the United States of America, first living in Seattle, Washington, then Los Angeles, California (1987-1989), San Francisco, California (1989-1998), Hudson, New York (1998/1999) and Scottsdale, Arizona (1999).

In 2003 Geary exhibited at the Cathedral Center for the Arts in Phoenix, Arizona.

Geary moved to Sedona, Arizona in 2000, and moved to the nearby Village of Oak Creek, Arizona, in 2008. Some of his abstract work was exhibited in Jerome, Arizona, in September of that year.

Geary read from his book Paris and Other Poems at the Sedona Arts Center on 6 August 2010.

=== Portraits ===
Geary's portraits include those of Vladimir Ashkenazy, Count Basie, Leonard Bernstein, Jack Brymer, Cyril Cusack, Plácido Domingo, Duke Ellington, Ella Fitzgerald, Dizzy Gillespie, Lord Goodman, Henry Kissinger, Senator John McCain, Golda Meir, Princess Michael of Kent, Ivor Newton, Seán O'Casey, Pope John Paul II, John Williams, and Harold Wilson.

Geary's portraits are made using graphite on Fabriano paper.

Geary's portrait of London Symphony clarinettist Jack Brymer is in the primary collection of the National Portrait Gallery, London.

=== Membership ===
Geary is a member of the Contemporary Portrait Society.

== Bibliography ==
Geary, Kevin (2009). Paris And Other Poems. Geary Art Publishing. p. 116. ISBN 9780615329086.
