= Mountain View Ranches, Arizona =

CDP in Coconino County, Arizona

- Census-designated place
- Location within Arizona Location within the United States
- Coordinates: 35°14′11″N 111°28′19″W
- Country: United States
- State: Arizona
- County: Coconino

Area
  - Total: 4.92 sq mi (12.74 km^{2})
  - Land: 4.92 sq mi (12.74 km^{2})
  - Water: 0 sq mi (0.00 km^{2})
- Elevation: 6,368 ft (1,941 m)

Population (2020)
  - Total: 1,508
  - Density: 306.7/sq mi (118.41/km^{2})
- Time zone: UTC-7 (MST)
  - Summer (DST): UTC-6 (MDT)
- ZIP Code: 86004 (Flagstaff)
- FIPS code: 04-47925
- GNIS feature ID: 2805221

Mountain View Ranches is an unincorporated community and census-designated place (CDP) in Coconino County, Arizona, United States. It lies to the northeast of Flagstaff and was first listed as a CDP prior to the 2020 census.

== Demographics ==
Historical population
Census	Pop.	Note	%±
2020	1,508		—
U.S. Decennial Census

=== 2020 census ===
As of the 2020 census, Mountain View Ranches had a population of 1,508. The median age was 45.7 years. 19.6% of residents were under the age of 18 and 20.2% of residents were 65 years of age or older. For every 100 females there were 105.4 males, and for every 100 females age 18 and over there were 103.5 males age 18 and over.

0.0% of residents lived in urban areas, while 100.0% lived in rural areas.

There were 561 households in Mountain View Ranches, of which 24.6% had children under the age of 18 living in them. Of all households, 60.2% were married-couple households, 16.6% were households with a male householder and no spouse or partner present, and 15.5% were households with a female householder and no spouse or partner present. About 19.0% of all households were made up of individuals and 8.2% had someone living alone who was 65 years of age or older.

There were 577 housing units, of which 2.8% were vacant. The homeowner vacancy rate was 0.4% and the rental vacancy rate was 4.4%.

Racial composition as of the 2020 census
Race	Number	Percent
White	1,141	75.7%
Black or African American	3	0.2%
American Indian and Alaska Native	146	9.7%
Asian	12	0.8%
Native Hawaiian and Other Pacific Islander	0	0.0%
Some other race	67	4.4%
Two or more races	139	9.2%
Hispanic or Latino (of any race)	210	13.9%

== Education ==
Mountain View Ranches is within the Flagstaff Unified School District.

The zoned secondary schools are Sinagua Middle School and Coconino High School.
