= Ash Fork High School =

Coordinates: 35.2214°N 112.4863°W

Location
- 46999 N. 5th Street; Ash Fork, Arizona 86320; United States

Information
- School type: Public high school
- School district: Ash Fork Joint Unified School District
- CEEB code: 030005
- Principal: Seth Staples
- Teaching staff: 5.66 (FTE)
- Grades: 9-12
- Enrollment: 103 (2024–2025)
- Student to teacher ratio: 18.20
- Colors: Royal blue and gold
- Mascot: Spartans
- Website: www.afjusd.org

Ash Fork High School is a high school in Ash Fork, Arizona, USA. It is the only high school under the jurisdiction of the Ash Fork Joint Unified School District, which also includes an elementary school and middle school.

Notable alumni and faculty:

Lee Patton, legendary Hall of Fame coach at West Virginia University, former coach at Ash Fork High School.
