= Rare Metals, Arizona =

Unincorporated community in the state of Arizona, United States

- Populated place
- Location within the state of Arizona Rare Metals (the United States)
- Coordinates: 36°08′58″N 111°08′11″W
- Country: United States
- State: Arizona
- County: Coconino
- Elevation: 5,174 ft (1,577 m)
- Time zone: UTC-7 (Mountain (MST))
  - Summer (DST): UTC-7 (MST)
- Area code: 928
- FIPS code: 04-58990
- GNIS feature ID: 9960

Rare Metals is a populated place in Coconino County, Arizona, United States.
