= Coconino County, Arizona =

County in Arizona, United States

- County
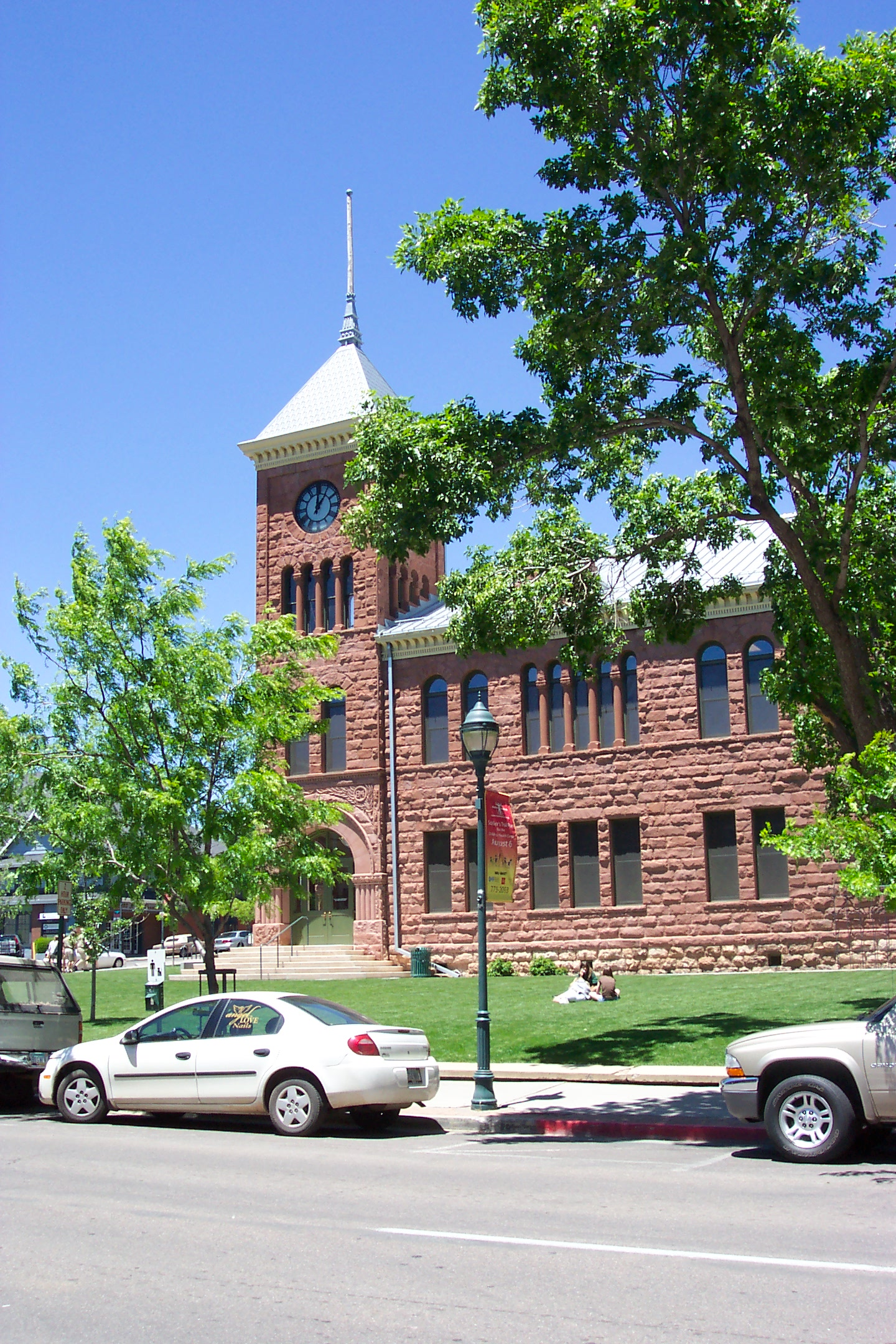
- Old Coconino County Courthouse in Flagstaff

- Flag Logo

- Location within the U.S. state of Arizona
- Coordinates: 35°42′N 111°30′W
- Country: United States
- State: Arizona
- Founded: February 18, 1891
- Named for: Hopi designation for the Havasupai, Hualapai, and/or Yavapai tribes
- Seat: Flagstaff
- Largest city: Flagstaff

Area
  - Total: 18,661 sq mi (48,330 km^{2})
  - Land: 18,619 sq mi (48,220 km^{2})
  - Water: 43 sq mi (110 km^{2}) 0.2%

Population (2020)
  - Total: 145,101
  - Estimate (2025): 144,368 ▼
  - Density: 7.7932/sq mi (3.0090/km^{2})
- Time zone: UTC−7 (Mountain)
- Congressional district: 2nd
- Website: www.coconino.az.gov

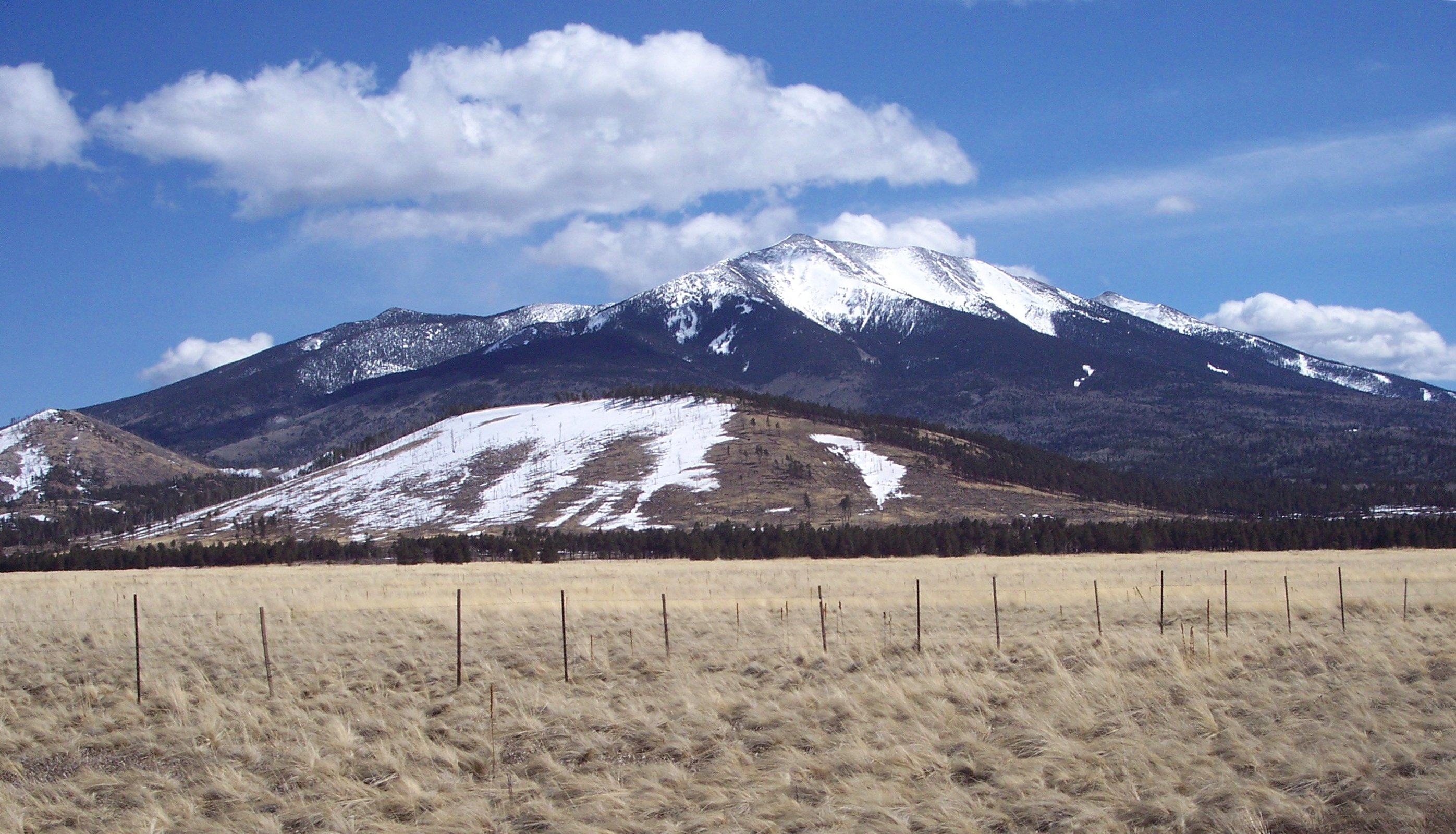
Humphreys Peak, the highest point in Arizona

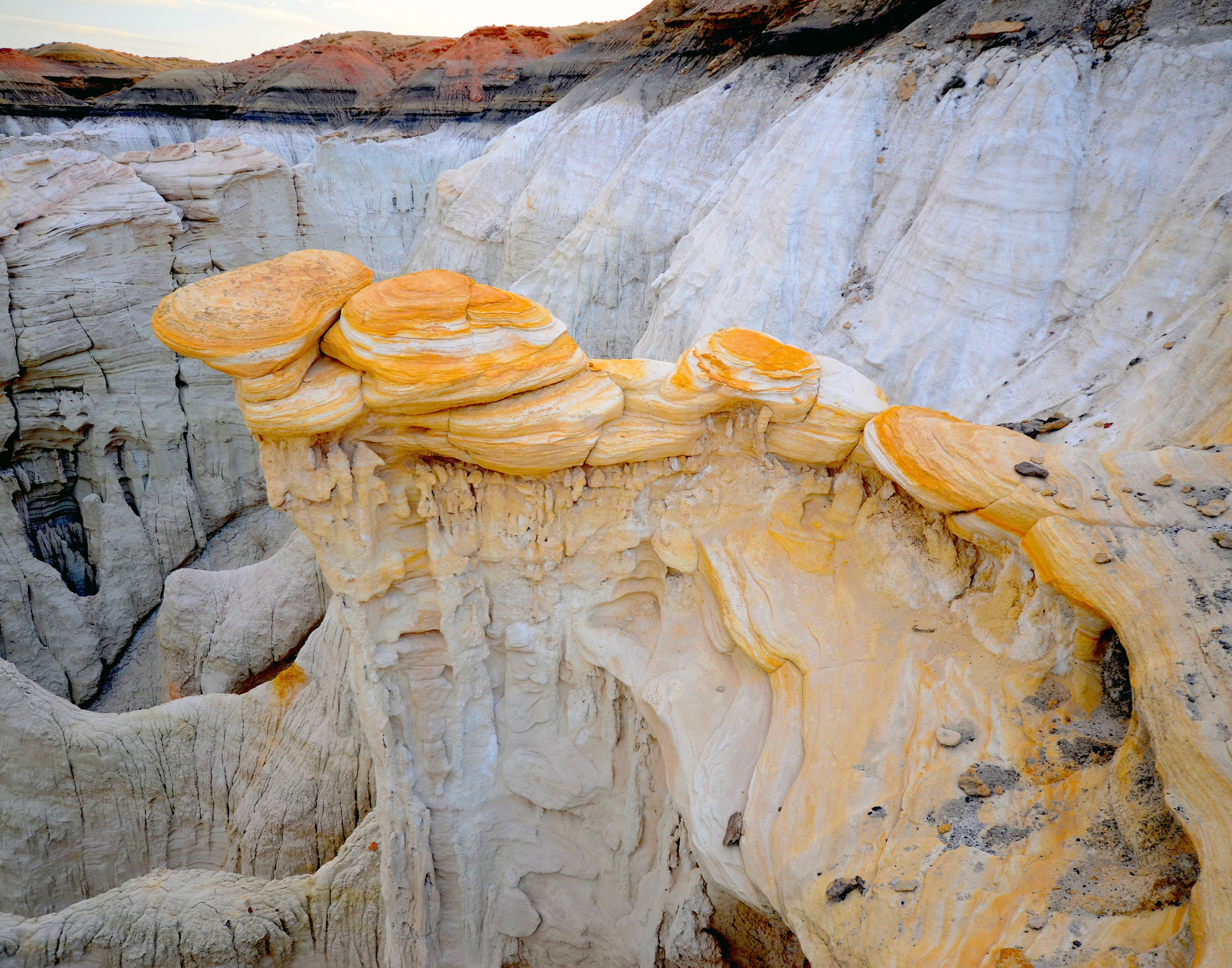
Hahonogeh Canyon, Navajo Nation

Coconino County is a county in the North-Central part of the U.S. state of Arizona. Its population was 145,101 at the 2020 census. The county seat is Flagstaff. The county takes its name from Cohonino, a name applied to the Havasupai people. It is the second-largest county by area in the contiguous United States, behind San Bernardino County, California. It has 18,661 sq mi (48,332 km^{2}), or 16.4% of Arizona's total area, and is larger than nine U.S. states.

Coconino County comprises the Flagstaff metropolitan statistical area, Grand Canyon National Park, the federally recognized Havasupai Nation, and parts of the federally recognized Navajo, Hualapai, and Hopi nations. As a result, its relatively large Native American population makes up nearly 30% of the county's total population; it is mostly Navajo, with smaller numbers of other tribes.

== History ==
After European Americans completed the Atlantic & Pacific Railroad in 1883, the region of northern Yavapai County began to undergo rapid growth. The people of the northern reaches had tired of the rigors of traveling to Prescott to conduct county business. They believed that they should have their own county jurisdiction, so petitioned in 1887 for secession from Yavapai and creation of a new Frisco County. This did not take place, but Coconino County was formed in 1891 and its seat was designated as Flagstaff.

== Geography ==
According to the United States Census Bureau, the county has a total area of 18,661 square miles (48,330 km^{2}), of which 18,619 square miles (48,220 km^{2}) are land and 43 square miles (110 km^{2}) (0.2%) are covered by water. It is the largest county by area in Arizona and the second-largest county in the United States (excluding boroughs in Alaska) after San Bernardino County in California. It has more land area than each of the following states: Connecticut, Delaware, Hawaii, Maryland, Massachusetts, New Hampshire, New Jersey, Rhode Island, and Vermont.

The highest natural point in the county, as well as the entire state, is Humphreys Peak at 12,637 ft or 3,852 m. The Barringer Meteor Crater is located in Coconino County.

=== Adjacent counties ===
- Mohave County – west
- Yavapai County – south
- Gila County – south
- Navajo County – east
- San Juan County, Utah – northeast
- Kane County, Utah – north

=== Indian reservations ===
Coconino County has 7,142 sq mi (18,497.7 km^{2}) of federally designated Indian reservations, second in scale only to Apache County. In descending order of area within the county, the reservations are the Navajo, Hualapai, Hopi, Havasupai, and Kaibab. The Havasupai Reservation is the only one that lies entirely within the county's borders.

=== National protected areas ===
- Apache-Sitgreaves National Forest (part)
- Coconino National Forest (part)
- Glen Canyon National Recreation Area (part)
- Grand Canyon National Park (part)
- Kaibab National Forest (part)
- Prescott National Forest (part)
- Sunset Crater Volcano National Monument
- Vermilion Cliffs National Monument
- Walnut Canyon National Monument
- Wupatki National Monument

== Demographics ==
Historical population
Census	Pop.	Note	%±
1900	5,514		—
1910	8,130		47.4%
1920	9,982		22.8%
1930	14,064		40.9%
1940	18,770		33.5%
1950	23,910		27.4%
1960	41,857		75.1%
1970	48,326		15.5%
1980	75,008		55.2%
1990	96,591		28.8%
2000	116,320		20.4%
2010	134,421		15.6%
2020	145,101		7.9%
2025 (est.)	144,368	▼	−0.5%
U.S. Decennial Census; 1790–1960 1900–1990; 1990–2000 2010–2020

=== Racial and ethnic composition ===
Coconino County, Arizona – Racial and ethnic composition Note: the US Census treats Hispanic/Latino as an ethnic category. This table excludes Latinos from the racial categories and assigns them to a separate category. Hispanics/Latinos may be of any race.
Race / Ethnicity (NH = Non-Hispanic)	2020	2010	2000	1990	1980
White alone (NH)	53% (76,904)	55.2% (74,231)	57.6% (66,969)	58.9% (56,938)	60% (45,037)
Black alone (NH)	1.2% (1,777)	1.1% (1,495)	1% (1,150)	1.4% (1,339)	1.8% (1,319)
American Indian alone (NH)	24.2% (35,143)	26.5% (35,610)	28% (32,557)	28.7% (27,737)	27.7% (20,814)
Asian alone (NH)	1.8% (2,582)	1.3% (1,787)	0.8% (896)	0.8% (821)	0.6% (443)
Pacific Islander alone (NH)	0.2% (254)	0.1% (138)	0.1% (100)		
Other race alone (NH)	0.4% (616)	0.1% (192)	0.1% (128)	0.1% (60)	0.1% (109)
Multiracial (NH)	4.2% (6,106)	2.1% (2,802)	1.5% (1,793)	—	—
Hispanic/Latino (any race)	15% (21,719)	13.5% (18,166)	10.9% (12,727)	10% (9,696)	9.7% (7,286)

=== American Community Survey 2025 data ===
The United States Census Bureau estimated that in 2025, Coconino County’s population was 144.368. It was also estimated that the county's population was 51,91% Non-Hispanic White, 16,67% Hispanic or Latino, 1,24% Non-Hispanic Black, 2,12% Asian, 24,34% Native American, 0,19% Pacific Islander, and 3,53% Multiracial.

Total	Population	Percentage
Non-Hispanic White	74.942	51,91%
Hispanic or Latino	24.069	16,67%
Non-Hispanic Black	1.786	1,24%
Asian	3.061	2,12%
Native American	35.140	24,34%
Pacific Islander	280	0,19%
Non-Hispanic Multiracial	5.090	3,53%

=== 2020 census ===
As of the 2020 census, the county had a population of 145,101. Of the residents, 20.1% were under the age of 18 and 13.8% were 65 years of age or older; the median age was 32.5 years. For every 100 females there were 96.3 males, and for every 100 females age 18 and over there were 94.2 males. 67.6% of residents lived in urban areas and 32.4% lived in rural areas.

The racial makeup of the county was 57.4% White, 1.4% Black or African American, 25.0% American Indian and Alaska Native, 1.8% Asian, 0.2% Native Hawaiian and Pacific Islander, 5.3% from some other race, and 8.9% from two or more races. Hispanic or Latino residents of any race comprised 15.0% of the population.

There were 51,320 households in the county, of which 28.9% had children under the age of 18 living with them and 27.4% had a female householder with no spouse or partner present. About 26.4% of all households were made up of individuals and 8.8% had someone living alone who was 65 years of age or older.

There were 69,108 housing units, of which 25.7% were vacant. Among occupied housing units, 59.2% were owner-occupied and 40.8% were renter-occupied. The homeowner vacancy rate was 1.4% and the rental vacancy rate was 8.7%.

=== 2010 census ===
As of the census of 2010, 134,421 people, 46,711 households, and 29,656 families were living in the county. The population density was 7.2 inhabitants per square mile (2.8 inhabitants/km^{2}). The 63,321 housing units had an average density of 3.4 units per square mile (1.3 units/km^{2}). The racial makeup of the county was 61.7% White (55.2% non-Hispanic White), 27.3% American Indian, 1.4% Asian, 1.2% African American, 0.1% Pacific Islander, 5.2% from other races, and 3.1% from two or more races. Those of Hispanic or Latino origin made up 13.5% of the population. The largest ancestry groups were:

- 23.2% Navajo
- 14.5% German
- 11.3% Mexican
- 9.9% English
- 9.6% Irish
- 3.6% Italian
- 2.7% American
- 2.2% Swedish
- 2.1% Scottish
- 2.0% French
- 1.9% Norwegian
- 1.9% Polish
- 1.8% Scotch-Irish
- 1.3% Dutch

Of the 46,711 households, 33.1% had children under the age of 18 living with them, 45.0% were married couples living together, 12.7% had a female householder with no husband present, 36.5% were not families, and 24.5% of all households were made up of individuals. The average household size was 2.69, and the average family size was 3.26. The median age was 31.0 years.

The median income for a household in the county was $49,510 and for a family was $58,841. Males had a median income of $42,331 versus $31,869 for females. The per capita income for the county was $22,632. About 11.6% of families and 18.6% of the population were below the poverty line, including 22.5% of those under age 18 and 13.8% of those age 65 or over.

=== 2000 census ===
As of the census of 2000, 116,320 people, 40,448 households, and 26,938 families were living in the county. The population density was 6 people per square mile (2.3 people/km^{2}). The 53,443 housing units averaged 3 units per square mile (1.2 units/km^{2}). The racial makeup of the county was 63.1% White, 28.5% Native American, 1.0% African American, 0.8% Asian, 4.2% from other races, and 2.4% from two or more races. About 10.9% of the population were Hispanics or Latinos of any race. Around 18.6% reported speaking Navajo at home, while 6.6% spoke Spanish.

Of the 40,448 households, 34.9% had children under the age of 18 living with them, 49.7% were married couples living together, 12.2% had a female householder with no husband present, and 33.4% were not families. About 22.1% of all households were made up of individuals, and 4.5% had someone living alone who was 65 years of age or older. The average household size was 2.80, and the average family size was 3.36.

In the county, the age distribution was 28.7% under 18, 14.4% from 18 to 24, 29.2% from 25 to 44, 20.7% from 45 to 64, and 7.0% who were 65 or older. The median age was 30 years. For every 100 females, there were 99.70 males. For every 100 females age 18 and over, there were 97.20 males.

The median income for a household in the county was $38,256, and for a family was $45,873. Males had a median income of $32,226 versus $25,055 for females. The per capita income for the county was $17,139. About 13.1% of families and 18.2% of the population were below the poverty line, including 22.3% of those under age 18 and 13.3% of those age 65 or over.

== Communities ==
Map showing the borders for incorporated and unincorporated areas in Coconino County. Also shown are borders for Indian reservations.

=== Cities ===
- Flagstaff (county seat)
- Page
- Sedona (mostly in Yavapai County)
- Williams

=== Towns ===
- Fredonia
- Tusayan

=== Census-designated places ===
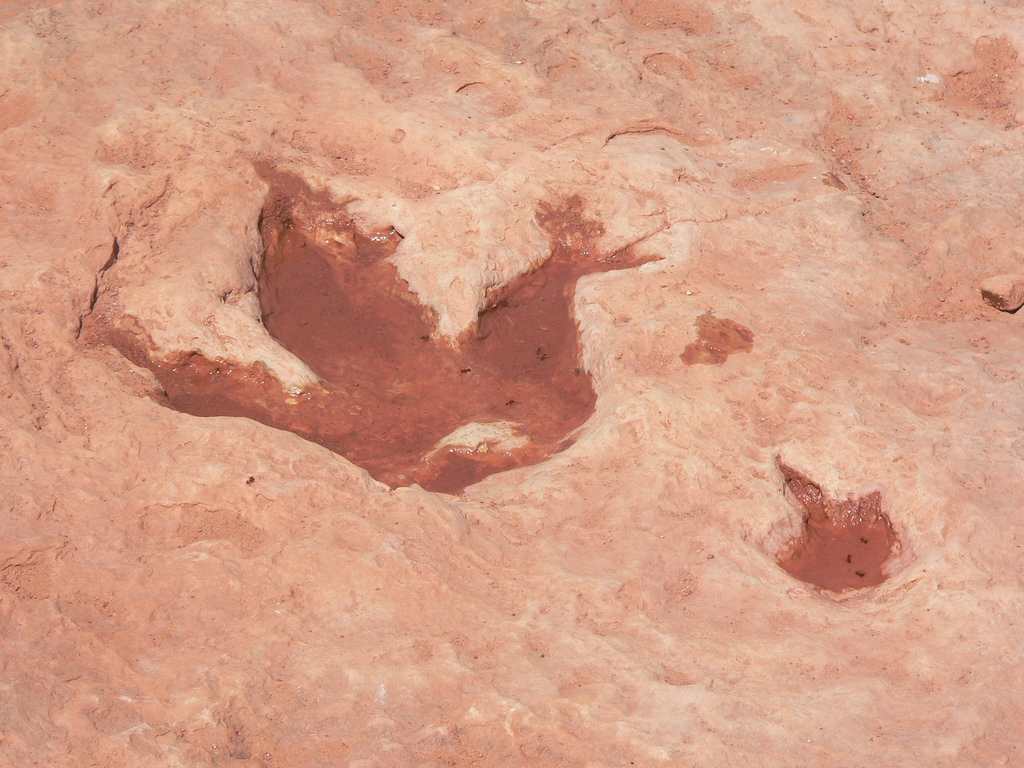
Dinosaur track near Tuba City

- Bellemont
- Bitter Springs
- Blue Ridge
- Cameron
- Doney Park
- Forest Lakes
- Fort Valley
- Grand Canyon Village
- Greenehaven
- Kachina Village
- Kaibab Estates West
- Kaibito
- LeChee
- Leupp
- Moenkopi
- Mormon Lake
- Mountain View Ranches
- Mountainaire
- Munds Park
- Oak Creek Canyon
- Parks
- Red Lake
- Supai
- Timberline-Fernwood
- Tolani Lake
- Tonalea
- Tuba City
- Valle
- Winslow West (mostly in Navajo County)

=== Other communities ===
- Big Springs
- Gray Mountain
- Happy Jack
- Jacob Lake
- Marble Canyon
- North Rim
- Rare Metals
- Robbers Roost
- Ryan
- Winona

=== Ghost towns ===
- Canyon Diablo
- House Rock
- Two Guns

=== Indian reservations ===
- Havasupai Indian Reservation
- Hopi Reservation
- Hualapai Indian reservation
- Kaibab Indian Reservation
- Navajo Nation

=== County population ranking ===
The population ranking of the following table is based on the 2010 census of Coconino County. † county seat

Rank	City/town/etc.	Population (2010 Census)	Municipal type	Incorporated
1	† Flagstaff	65,870	City	1928
2	Sedona (mostly in Yavapai County)	10,031	City	1988
3	Tuba City	8,611	CDP	
4	Page	7,247	City	1975
5	Doney Park	5,395	CDP	
6	Williams	3,023	City	1901
7	Kachina Village	2,622	CDP	
8	Grand Canyon Village	2,004	CDP	
9	Kaibito	1,522	CDP	
10	LeChee	1,443	CDP	
11	Fredonia	1,314	Town	1956
12	Parks	1,188	CDP	
13	Mountainaire	1,119	CDP	
14	Moenkopi	964	CDP	
15	Leupp	951	CDP	
16	Cameron	885	CDP	
17	Valle	832	CDP	
18	Fort Valley	779	CDP	
19	Munds Park	631	CDP	
20	Tusayan	558	Town	2010
21	Tonalea	549	CDP	
22	Bitter Springs	452	CDP	
23	Winslow West (mostly in Navajo County)	438	CDP	
24	Tolani Lake	280	CDP	
25	Supai	208	CDP	
26	Kaibab (mostly in Mohave County)	124	CDP	

== Politics ==
Coconino County has trended towards the Democratic Party in modern times after being a Republican stronghold between the 1950s and 1980s. It was won by every Republican presidential nominee between 1952 and 1988; however, no Republican since George H. W. Bush in 1988 has managed to come within 6% of reclaiming the county. It is the only county from any state west of the Mississippi River – apart from Black Belt Madison Parish, which is directly adjacent to that river – that voted for Barry Goldwater in 1964 but has since voted for the Democratic nominee in the eight most recent presidential elections. The Flagstaff area is a Democratic stronghold, along with all the Indian Reservations (though some of these saw Republican trends in 2024), and the city of Sedona also leans Democratic. The Havasupai Reservation is the most Democratic area in the county, having voted close to 90% Democratic in the 2024 election. The cities of Williams and Page and surrounding areas, on the other hand, trend Republican.

United States presidential election results for Coconino County, Arizona
Year	Republican		Democratic		Third party(ies)	
Year	No.	%	No.	%	No.	%
1912	237	27.72%	339	39.65%	279	32.63%
1916	802	38.71%	1,171	56.52%	99	4.78%
1920	1,342	63.21%	781	36.79%	0	0.00%
1924	1,045	45.10%	711	30.69%	561	24.21%
1928	1,717	59.19%	1,172	40.40%	12	0.41%
1932	1,110	28.81%	2,689	69.79%	54	1.40%
1936	1,140	29.77%	2,578	67.33%	111	2.90%
1940	1,913	38.64%	3,025	61.10%	13	0.26%
1944	1,786	44.34%	2,236	55.51%	6	0.15%
1948	2,093	47.13%	2,309	51.99%	39	0.88%
1952	3,827	61.38%	2,408	38.62%	0	0.00%
1956	4,044	63.50%	2,314	36.33%	11	0.17%
1960	4,870	54.45%	4,065	45.45%	9	0.10%
1964	5,756	52.15%	5,270	47.75%	11	0.10%
1968	6,765	59.38%	3,504	30.76%	1,123	9.86%
1972	10,611	61.02%	6,250	35.94%	528	3.04%
1976	11,036	51.53%	9,450	44.12%	932	4.35%
1980	14,613	55.78%	7,832	29.89%	3,754	14.33%
1984	17,581	59.13%	11,528	38.77%	626	2.11%
1988	16,649	51.80%	14,660	45.61%	831	2.59%
1992	13,769	32.31%	18,888	44.32%	9,961	23.37%
1996	13,638	35.40%	20,475	53.15%	4,409	11.45%
2000	17,562	42.96%	20,280	49.60%	3,041	7.44%
2004	22,526	43.00%	29,243	55.82%	622	1.19%
2008	22,186	40.65%	31,433	57.59%	964	1.77%
2012	21,220	40.84%	29,257	56.30%	1,485	2.86%
2016	21,108	35.31%	32,404	54.20%	6,272	10.49%
2020	27,052	36.88%	44,698	60.94%	1,596	2.18%
2024	27,576	39.34%	41,504	59.21%	1,016	1.45%

== Economy ==
Grand Canyon Airlines and Air Grand Canyon are headquartered on the grounds of Grand Canyon National Park Airport in Tusayan.

In 2017, the largest employers in Coconino County were:

#	Employer	# of employees
1	Northern Arizona University	3,500
2	W. L. Gore & Associates	3,060
3	Flagstaff Medical Center	2,180
4	Flagstaff Unified School District	1,590
5	Aramark	1,310
6	Coconino County	1,080
7	City of Flagstaff	750
8	National Park Service	700
9	Page Unified School District 8	680
10	State of Arizona	670
11	Grand Canyon Railway	600
12	Haven of Flagstaff	510
13	Salt River Project	500
14	United States Forest Service	490
15	Walmart	470

According to the Bureau of Economic Analysis, in 2019 the employment of Coconino County in the following sectors was:

Sector	Number of jobs	Percent	National percent
Accommodation and food services	14,472	16.6%	7.5%
Health care and social assistance	9,901	11.4%	11.3%
Retail trade	8,201	9.4%	9.4%
State government	8,078	9.3%	2.7%
Local government	7,780	8.9%	7.1%
Manufacturing	4,202	4.8%	6.7%
Real estate and rental and leasing	4,072	4.7%	4.8%
Other services (except government)	3,883	4.5%	5.8%
Professional, scientific, and technical services	3,777	4.3%	7.2%
Construction	3,766	4.3%	5.5%
Arts, entertainment, and recreation	3,507	4.0%	2.4%
Federal civilian	2,687	3.1%	1.4%
Administrative and support and waste management and remediation services	2,592	3.0%	6.2%
Transportation and warehousing	2,162	2.5%	4.5%
Farming	2,110	2.4%	1.3%
Finance and insurance	1,813	2.1%	5.4%
Wholesale trade	1,235	1.4%	3.2%
Educational services	1,109	1.3%	2.4%
Information	715	0.8%	1.7%
Military	291	0.3%	1.0%
Forestry, fishing, and related activities	230	0.3%	0.5%
Management of companies and enterprises	216	0.2%	1.4%
Utilities	185	0.2%	0.3%
Mining, quarrying, and oil and gas extraction	175	0.2%	0.6%
Total	87,159	100.0%	100.0%

== Transportation ==
Flagstaff in Coconino County is a major highway junction, with Interstate 40 extending to the east and the west (connecting with Williams and Winslow, Arizona, for example), and with Interstate 17 extending south from Flagstaff to Phoenix and Maricopa County. U.S. Routes 89 and 180 extend north from Flagstaff and connect it with the Grand Canyon National Park.

The Grand Canyon National Park Airport is a public airport located in Tusayan, near the South Rim of the Grand Canyon.

Flagstaff Pulliam Airport is a public airport located four miles (6.4 km) south of the central business district of Flagstaff, it is mostly used for general aviation but is also served by two commercial airlines.

There is a Greyhound Bus Lines station in Flagstaff, with regular service east–west along Interstate 40, and also north–south service to Phoenix along Interstate 17.

Amtrak has a passenger railroad stations in Flagstaff and formerly in Williams, with daily service on the Southwest Chief to the east towards Chicago, and to the west towards Los Angeles.

The Grand Canyon Railway, a tourist railroad, links Williams with the canyon's South Rim in the Grand Canyon National Park and has service every day except Christmas.

The Mountain Line provides public transportation bus service in the Flagstaff area.

=== Major highways ===
- I-17
- I-40
  - BL 40 (Williams) – unsigned
  - BL 40 (Flagstaff)
- US 89
  - US 89A
- US 160
- US 180
- SR 64
- SR 66
- SR 67
- SR 87
- SR 89A
- SR 98
- SR 99
- SR 179
- SR 260
- SR 264
- SR 389

== Education ==
School districts include:

K-12:

- Ash Fork Joint Unified School District
- Flagstaff Unified School District
- Fredonia-Moccasin Unified School District
- Grand Canyon Unified School District
- Page Unified School District
- Sedona-Oak Creek Unified School District - Established in 1991
- Tuba City Unified School District
- Williams Unified School District

Elementary:

- Chevelon Butte School District
- Maine Consolidated School District

According to Coconino County's parcel viewer, some reservation areas are in the "Unorganized School District #00". According to Arizona law, an unorganized school district is one that does not have a high school. The 2010 U.S. census school district map for Coconino County shows areas in the Havasupai and Hualapai reservations as being in "School District Not Defined". Areas not in school districts are under the jurisdiction of the respective County Superintendent of Schools.

Charter schools:

- Flagstaff Arts and Leadership Academy
- Northland Preparatory Academy

Bureau of Indian Education (BIE)-operated and affiliated tribal schools

- Greyhills Academy High School
- Havasupai Elementary School (BIE-operated)
- Kaibeto Boarding School (BIE-operated)
- Leupp Schools, Inc.
- Tuba City Boarding School (BIE-operated)

Tertiary education:

- Coconino County Community College
- Diné College Tuba City Center
- Northern Arizona University

== See also ==
- National Register of Historic Places listings in Coconino County, Arizona
- USS Coconino County (LST-603)
