= Winslow Unified School District =

School district in Arizona, United States

Address
- 800 North Apache Avenue Winslow, Arizona, 86047; United States

District information
- Type: Public
- Grades: PreK–12
- NCES District ID: 0409460

Students and staff
- Students: 1,840
- Teachers: 101.63
- Staff: 141.5
- Student–teacher ratio: 18.1

Other information
- Website: www.wusd1.org

The Winslow Unified School District is the school district for Winslow, Arizona. It includes three elementary schools (Washington, Jefferson, and Bonnie Brennan); a junior high school; and Winslow High School. The superintendent is Connie Gover.

The district includes Winslow, the Navajo County portion of Winslow West, and a portion of Seba Dalkai.

The Chevelon Butte School District, which does not operate any schools, previously sent its Blue Ridge area students to Winslow USD.
