= Katie Pavlich =

American journalist (born 1988)

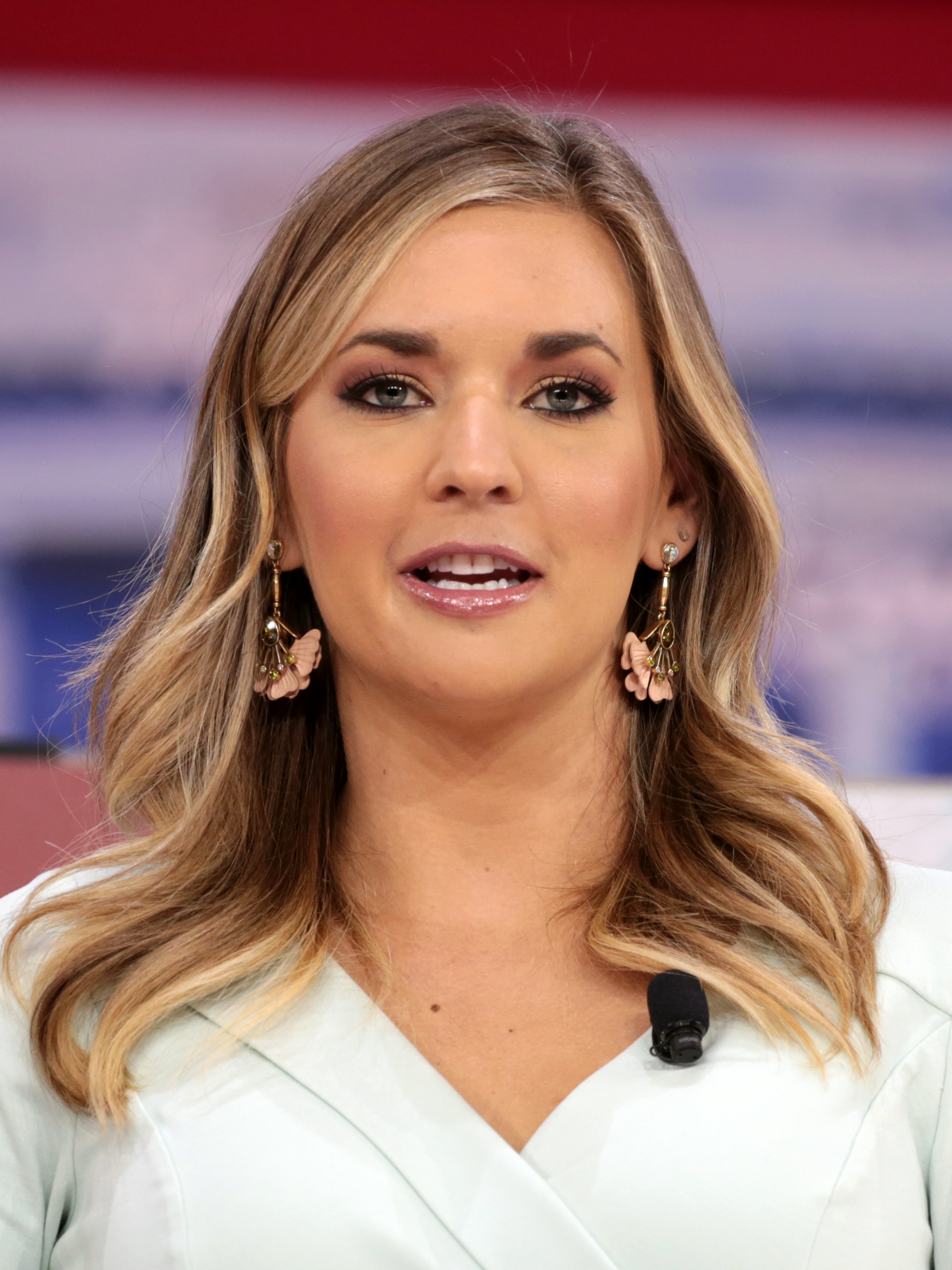
- Pavlich in 2018
- Born: Catherine Merri Pavlich; July 10, 1988 (age 38); Phoenix, Arizona, U.S.
- Education: University of Arizona (BA)
- Employer: NewsNation
- Spouse: Gavy Friedson (m. 2017)
- Website: katiepavlich.com

Catherine Merri Pavlich (born July 10, 1988) is an American author, blogger, and podcaster. Previously part of Townhall.com and Fox News, she joined NewsNation in December 2025 and began hosting her own political talk show Katie Pavlich Tonight in January 2026.

== Early life and education ==
Pavlich was born in Phoenix, Arizona, to a family of Croat and German descent. She grew up in the mountainous areas of northern Arizona, where she developed interests in outdoor activities such as river rafting and hunting. Pavlich graduated from Sinagua High School in Flagstaff, where she played volleyball and basketball.

In 2010, Pavlich earned a Bachelor of Arts degree in broadcast journalism from the University of Arizona. As an adult woman with eligible ancestry, she became a member of the Daughters of the American Revolution.

While working on her degree, Pavlich got her start in media as a regular guest on radio host Jon Justice's morning show, which aired on KQTH "The Truth" in Tucson. Pavlich continued to regularly appear on Justice's show after he moved to KTLK in Minneapolis in 2014, appearing almost weekly until 2025.

== Career ==
Pavlich moved to the Washington, D.C., area and became news editor for Townhall.com, a contributing editor to Townhall Magazine, and a Fox News contributor. In the summer of 2013, she became an alternate co-host for The Five, a panel talk show on Fox News Channel. She was also a National Review Washington Fellow.

Pavlich has appeared on media outlets including Fox News, CNN, MSNBC, CNBC, and Fox Business. Starting in 2018, she co-hosted the podcast Everything's Going to Be All Right with former White House Press Secretary Sean Spicer. Due to poor ratings, the podcast ended shortly after its first episode.

The Conservative Political Action Conference named her 2013 Blogger of the Year. The Clare Boothe Luce Policy Institute gave her the 2014 Woman of the Year Award, and the 2013 Conservative Leadership Award.

In 2022, Pavlich hosted Fox Nation's lifestyle show Luxury Hunting Lodges of America, where she traveled to numerous resort-like hunting and fishing accommodations from Louisiana to Wyoming.

She authored the books Fast and Furious: Barack Obama's Bloodiest Scandal and Its Shameless Cover-Up (2012) and Assault & Flattery: The Truth About the Left and Their War on Women (2014).

On October 31, 2025, Pavlich resigned from her news editor position at Townhall.com. She also resigned from her contributor position from Fox News. On December 15, 2025, NewsNation announced Pavlich would be hosting a new political talk show Katie Pavlich Tonight at 10 p.m. ET. It debuted on January 19, 2026.

The premiere episode of Katie Pavlich Tonight drew in 58,000 viewers (including 12,000 in the 25–54 key demographic). The next day's episode featured her interview with U.S. President Donald Trump, to mark the first anniversary of his second inauguration. It was watched by 75,000 viewers (including 10,000 in the 25–54 key demographic), which was far behind in viewership numbers when compared to other programs on competing networks.

=== Political commentary ===
On the March 19, 2019, broadcast of the Fox News show Outnumbered, Pavlich said that America was the first country to end slavery within 150 years, and receives no credit for it. The remark was disputed by PolitiFact, which noted that countries that outlawed slavery earlier and more quickly than the U.S. included El Salvador, Mexico, Chile, Argentina and Venezuela. In a reversal, she later said she had misspoken, meaning to say that America was "one of" the first countries to end slavery within 150 years "from the point of its founding".

In September 2019, Pavlich questioned Greta Thunberg's global warming activism, saying "She claims that there needs to be more information about the quote 'science,' but actually on the other side there needs to be more information about the hundreds of scientists who actually disagree with the projections of climate change."
