= Doney Park, Arizona =

CDP in Coconino County, Arizona

Doney Park
- Unincorporated town CDP
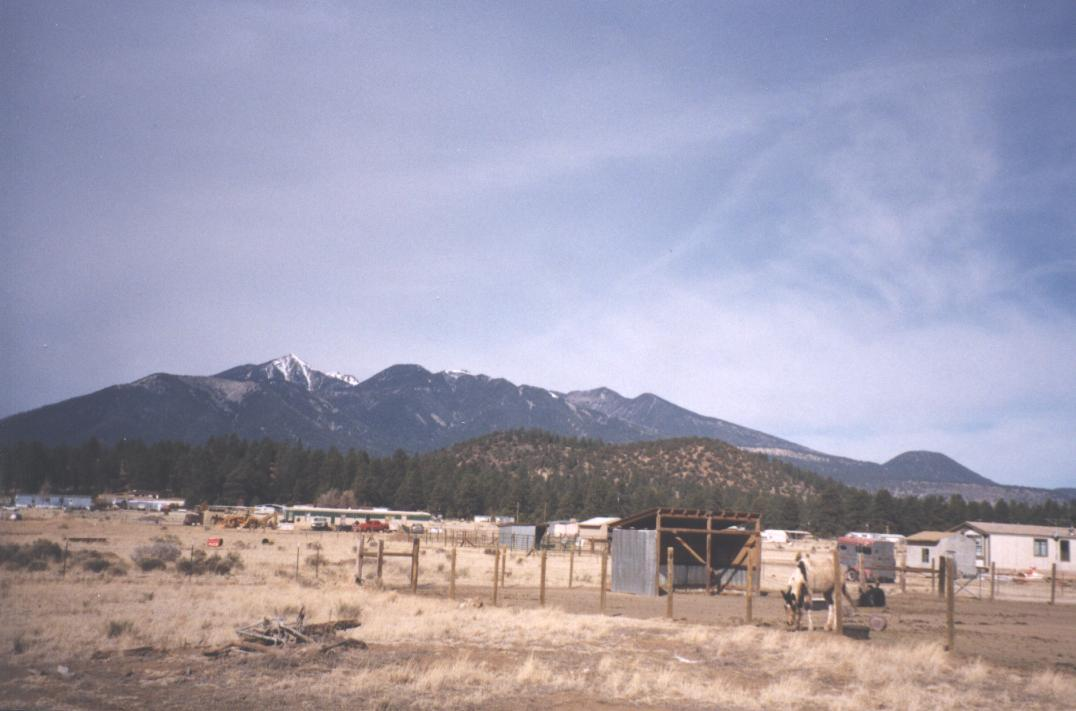
- View of San Francisco Peaks from Doney Park

- Location of Doney Park in Coconino County, Arizona

- Location in the United States
- Coordinates: 35°16′12″N 111°31′3″W
- Country: United States
- State: Arizona
- County: Coconino

Area
  - Total: 14.95 sq mi (38.73 km^{2})
  - Land: 14.95 sq mi (38.73 km^{2})
  - Water: 0 sq mi (0.00 km^{2})
- Elevation: 6,555 ft (1,998 m)

Population (2010)
  - Total: 3,894
- Time zone: UTC-7 (MST)
  - Summer (DST): UTC-7 (MST)
- ZIP code: 86004
- Area code: 928
- FIPS code: 04-76010
- GNIS feature ID: 2582772

Doney Park is a census-designated place in Coconino County, Arizona, United States. It is a residential area northeast of Flagstaff, located off U.S. Route 89 and is in the 86004 zip code.

The area is named for Kevin Doney, a northern Arizona pioneer. Many of the homes in this community are on lots of one acre or larger. The area is known for its views of the San Francisco Peaks and Sunset Crater Volcano.

== Demographics ==
=== 2020 census ===
As of the 2020 census, Doney Park had a population of 5,910. The median age was 43.6 years. 22.3% of residents were under the age of 18 and 18.5% of residents were 65 years of age or older. For every 100 females there were 98.7 males, and for every 100 females age 18 and over there were 97.3 males age 18 and over.

59.0% of residents lived in urban areas, while 41.0% lived in rural areas.

There were 2,087 households in Doney Park, of which 30.4% had children under the age of 18 living in them. Of all households, 62.7% were married-couple households, 13.4% were households with a male householder and no spouse or partner present, and 17.1% were households with a female householder and no spouse or partner present. About 18.4% of all households were made up of individuals and 9.0% had someone living alone who was 65 years of age or older.

There were 2,219 housing units, of which 5.9% were vacant. The homeowner vacancy rate was 0.6% and the rental vacancy rate was 2.4%.

Racial composition as of the 2020 census
| Race | Number | Percent |
|---|---|---|
| White | 4,248 | 71.9% |
| Black or African American | 26 | 0.4% |
| American Indian and Alaska Native | 628 | 10.6% |
| Asian | 40 | 0.7% |
| Native Hawaiian and Other Pacific Islander | 12 | 0.2% |
| Some other race | 267 | 4.5% |
| Two or more races | 689 | 11.7% |
| Hispanic or Latino (of any race) | 861 | 14.6% |

=== 2010 census ===
As of the 2010 census, the population of Doney Park was 5,395.

== Education ==
It is in the Flagstaff Unified School District.

The zoned secondary schools are Sinagua Middle School and Coconino High School.
