= Michael Slobodchikoff =

American political scientist

Michael O. Slobodchikoff
- Education: Georgetown University, Thunderbird School of Global Management, University of Arizona
- Father: Con Slobodchikoff

Michael O. Slobodchikoff is an American political scientist in the political science department at Troy University. Slobodchikoff specializes in international relations scholarship concerning the foreign policy of Russia and other post-soviet states. He earned his Ph.D. in Political Science from the University of Arizona in 2012 and speaks Russian, French, and German.

== Research and Works ==
=== Research ===
Slobodchikoff's research centers around Russian foreign policy and their accent to regional hegemony as well as, treaty networks, Indian foreign policy, and the international relations phenomena known as Treaty Nesting. Slobodchikoff has posited that treaty networks are a way of studying and understanding the liberal international order and the various challenges to the status-quo.

=== 2019 NATO Conference ===
In 2019, Slobodchikoff and G. Doug Davis were awarded the NATO Public Diplomacy Grant, and hosted the “NATO at Seventy: A Strategic Examination of the Past, Present, and Future of the Atlantic Alliance” at the Troy University Montgomery Campus in Montgomery, Alabama. This conference focused on the role that NATO would play following its 70th anniversary along with what obstacles the alliance may encounter. Speakers at this event included Ambassador Robert Hunter, Romanian Ambassador George Cristian Maior, Poland's Military Attaché to the United States Major General Cezary Wisniewski, along with diplomatic representatives from Lithuania, Latvia, and Croatia.

=== Publications ===
Slobodchikoff has authored and co-authored five books. These include “The Challenge to NATO: Global Security and the Atlantic Alliance” co-authored with G. Doug Davis and Brandon Stewart and “India as Kingmaker: Status Quo or Revisionist Power” co-authored with Aakriti A. Tandon. Slobodchikoff has also authored and co-authored thirty peer-reviewed articles centered on international relations, conflict processes, and comparative politics.

== Media appearances ==
Slobodchikoff is a regular contributor to Russia Direct, the Russian International Affairs Council and has often provided analysis on Russian relations with Ukraine for BBC World News. He has served as an analyst on Russian relations with the United States for Voice of Russia Radio. Slobodchikoff was a go to person for several news agencies including the BBC, providing up to date analysis as the situation developed. Likewise, when Malaysia Airlines Flight 17 (MH17) was shot down over Ukraine in 2014, Slobodchikoff provided expert analysis on what could be expected from the outcome of the tragedy. In February 2022, Slobodchikoff joined BBC World News to comment on the meeting between French President Emmanuel Macron and Russian President Vladimir Putin during the ongoing 2021–2022 Russo-Ukrainian crisis. Slobodchikoff has also contributed to Newsweek, commenting on domestic politics in Kazakhstan.
