= Museum of Northern Arizona =

Museum in Coconino County, Arizona

Coordinates: 35°14′06″N 111°39′44″W

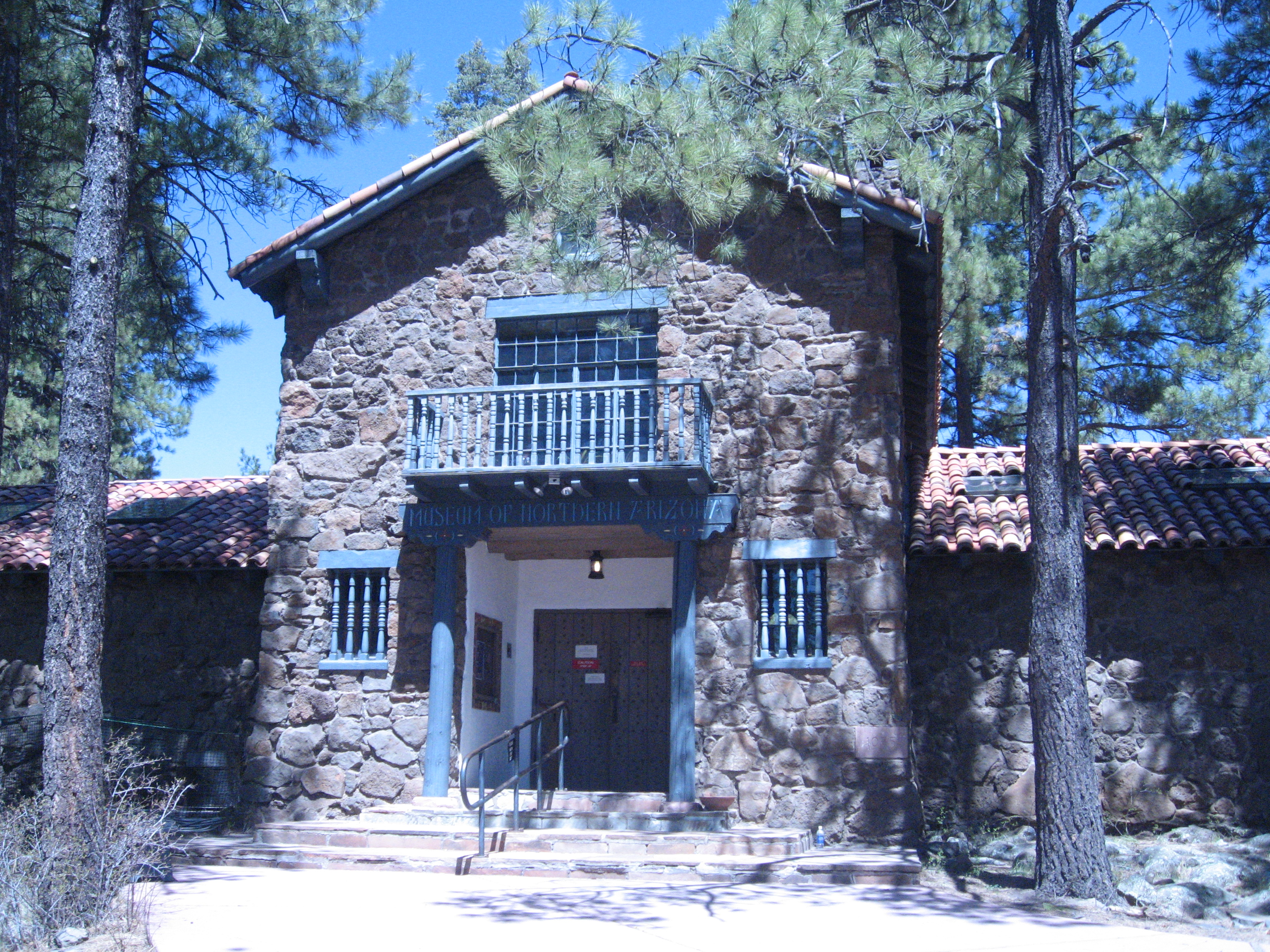
Museum of Northern Arizona in Flagstaff

The Museum of Northern Arizona is a museum in Flagstaff, Arizona, United States, established as a repository for Indigenous material and natural history specimens from the Colorado Plateau.

The museum was founded in 1928 by zoologist Dr. Harold S. Colton and artist Mary-Russell Ferrell Colton from Philadelphia, Pennsylvania, and is dedicated to preserving the history and cultures of northern Arizona and the Colorado Plateau.

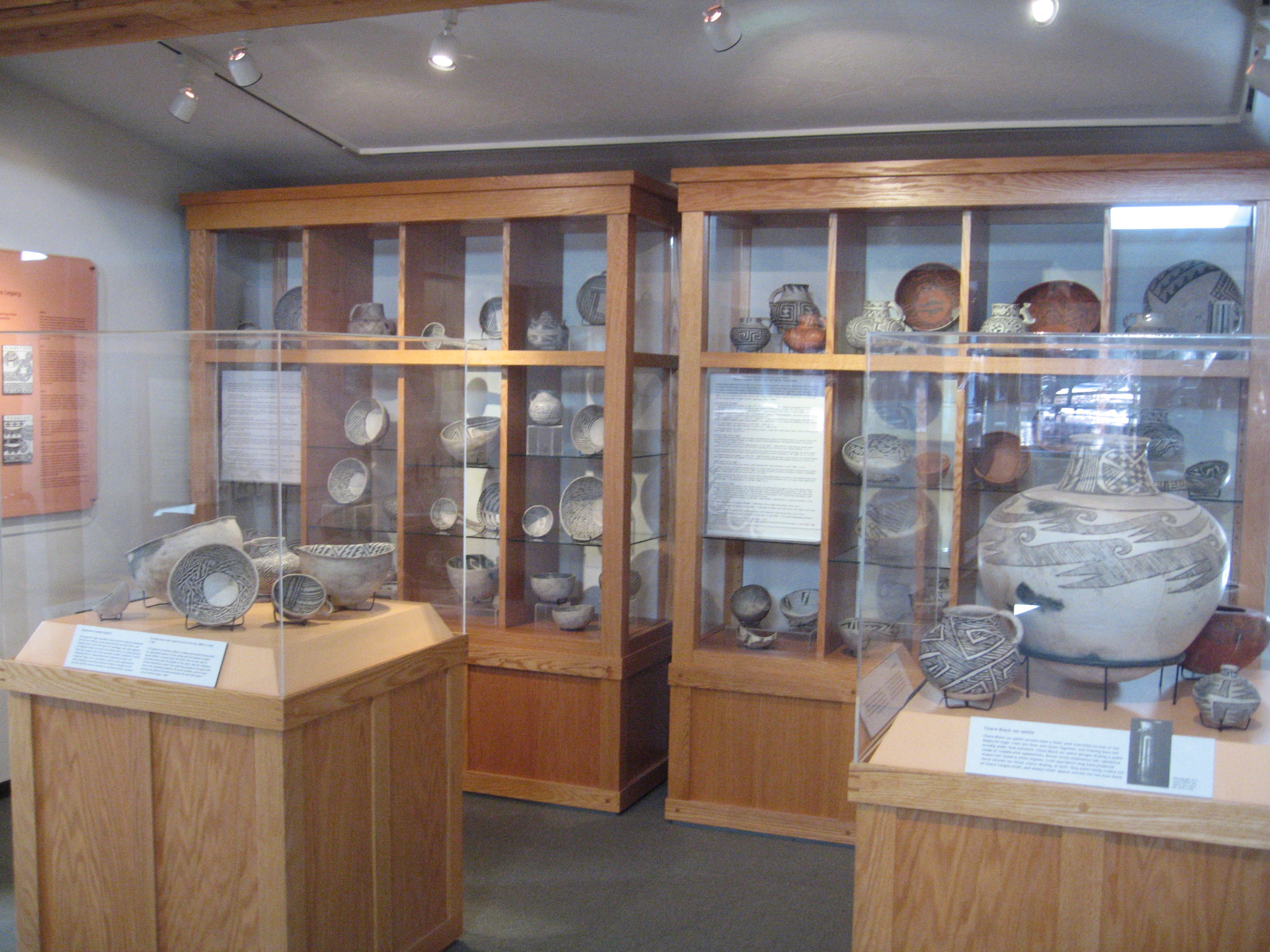
Ceramic vessels in the Babbitt Gallery

The museum has a cultural and research center, the Colton House, located outside of Flagstaff and is a member of the North American Reciprocal Museums program.

== History ==
Harold Sellers Colton a zoology professor at the University of Pennsylvania and Mary-Russell Ferrell Colton moved to Flagstaff in 1926, helping found the Museum of Northern Arizona in 1928. Harold became director and Marry-Russell became curator of art and ethnology.

In 1930, Katharine Bartlett, a physical anthropologist from Denver, became curator and would remain so for the next 51 years.

The private, nonprofit organization grew from two rooms in the Flagstaff Woman's Club to a 24,700-square-foot Exhibits building. Research and collections facilities are adjacent. The Ethnology Gallery focuses on the Hopi, Zuni, Navajo, and Pai tribes.
