= Blue Ridge, Arizona =

Census-designated place in Coconino County, Arizona, United States

- Census-designated place
- Location within Arizona Location within the United States
- Coordinates: 34°38′08″N 111°09′18″W
- Country: United States
- State: Arizona
- County: Coconino

Area
  - Total: 19.10 sq mi (49.46 km^{2})
  - Land: 19.10 sq mi (49.46 km^{2})
  - Water: 0 sq mi (0.00 km^{2})
- Elevation: 6,805 ft (2,074 m)

Population (2020)
  - Total: 594
  - Density: 31.1/sq mi (12.01/km^{2})
- Time zone: UTC-7 (MST)
  - Summer (DST): UTC-6 (MDT)
- ZIP Code: 86024 (Happy Jack)
- FIPS code: 04-06997
- GNIS feature ID: 2805211

Blue Ridge is a census-designated place (CDP) in Coconino County, Arizona, United States. It was first listed as a CDP prior to the 2020 census.

== Demographics ==
Historical population
Census	Pop.	Note	%±
2020	594		—
U.S. Decennial Census

== Education ==
Most of Blue Ridge is in Chevelon Butte School District. The rest of Blue Ridge is in the Flagstaff Unified School District.

The Chevelon Butte District does not operate any schools. It sends its Blue Ridge area students to Pine Strawberry School District for elementary school, and Payson Unified School District (which operates Payson High School) for secondary school. Chevelon Butte Blue Ridge area students were previously sent to Winslow Unified School District. The zoned secondary schools for the Flagstaff USD portion are Mount Elden Middle School and Flagstaff High School.

== See also ==
- List of census-designated places in Arizona
