= Red Rock, Yavapai County, Arizona =

Unincorporated community in the state of Arizona, United States

Red Rock, Arizona
- Populated place
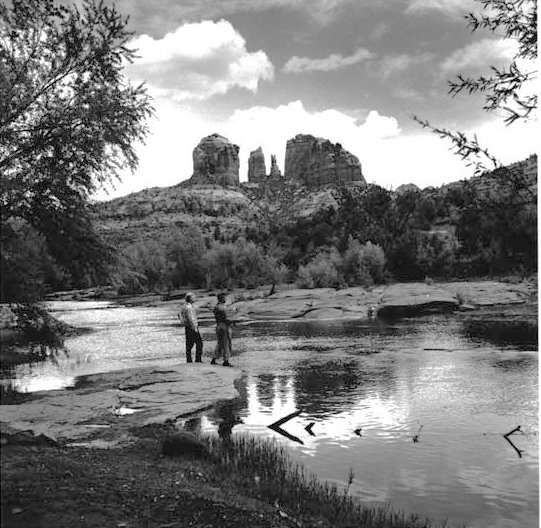
- Red Rock Crossing in 1959

- Location within Arizona Location within the United States
- Coordinates: 34°49′32″N 111°49′00″W
- Country: United States
- State: Arizona
- County: Yavapai
- Elevation: 3,977 ft (1,212 m)
- Time zone: UTC-7 (Mountain (MST))
- Area code: 928
- GNIS feature ID: 33497

Red Rock is a place in Yavapai County, Arizona, United States. Red Rock is 4.5 miles (7.2 km) southwest of Sedona.

Red Rock Crossing is a former ford across Oak Creek with views of Cathedral Rock. The crossing was washed out in a flood in 1978, and there are no current plans to reopen it to automobile traffic. Most of the crossing is included in the Coconino National Forest's Crescent Moon Ranch recreation area.

Baldwins Crossing is an alternate name for the ford.

== Education ==
Red Rock is in the Sedona-Oak Creek Unified School District.

Previously Red Rock was in the Red Rock School District, which did not operate any schools and sent students to Flagstaff Unified School District, which at the time operated Sedona School, along with Flagstaff High School. Circa 1959 to 1963 Flagstaff USD administrators told Red Rock that the Red Rock district should create an in-house school. Circa 1963 Flagstaff USD administrators told the Red Rock district that soon it may not be able to continue having students from Red Rock. That year, a bill to create a new bi-county school district that would take over the Sedona-Oak Creek district and take territory from Flagstaff USD had been introduced in the Arizona Legislature.

== Gallery ==
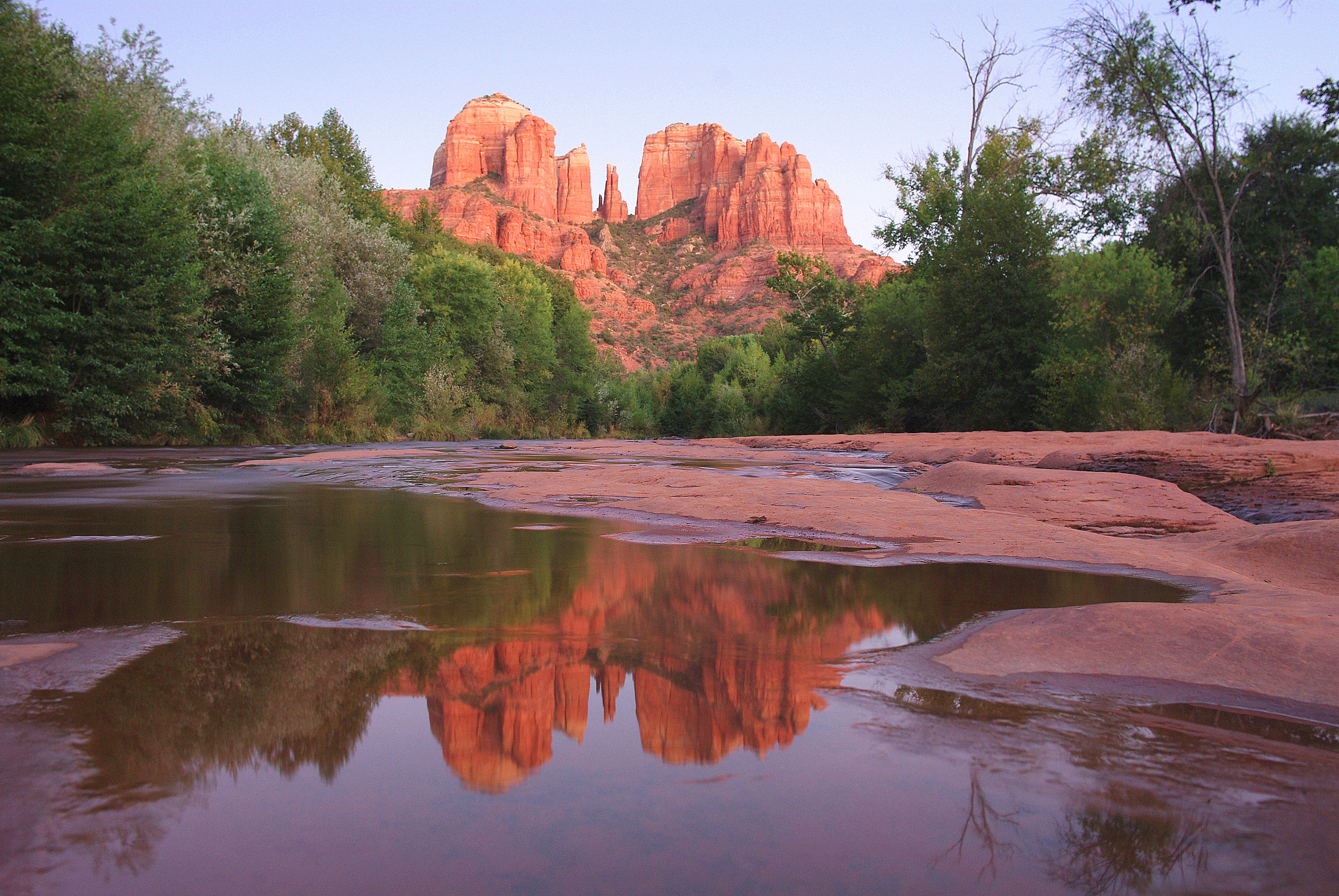
Cathedral Rock at Red Rock Crossing, 2009

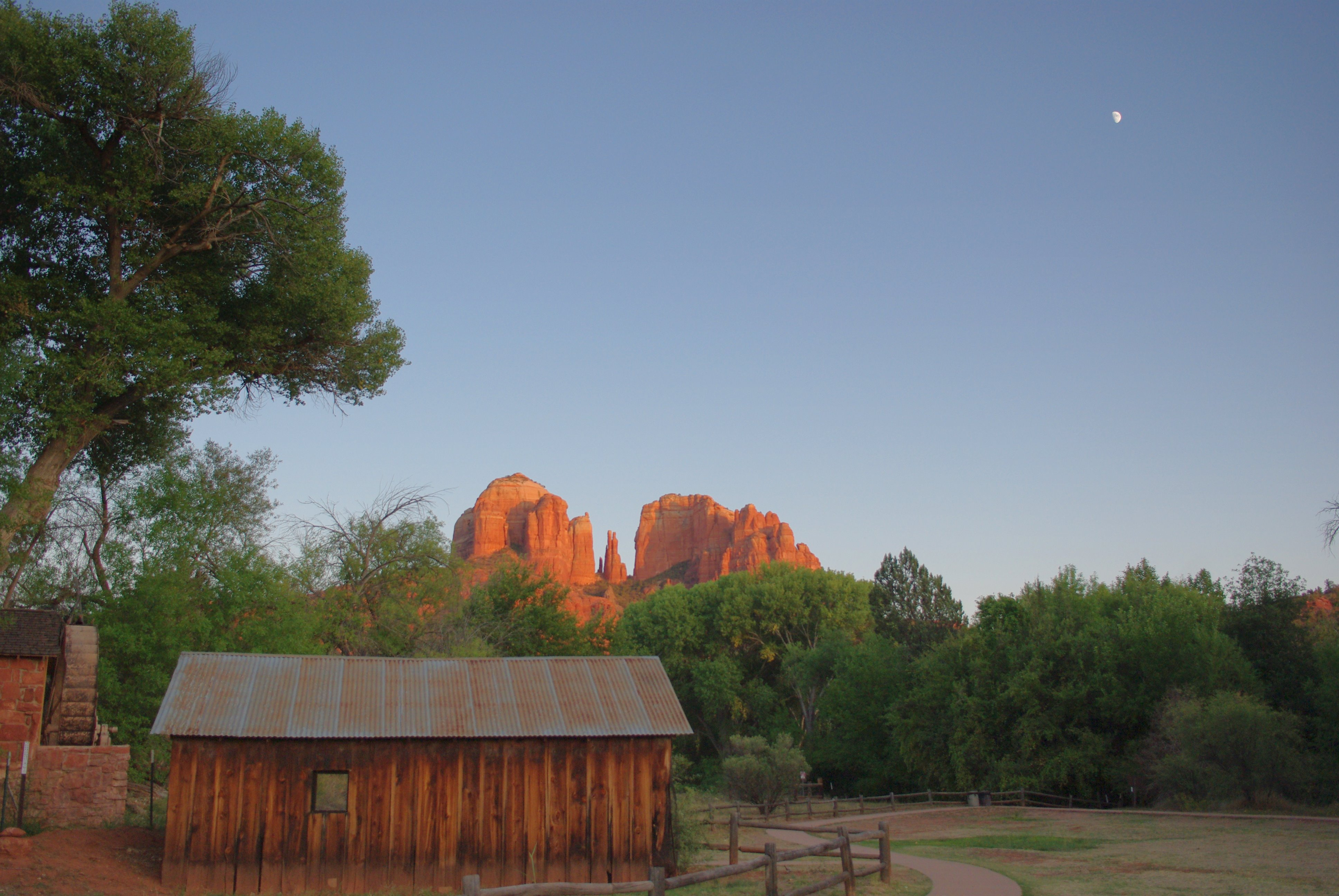
Cathedral Rock over the old mill at Crescent Moon picnic area
