= Sedona-Oak Creek Unified School District =

School district in Yavapai County, Arizona

The Sedona-Oak Creek Unified School District (SOCUSD) is a school district headquartered in Sedona, Arizona. It operates Sedona Red Rock High School as well as the West Sedona School, which serves students in grades K through 6.

The district includes portions of Yavapai and Coconino counties. It includes Sedona, as well as Village of Oak Creek (Big Park). It also includes Red Rock.

The formal name is Sedona-Oak Creek Joint Unified School District No. 9 of Yavapai and Coconino Counties.

== History ==
In December 1990 a referendum involving voters in both Yavapai and Coconino counties was held on whether this district should be created. 2,321 of 2,509 voters approved creating this district, a result characterized by the Arizona Daily Sun as a "landslide". The district came into existence after June 30, 1991. The district included land formerly in the Flagstaff Unified School District, Cottonwood-Oak Creek Elementary School District, and Mingus Union High School District.

There had been a previous proposal submitted to the Arizona Legislature to create a bi-county school district in the area in the 1960s.

At the time the Sedona district formed, Sedona students continued to attend Flagstaff for high school. The majority of the territory of the district was created was in Yavapai County, along with most of the voting base, so Yavapai County became the district's county of jurisdiction.

== Schools ==
- West Sedona School (K-6)
  - Flagstaff USD previously operated the elementary school in Sedona. The facility has a community swimming pool which opened in 1975. It was formerly a K-8 school. In 2008 many older buildings were replaced with new ones.
- Sedona Red Rock High School (7-12)
- Red Rock Academy (K-12, alternative)

It previously operated the K–8 school Big Park Community School, which opened in 1994. However, the school district voted in May 2020 to close the school due to budget deficit concerns. According to Randy Hawley, a member of the board of trustees, the district was having trouble having enough money to operate Big Park Community School, and the number of students had declined.
