= Colton House =

- Coyote Range
- U.S. National Register of Historic Places
- Location within Arizona
- Nearest city: Flagstaff, Arizona
- Area: 4 acres (1.6 ha)
- Built: 1906–1934
- Built by: Unkefer Bros.
- Architect: Ralph A. Colton
- Architectural style: Late 19th and 20th Century Revivals, Bungalow/craftsman
- NRHP reference No.: 84000641
- Added to NRHP: May 14, 1984

The Colton House, also known as Coyote Range and listed under that name on the National Register of Historic Places, was built in 1928. A 4 acres (1.6 ha) portion of its property, including six contributing buildings built during 1906–1934, was NRHP-listed in 1984.

It is a cultural center of the Museum of Northern Arizona.

It was home of Dr. Harold S. Colton (1881–1970), an archeologist who taught at the University of Pennsylvania from 1909 until he retired in 1926, and Mary-Russell Ferrell Colton (1889–1971). The couple acquired 100 acres (40 ha) in what is now termed Coyote Springs, and they co-founded the Museum of Northern Arizona, which is located adjacent (or nearly adjacent) to the current Colton House property. Dr. Colton served as its Director until 1958, and continued as president of MNA's board of directors until his death in 1970.

The Colton's 100 acres, just 3 miles (4.8 km) out of Flagstaff, included "Malpais Manor", which was a large one-story Craftsman bungalow. The property also included a large barn and some other buildings, and the Coltons designed and built more, including: the Annex, the Studio, the Pack Rat, and the Blue Jay House. These were largely built by Hopi laborers who lived on the site.

The Malpais Manor home was destroyed in a fire in 1928. The "new" house which replaced it in 1929 was designed by Philadelphia architect Ralph A. Colton, Harold's brother, and was built by contractor Unkefer Bros. of Pittsburg. It is also a Craftsman bungalow. It is Spanish Colonial Revival in style.

The listed complex's buildings were constructed between 1906 and 1934, built primarily of local "malpais rock" (basalt).

Music programs at the Colton House have included a music residency program, and there is at least one album title ("Colton House Sessions") referencing it.

Harold Colter was a zoologist, and to some extent an archeologist also, and Mary-Russell Ferrell Colton was an artist.

== Additional development ==
The first new home of the Coyote Springs was built in 1998. By 2000, it was considered "Flagstaff's premier community", with each property sitting on one to five acres, and all kept in a similar style to the Colton House, the original home on the property which was restored and also sits on the property. The Colton House serves as "a residential facility for guests of the museum; an intimate retreat center ... and a location for private receptions."
