= List of Portuguese sheep breeds =

This is a list of the sheep breeds usually considered to have originated in Portugal. Some may have complex or obscure histories, so inclusion here does not necessarily imply that a breed is predominantly or exclusively Portuguese.

Local name(s)	English name, if any	Notes	Image
Bordaleira de Entre Douro e Minho^{[1]}^{[2]}^{[3]}			
Campaniça^{[1]}^{[2]}^{[3]}			
Churra Algarvia^{[1]}^{[2]}^{[3]}	Algarve Churro		
Churra Badana^{[1]}^{[2]}^{[3]}			
Churra da Terra Quente^{[1]}^{[2]}^{[3]}			
Churra do Campo^{[1]}			
Churra do Minho^{[1]}			
Churra Galega Bragançana Branca^{[1]}			
Churra Galega Bragançana Preta^{[1]}			
Churra Galega Mirandesa^{[1]}^{[2]}^{[3]}			
Churra Mondegueira^{[1]}^{[2]}^{[3]}			
Merina Branca^{[1]}^{[2]}^{[3]}			
Merina da Beira Baixa^{[1]}^{[2]}^{[3]}			
Merina Preta^{[1]}^{[2]}^{[3]}			
Saloia^{[1]}^{[2]}^{[3]}			
Serra da Estrela^{[1]}^{[2]}^{[3]}			
