= List of communities on the Navajo Nation =

This is a list of communities on the Navajo Nation, including the checkerboard, arranged alphabetically.

Name in English	Name in Navajo	County	Population				
Name in English	Name in Navajo	County	Population	Alamo	Tʼiistoh	Socorro, NM	1,150
Aneth	Tʼáá Bííchʼį́įdii	San Juan, UT	598				
Beclabito	Bitłʼááh Bitoʼ	San Juan, NM	265				
Becenti	Tłʼóoʼditsin	McKinley, NM	294				
Bitter Springs	Díchʼíító	Coconino, AZ	355				
Borrego Pass	Dibé Yázhí Habitiin	McKinley, NM	117				
Brimhall Nizhoni	Maʼii Tééh Yitłizhí	McKinley, NM	286				
Burnside	Naʼashǫ́ʼiitoʼí	Apache, AZ	494				
Cameron	Naʼníʼá Hasání	Coconino, AZ	734				
Chilchinbito	Tsiiłchin Biiʼ Tó	Navajo, AZ	769				
Chinle	Chíńlį́	Apache, AZ	4,573				
Church Rock	Kinłitsosinil	McKinley, NM	1,542				
Counselor	Bilagáana Nééz	Sandoval, NM	999				
Crownpoint	Tʼiistsʼóóz Ńdeeshgizh	McKinley, NM	2,900				
Crystal	Tóniłtsʼílí	San Juan and McKinley, NM	302				
Dennehotso	Deinihootso	Apache, AZ	587				
Dilkon	Tsézhin Dilkǫǫh	Navajo, AZ	1,194				
Fort Defiance	Tséhootsooí	Apache, AZ	3,541				
Ganado	Lókʼaahnteel	Apache, AZ	883				
Greasewood	Díwózhii Biiʼ Tó	Navajo, AZ	372				
Halchita	Halchíítah	San Juan, UT	270				
Houck	Maʼiitoʼí	Apache, AZ	886				
Huerfano	Hanáádlį́	San Juan, NM	104				
Hunters Point	Tsé Naachiiʼ	Apache, AZ	-				
Indian Wells	Tó Hahadleeh	Navajo, AZ	232				
Iyanbito	Ayání Bitoʼ	McKinley, NM	1,193				
Jeddito	Jádító	Navajo, AZ	346				
Kaibeto	Kʼaiʼbiiʼtó	Coconino, AZ	1,540				
Kayenta	Tó Dínéeshzheeʼ	Navajo, AZ	4,670				
Kinlichee	Kin Dah Łichííʼ	Apache, AZ	1,382				
Klagetoh	Łeeyiʼtó	Apache, AZ	181				
Lake Valley	Beʼekʼid Halgaii	San Juan, NM	64				
LeChee	Łichíiʼii	Coconino, AZ	1,236				
Leupp	Tsiizizii	Coconino, AZ	934				
Lukachukai	Lókʼaaʼchʼégai	Apache, AZ	1,424				
Many Farms	Dáʼákʼeh Halání	Apache, AZ	1,243				
Montezuma Creek	Díwózhii Bikooh	San Juan, UT	507				
Nageezi	Naayízí	San Juan, NM	277				
Nakaibito	Naakaii Bitoʼ	McKinley, NM	355				
Navajo	Niʼiijíhí	McKinley, NM	1,942				
Navajo Mountain	Naatsisʼáán	San Juan, UT	450				
Nazlini	Názlíní	Apache, AZ	505				
Nanahnezad	Niinahnízaad	San Juan, NM	576				
Newcomb	Bis Deezʼáhí	San Juan, NM	494				
Oak Springs	Teeł Chʼínítʼiʼ	Apache, AZ	54				
Ojo Amarillo	Tó Łitsooí	San Juan, NM	696				
Ojo Encino	Chéchʼiizh Biiʼ Tó	McKinley, NM	222				
Oljato-Monument Valley	Ooljééʼtó	Navajo, AZ	115				
Oljato-Monument Valley	Ooljééʼtó	San Juan, UT	864				
Pinon	Beʼekʼid Baa Ahoodzání	Navajo, AZ	1,084				
Pinedale	Tό Bééhwiisgání	McKinley, NM	485				
Pine Springs	Tʼiis Ííʼáhí	Apache, AZ	-				
Prewitt	Kin Łigaaí	McKinley, NM	842				
Pueblo Pintado	Náhodeeshgiizh Chʼínílíní	McKinley, NM	318				
Ramah	Tł'ohchiní	Cibola and McKinley, NM	2,167				
Red Lake	Beʼekʼid Halchííʼ	Coconino, AZ	1,680				
Red Mesa	Tsé Łichííʼ Dah Azkání	Apache, AZ	354				
Rock Point	Tsé Nitsaa Deezʼáhí	Apache, AZ	552				
Rough Rock	Tséchʼízhí	Apache, AZ	428				
Round Rock	Tsé Nikání	Apache, AZ	640				
Sanostee	Tséʼałnáoztʼiʼí	San Juan, NM	322				
Sawmill	Niʼiijííh Hasání	Apache, AZ	564				
Sheep Springs	Tó Hałtsooí	San Juan, NM	262				
Shonto	Shą́ą́ʼtóhí	Navajo, AZ	494				
Shiprock	Naatʼáanii Nééz	San Juan, NM	7,718				
Smith Lake	Tsin Názbąs Siʼą́	McKinley, NM	1,044				
Smoke Signal	Łid Néigahí	Navajo, AZ	-				
St. Michaels	Tsʼíhootso	Apache, AZ	1,384				
Steamboat	Hóyééʼ	Apache, AZ	235				
Teec Nos Pos	T’iis Názbąs	Apache, AZ	507				
Thoreau	Dlǫ́ʼí Yázhí	McKinley, NM	2,367				
To'Hajiilee	Tó Hajiileehé	Cibola, Sandoval, and Bernalillo, NM	1,649				
Tohatchi	Tó Haachʼiʼ	McKinley, NM	785				
Tonalea	Tó Nehelį́į́h	Coconino, AZ	451				
Tsaile	Tsééhílį́	Apache, AZ	1,408				
Tse Bonito	Tsé Binííʼtóhí	McKinley, NM	380				
Tselakai Dezza	Tséłgaii Deezʼáhí	San Juan, UT	103				
Tuba City	Tó Naneesdizí	Coconino, AZ	8,072				
Twin Lakes	Tsénáhádzoh, Bááhaztł’ah	McKinley, NM	1,004				
Tolani Lake	To'ne'heliih	Coconino, AZ	227				
Upper Fruitland	Doo Alkʼahii	San Juan, NM	1,623				
White Rock	Tséłgaii	San Juan, NM	60				
Wide Ruins	Kinteel	Apache, AZ	20				
Window Rock	Tségháhoodzání	Apache, AZ	2,500				
Yah-ta-hey	Tʼáá Bííchʼį́įdii	McKinley, NM	757				
