= Martha Gorman Schultz =

American Diné weaver (1931–2025)

- Born: Martha Gorman; 1931; Leupp, Arizona U.S.
- Died: February 21, 2025 (aged 93)
- Years active: 1950s–2020s
- Movement: Navajo weaving
- Spouse: Billy Schultz (m.)
- Children: 13, including Marilou Schultz
- Relatives: Melissa Cody (granddaughter)

Martha Gorman Schultz (1931 – February 21, 2025) was an American Diné (Navajo) weaver. She was known for her Navajo rugs and had been an active weaver from the 1950s until the 2020s. Gorman Schultz also dyed her own wool in natural colors, shorn from Churro sheep. She lived for many years in Winslow, Arizona.

== Background ==
Martha Gorman Schultz was born as Martha Gorman in 1931, in Leupp, Arizona, and was of the Tábą́ą́há (Water's Edge clan; maternal side) and the Todích'íí'nii (Bitter Water Clan; paternal side). Gorman Schultz was the second of five children, and learned weaving from her mother Jasbah (Mary) Gorman Clay at age eight. As a child, she herded sheep and had planned to attend Leupp Boarding School prior to its closure in 1942.

She was married to Billy Schultz and they had thirteen children, including weaver Marilou Schultz. She gave birth to her first child in 1951. Billy Schultz was often away from home, as he worked for a railroad development company, so Gorman Schultz's weaving supplemented the family's income. She kept a flock of Churro sheep, and sold the lambs to help pay for her children's school uniforms. Her granddaughter is weaver Melissa Cody.

Gorman Schultz died on February 21, 2025, at the age of 93.

== Work and career ==
Gorman Schultz worked in the "Two Grey Hills" and also the "Storm" styles of weaving using hand-dyed and hand-spun wool from her own Churro sheep. She also worked in the "Crystal" and "Wide Ruins" styles. Later she worked in the "Germantown" style that incorporated synthetic dyes that allowed for brighter colors.

Her work was shown at the Heard Museum's Heard Indian Fair and Market for many years. In 1990 Gorman Schultz, she won an award for the best exhibition at the Santa Fe Indian Market. In 1996, she was awarded a Southwestern Association for Indian Arts (SWAIA) fellowship.

She continued to weave into her later years, making pieces until at least 2018.
