= Marilou Schultz =

Navajo textile artist, educator (born 1954)

- Born: November 6, 1954 (age 71); Safford, Arizona, US
- Citizenship: Navajo Nation, American
- Education: Arizona State University (BA, MA)
- Occupations: Weaver, math teacher
- Known for: Data-inspired Navajo weaving
- Notable work: Replica of a Chip (1994)
- Movement: Navajo weaving
- Mother: Martha Gorman Schultz
- Relatives: Melissa Cody (Diné), niece

Marilou Schultz (born November 6, 1954) is a Navajo weaver, artist, and educator. She has exhibited her weavings nationally and internationally, including at the documenta 14 in Kassel, Germany.

Schultz is a math teacher as well as an artist, and she is known for her science and data-inspired weavings.

== Early life and education ==
Marilou Schultz was born in Safford, Arizona, on November 6, 1954. Her mother is the respected weaver Martha Gorman Schultz. She is a citizen of the Navajo Nation and is born to Tábą́ą́há (Water's Edge Clan), and born for Tsi’naajinii (Black Streak Wood People Clan), and grew up in Leupp, Arizona, on the Navajo Reservation. At least four generations of her relatives, including her mother and great-great-grandmother, were also weavers. She is the aunt of textile artist Melissa Cody. She began learning the craft at the age of seven by watching her mother, and sold her weaved rugs during her childhood and into her college years.

Schultz attended Arizona State University (ASU) and received a bachelor's and master's degree in education, as well as a certificate for teaching mathematics from the Native American Education Leadership Program at ASU.

== Teaching career ==
Schultz is a math teacher in the Mesa Public Schools, and has served as a home-school liaison and coordinator for leadership and support programs for Native American youth.

In the summers, she teaches weaving workshops.

== Weaving ==
Although she began weaving as a means of financial support, her love of the craft has evolved into a method of innovation and sharing her culture with others. She utilizes traditional methods learned from her mother such as plain weave, twill and double twill, and raised outline weavings, though she has also developed unique dyeing techniques with both aniline and natural dyes. Natural dyes that she uses includes cochineal and indigo. She frequently uses wool from Churro sheep raised by her family. More inspirations for her work are rooted in the Navajo principal of Hózhó, witch emphasizes beauty, harmony, balance and cosmic order.

In 1994, Intel commissioned Schultz to weave her first major work, "Replica of a Chip," which depicted a Pentium microprocessor, a computer circuit board, and referenced the historical workforce of Navajo women assembling circuit boards at an Intel factory located on a Navajo reservation in New Mexico.

== Awards and honors ==
Schultz has won several awards at the Santa Fe Indian Market, including the Special Award for Excellence in Navajo Weaving in 1994, and the Challenge Award in Non-Traditional Weavings in 1997. She was also awarded a fellowship by the market's organization, SWAIA, in 1994. At the Heard Museum Guild Indian Fair and Market, Schultz received the inaugural Conrad House Innovation Award from the Heard Museum Guild in 2001.

== Selected exhibitions ==
Schultz exhibited from 2017 to 2018 at documenta 14 in Kassel, Germany. She has also shown internationally in U.S. Embassies.

Curators Velma Kee Craig (Diné), Natalia Miles (Diné/Akimel O'otham/Apache), and Ninabah Winton (Diné) featured Schultz's work in the Heard Museum's traveling survey of contemporary Navajo weaving, Color Riot!. This exhibition began at the Heard Museum in Phoenix, and traveling to venues nationwide, including the Montclair Art Museum in New Jersey and the Museum of Fine Arts, St. Petersburg in Florida.

Replica of a Chip was included in a 2024 exhibition, Woven Histories: Textiles and Modern Abstraction at the National Gallery of Art, which later traveled to the Museum of Modern Art.

In February 2026, the Hessel Museum of Art at Bard College announced they would exhibit the first survey of Schultz's work, Replica of a Chip: The Weaving Technology of Marilou Schultz later in the year.
