= Padre Canyon incident =

1899 skirmish between Navajo hunters and Arizona lawmen

Padre Canyon Incident
- Date: November 11, 1899
- Location: Near Leupp, Arizona, United States
- Deaths: 3

The Padre Canyon incident was a skirmish in November 1899 between a group of Navajo hunters and a posse of Arizona lawmen. Among other things, it was significant in that it nearly started a large-scale Indian war in Coconino County and it led to the expansion of the Navajo Reservation. It was also the final armed conflict during a land dispute between the Navajo and American settlers, as well as one of the bloodiest.

== Background ==
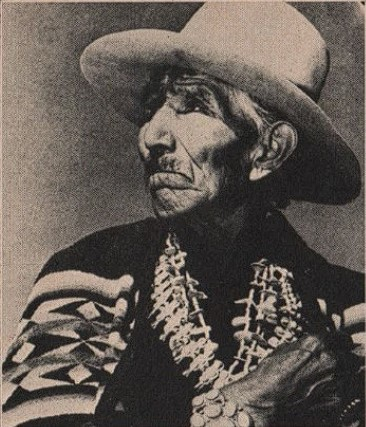
Chief B'ugoettin

In the 1880s and 1890s, the Navajo band of Chief B'ugoettin were fighting a minor, undeclared war with local cattlemen for control of what was later known as the Leupp Extension, a large area of rangeland between Flagstaff, the Hopi Reservation, and the Colorado River, which would later become part of the Navajo Reservation. When the trouble began, the Leupp Extension was owned by the Atlantic and Pacific Railroad, which acquired the land from the federal government through a grant. Like other railroads in the Old West, the Atlantic and Pacific sold unused land to pioneers, but, due to the Navajo presence in the Leupp Extension, pioneers were reluctant to buy land from them.

Eventually, cattlemen began moving their herds into the area, which only added tension to an already uneasy situation. Initially, the Navajo pleaded to the federal government for their help, but when that failed they retaliated by raiding for livestock. The cattlemen responded in a like manner, but for the most part, the violence was minimal. Usually, when the Navajo captured a thief they would beat him up and then send him on his way. As was the case in 1899.

William Henry Montgomery was a nineteen-year-old cowboy employed by William Roden Jr. According to some accounts, on November 6, Montgomery was caught trying to steal some ponies from a group of Navajo hunters so three of the natives assaulted him in the usual manner. Wanting revenge, Montgomery went to Flagstaff and persuaded the county to have warrants issued for the arrest of the three natives. Other accounts say that the posse was responding to allegations of deer poaching and the theft of horses from William Roden's ranch, but the exact cause for the issuing of the warrants remains uncertain.

To serve the warrants, Deputy Sheriff Dan Hogan formed a posse consisting of himself, William Montgomery, William Roden and Walter Durham, who was another cowboy from the Roden Ranch.

== Incident ==
On the morning of November 11, Hogan and Montgomery left Flagstaff and headed to the Roden Ranch, where they recruited Roden and Durham. From there the posse went east towards Padre Canyon. Later that afternoon, at the edge of Elliott Canyon, the posse spotted a small Navajo camp in the brush down below near the junction of Padre Canyon and Canyon Diablo. After dismounting and making their way down the canyon wall, they stealthily advanced on a wickiup that was occupied by an elderly man who was tanning deer hide.

At this time, four other Navajo men spotted Montgomery as they were walking back to camp from a hunting trip. Assuming he was there to steal horses, the Navajos immediately opened fire on Montgomery, striking him in the heart and killing him instantly. A shootout ensued and it was later described by the Coconino Sun as being "one of the most desperate conflicts ever to be fought in the Southwest."

The Navajo fire was accurate so the posse was forced to retreat at sundown. Fearing they would be too exposed by climbing back up the canyon wall, the possemen made their way south to a nearby railroad and on the following morning they succeeded in stopping a train for a ride back to Flagstaff.

Two of the Navajos were killed and one other was wounded. Deputy Hogan received a "long gash" across his shoulders as he was bending over to take cover and Roden received a shot to the groin. Montgomery was dead and Durham escaped with the other survivors unharmed.

== Aftermath ==
News of the shooting quickly spread throughout Arizona and the rest of the nation, but it took nearly a month before the federal government responded. During that time, both the Navajo and the Americans feared that the other side would launch a campaign of reprisal. As result, Flagstaff was fortified by the town militia.

Eventually, the hunters who were involved in the fight were told to report to Flagstaff for a hearing in court, which they refused to do at first. Instead, Chief B'ugoettin assembled 300 heavily armed warriors and led them to Flagstaff. His plan was to conceal his force in the woods outside of town and then go in unarmed with two men to return the posse's horses, attacking only if they were placed in jail. Fortunately, however, Reverend William R. Johnston helped defuse the situation and he promised B'ugoettin that the three hunters would receive an adequate defense if they surrendered now. B'ugoettin agreed so the attack on Flagstaff never came.

The trial was held in the Coconino County Courthouse in September 1900, during which, the wounded Navajo hunter, Haastiin Biwoo Adin, impressed Judge Richard E. Sloan with his address so much so that he found all three of the hunters innocent. Reverend Johnston's nine-year-old son, Philip, translated the Navajo's speech for the court.

After the trial, a Navajo delegation was sent to Washington, D. C. to petition the government for the creation of the Leupp Extension. Ultimately, the delegation was successful in convincing President Theodore Roosevelt, who issued his executive order on November 14, 1901. The Leupp Extension was named after Roosevelt's commissioner of Indian affairs, Francis E. Leupp, and it led to the founding of the town Leupp. Also, B'ugoettin rewarded Reverend Johnston by permitting him to build a mission at Tolchaco, which was located about seven miles south of Leupp.
