= Smoke signal (disambiguation) =

Smoke signals are a form of visual communication used over long distances.

Smoke Signal(s) may also refer to:

== Film and TV ==
- Smoke Signal (film), a 1955 American film
- "Smoke Signals", an episode of 2022 TV series American Horror Story: NYC
- "Smoke Signals" (Dexter: New Blood), a 2021 episode of the TV series Dexter: New Blood
- Smoke Signals (film), a 1998 Canadian-American film
- "Smoke Signals" (American Horror Story), an episode of the eleventh season of American Horror Story

== Music ==
- Smoke Signals (Smokey Robinson album), 1986
- Smoke Signals (MDC album), 1986
- Smoke Signals (song), a 1956 song by Slim Whitman
- "Smoke Signals", a song by Extreme on the 1989 album Extreme
- "Smoke Signals", a song by Phoebe Bridgers on the 2017 album Stranger in the Alps
- "Smoke Signals", a song by Sean Kingston on the 2013 album Back 2 Life

== Publications ==
- Smoke Signal (newsletter), 1975 publication produced by Bill Rosser and others on Palm Island, Australia
- Smoke Signals (journal), the official magazine of the Aborigines Advancement League in Victoria, Australia
- Smoke Signals (newspaper), published by the Confederated Tribes of Grand Ronde, Oregon, U.S.

== Other uses ==
- Smoke Signal, Arizona, a community in the United States
- Smoke Signal Broadcasting, a defunct American computer company
