= Geraldine Keams =

Navajo actor from Arizona (born 1951)

- Born: August 19, 1951 (age 74); Flagstaff, Arizona, U.S.
- Citizenship: Navajo Nation and U.S.
- Occupation: actor
- Years active: 1976–present

Geraldine Keams (born August 19, 1951) is a Navajo actress. She is best known for her work in numerous television series, often playing a maternal role.

== Biography ==
Keams was born on August 19, 1951, in Flagstaff, Arizona. She was raised on the Navajo reservation then went to the University of Arizona, where she studied drama and film.

After graduating from college, Keams moved to New York City to pursue theater. In New York, she wrote and performed with Hanay Geiogamah's (Kiowa/Delaware) Native American Theater Ensemble at La MaMa Experimental Theatre Club. She adapted a Navajo creation story for the 1972 production Na Haaz Zan and also performed in Geiogamah's Body Indian. The ensemble took both pieces on tour in 1972 and 1973, performing at the University of New Mexico, the College of Santa Fe, Haskell Indian Junior College, the Walker Art Center, the American Indian Center in Chicago, the Smithsonian Institution, Rough Rock Demonstration School in Chinle, Arizona, Springfield College, the University of Massachusetts Amherst, the University of Michigan, the University of Wisconsin - Milwaukee, Dartmouth College, and the University at Buffalo, among other places. In 1976, she also directed the show Flight of the Army Worm, which performed at the Navajo Nation Health Symposium.

Keams made her film debut playing Little Moonlight in Clint Eastwood's western The Outlaw Josey Wales (1976).

In 2021, she had a recurring role in the Peacock sitcom Rutherford Falls, about relationships between a fictional Native American tribe and the New England town it borders. Showrunner Sierra Teller Ornelas described Keams as "Navajo royalty", saying, "When she walked on the set, I was starstruck".

In addition to her film work, Keams gives live performances and workshops. She is a resident artist at the Los Angeles Music Center. Keams currently resides in Pasadena, California.

== Filmography ==
Year	Title	Role	Notes
1976	The Outlaw Josey Wales	Little Moonlight	film
1977	The Car	Donna	film
1982	Born to the Wind	Wind Woman	television series
1991	Twin Peaks	Irene Littlehorse	television series
1991	Northern Exposure	Great Aunt	television series
1993	Shadowhunter	Doctor	TV movie
1996	The Secret of Lizard Woman	Lizard Woman	television series
2001	Dharma & Greg	Meditation Leader	television series
2002	The Slaughter Rule	Gretchen Two Dogs	film
2002	Angels Don't Sleep Here	Arlene Grey Eagle	film
2002	Skinwalkers	Gina	TV movie
2003	DreamKeeper	Iktome's Wife	TV movie
2003	Edge of America	Mother Tsosie	TV movie
2003	Scrambled	Dora	film
2005	A Thousand Roads		short film
2005	Buffalo Dreams	Abuela Rose	TV movie
2008	Comanche Moon	Hema	mini-series
2010	Pickin' and Grinnin'	Hopi Woman	film
2010	Faster	Preacher's Wife	film
2012	Arcadia	Security Guard	film
2021	Rutherford Falls	Rayanne	television series
2021	Reservation Dogs	Mabel	television series
