= Philip Johnston (code talker) =

American civil engineer and code talker

- Born: September 14, 1892; Topeka, Kansas, U.S.
- Died: September 11, 1978 (aged 85); San Diego, California, U.S.
- Resting place: Glendale, California, U.S.
- Education: University of Southern California

Philip Johnston (September 14, 1892, in Topeka, Kansas – September 11, 1978, in San Diego, California) was an American civil engineer who is credited with proposing the idea of using the Navajo language as a Navajo code to be used in the Pacific Theater during World War II.

== Early years ==
Johnston was born in Topeka, Kansas, on September 14, 1892, the son of a missionary, William Johnston. The elder Johnston brought his family to Flagstaff, Arizona, on September 16, 1896, to serve Navajos residing on the western part of the Navajo Reservation. Philip's father was able to intervene and defuse a potentially violent clash known as the Padre Canyon Incident, which revealed underlying tensions between Navajos and Anglos involving livestock rustling. For resolving that incident in a peaceful manner, local Navajo leaders allowed Reverend Johnston to build a mission 12 miles north of Leupp, Arizona. After that incident, Philip's father worked to expand the boundaries of the western part of the Navajo reservation in order to resolve livestock rustling disputes on which developing tensions were generally centered.

On the reservation, young Philip learned to speak Navajo while playing with Navajo children. In 1901, Philip traveled to Washington, D.C., with his father and local Navajo leaders when they spoke to the newly appointed President Theodore Roosevelt to persuade him to add more land to the Navajo Reservation via an Executive Order. Philip was the Navajo/English translator between the local Navajo leaders and President Roosevelt.

Around 1909–10, Johnston attended the Northern Arizona Normal School, now Northern Arizona University, where he earned an academic degree. In March 1918 he enlisted in the U.S. Army's 319th Engineers, where he received a reserve commission. Between March and September 1918 he trained in Camp Fremont at Menlo Park, California, before being shipped to France as part of the AEF to participate in World War I. It is here that he may have heard about Comanches being used as code talkers by U.S. Army units.

Johnston attended the University of Southern California, Los Angeles, where he earned his graduate civil engineering degree in 1925. Afterwards he took a job with the city of Los Angeles water department.

== The Navajo code talkers project ==
Though he worked in Los Angeles he maintained his social connections with the Navajo people with whom he grew up. He was working as a civilian in Los Angeles when the Imperial Japanese Navy attacked Pearl Harbor. After the attack he had read of the U.S. Army using Comanches in their Louisiana field maneuvers to transmit military communications and began to think that the Navajo language could also be applied in this manner. He presented this idea to the United States Marine Corps (USMC), and he was directed to present his proposal.

Johnston recruited four Navajos who were working in the Los Angeles shipyards, and arranged to demonstrate the utility of using the Navajo language to transmit military communications. The officer in charge of this demonstration was Communications Officer, Amphibious Force, Fleet Marine Force (FMF) Major James E. Jones, USMC at Camp Elliot, San Diego and Commanding Officer; Amphibious Force, Pacific Fleet General Clayton Barney Vogel heard of the event and attended the demonstration. Initially Philip thought the Navajo language could be used unmodified to transmit military communications, using conversational Navajo. Just before the actual demonstration started, the Navajos received their samples of common military expressions they were to convey to each other. They informed the gathered personnel that in order to send the military messages they would have to use word and letter substitution methods to convey the messages, due to the lack of direct equivalents in Navajo of many technical English terms. After some deliberation to agree upon which Navajo words would represent English equivalents, the Navajos were divided into two groups and put into separate rooms, where field phones had been installed, at opposite ends of the same building.

At that point they transmitted the common military expressions they were assigned to be coded into Navajo and decoded into English, by verbally encrypting, transmitting and decoding the messages nearly verbatim from English, to Navajo and back into English. Philip indicated that this Camp Elliot exercise revealed limitations to using conversational Navajo for military communications and that he was inspired to use the letter and word substitution methods to encrypt Navajo. On the other hand, USMC documents indicate that it was after this demonstration, when they were independently investigating the logistics of using the Navajo language as a code, that it was Bureau of Indian Affairs personnel who stated that a coding system for Navajo had to be created.

General Vogel was so impressed with the Camp Elliot demonstration that he asked the commandant of the Marine Corps to recruit 200 Navajos. But Vogel was given authorization to recruit only 30 Navajos, under a pilot program status to investigate the feasibility of this proposed program with actual Navajos. On the morning of May 4, 1942, 29 Navajo recruits boarded the bus at Ft. Defiance, Arizona, were transported to the induction center at Ft. Wingate, New Mexico, and, after lunch, were transported overnight to Marine Corps Recruit Depot, San Diego (MCRD, SD) for administrative in-processing, then to start their seven weeks of standard recruit training. Upon completion of recruit training the first all-Navajo Platoon 382 graduated from MCRD, SD on June 27, 1942, where they were immediately ordered to report to Camp Elliot for about eight weeks of basic communications training and to develop a code based on the Navajo language. As for developing the code, the Navajos were guided by a cryptographic officer under the command of now Lieutenant Colonel Jones in the basics of employing letter and word substitution encryption methods in the formulation of the code. Shortly after the beginning of this project three additional Navajo Marines were added to the program, and together the 32 Navajos worked to develop the code. Their stay in Camp Elliot ended in the latter half of August 1942.

Based upon the successful training of the pilot talker program on August 25, 1942, the authorization to fulfill the recruitment of 200 Navajos commenced and Marine units "were asked to submit recommendations relative to the number of Navajos they could usefully employ".

After training, one group of 50 were assigned to the 1st Marine Division, a second group of 16 were assigned to the 6th Marines and the 2nd Signal Company of the 2nd Marine Division. Three individuals were retained stateside to recruit and train Navajos to become code talkers. The first group of Navajo code talkers arrived at Guadalcanal on September 18, 1942, near Lunga Point. The second group arrived with the 6th Marines on January 4, 1943, and relieved the 1st Marine Division code talkers and then participated in the latter stages of the Battle of Guadalcanal.

After the USMC officially instituted the "talker" program, Johnston asked the USMC for a special dispensation to serve in the Navajo Code Talking Program as a staff sergeant. His request was granted on September 22, 1942, and he served as a school administrator for the "confidential" program. By October 26, 1942, Staff Sergeant Philip Johnston USMCR and Corporal John A. Benally USMC, one of the three stateside code talkers, were sent out to recruit more Navajos to join the program. From late October through November 1942, they recruited Navajos throughout the western portion of the reservation, until they were recalled back to Camp Elliot. On December 7, 1942, the Navajo Communication School at Camp Elliot began formal lessons under Johnston's supervision. Navajo recruits trickled in and went through standard Marine Corps boot camp, whereupon after graduation they were sent to Camp Elliot. The next all-Navajo platoon to go through boot camp was Platoon 297 in March 1943 at MCRD, SD.

Johnston may have proposed the idea of using the Navajo language to encrypt USMC tactical communications, but he was not yet on active duty with the USMC to be present during its creation by the first 29 + 3 Navajos who created the vocabulary with guidance by a USMC cryptographic officer.

== Later years ==
Philip Johnston died on September 11, 1978, just 3 days shy of his 86th birthday, at the VA Hospital in San Diego, California. He is buried in Glendale, California.

== See also ==
- Navajo Nation
- Navajo
- Code talker
- Code-talker paradox

== Sources ==
- Johnston, Bernice E. (1972). Two Ways in the Desert: A Study of Modern Navajo-Anglo Relations. Catalina Stations, California: Socio-Technical Publications.
- McClain, Sally (2001). Navajo Weapon: The Navajo Code Talkers. Tucson, Arizona: Rio Nuevo Publishers. p. 300. ISBN 978-1-887896-32-0.
- Rottman, Gordon L. (November 30, 2001). U.S. Marine Corps World War II Order of Battle: Ground and Air Units in the Pacific War, 1939–1945. Westport, Conn: Greenwood Press. p. 608. ISBN 978-0-313-31906-8.
