= Conrad House =

Navajo and Oneida artist (1956–2001)

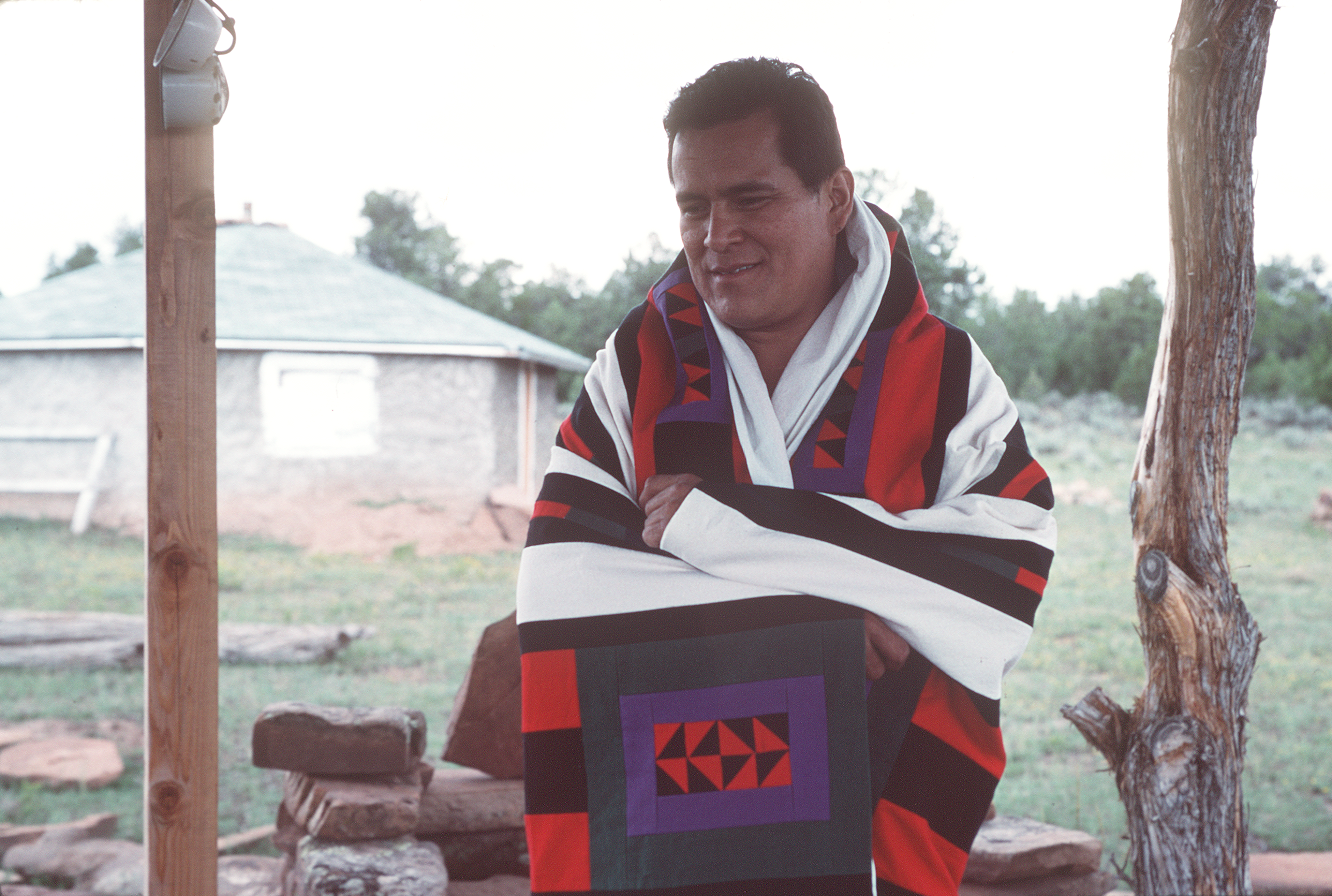
House with a blanket he made

Conrad Glenn House (November 1956 – January 2001), was a multimedia artist of Navajo (Diné) and Oneida ancestry. House's work was significant in redefining Indian art, utilizing many art mediums to preserve symbols and images of his culture and world cultures. His works are in the collection of the Smithsonian's National Museum of the American Indian, Portland Art Museum, Wheelwright Museum, Heard Museum, Navajo Nation Museum and numerous museums and galleries around the world.

== Conrad House Award ==
In 2002, the Heard Museum Guild created the "Conrad House Award for the Most Innovative Artist". Winners of the Conrad House Award include Marilou Schultz, Travis Emerson, D. Y. Begay, Polly Rose Folwell, Barbara Teller Ornelas, Marvin Oliver, Pat Pruitt, Jason Garcia, Warren Coriz, Melissa S. Cody, Orlando Dugi, Ryan Lee Smith, Susan L. Folwell, Berdine Begay, Shan Goshorn, ShoSho Esquiro, and Marlowe Katoney.
