= Jana Schmieding =

American comedian, actor, podcaster, and writer

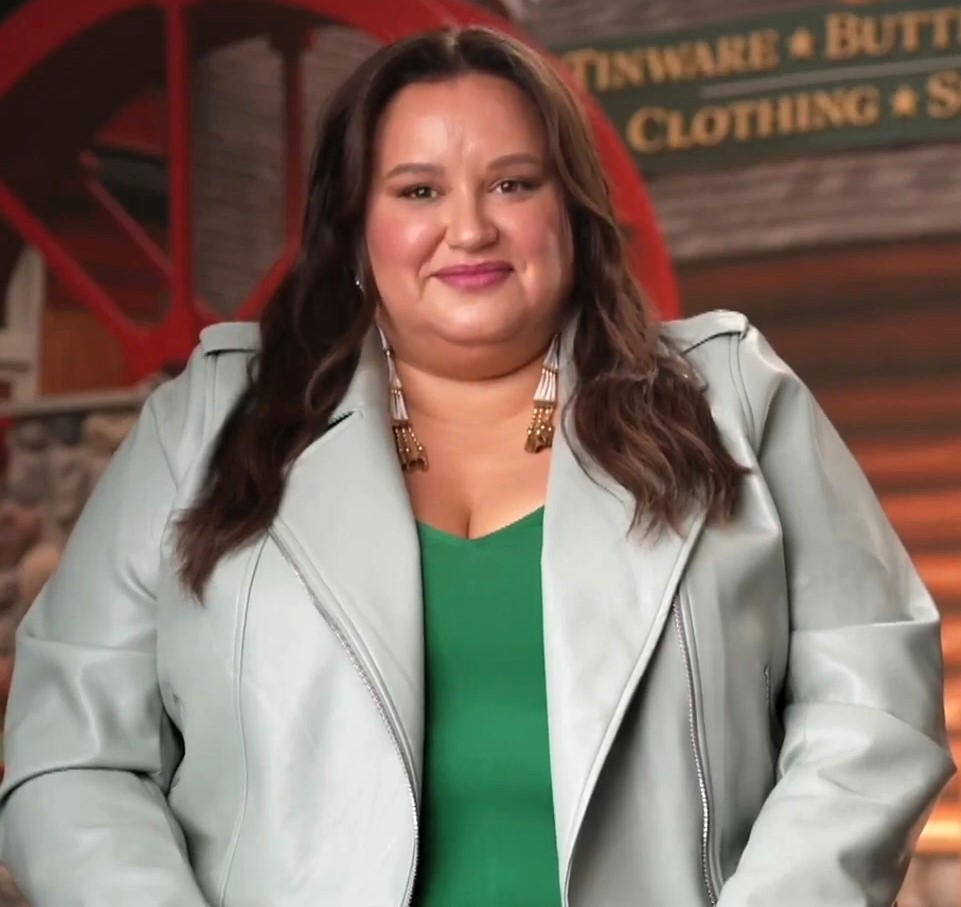
- Schmieding in 2022
- Occupations: Comedian, actor, podcaster, writer
- Years active: 2017–present
- Notable work: Rutherford Falls, Reservation Dogs

Jana Schmieding (Lakota: Wačhí Wašté Wíŋ) is a Native American (Cheyenne River Lakota) comedian, actor, podcaster, and writer. She is best known for her roles hosting the podcast Woman of Size, and as a writer and actor on the sitcom Rutherford Falls, and an actor on Reservation Dogs.

== Early life ==
Schmieding is a Lakota woman who grew up in Canby, Oregon, where she says she was raised "pretty traditionally in the Lakota ways."

Schmieding grew up in Canby, Oregon, which had a primarily white population. As a result, she faced discrimination throughout her childhood. She states that she often educated her teachers about native culture more than they taught her. She credits her mother for her strong will and willingness to stand up for herself and her people.

As a child, Schmieding loved comedy. She shared that when she was a child she would invite her friends over and they would make silly, comedic videos on camcorders. She also enjoyed sketching comedic drawings from a young age.

=== Native background ===
Schmieding is a Lakota woman. Her people are from Cheyenne River in the plains.

The Cheyenne River Sioux Tribe is made up of four of the traditional seven bands of the Lakota Nation. The four bands included are the Plants by the Water or Mnicoujou, Sans Arc or Itazipco, Black Foot or Sihasapa, and Two Kettles or Oohenumpa. The reservation is the fourth largest Indian Reservation in the United States, at 1.4 million acres.

== College ==
Schmieding graduated from the University of Oregon in 2005 with a degree in theater arts. During her time in college, Schmieding participated and was a leader in many student organizations. She was the co-director of the Multicultural Center and was a member of the Native American Student Union. During this time she has stated that many of her duties involved collaborating with many different ethnic, cultural, and student unions. She also planned events and became an activist. Schmieding credits her time at the University of Oregon for discovering her love for activism in collaboration with people of color on a public scale.

Schmieding also participated in theater events throughout her time at the university. She performed in the musical Chicago. She also performed in the play Wild Nights, where she played the role of lesbian Emily Dickinson.

== Career ==
=== Post-college ===
After college, Schmieding moved to New York City to pursue her acting dreams. To earn a living, she spent ten years teaching middle and high school, while performing improv in the evenings with Magnet Theater.

In 2016, Schmieding moved to Los Angeles, where she worked at an education-related nonprofit and shifted gears from acting to writing. Between 2017 and 2019, Schmieding hosted "Woman of Size," a podcast in which she and guests discussed experiences of discrimination related to body size.

=== Rutherford Falls ===
After three years of working on her writing, Schmieding was hired as one of 12 writers on Rutherford Falls, a Peacock original sitcom. The show focuses on relationships between characters in a Northeastern town and the Indian reservation it borders. She was hired by the show's co-creator, Sierra Teller Ornelas (Navajo Nation), who had previously been a guest on Schmieding's podcast. On August 10, 2020, it was announced that Schmeiding would co-star in the show opposite Ed Helms in addition to serving as a writer. She has praised the show for featuring a modern Native woman rather than those confined to the Old West.

Rutherford Falls launched with its entire first season available on demand on April 22, 2021. Early reviews praised Schmieding's performance on screen. Writing for The A.V. Club, Saloni Gajjar called Schmieding a "breakout performer," saying that "comedy vet [Ed] Helms...meets his match in co-star and relative newcomer Schmieding, who balances his rigor with a down-to-earth and equally captivating performance." Jen Chaney of Vulture also named Schmieding the show's "breakout star," calling her "a natural." In July 2021, the series was renewed for a second season, with Schmieding continuing as both a writer and co-star. The season premiered on June 16, 2022.

Schmieding's role in the series models how she continues to stand true to her roots and educates the world about native culture. The themes conveyed throughout the show, such as American history, race, equality, and social justice. Schmieding and series creator Sierra Teller Ornelas have worked together to bring these issues to the forefront in Hollywood and continue to showcase Indigenous actors, culture, and advocacy through the media.

Rutherford Falls was Schmieding's first professional writing job. Her experiences writing with other Native people shaped the way she perceives writing and created bonds between her and other Natives with shared experiences and backgrounds.

=== Aunty Chuck ===
Aunty Chuck is a passion project of Schmieding's that is based loosely on the American comedy Uncle Buck. One of Schmieding's passions is to bring Native actors and culture into the comedy scene as well as bring comedy to Native audiences. This was one of the first film productions that Schmieding had written. She crafted it and had it sponsored and reviewed by Sundance Native Labs, where it was well-received.

=== Other work ===
Schmieding appears as Bev, the clinic receptionist and one of the "aunties," in the series Reservation Dogs.

She also co-hosts the Sage-Based Wisdom podcast with comedian Brian Bahe, who is Navajo, Tohono Oʼodham, and Hopi. As of December 14, 2025, there have been 64 episodes of the podcast aired since its premiere episode was published on August 20, 2024.

== Filmography ==
=== Film ===
Year	Title	Role	Notes
2015	I Love War		Video short
2016	Abortion Party	Michelle	Short film
2017	Blast	Diva	Television miniseries
2018	New Growth		Short film
2019	Rom-Commentary	Jana	Video short
2025	Dog Man	Janet	Voice
2026	Smudge the Blades	Chanelle Okimâw	

=== Television ===
Year	Title	Role	Notes
2016	Broad City	Camp Counselor	Episode: "Game Over"
2021–22	Rutherford Falls	Reagan Wells	Main role, also writer
2021–25	The Great North	Zelda, Loud Sandy	Zelda, Loud Sandy
2021–23	Reservation Dogs	Bev, Clinic Receptionist	9 episodes
2023	Spirit Rangers	Vulture, Detzy, Mom Goose, Ruby, Nanuq	Voice, 3 episodes
2023–24	Clone High	Sacagawea	
2024	Echo	Nita	Episode: "Lowak"
2025	Bob's Burgers	Roxy	Episode: "Get Her to the Zeke"
