= Barbara Teller Ornelas =

Navajo weaver, instructor, author (b. 1954)

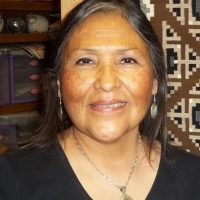
- Born: November 26, 1954 (age 71)
- Education: Arizona State University
- Occupation: Textile artist
- Children: Sierra Teller Ornelas, Michael Teller Ornelas
- Parent(s): Sam Teller and Ruth Teller

Barbara Teller Ornelas (born November 26, 1954) is an American weaver and citizen of the Navajo Nation. She also is an instructor and author about this art. She has served overseas as a cultural ambassador for the U.S. State Department. A fifth-generation Navajo weaver, she exhibits her fine art textiles and educates about Navajo culture at home and abroad.

== Background ==
Ornelas is Tabaaha clan (Edgewater) and born for To-heedliinii clan (Two Water Flows Together). She grew up at Two Grey Hills Trading Post in Tohatchi, New Mexico, before later moving to Arizona. Learning from her mother, grandmothers, and older sister, she is a fifth-generation Navajo weaver.

== Art process ==
She weaves tapestries with sheep wool from local flocks raised by Navajo families. She weaves textiles with high weft-counts, including some that are from 102 to 140 wefts.

== Art exhibitions ==
Her work has been featured at the Heard Museum, Arizona State Museum, Denver Art Museum, the Smithsonian Institution National Museum of the American Indian, and the British Museum of Mankind in London, among other museums.

== Documentary ==
Her daughter Sierra Teller Ornelas was commissioned by the Arizona State Museum to make a documentary film, A Loom with a View: Modern Navajo Weavers, which explores the weaving of her family members, including Barbara herself, Barbara's son Michael Teller Ornelas, and Sierra's great aunt Margaret Yazzie.

== Awards ==
- The Conrad House Award, Heard Museum Guild Fair and Market
- Best of Show (2 times) at the Santa Fe Indian Market

== Cultural ambassador ==
Ornelas has traveled extensively as a cultural ambassador for the U.S. State Department. She has been a part of cultural programs in Uzbekistan, Kyrgyzstan, and Peru.

== Books ==
She co-authored the following books with her sister Lynda Teller Pete:

- Spider Woman's Children: Navajo Weavers Today (2018) Thrums Books ISBN 978-0-99905-175-7
- How To Weave a Navajo Rug and Other Lessons from Spider Woman (2020), Thrums Books ISBN 978-1-73442-170-5

== Personal life ==
Her adult children Sierra Teller Ornelas and Michael Teller Ornelas are sixth-generation Navajo weavers.

== See also ==
- Craft in America
- Daisy Taugelchee
