= Tselakai Dezza, Utah =

Tselakai Dezza, Utah Tséłgaii Deezʼáhí (Navajo)
- CDP
- Location in San Juan County and the state of Utah.
- Coordinates: 37°12′40″N 109°35′20″W
- Country: United States
- State: Utah
- County: San Juan

Area
  - Total: 19.8 sq mi (51.2 km^{2})
  - Land: 19.8 sq mi (51.2 km^{2})
  - Water: 0 sq mi (0.0 km^{2})
- Elevation: 4,580 ft (1,396 m)

Population (2020)
  - Total: 95
  - Density: 4.8/sq mi (1.9/km^{2})
- Time zone: UTC-7 (Mountain (MST))
  - Summer (DST): UTC-6 (MDT)
- FIPS code: 49-77697
- GNIS feature ID: 1852449

Tselakai Dezza is a census-designated place (CDP) in San Juan County, Utah, United States. The population was 95 at the 2020 census.

== Geography ==
Tselakai Dezza is located at 37°12′40″N 109°35′20″W (37.211198, -109.588759).

According to the United States Census Bureau, the CDP has a total area of 19.8 square miles (51.2 km^{2}), all land.

== Demographics ==
Languages (2000)	Percent
Spoke Navajo at home	100%

As of the census of 2000, there were 103 people, 28 households, and 25 families residing in the CDP. The population density was 5.2 people per square mile (2.0/km^{2}). There were 38 housing units at an average density of 1.9/sq mi (0.7/km^{2}). The racial makeup of the CDP was 99.03% Native American and 0.97% White.

There were 28 households, out of which 35.7% had children under the age of 18 living with them, 64.3% were married couples living together, 21.4% had a female householder with no husband present, and 10.7% were non-families. 10.7% of all households were made up of individuals, and 7.1% had someone living alone who was 65 years of age or older. The average household size was 3.68 and the average family size was 3.92.

In the CDP, the population was spread out, with 30.1% under the age of 18, 15.5% from 18 to 24, 24.3% from 25 to 44, 23.3% from 45 to 64, and 6.8% who were 65 years of age or older. The median age was 26 years. For every 100 females, there were 90.7 males. For every 100 females age 18 and over, there were 84.6 males.

The median income for a household in the CDP was $47,250, and the median income for a family was $47,250. Males had a median income of $100,000 versus $5,000 for females. The per capita income for the CDP was $19,021. None of the population or families were below the poverty line.

== See also ==
- List of census-designated places in Utah
- List of communities on the Navajo Nation
