= Rutherford Falls =

American television sitcom

- Promotional poster
- Genre: Sitcom
- Created by: Ed Helms; Michael Schur; Sierra Teller Ornelas
- Starring: Ed Helms; Michael Greyeyes; Jana Schmieding; Jesse Leigh; Dustin Milligan
- Theme music composer: Lucy Schwartz; David Schwartz; The Halluci Nation
- Composers: David Schwartz; The Halluci Nation
- Country of origin: United States
- Original language: English
- No. of seasons: 2
- No. of episodes: 18

Production
- Executive producers: Mike Falbo; Ed Helms; David Miner; Morgan Sackett; Michael Schur; Sierra Teller Ornelas
- Production companies: Universal Television; 3 Arts Entertainment; Fremulon; Pacific Electric Picture Company; Booth Fee

Original release
- Network: Peacock
- Release: April 22, 2021 – June 16, 2022

Rutherford Falls is an American sitcom television series that premiered on the streaming service Peacock on April 22, 2021. It was created by Ed Helms, Michael Schur, and Sierra Teller Ornelas. In July 2021, the series was renewed for a second season, which was released on June 16, 2022.

In September 2022, the series was canceled after two seasons.

== Premise ==
The series is a comedy about two lifelong friends and fellow museum curators, Nathan Rutherford (Ed Helms) and Reagan Wells (Jana Schmieding), whose relationship is tested when a crisis hits their fictional small town. After the mayor decides to move a statue of Nathan's ancestor (the town founder) because drivers keep hitting it, Nathan embarks on a quixotic campaign to keep the statue in place.

Reagan has to juggle loyalty to her friend and to her people, the Minishonka Nation. She wants to develop a cultural center to highlight their history, and Nathan's ancestor is notorious for having driven her people from their ancestral land centuries earlier.

Terry Thomas (Michael Greyeyes) is the CEO of the casino that provides most of the Minishonka Nation's finances; a natural-born schemer, he seeks to use Reagan and others as pawns in his desire to gain more political and financial power for his tribe.

The show uses humor, jokes, and irony to highlight the biases that are present in today's society surrounding Native Americans. The show uses a marginalized community and a white community to compare and contrast society's view on their heritage and preservation throughout its entirety. While hard-hitting topics are presented throughout the show, an overarching sense of comedy, irony, and light-heartedness is evident from the beginning.

== Cast ==
=== Main ===
- Ed Helms as Nathan Rutherford, who runs the town's heritage museum and is a descendant of the town's founder
- Jana Schmieding (Cheyenne River Sioux) as Reagan Wells, Nathan's best friend and a Minishonka, who dreams of championing the history of her people
- Michael Greyeyes (Muskeg Lake Cree Nation) as Terry Thomas, the C.E.O. of the Minishonka casino, who envisions big things for both Reagan Wells and their Nation
- Jesse Leigh as Bobbie Yang, an ambitious high school student who works as Nathan's personal assistant
- Dustin Milligan as Josh Carter, an NPR journalist seeking to reveal the real story of Rutherford Falls

=== Recurring ===
- Dana L. Wilson as Deirdre Chisenhall, Mayor of Rutherford Falls
- Bobby Wilson (Sisseton Wahpeton Dakota) as Wayne, a casino employee
- Beth Stelling as Peggy Fish, a teacher with a crush on Nathan
- Geraldine Keams (Diné) as Rayanne
- Ben Koldyke as Dudley 'Duz' Rutherford, Nathan's brother
- Migizi Pensoneau (Ponca/Ojibwe) as Roy Crooks, CEO of Spirit Pond Resort, Casino, Indoor Water Park, and Dispensary
- Adam Farabee as Charlie Cromwell
- Mimi Gianopulos as Kaitlyn, Vice President of Communications at Rutherford Inc.
- Jason Grasl as Forest Grant
- Chevonne Hughes as Bonnie
- Devery Jacobs (Kahnawake Mohawk) as Jess Wells, Reagan's cousin and Terry's assistant
- Julia Jones as Sally, a casino employee
- Monica Padman as Melanie, Kaitlyn's assistant
- Camille Schurer as Madison
- Paul F. Tompkins as Professor Tobias James Kaufman
- Kiawentiio (Mohawk) as Maya Thomas, Terry's daughter
- Martin Sensmeier (Alaska Native) as Ray, Reagan's ex-fiancée
- Kaniehtiio Horn (Kahnawake Mohawk) as Feather Day, mayoral candidate (season 2)
- Dallas Goldtooth (Mdewakanton Dakota/Diné) as Nelson, newly hired museum curator and Reagan's new love interest (season 2)

== Episodes ==
=== Series overview ===
Series overview for Rutherford Falls
Season	Episodes	Originally released
1	10	April 22, 2021
2	8	June 16, 2022

=== Season 1 (2021) ===
Rutherford Falls, season one episodes
No. overall	No. in season	Title	Directed by	Written by	Original release date
1	1	"Pilot"	Lawrence Sher	Ed Helms & Michael Schur & Sierra Teller Ornelas	April 22, 2021
After yet another car runs into the statue of Lawrence “Big Larry” Rutherford in the middle of an intersection, Mayor Chisenhall decides it’s time to remove the statue. Nathan is irate at having the statue of his ancestor removed. His childhood best friend Reagan is on his side at first, but she later convinces him to move the statue to the town history museum he runs. However, at a town gathering where he plans to announce the move, as the crowd heckles him and questions the importance of Big Larry, he goes on an angry rant against the town and says he’ll fight to keep the statue in its place after all. Meanwhile, Reagan goes before her boss Terry, who runs the casino, to ask that more casino profits go into expanding the Minishonka cultural center she runs. He refuses her request but tells her he’s preparing for a secret initiative called “Running Lightning” and would like her to be a part of it in 3-5 years. After Terry sees Nathan’s angry speech to the town, Terry tells his board it’s time to launch Running Lightning immediately.
2	2	"Buckheart Lodge"	Lawrence Sher	Sierra Teller Ornelas	April 22, 2021
Nathan and his assistant Bobby visit Nathan’s old history professor, Tobias Kaufman, who’s writing a book about the Rutherfords, to see if he can help get people on Nathan’s side about the statue. They record an interview for Kaufman’s podcast. After Kaufman makes several racist comments, Nathan asks if the episode can be edited, and Kaufman refuses. He releases the episode and an executive at Rutherford Inc., the major multinational corporation Nathan’s family founded, has to scrub it from the Internet to avoid damaging the company’s reputation. Meanwhile, Reagan is having trouble getting support from the community for her cultural center, and Terry explains it’s because she needs to rebuild her relationships with the community after she broke off an engagement years earlier. He brings her on his visits to council members, during which she provides service to the community while Terry uses her to get council members on his side. Terry again asks Reagan to work for his Running Lightning initiative and she refuses. The board is now all in support of Terry, and he announces they are suing Nathan Rutherford.
3	3	"Aunt Ida's 90th Birthday"	Sydney Freeland	Eric Ledgin	April 22, 2021
Nathan leaves town for a family gathering to celebrate Great Aunt Ida’s 90th birthday at his brother Duz’s house, which has been in the family for hundreds of years. He’s devastated to learn Duz is planning to sell the house. Duz tries to convince Nathan to stop idealizing the Rutherfords, while Nathan tries to convince Duz not to sell the house. Meanwhile, Nathan has left Reagan and Bobby in charge of his museum, and Josh, a reporter from New York City, shows up to see if the statue is worth doing a story on. Reagan shows him around and convinces him there’s no story there. Josh misses his train back to New York, so Reagan takes him out for a drink and Josh ends up kissing her and spending the night. In the morning, the two get coffee and Josh tells her New York is only a train ride away. Then, just as he is commenting that he didn’t get a story out of the trip, Nathan shows up, outraged, saying he’s being sued by the Minishonka Nation.
4	4	"Terry Thomas"	Sydney Freeland	Rupinder Gill	April 22, 2021
Josh comes to interview Terry and asks more hard-hitting questions than Terry expected. Nathan shows up, trying to put an end to Terry’s lawsuit by offering Terry fur and popcorn to satisfy the offerings Nathan’s ancestors agreed to make the Minishonka people in exchange for the land they gave up for the town of Rutherford Falls. Terry explains the Minishonka are owed $350 million. Nathan warns that he has a seat on the board of Rutherford Inc., and the company will come after Terry if he pursues the lawsuit. After Nathan leaves, Josh pushes Terry and asks if the capitalism of the casino is at odds with Terry’s cultural values. Terry shuts off Josh’s recorder and explains that power is a zero-sum game, and money is the route to power. He says his goal is to get back everything that was taken from the Minishonka. Terry also attempts to convince his daughter, Maya, to monetize her talent for beadwork, but she rebels against his desire for profit. At the end, Terry convenes the board and shares that Nathan has a seat on the Rutherford Inc. board. Terry announces he wants to add the company to the lawsuit.
5	5	"History Fair"	Lawrence Sher	Lauren Tyler	April 22, 2021
Nathan and Reagan judge a school history fair. After learning the best entry, an impressive video about the Minishonka people, was made by a white student who has worn dreadlocks and mimicked what sounds like Jamaican Patois, they give the award to Bobby, whose video about America is nonsensical and therefore inoffensive. Meanwhile, Mayor Chisenhall and Terry have been butting heads all evening, apparently because the Mayor had rented an airbnb property from Terry and left him a bad review, causing him to lose his Superhost status. Finally, the two realize they are both ambitious and have positions of power obtained by few people in their respective communities, and they agree to be allies. After Terry leaves, the Mayor tells her assistant she still doesn’t trust Terry but asks him to set up a squash game between her and Terry.
6	6	"Negotiations"	Sydney Freeland	Marcos Luevanos	April 22, 2021
Josh shows up at the casino to record audio for his podcast and brings Reagan a latte. After Wayne and Sally make fun of Reagan, she asks what they’re doing for the good of the tribe, so they solicit donations for the cultural center but end up with a pile of what looks like junk. Josh helps Reagan sort through it, and after she calls some of the donors, she realizes some of the items, like blenders and old VHS tapes, have meaningful stories about people’s cultural identity and activism. Terry’s daughter Maya also donates some of her beadwork. Reagan holds a re-opening of the cultural center with the new items. Meanwhile, Rutherford Inc. sends a young lawyer to help Nathan. They meet with Terry, and the lawyer offers him $3 million to drop the lawsuit. Terry counters with $300 million and demands that the company’s real lawyers return by Friday at noon. Later, Nathan and Terry run into each other at a restaurant and are kind to each other despite the lawsuit. On Friday, minutes before Terry’s deadline, a helicopter with the Rutherford Inc. logo lands in the casino parking lot.
7	7	"Rutherford Inc."	Rebecca Asher	Tazbah Chavez	April 22, 2021
An elder woman from the tribe comes to the cultural center and tells Reagan she’s proud of her. Reagan tells Josh it’s the best day of her life. Terry tells the Rutherford Inc. lawyers he will publish a damaging history of the Rutherfords written by Professor Kaufman unless Rutherford Inc. sells back to the tribe some of their land, which includes the land on which Nathan's museum/house sits. If they do, Terry will drop the lawsuit. Nathan and Reagan decide to protect Nathan’s house by having it designated a historical landmark. They go to Nathan's Great Aunt Joan's house to dig through her old records. They find nothing helpful, but Reagan finds a cabinet of Minishonka cultural artifacts. After they leave, Kaitlyn tells Nathan they’re going to take Terry’s deal because the land is unfrackable anyway. Later, Reagan, after encouragement from Josh, tells Nathan she’s going to ask his great-Aunt to return her Minishonka collection. He lashes out and says her people are trying to steal his home. Reagan asks Nathan to help her, but he says he won’t because that would benefit his enemy, Terry. Reagan drives to the casino, where she tells Terry she'll finally agree to work for him in exchange for a larger budget for the cultural center. Meanwhile, Mayor Chisenhall confronts Terry about his plan to buy part of the town, which she’s afraid will jeopardize her re-election. She tells him they’re at war.
8	8	"Skoden"	Sydney Freeland	Bobby Wilson	April 22, 2021
Terry names Reagan the Associate Director of the casino, and they travel to a gaming conference, where they see projections about the imminent decline of gaming revenue and realize they’re unprepared for the future. Meanwhile, Deirdre, the mayor, visits Nathan and explains she wants the town to keep the Big Larry statue in place after all, in the hopes that civic pride will keep the town from signing off on Terry’s land deal. Nathan gives a speech to the city council advocating to leave the statue in place. The council agrees, at least temporarily. Nathan and Deirdre go back to his house to celebrate their victory and end up having sex. The next morning, Nathan notices Minishonka writing on the statue. Rayanne, a Minishonka woman, translates it as a warning not to trust a legendary monster, explaining Big Larry was a real monster to the Minishonka people. Nathan, Deirdre, Reagan, and Terry meet at the casino. Reagan and Terry propose creating “Ye Olde Rutherford Village,” a 17th-Century village similar to Colonial Williamsburg. Reagan thinks Nathan will enjoy the opportunity to showcase his family’s and the town’s history, but Nathan is angry he’s being asked to give up his land but still live on it on Terry’s terms. He refuses the deal and walks out.
9	9	"Stoodis"	Claire Scanlon	Matt Murray & Tai Leclaire	April 22, 2021
Terry gives Reagan $20,000 to buy the Minishonka artifacts from Nathan’s aunt, Joan. Joan agrees to Reagan’s offer only after Reagan threatens to get the feds involved to find out if the items were acquired in compliance with NAGPRA. Reagan and Josh go through artifacts in the carriage house and discover old love letters revealing Nathan isn’t biologically a Rutherford. Josh wants to include this fact in his reporting. Reagan says she can’t be with him if he destroys her best friend’s life. It appears to be the end of their relationship. Meanwhile, Bobby observes that Terry usually gets his way, so suggests Nathan join Terry in planning the historical Rutherford Village so he’ll have a say. Nathan agrees but is frustrated the costumes and symbols Terry proposes are not historically accurate. Then Reagan comes to Nathan’s house and tells him he’s not a Rutherford. Nathan denies it and gets angry. Later, his brother Duz confirms that Mr. D’Angelo from their mom’s bowling team is Nathan’s biological father. Nathan says he’s closing the museum forever and leaving town. He attempts to pull down the Big Larry statue with his car, but his bumper falls off as he drives away.
10	10	"D'Angelos"	Claire Scanlon	Eric Ledgin	April 22, 2021
Nathan drives around America looking for answers around his identity, first from an elderly relative and then from the D'Angelo family. He eventually becomes an "honorary D'Angelo" for completing an eating challenge at a restaurant formerly owned by the family, although he vomits over the table after finishing his food. At Rutherford Falls, Reagan's appointment as manager of the new cultural center proves controversial for her lack of Minishonka language and relationship with Josh. With Bobby and Terry's assistance, she hosts a live video stream and assuages the community's fears by crticising others' shortcomings. Nathan calls Reagan and the two make up, though Nathan chooses to stay on the road for a while. He listens to Josh's podcast, which focuses on his portrayal as a "hapless rube".

=== Season 2 (2022) ===
Rutherford Falls, season two episodes
No. overall	No. in season	Title	Directed by	Written by	Original release date
11	1	"White Man in the Cupboard"	Craig Zisk	Eric Ledgin	June 16, 2022
A few months after the events of the previous season, Josh's podcast about Rutherford Falls has been released. Terry's planned transformation of the town into Ye Olde Rutherford Falls has gone ahead, to the disdain of some local business owners, including ambitious gym owner Feather Day. Reagan is now in charge of the Minishonkans' cultural heritage museum. Unbeknownst to everybody except her, a reticent Nathan has been living in the museum's attic for the last two months, too ashamed to face the town. Nathan reunites with Bobbie, and the two plan to hijack Terry's birthday party, where Nathan plays an embarrassing, white guilt apology video. Deirdre informs Terry that she has been named interim state comptroller, and a special election for mayor will need to be held.
12	2	"The New Curator"	Craig Zisk	Sierra Teller Ornelas	June 16, 2022
Reagan hires the seemingly-perfect, extremely-qualified Native American, Shep as a curator for the museum, but as he gives vague answers about his family and heritage she, Wayne, and Sally begin to suspect he is a pretendian. Nathan encourages Reagan to find out the truth. Following an interrogation by Terry, Shep tearfully admits he is a white man from Connecticut and has been faking his Native heritage. He is fired from the job. Reagan instead hires the prickly Nelson, who is annoying but definitely Native. Meanwhile, Terry tries to convince Nathan to run for mayor to stop Feather Day from winning. After considering it, Nathan declines and suggests Bobbie as a replacement instead.
13	3	"Aunt Sue"	Tazbah Rose Chavez	Rupinder Gill	June 16, 2022
Reagan's Aunt Sue passes away, and her irresponsible brother Curtis arrives back in town for the services. To her dismay, their mother has decided Curtis will inherit Sue's land. Curtis is tasked with ordering flowers; Nathan accompanies him but hides in a coffin to avoid Reagan. The coffin carrying Nathan is used for a funeral, and he is attacked by the deceased's pro football player sons. At a party at the casino, the family speaks fondly of Aunt Sue, and Reagan inherits Sue's motorcycle. Meanwhile, Terry and Bobbie begin face-to-face campaigning for the latter's mayoral campaign. When that proves inefficient, Bobbie convinces him that he has a wider reach with social media videos. Deirdre tells her assistant she is pregnant with Nathan's child. Guests: Lorne Cardinal as Bill Wells, Eddie Spears as Curtis
14	4	"Land Back"	Tazbah Rose Chavez	Tazbah Rose Chavez	June 16, 2022
Nathan visits Deirdre's new office in Albany to get her endorsement for Bobbie, and she asks for his help in auditing a local train museum. They spend the night together; the next day she tells him she is pregnant. She is interested in him and willing to coparent, but finds him too unreliable to be a romantic partner. Meanwhile, Reagan applies for a land assignment and is bounced between several offices. Nelson accompanies her to look at a potential plot of land. Upon being informed that her application might take six months' work of processing as an unmarried woman with no kids, Nelson pretends to be her husband, and she is immediately given an application form. She takes him to where the cultural center is being constructed and the two kiss as the song "Where Is My Mind" plays. Reagan and Nathan encourage each other about their new life developments.
15	5	"Adirondack S3"	Eric Kissack	Matt Murray & Jana Schmieding	June 16, 2022
Terry and Reagan are hired as consultants for the Native subplot of the story within a story, TV Western Adirondack. Terry is hopeful that this collaboration will could bring show business revenue to Rutherford Falls. They object to the depictions of the show's Native Americans, including a culturally appropriated and grossly misrepresented Minishonka ceremony, but their concerns are dismissed by the white showrunners. Reagan meets up with Josh. Nathan and Bobbie also travel to New York in hopes of securing a campaign contribution from Rutherford Inc., only to be informed by Kaitlyn's replacement Melanie that the company is rebranding and severing ties with the town. With Kaitlyn's help, Nathan blackmails Melanie into financially supporting Bobbie. On the set of Adirondack, Terry has given up on the impossible task of getting the show to respect the Minishonka; instead he encourages the show to engage in all the offensive Native American stereotypes they want to, bringing increased negative attention to the production. Reagan reaffirms her relationship with Nelson.
16	6	"Halloween"	Tracey Deer	Lauren Tyler	June 16, 2022
Rutherford Falls celebrates Halloween. To their parents' mutual dismay, Terry's son and Feather Day's daughter are spending Halloween together. The three set out to stop them, only to learn they are trick-or-treating and vandalizing Big Larry's statue. The two families agree not to speak of the event. At Wayne and Sally's Halloween party, Reagan fights other women who are interested in Nelson, who in turn is jealous of her ex-fiance Ray. Following a string of clumsy but well-intentioned gifts, Nathan is introduced to Deirdre's parents, who think he has abandoned her and the baby. Deirdre eventually admits the truth to her parents. Nathan rebuffs her advances, telling her he can't only be interested when she is.
17	7	"Firefighters Pancake Breakfast"	Brennan Shroff	Tai Leclaire	June 16, 2022
Bobbie and Feather attend a pancake breakfast for the fire department, the final event on the campaign trail before the mayoral debate. At the breakfast, Nathan befriends Nelson. Terry secures a corporate sponsor for the cultural center, which upsets Reagan until he tells her the Ye Olde Rutherford plan is only making 40% of its projected income. The two take cannabis-containing gummies to relieve stress. As they come down from the high, Terry gets the idea to start a cannabis business. Bobbie wins the firefighters over by promising to update their building. After he is overheard making fun of a firefighter, Nathan is goaded by Feather into completing an obstacle course that ends with jumping through a flaming door onto another platform. He succeeds. Reagan convinces Terry to ask Roy, a wealthy, arrogant casino owner from another tribe, for funding.
18	8	"Election"	Tracey Deer	Dash Turner & Kate Frydman	June 16, 2022
Terry, fresh off the opening of his cannabis business, and Nathan prepare Bobbie up for the mayoral debate. Deirdre asks Nathan to convince Peggy/Ms. Fish to be Deirdre's doula while Reagan's land application is approved. At the debate, Feather accuses Bobbie of being Terry's shadow candidate, which Bobbie deflects by revealing the vandalism committed by Terry's and Feather's children; this angers Terry. Sally asks for Reagan's help in applying for land, which inspires Reagan to decide she's going to use her land to create a communal living space for singles. Nelson seems disappointed in this change in their plans, and refers to it as "their" land, but goes with it. Bobbie is elected as mayor and Josh arrives in Rutherford Falls to profile them, promising to see Reagan around. Intrigued by Peggy's confidence, Nathan sleeps with her, just as Deirdre expresses interest in a serious relationship with him.

== Production ==
=== Development ===
“[T]here’s very specific ways that Native people relate to the towns around them and they’re fraught. It’s complicated and complex and it involves commerce and culture. Part of the project of this show is to get really detailed and explain to people who don’t know anything how these relationships exist between towns and their neighbouring reservations. It’s very important for us to get very specific and explain how that stuff works.”

— Michael Schur, 2020

The series was created by Ed Helms, Michael Schur, and Sierra Teller Ornelas. The initial idea came from discussions between Helms and Schur (who had previously worked together on The Office), and once they had decided on a Native American theme, they asked Ornelas to get involved and serve as showrunner. Schur had worked with her previously on Brooklyn Nine-Nine.

After delays due to the COVID-19 pandemic, the series announced in August 2020 their intentions to begin filming in Los Angeles in early September. On July 8, 2021, Peacock renewed the series for a second season.

The writers' room features one of the largest Indigenous writing staffs on American television, with five writers being of Indigenous heritage. Teller Ornelas recruited Native writers from many different sources. The diversity present in the writers room brought multiple perspectives to the table and created a diversified representation of Indigenous people in the show. She hired Bobby Wilson of the 1491s, who also acts in the show, after laughing at a post he made on Instagram. Teller Ornelas said she had previously been told there wasn't enough Native American writing or acting talent to make a Native-themed sitcom, but told The New York Times, "It’s not true. We found more Native writers than we could staff and multiple actors for each role. It was an embarrassment of riches."

On September 2, 2022, Peacock announced that it would not be renewing the show for a third season, effectively cancelling it after two seasons.

=== Casting ===
When the series was announced in November 2019, it was reported that co-creator Ed Helms would be starring in the series. On August 10, 2020, as part of a virtual press tour, the principal cast was announced as Jana Schmieding, Michael Greyeyes, Jesse Leigh, and Dustin Milligan.

== Release ==
On March 16, 2021, the series released its first trailer. On April 22, Peacock released all ten episodes of the series' first season.

== Reception ==
Reviews of the show's first season were generally positive. Rotten Tomatoes gave the series a score of 94% based on 36 critics with an average rating of 7.20/10. The website's critical consensus reads, "Though it takes a few episodes to find its footing, a winsome ensemble, witty writing, and a willingness to engage with complex issues facing Indigenous peoples in modern America make Rutherford Falls a place worth visiting." Metacritic gave the series a score of 66 out of 100 indicating "generally favorable reviews" based on 17 critics.

Based on the first four episodes of the series, Jen Chaney of Vulture said the show "skillfully braids discussions of serious sociocultural issues with character-based comedy in ways that seem neither forced nor overly didactic." Saloni Gajjar of The A.V. Club gave the series a grade of "A−" and said the show "is distinguished by a sincere attempt to depict previously untold narratives without falling into a trap of stereotypes" and praised its "vibrant, heartwarming spirit."

== See also ==
- Removal of Confederate monuments and memorials
