= Melissa Cody =

Native American textile artist (born 1983)

- Born: 1983 (age 42–43); No Water Mesa, Arizona, US
- Education: Institute of American Indian Arts (BA)
- Known for: Textile art, Navajo weaving, Germantown Revival style
- Spouse: Joshua Prince (1976–2015)
- Relatives: Martha Gorman Schultz (grandmother); Marilou Schultz (aunt)

Melissa Cody (born 1983) is a Navajo textile artist, from No Water Mesa, Arizona, United States. Her Germantown Revival style weavings are known for their bold colors and intricate three dimensional patterns. Cody maintains aspects of traditional Navajo tapestries, but also adds her own elements into her work. These elements range from personal tributes to pop culture references.

Her tapestries have been described as "[…] deeply personal, beautifully crafted, powerfully expressive works of art that speak to her culture and generation." She resides in Long Beach, California.

== Early life and education ==
Cody was born in 1983 in No Water Mesa, Arizona. She is a member of the Diné (Navajo) Nation and grew up on a Navajo Reservation in Leupp, Arizona and at times lived in Southern California and Texas. Cody is a fourth generation textile artist who began weaving at the age of 5. She grew up watching her mother Lola Cody, her grandmother Martha Gorman Schultz and other family members work at the loom and was encouraged to challenge and explore her own capabilities on the loom.

Melissa Cody primarily works in the Germantown Revival style of weaving. This style is a traditional Navajo style of weaving that was created during a time of oppression, the Navajo Long Walk, that used wool from government issued wool blankets. Curators Besaw et al. explain that this style is known for its, "vibrant hues, diamond patterns, geometric forms and overlapping lines". Cody weaves on a traditional Navajo loom, which are all built by her father, using Germantown style wool yarn. She is known for incorporating traditional Germantown styles with modern elements in her tapestries. Her works also include Navajo symbols, personal references as well as pop culture references. Cody's tapestries have been credited as giving off a three dimensional illusion.

In 2007, Cody graduated from the Institute of American Indian Arts in Santa Fe, New Mexico and received a B.A. degree in studio arts and museum studies. After college, Cody interned at the Museum of International Folk Art in Santa Fe, NM and at the National museum of the American Indian in Washington D.C.

== Artworks ==
=== Dopamine Regression – 2010 ===
In this 70 x 48 in. textile, Cody uses brightly colored wool that is said to give off a three dimensional look. According to the curators Besaw et al., Cody created this work to honor her father, as he struggles with Parkinson's disease. Besaw et al. further explain that the several black crosses represent her deep sorrow to his condition. The red cross at the top of the tapestry refers to the medical red cross, as well as the Navajo goddess, Spider Woman. This goddess is known for her strength, goodness and for teaching the art of weaving. Overall, this tapestry contains Navajo symbols and personal references.

=== Deep Brain Stimulation – 2011 ===
Deep Brain Stimulation is held in a collection at the Minneapolis Institute of Art and maintains the Germantown Revival style with bright "eye dazzling designs". With dimensions of 40 x 30 in. Cody uses intensely colored wool that creates rainbow like patterns. There are black and white crosses across the piece that symbolize the Navajo goddess, Spider Woman once again. The artwork's title is meant to pay tribute to her father, who has Parkinson's disease, as it refers to a neural treatment for the disease.

=== World Traveler – 2014 ===
World Traveler (2014) at the National Gallery of Art in 2023

A selected work at the Garth Greenman gallery and part of the Stark Museum Navajo Weaving: Tradition and Trade exhibit, World Traveler is a 90x 48 in. wool textile piece. Like the Germantown Revival style of weaving, Cody is said to create an "illusion of movement". According to curators Besaw et al., World Traveler "features a panel with sixteen concentric half-circles decorated with a checkerboard pattern" that gives a "psychedelic effect".

== Exhibitions ==
=== Solo exhibitions ===
- Webbed Skies: Melissa Cody, MoMA PS1, Queens, New York (2024)
- Future Tradition: Melissa Cody, Houston Center for Contemporary Craft, Houston, Texas (2017)

=== Group exhibitions ===
- Warp and Weft: Technologies within Textiles, The Shepherd, Detroit, Michigan (2025)
- Making Their Mark: Works from the Shah Garg Collection, BAMPFA (2024)
- Àbadakone | Continuous Fire | Feu continuel, National Gallery of Canada, Ottawa, Ontario, Canada (2020)
- Threads of Rain, de Young Museum, San Francisco, California (2019)
- NDN NOW, Heard Museum, Phoenix, Arizona (2019)
- Heritage, Rebecca Camacho Presents, San Francisco, California (2019)
- Nine 4 Ninety: Artists for a New Understanding, Museum of Northern Arizona, Flagstaff, Arizona (2019)
- Self, Made, Exploratorium, San Francisco, California (2019)
- Color Riot! How Color Changed Navajo Textiles, Heard Museum, Phoenix, Arizona (2019)
- Interwoven, MASS Gallery, Austin, Texas (2019)
- Casa Tomada, SITE Santa Fe, Santa Fe, New Mexico (2018)
- Footprints Forward: Navajo Contemporary Artists Post-1868, Navajo Nation Museum, Window Rock, Arizona (2018)
- Edgewater Reflections, University of New Mexico Ingham Chapman Gallery, Albuquerque, New Mexico (2018)
- Connective Tissue: New Approaches To Fiber In Contemporary Native Art, Institute of American Indian Arts, Santa Fe, New Mexico (2017)
- Navajo Weaving: Tradition and Trade, Stark Museum of Art, Orange, Texas (2014)
- Messengers 2012, Rainmaker Gallery, Bristol, England (2012)
- A Turning Point: Navajo Weaving In The Late 20th Century, Heard Museum, Phoenix, Arizona (2010)
- Family Ties: Youth Navajo Weavers, Heard Museum West, Phoenix, Arizona (2007)

== Collections ==
Cody's work is included in:

- Minneapolis Institute of Art
- Stark Museum of Art

== Awards ==
- Judges Award (Textiles), Heard Museum Fair and Market (2017)
- Native American Art Magazine Award, Southwestern Association for Indian Arts (2017)
- Best of Show Award, Autry National Center (2014)
- 2nd Place (Textiles), Heard Museum Guild Indian Fair & Market, Heard Museum (2013)
- Judge's Choice Award, Heard Museum Guild Indian Fair & Market, Heard Museum (2011)
- Conrad House Award, Heard Museum Guild Indian Fair & Market, Heard Museum (2010)
- Judge's Choice Award, Heard Museum Guild Indian Fair & Market, Heard Museum (2010)
- 1st Place (Textiles), Student Division, Santa Fe Indian Market (1998)
- 2nd Place (Fiber arts), Heard Museum Guild Native American Student Arts and Crafts Show, Heard Museum (1997)
- 2nd; 3rd Place (Textiles), Student Division, Santa Fe Indian Market (1996)
- 1st Place (Textiles), Youth Division, Santa Fe Indian Market (1995)
- 1st Place; Bob Davis Memorial Award (Textiles), Youth Division, Santa Fe Indian Market (1994)
- 1st; 3rd Place (Textiles), Santa Fe Indian Market (1993)
- 1st Ribbon (Textiles), Santa Fe Indian Market (1992)

== See also ==
- Art of the American Southwest
- Long Walk of the Navajo
- Navajo Nation
- Navajo weaving
