= Jesse Leigh =

American actor

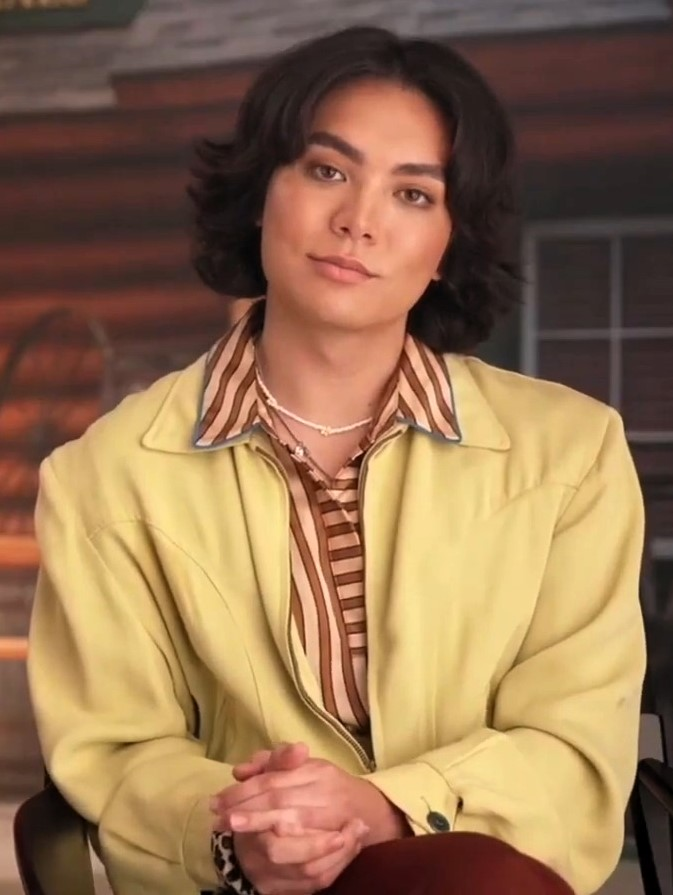
Leigh in 2022

Jesse Leigh is an American actor, known for portraying Bobbie Yang on the Peacock sitcom Rutherford Falls.

== Early life ==
Leigh was born in Woodland Hills, in Los Angeles, California.

They attended Orange County School of the Arts for high school.

Leigh graduated in 2020 as a Communication studies major at University of California, Los Angeles.

== Career ==
In 2018, they had a role on the Paramount Network series Heathers. They also appeared on the shows Foursome, Superstore, and Henry Danger.

In August 2020, it was announced Leigh was joining the main cast of the sitcom Rutherford Falls, starring Ed Helms. When Leigh auditioned for Rutherford Falls, the character of Bobbie was intended to be a male, but was rewritten as nonbinary for Leigh.

In an early review of Rutherford Falls for the web-site Decider, critic Joel Keller called Leigh the show's "sleeper star", writing, "Every time Jesse Leigh opens up their mouth as Bobbie, something funny comes out. We hope to see more of them during the first season."

== Personal life ==
Leigh is non-binary and goes by they/them pronouns.

== Filmography ==
=== Television ===
| Year | Title | Role | Notes |
|---|---|---|---|
| 2016 | Murder Among Friends | Runner | Episode: "Friend Fatale" |
| 2016 | Cast Me | Title Sequence Actor | 6 episodes |
| 2016 | Henry Danger | Dodger Dawg #1 | Episode: "Dodging Danger" |
| 2017 | Advocates | Oscar | Television film |
| 2018 | Foursome | Rubin | 10 episodes |
| 2018 | Heathers | Peter Dawson | 10 episodes |
| 2019 | Kingpin Katie | Teen 1 | Episode: "Fake-Ass" |
| 2019 | Superstore | Mason | Episode: "Mall Closing" |
| 2021-2022 | Rutherford Falls | Bobbie Yang | 18 episodes |
