= Serra da Estrela (sheep) =

Portuguese breed of sheep

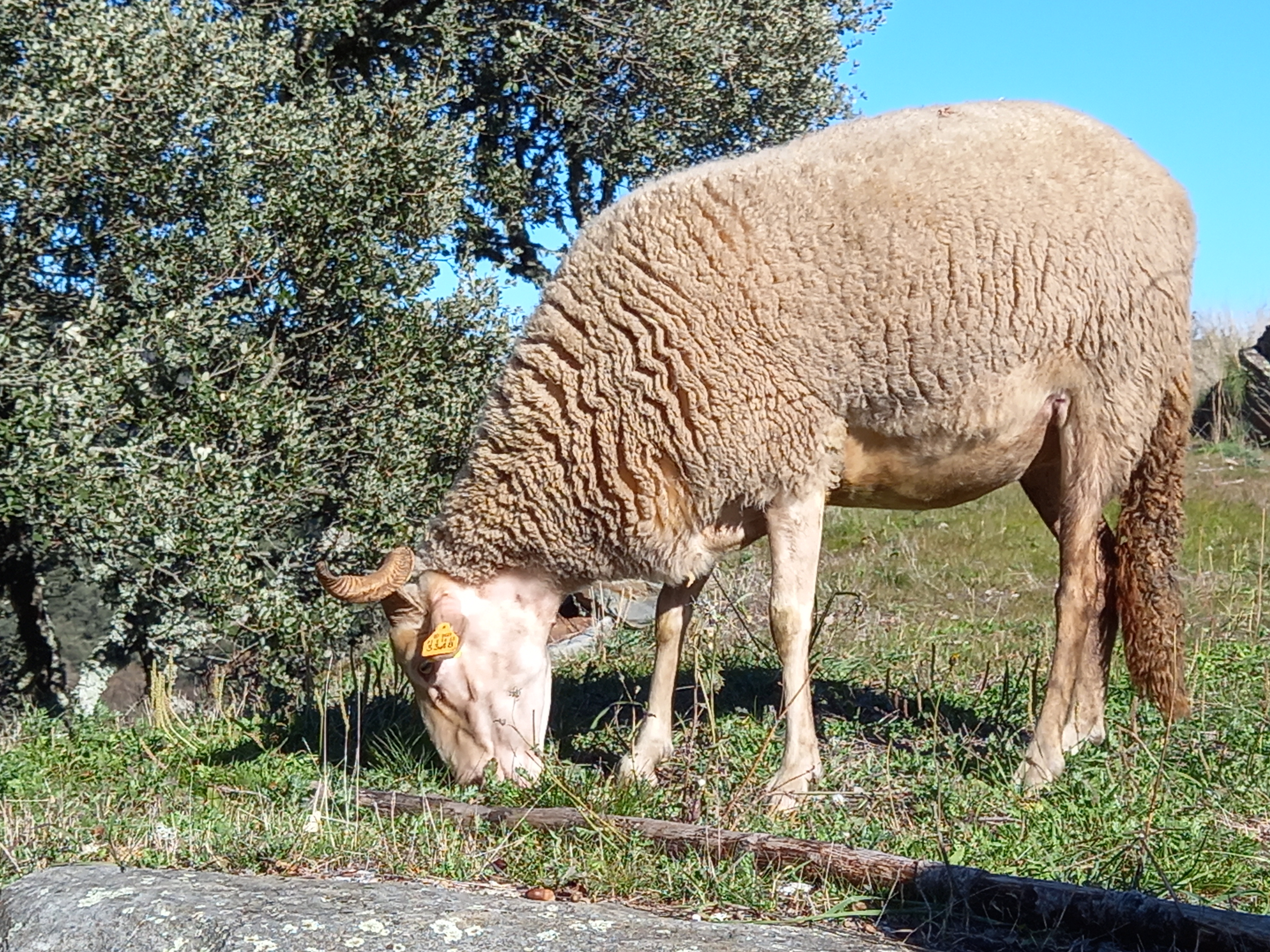
- Conservation status: FAO (2007): not at risk; DAD-IS (2024): not at risk
- Country of origin: Portugal
- Distribution: Beiras e Serra da Estrela
- Use: milk, lamb

Traits
- Weight: Male: 70 kg; Female: 50 kg
- Height: Male: 90 cm; Female: 80 cm
- Wool colour: usually white; 10% have black wool
- Face colour: as wool
- Horn status: horned in both sexes

The Serra da Estrela is a Portuguese breed of domestic sheep. It originates in the Serra da Estrela range of mountains in the Beiras e Serra da Estrela sub-region of east-central Portugal, and is distributed mainly in that area.

It is reared primarily for its milk, which is used in the production of the Queijo Serra da Estrela, a cheese which has European Denominação de Origem Protegida ('protected designation of origin') status.

== History ==
The Serra da Estrela is a traditional rural breed of east-central Portugal. It originates in the Serra da Estrela range of mountains in the Beiras e Serra da Estrela sub-region of east-central Portugal, and is distributed mainly in that area.

It was formerly reared under a transhumant system of management – the sheep were moved in June to high pastures on the massifs of the Serra da Estrela and on the Serra de Montemuro to the north, and were brought back down in August to lower areas such as the valley of the Mondego River. The Cão da Serra da Estrela breed of flock guardian dog originates in the same area and was formerly used to protect transhumant livestock from predators. In the twenty-first century, only a few flocks are moved up onto the Serra da Estrela for the summer months.

A breed society, the Associação Nacional Criadores Ovinos Serra da Estrela, was set up in 1981, and began recording milk production, at first in co-operation with the administration of the Serra da Estrela Natural Park. From 1984 it managed the flock book, which first appeared in 1986.

The sheep were formerly numerous: in 1986 the total population numbered 288000. In 2024 the total number was estimated to be 44992–50045 head, with a breeding stock of 22967 ewes and 779 rams in 268 flocks; its conservation status was listed as "at risk/vulnerable".

== Characteristics ==
The Serra da Estrela is usually white, sometimes spotted with brown on the legs and face; a black variant constitutes about 10% of the population. The face, legs and belly are without wool.

== Use ==
The sheep are kept mainly for milk production. The milk is high in fat and is used – with milk from the neighbouring Bordelaria and Churra Mondegueira breeds – in the production of the Queijo Serra da Estrela, a soft cheese which has European Denominação de Origem Protegida ('protected designation of origin') status.
