= Sierra Teller Ornelas =

Native American showrunner, screenwriter, filmmaker, and weaver

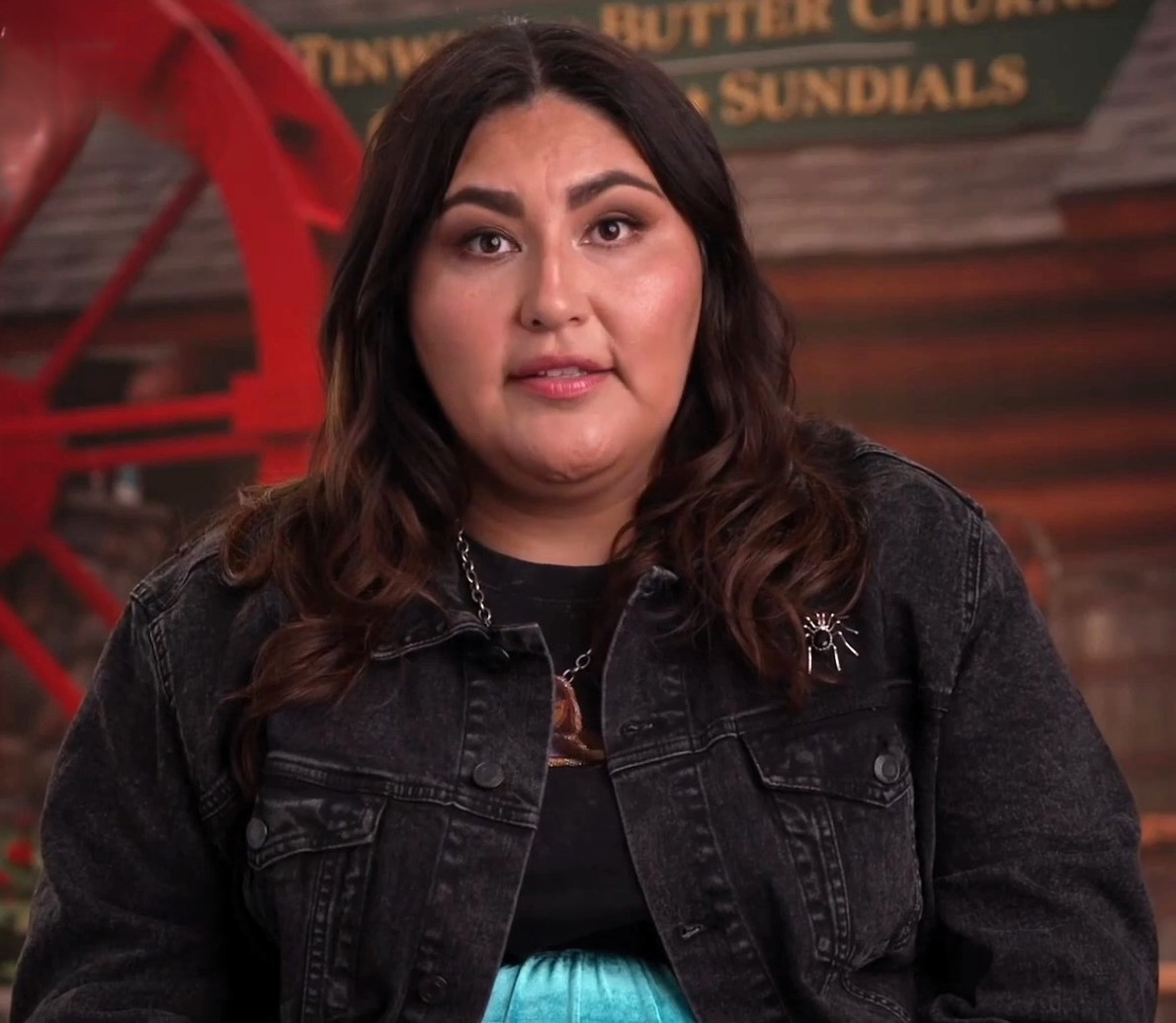
- Teller Ornelas in 2022
- Born: March 3, 1981 (age 45); Tucson, Arizona, U.S.
- Citizenship: Navajo Nation, American
- Education: University of Arizona
- Occupation: Television producer • screenwriter
- Parents: David Ornelas (father); Barbara Teller Ornelas (mother)

Sierra Nizhoni Teller Ornelas (Navajo, born March 3, 1981) is a Native American showrunner, screenwriter, filmmaker and sixth-generation tapestry weaver from Tucson, Arizona. She is one of three co-creators of the scripted NBC (Peacock) comedy series Rutherford Falls, alongside Ed Helms and Mike Schur.

Known for writing and production work on shows such as Brooklyn Nine-Nine, Happy Endings, Splitting Up Together, and Superstore, Teller Ornelas has also written and contributed to This American Life and the New York Times. In 2019 Teller Ornelas signed a multi-year development deal with Universal Television, beginning with the Peacock sitcom Rutherford Falls.

== Early life and education ==
Teller Ornelas was born March 3, 1981, in Tucson, Arizona. She is Navajo, born to the Edge Water clan. Her maternal grandfather is Water Flowing Together clan and her paternal grandfather is Mexican clan.

As a child, Teller Ornelas spend extended periods working alongside her mother, Barbara Teller Ornelas, as a tapestry weaver. The constant time she spent surrounded by Native art at gallery openings, Native art markets, and world-famous museums shielded Teller Ornelas from the poor representation of Indigenous culture in mainstream television. It was her moments tapestry weaving with her mother that sparked a deep interest in film and film writing. As early as second grade Teller Ornelas knew that she wanted to write for television.

Teller Ornelas attended a college preparatory high school in the late 1990s. During this period of her life, she furthered her appreciation for the act of storytelling and its impact on the lives of Indigenous peoples.

She attended the University of Arizona, where she studied media arts. There she discovered the long-running Comedy Corner troupe which held comedy sketches in the Student Union's Cellar. Teller Ornelas began as audience member and eventually became a key writer and producer. She graduated from the School of Theatre, Film & Television in 2005.

== Career ==
After graduating from college, Teller Ornelas worked for five years as a film programmer at the National Museum of the American Indian in Washington, D.C. In addition, Teller Ornelas, a sixth-generation Navajo weaver, was commissioned by the Arizona State Museum to make a documentary film, A Loom with a View: Modern Navajo Weavers, which explores the weaving of family members: mother, Barbara Teller Ornelas; great aunt, Margaret Yazzie; and brother, Michael Teller Ornelas.

She was inspired to leave that job and pursue her dreams of becoming a television writer by a "big swing" her mother and aunt had made in the 1980s when they spent four years weaving an enormous rug. (They sold it for $60,000, which changed their family's lives.)

In 2010, Teller Ornelas was selected for the Disney/ABC Television Group's diversity writing program. After this, she gained a position as a staff writer on Happy Endings. She contributed to a sub-plot in which Dave, played by Zachary Knighton, discovers he is one-sixteenth Navajo and begins playing into stereotypes about Native Americans. Teller Ornelas said in a 2011 interview with the Navajo Times that if done right, comedy can be a way to "get conversation going about very dense, complicated issues."

=== Rutherford Falls ===
Teller Ornelas, Ed Helms, and Mike Schur were co-creators of the series Rutherford Falls, which presented its first episode on NBC in 2021. As showrunner, Teller Ornelas oversaw a writers room that includes four other Indigenous writers – Tazbah Chavez, Tai Leclaire, Jana Schmieding, and Bobby Wilson.

Mike Schur and Ed Helms, both of whom she had previously collaborated with on various projects, initially pitched the show to Teller Ornelas, seeking her creativity and Native perspective to help bring the vision to fruition. Teller Ornelas aimed to counteract the sense of weightiness and emotional misrepresentation she frequently experienced when viewing Native stories on TV that were crafted by non-Native writers. Rutherford Falls provided Teller Ornelas with a platform to break Native stereotypes and showcase the diversity of Native experiences and highlight Native humanity through her storytelling talent.

Teller Ornelas was inspired to based the plot around museum employees from her experiences working at the Smithsonian. Teller Ornelas describes Indigenous people as the first storytellers and preservers of history, thus, she oriented the storyline around answering the questions, "What is American history? What are the narratives we cling to, and who gets erased from those narratives?" She sought to make the series comedy-based to disrupt the pattern of idealized or vilified depicitions of Native Americans on televisions.

Upon its premiere, the show receive positive reviews from critics for its comedic value and commitment to addressing Indigenous-related issues in the United States. After two seasons, Rutherford Falls was cancelled by Peacock in 2022. Nonetheless, Rutherford Falls made history marking Teller Ornelas as the first Indigenous showrunner and serving as the first major television production with five indigenous writers for a single series.

=== Other work ===
Following the cancellation of Rutherford Falls, Teller Ornelas co-wrote the Bay Area-based comedy with two other Native artists, Bobby Wilson and Jackie Keliiaa. She has described “City Indians” as “a progression of the Native comedy that I really enjoy making” and as “too damn special not to exist in the world.” She later sold the pilot for a workplace comedy called “City Indians” to NBC.

=== Future projects ===
In December 2022, Teller Ornelas alongside television writer, Marco Luevanos, and television director and producer, Morgan Sackett, announced their plans to develop a half-hour multi-cam comedy entitled Amigos for NBC. The show is set to be based in Los Angeles, California where six Latin friends (i.e. amigos) support and rag each other while exploring love, maturing, and defining success in the modern world. The show has yet to be released.

In January 2024, Teller Ornelas and Jana Schmieding announced their collaborative project, Bonnie. The multi-camera family comedy centered on a former backup singer who, fifteen years earlier, abandoned the touring life to settle on the reservation where she will fulfill her dream of being the "cool auntie" while helping raise her brother's children. Teller Ornelas is utilizing this project to continue her legacy of bring Native American representation and creativity to major network television. The show is expected to include Morgan Sackett, Jonathan Berry, and Katie Newman as executive producers.

== Filmography ==
=== Television ===
Year	Title	Credited as			
Year	Title	Creator	Director	Writer	Producer
2011	Happy Endings	No	No	Yes	No
2013	Brooklyn Nine-Nine	No	No	No	Yes
2014	The Hustle	No	No	Yes	No
2014	Selfie	No	No	Yes	No
2014	Surviving Jack	No	No	Yes	No
2015	Superstore	No	No	Yes	Yes
2018	Splitting Up Together	No	No	Yes	Yes
2021	Rutherford Falls	Yes	No	Yes	Yes
2022	Loot	No	No	Yes	Yes
2024	St. Denis Medical	No	No	Yes	No
