= Algarve Churro =

Portuguese breed of sheep

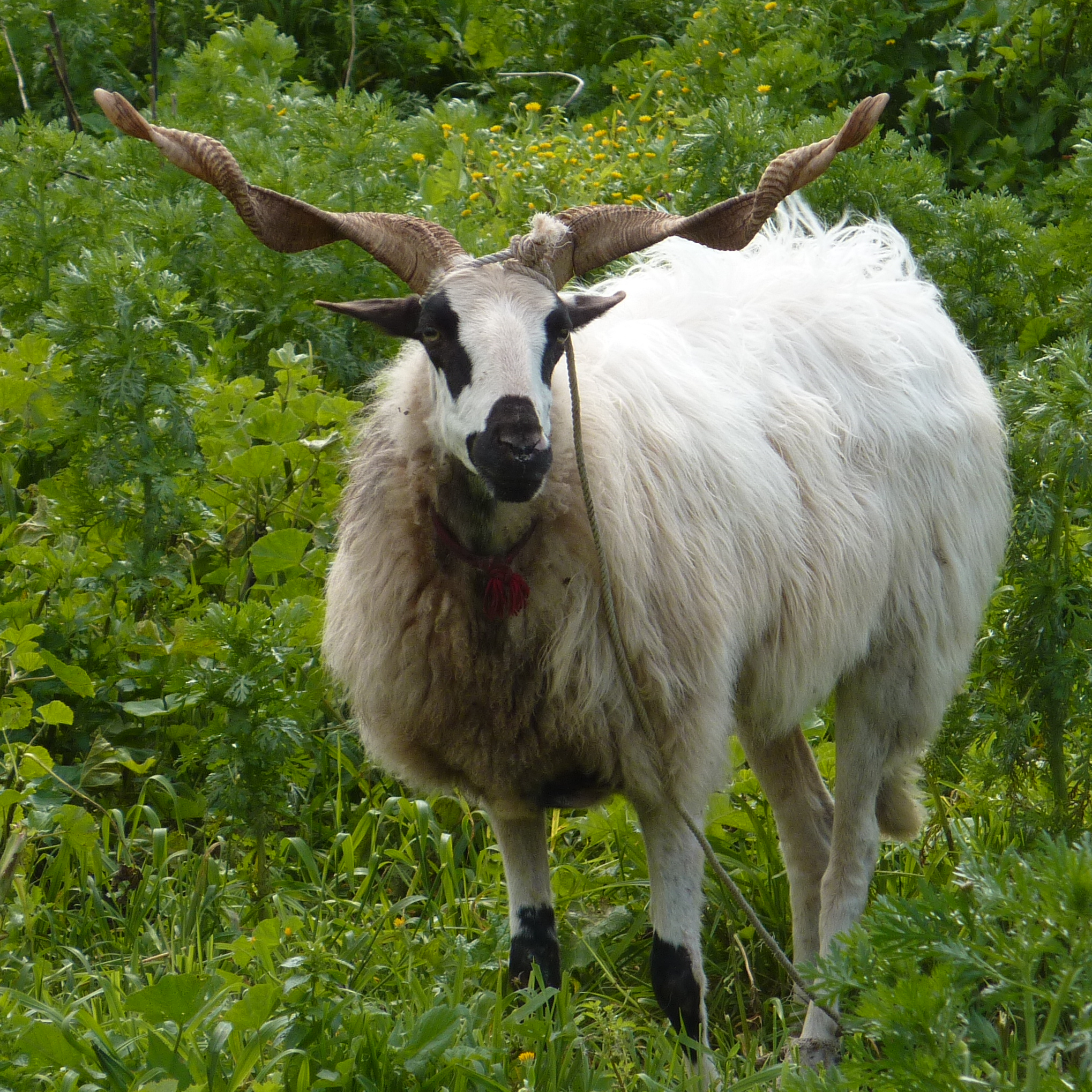
- A ram
- Conservation status: FAO (2007): not at risk; DAD-IS (2024): at risk/vulnerable
- Other names: Churra Algarvia
- Country of origin: Portugal
- Distribution: Algarve
- Use: Meat, wool, milk, vegetation management

Traits
- Weight: Male: 75 kg (170 lb); Female: 55 kg (120 lb)
- Height: Male: 95 cm (37 in); Female: 85 cm (33 in)
- Wool color: Usually white; 10% have black wool
- Face color: White with black markings
- Horn status: Both sexes are horned

The Algarve Churro or Churra Algarvia is a Portuguese breed of domestic sheep. It is distributed mainly in the Algarve and Alto Alentejo regions of southern Portugal, particularly in the arid Barrocal sub-region of the Algarve. It is primarily raised for its meat, although it also produces and is raised for carpet wool. Traditionally, it was also raised for its milk, used in cheesemaking, and for vegetation management. In subsistence agriculture, the traditional uses of the breed persist.

== History ==
This breed, according to some sources, originated from Andalusian Churro stock imported between 1870 and 1890. However, according to other sources, they are an autochthonous variety of the Iberian Churro, the Andalusian varieties being native to large stretches of Spain contiguous with the Portuguese breed's historical range and possessing similar characteristics. They are mainly found in the district of Faro. Traditionally, they were raised for their lean but flavourful meat, milk for cheesemaking, and wool for mattress-filling. They were also commonly raised for vegetation management and to reduce produce waste. The population of this breed has been decreasing. In 1996, there were greater than 23,000 and in 2004, there were greater than 1300. According to the DGAV (Direção geral de allmentação e veterinária), a 2019 studbook registered purebred adults, listing 64 rams and 1626 ewes. In 2024 the total population had risen to an estimated 7411–8252 head, with a breeding stock of 3822 ewes and 63 rams in 47 flocks; its conservation status was listed as "at risk/vulnerable".

== Characteristics ==
The sheep are usually white, with black markings on the feet and head; about 10% of the population has black wool. The fleece is mostly confined to the neck and trunk of the animal, leaving the head, lower legs, and belly exposed. The staples are 20–30 cm (7.9–12 in) in length and are pointy and open.

Both sexes have ridged horns, although the horns are smaller and less developed in ewes, in rams they project outward in wide spirals.

The animals are known for their large stature, lively temperament, and general hardiness. Mature rams grow on average to 95 cm (37 in) at the withers and weigh 75 kg (170 lb). However, ewes grow to an average 85 cm (33 in) at the withers, weighing 55 kg (120 lb) at maturity.

Although not a variety of fat-tailed sheep, the animals have long tails which are broad at the base.
