= Churra Galega Bragançana Branca =

Portuguese breed of sheep

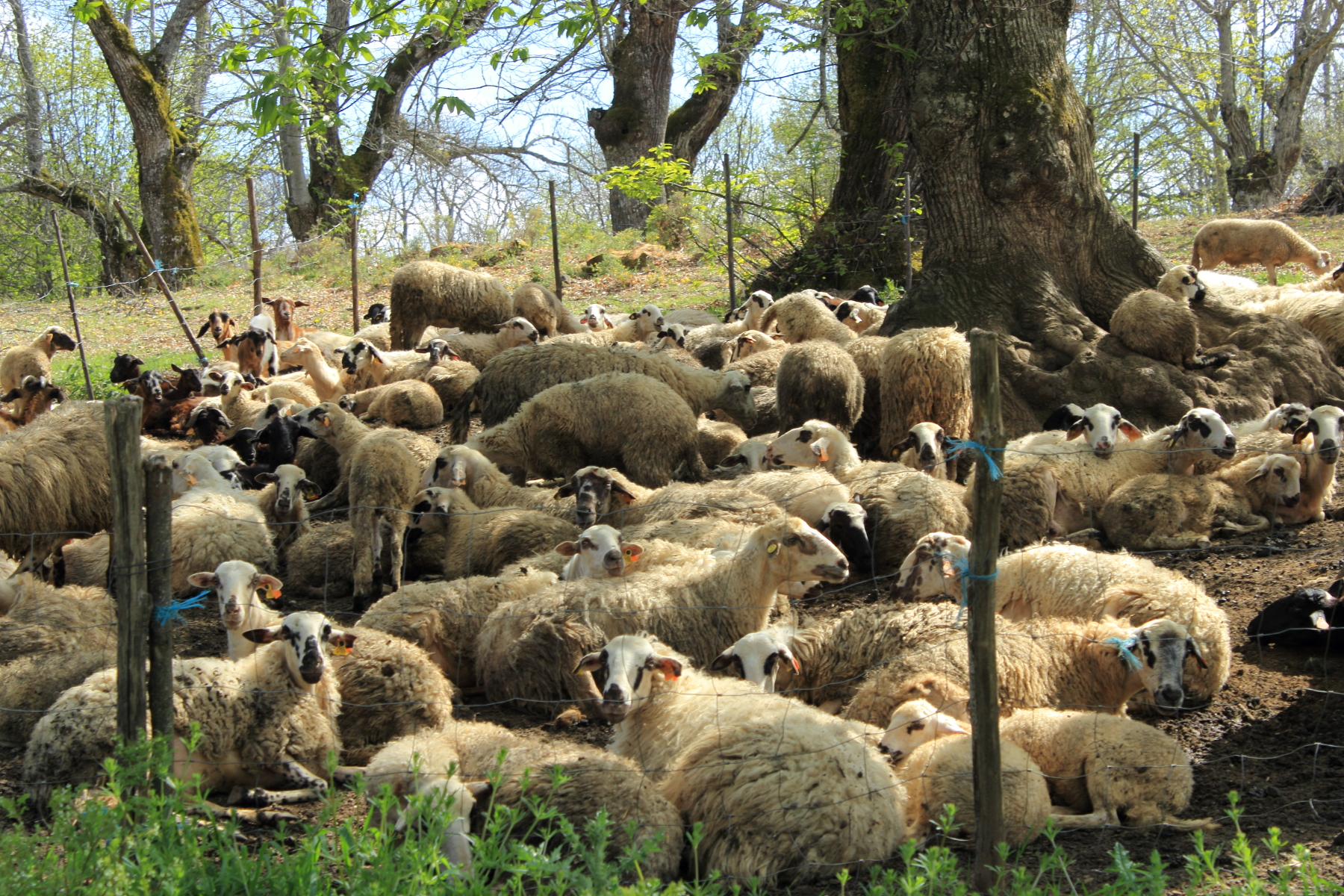
- Conservation status: FAO (2007): not at risk; DAD-IS (2024): not at risk
- Country of origin: Portugal
- Distribution: District of Bragança
- Use: lamb, mutton

Traits
- Weight: Male: 50–60 kg; Female: 35–50 kg
- Height: Male: 95 cm; Female: 85 cm
- Wool colour: white or cream, with black markings on face and legs
- Horn status: males usually horned, ewes polled

The Churra Galega Bragançana Branca is a Portuguese breed of domestic sheep. It originates in, and is raised in, the Terra Fria Transmontana in the District of Bragança in north-eastern Portugal, on the border with the Spanish autonomous community of Galicia. It is one of four churra sheep breeds in the district of Bragança, the others being the Churra da Terra Quente, the Churra Galega Bragançana Preta and the Churra Galega Mirandesa.

== History ==
The Churra Galega Bragançana Branca is a traditional rural breed of north-eastern Portugal, belonging to the widespread churra or coarse-wool Iberian type. It originates in the mountainous Terra Fria Transmontana, the northern part of the District of Bragança, in the historical-geographical region of Trás-os-Montes. It is distributed principally in Bragança and in the concelho of Vinhais, particularly on the massifs of the Serra da Coroa, the Serra de Montesinho and the Serra da Nogueira within the Parque Natural de Montesinho, and so also within the larger Reserva da Biosfera Transfronteiriça Meseta Ibérica. Some are reared also in the neighbouring concelhos of Chaves, Macedo de Cavaleiros, Mirandela, Valpaços and Vimioso.

The Galego or Bragançano was first described as a distinct population in Trás-os-Montes in 1941 by Francisco Felgueiras Júnior, who was superintendent of animal husbandry in the area.

The sheep were formerly more numerous: in 1941 the Galego or Bragançano type constituted some 80% of a total of about 248000 sheep in the district, or approximately 200000; in 1986 the total population numbered over 155000. By 1990 it had fallen to approximately 5000 head, and the breed was thought to be at risk of extinction. Herd-book registration began in 1991, and a breed society, the Associação Nacional de Criadores de Ovinos da Raça Churra Galega Bragançana, was established. In 2024 the total number was estimated to be 30062–33434 head, with a breeding stock of 15329 ewes and 548 rams in 157 flocks; its conservation status was listed as "not at risk".

The breed society also maintains the herd-book for the Churra Galega Bragançana Preta, a black-woolled variant, which was officially recognised as a separate breed in 2015.

== Characteristics ==
The Churra Galega Bragancana Branca is white or cream-coloured, with black patches round the eyes and round the muzzle; black markings may also appear on the legs. The face, the front of the neck, the legs and the belly are without wool. Rams usually have large horns of spiral shape, ewes are normally polled.

== Use ==
The sheep were traditionally kept for meat and for wool and for their manure, which was of considerable economic importance and was one of the principal reasons for which sheep were kept in the region. The flocks were managed extensively, grazing for much of the year on fallow agricultural land and so fertilising it; in the summer months they spent the hot hours of the day in shady woodland, coming out at night to graze.

In the twenty-first century they are kept mainly for meat production. Lamb reared under certain conditions and slaughtered at 3–4 months old, at a weight of some 10–12 kg, may be marketed as Cordeiro Bragançano, which has European Denominação de Origem Protegida ('protected designation of origin') status.

Ram fleeces weigh some 3.5–4.5 kg, ewe fleeces roughly 1.5–2.5 kg. The staple length is some 120–150 mm, rather shorter than in most Churra sheep; fibres have a diameter of 30–37 μ.
