= Leupp Schools, Inc. =

Bureau of Indian Education grant-funded school in Arizona

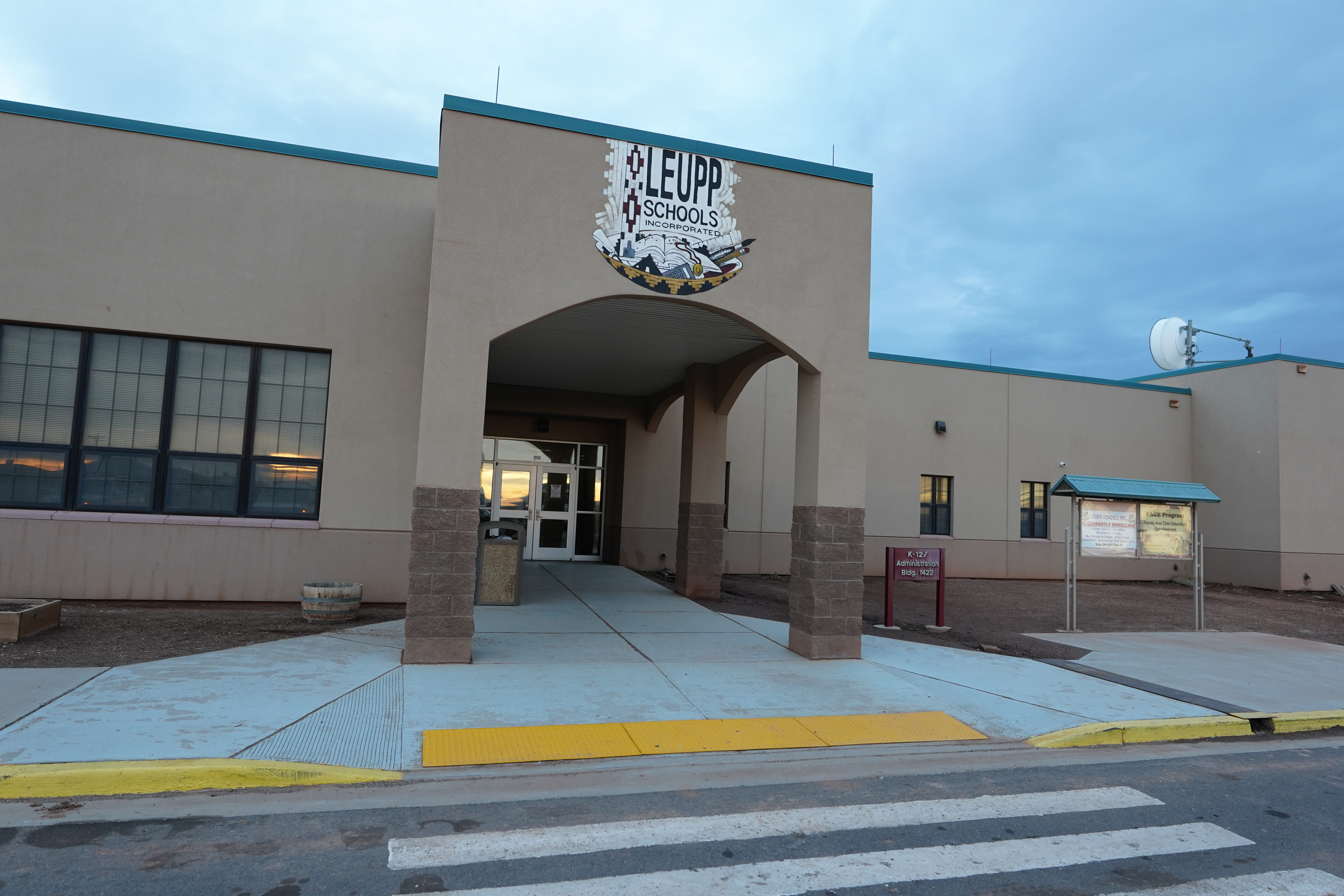
Administration building

Leupp Schools, Inc., is a K-12 grant-funded school affiliated with the Bureau of Indian Education. It is in Leupp, Arizona and has a Winslow postal address. Its GNIS is 7538.

== History ==
In 1959 and 1960 the school was built. In 1974 the school did not yet have high school, and so some students went to a boarding school facility in Flagstaff, Arizona so they could go to school there. Some others went to Tuba City High School.

In 1976 there was a proposal for the Leupp Boarding School to become a district public school of the Flagstaff Unified School District. In a letter to the editor to the Arizona Daily Sun the principal Allen H. Ross disputed that his own school was proposing such.

== Campus ==
In 1974 it had a field for American football.

In 1974 the school had a dormitory.

== Student body ==
In 1974 students originated from a 50 miles (80 km) diameter around the school.

As of that year the majority had already obtained English fluency as they began living in dormitories. Aides were used for those who still needed English fluency. Such aides at the time spoke Hopi and Navajo.
