= Tolani Lake, Arizona =

CDP in Coconino County, Arizona

- census-designated place
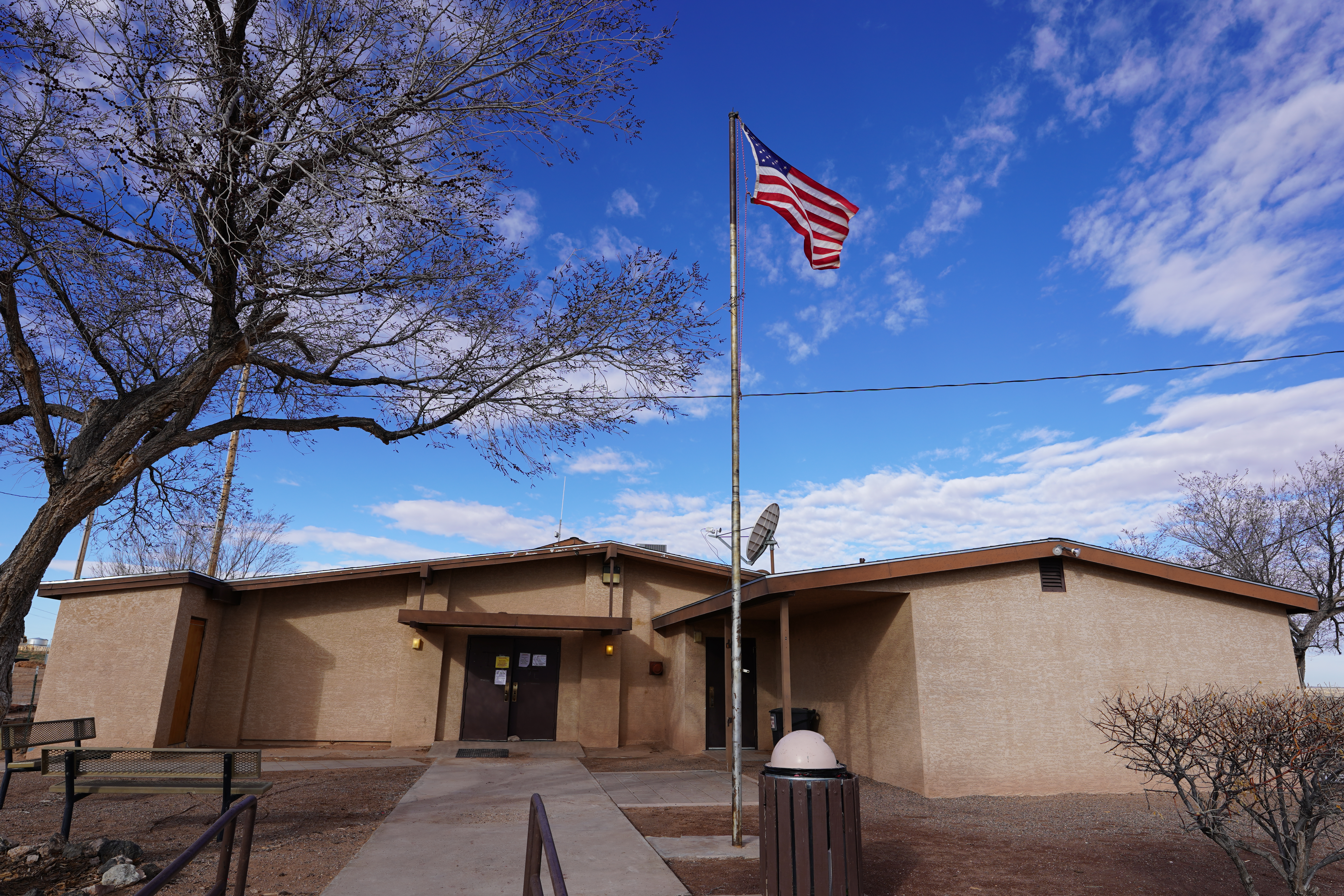
- Tonali Lake Chapter House, February 2019

- Location of Tolani Lake in Coconino County, Arizona.

- Location in the United States
- Coordinates: 35°25′47″N 110°50′28″W
- Country: United States
- State: Arizona
- County: Coconino

Area
  - Total: 0.63 sq mi (1.64 km^{2})
  - Land: 0.63 sq mi (1.64 km^{2})
  - Water: 0 sq mi (0.00 km^{2})
- Elevation: 4,958 ft (1,511 m)

Population (2020)
  - Total: 227
  - Density: 359.3/sq mi (138.74/km^{2})
- Time zone: UTC-7 (MST (no daylight saving time))
- ZIP code: 86035
- Area code: 928
- FIPS code: 04-74120
- GNIS feature ID: 2582877

Tolani Lake (Navajo: To'ne'heliih, meaning "Water Collecting in a Basin") is a census-designated place in the eastern portion of Coconino County, Arizona, United States, near the Navajo County border. Tolani Lake is located north of Winslow. The population as of the 2010 U.S. Census was 280.

== Demographics ==
Historical population
Census	Pop.	Note	%±
2020	227		—
U.S. Decennial Census

== Economy ==
Commuters go to Leupp, Winslow, and Flagstaff for employment. The community services coordinator of the Tolani Lake Chapter, Valerie Kelly, stated in 2014 that "Employment is very limited."

== Education ==
Residents are within the Flagstaff Unified School District. Residents attend Leupp Elementary School. For secondary grades residents are zoned to Mount Elden Middle School and Flagstaff High School.

There was previously Tolani Lake Elementary School. Teacher housing was being built for it, but was never used due to the school's 2006 closure. The Arizona Republic referred to the teacher housing as a white elephant project. Vandals later attacked the buildings. The housing was in a dome shape, described by Cindy Yurth of the Navajo Times as being "futuristic-looking".

== See also ==
- List of census-designated places in Arizona
