= Churra =

Spanish breed of sheep

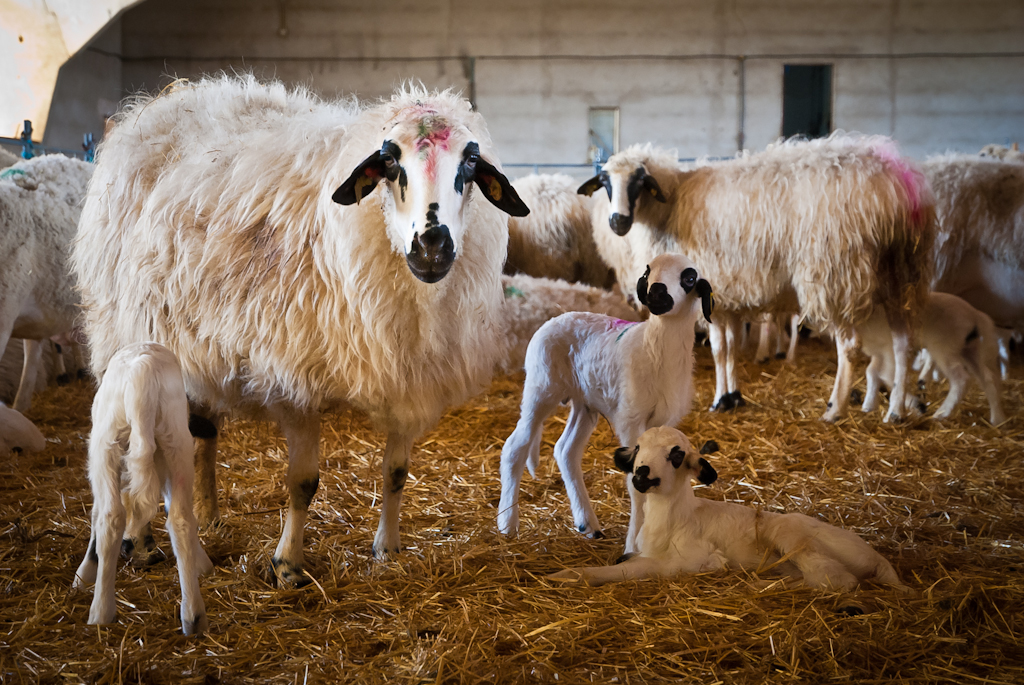
- Ewes and lambs in Segovia
- Conservation status: DAD-IS (2023): not at risk
- Other names: Churra Lebrijana; Churra Tensina; Oveja Churra
- Country of origin: Portugal; Spain

Traits
- Weight: Male: 75 kg; Female: 65 kg
- Height: Male: 80 cm; Female: 70 cm
- Wool colour: white
- Face colour: black-and-white

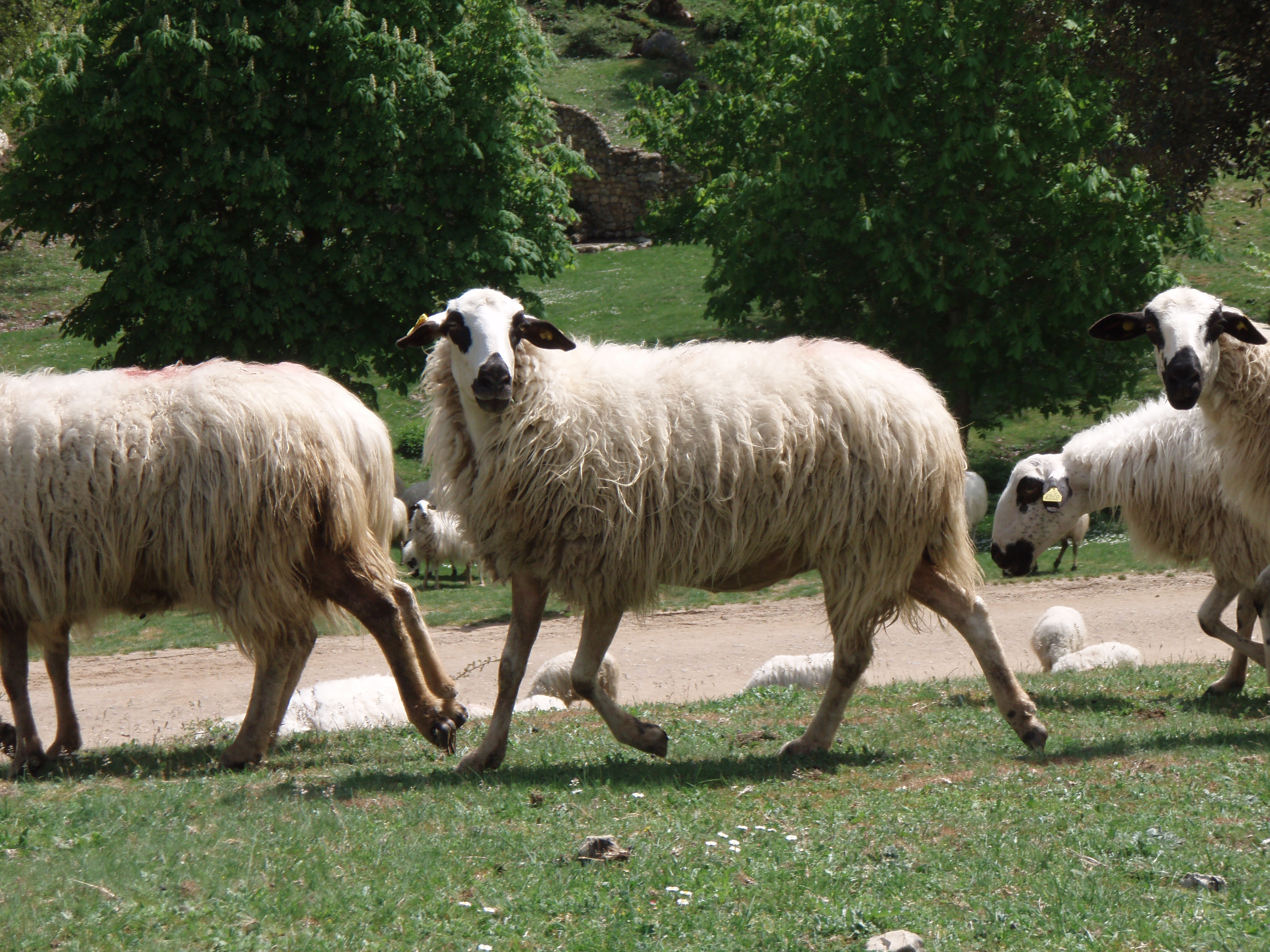
On the Dehesa de Espinosilla, Palencia, Spain

The Churra is an Iberian type, breed or group of breeds of sheep. The word churra simply means 'coarse-woolled'. The Churra originates in the Duero Valley in the autonomous community of Castile and León in north-western Spain. In the province of Zamora the milk is used to make Zamorano cheese.

== Churra breeds and types ==
There are numerous regional variants of the Churra in Spain. Two of these are recognised as separate breeds: the Churra Lebrijana of Andalusia, also known as the Atlantica or Marismeña, named for Lebrija on the Guadalquivir and found in the coastal provinces of Cadiz and Huelva in south-western Spain; and the Churra Tensina, named for the Valle de Tena in the province of Huesca in the central Pyrenees. Others include the small Sayaguesa, associated with the comarca of Sayago in the south of the province of Zamora and reared mostly for meat; the Churra del Bierzo or Blanca del Bierzo, an endangered polled type from the comarca of El Bierzo in the province of León; and the Churra Castellana or Churra Campera of Castile.

== Use ==
The Churra is a traditional triple-purpose breed, reared for milk, for meat and for its wool, which is of coarse quality suitable for carpet-making. Sheep of this type were taken by the conquistadores to the New World, where they gave rise to American breeds such as the Chiapas and the Navajo-Churro. Cross-breeding with the Merino has given rise to the Spanish: entrefino or medium-fine group of breeds in Spain, and to the Churra Algarvia breed in Portugal. Other Portuguese Churra breeds include the Churra Badana, the Churra Galega Bragançana Branca, the Churra Galega Bragançana Preta, the Churra Galega Mirandesa, the Churra Mondegueira, the Churra da Terra Quente, the Churra do Campo and the Churra do Minho.
