= Leupp, Arizona =

Community in Coconino County, Arizona, United States

Leupp, Arizona Tsiizizii (Navajo)
- Census-designated place
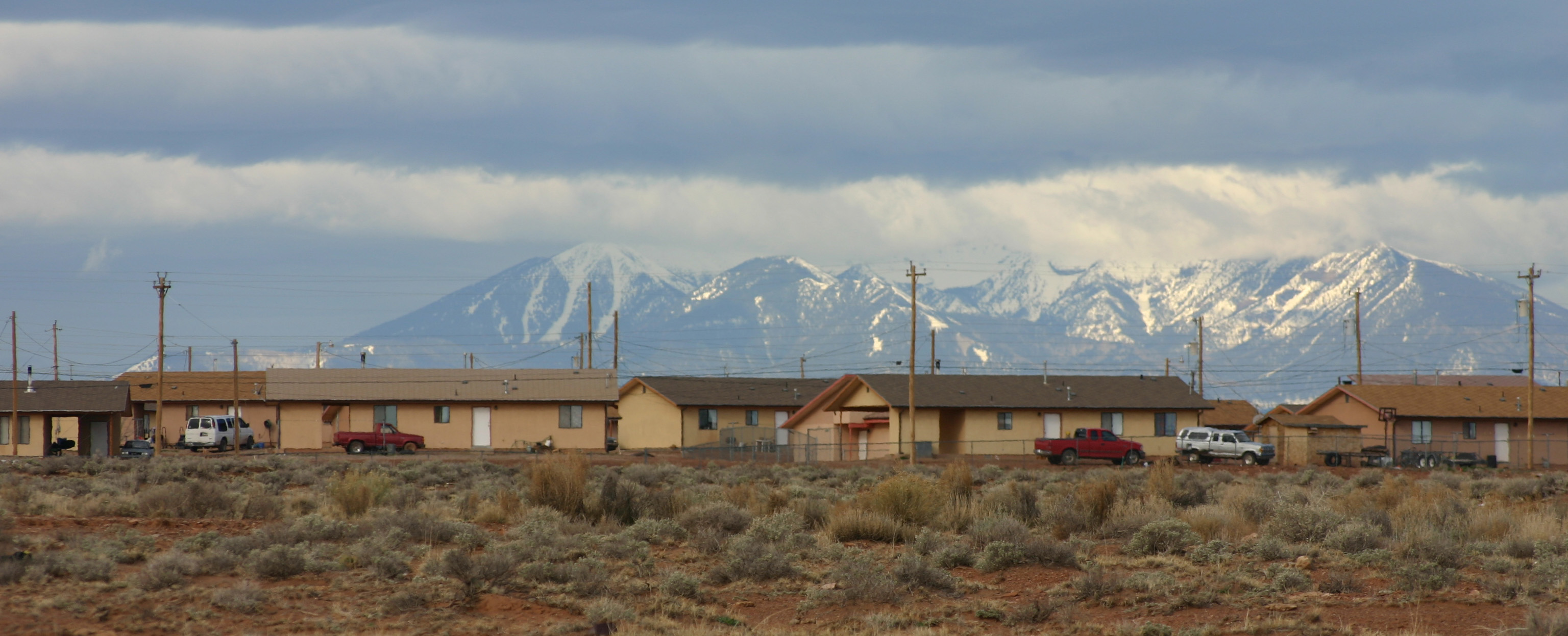
- Leupp, looking west to the San Francisco Peaks

- Location in Coconino County and the state of Arizona

- Location in Arizona#Location in the United States Leupp (the United States)
- Coordinates: 35°17′43″N 111°00′00″W
- Country: United States
- State: Arizona
- County: Coconino

Area
  - Total: 13.56 sq mi (35.12 km^{2})
  - Land: 13.55 sq mi (35.10 km^{2})
  - Water: 0.0077 sq mi (0.02 km^{2})
- Elevation: 4,754 ft (1,449 m)

Population (2020)
  - Total: 934
  - Density: 68.9/sq mi (26.61/km^{2})
- Time zone: UTC-7 (MST)
- ZIP code: 86035
- Area code: 928
- FIPS code: 04-40630
- GNIS feature ID: 2408602

Leupp /luːp/ LOOP (Navajo: Tsiizizii) is a census-designated place (CDP) on the Navajo Nation in Coconino County, Arizona, United States. The population was 951 at the 2010 census.

In 1902 an Indian boarding school was constructed here, administered by the Bureau of Indian Affairs. It had been closed before the US entry into World War II. In 1942 the facility was converted for use as the Leupp Isolation Center, designed to detain Japanese and Japanese-American internees from the several larger internment camps established by the War Relocation Authority to hold citizens and immigrants from the West Coast. They were sent here if characterized as troublemakers; some were men trying to regain their rights as American citizens.

== History ==
The Navajo and their ancestors occupied this area for thousands of years. In 1868 they were forced by the United States to agree to a reservation, which was within the New Mexico Territory until 1912. After Arizona and New Mexico were admitted as states, the reservation extended across their common border.

In 1902, the Bureau of Indian Affairs established an Indian boarding school in Leupp, to serve Navajo and other Native American children in the large region. The population was spread out too far for most children to be able to commute to the school, so they lived as boarders at the BIA school. Soon afterward, the school was moved to a new location known as Old Leupp. Old Leupp is a few miles to the southeast of Leupp.

In 1907, Leupp was designated by the Bureau of Indian Affairs as the headquarters of the Leupp Indian Land. The BIA had an office at Leupp. This was one of five Navajo Indian Lands that existed before 1936, when the nation reorganized under a constitutional government.

- Leupp Trading Post

In 1910, John Walker built the Leupp Trading Post from quarried sandstone at the newly established community now called "Old Leupp". The BIA had begun building its agency headquarters there for this part of the Navajo lands. By 1912, Walker sold the post to an unknown party.

In 1929 Stanton K. Borum and his wife Ida Mae became owners of the Leupp Trading Post. They added to the original structure, creating a two-story structure: the Trading Post was on the ground floor and their residence on the second floor.

In 1944 William E. and Lucile McGee, who had been in the trading post business since 1923, purchased Leupp Trading Post from Ida Mae Borum. After William and Lucile retired in 1968, their son, Ralph, and his wife, Ellen, took over the business, running the Leupp Trading Post until 1982.

In the late 20th century, the trading post was closed. The building was dismantled so that its materials could be used elsewhere. Nothing other than the foundation remains.

== World War II ==
Choctaw and Cherokee American soldiers served as code talkers in Europe during World War I, also known as the Great War. Germans were known to have sent people to the US in the postwar period to learn these languages before World War II broke out, so the US did not repeat using code talkers from these tribes in Europe.

Philip Johnston was a European American who had grown up in the Leupp area with his missionary parents, where he learned some Navajo. As an engineer in World War II, he suggested to the Marines to use the Navajo language as a code against the Japanese. He knew how impenetrable and complex the language was, making it nearly impossible for an outsider to learn easily. The Navajo language is so complex with its dialect and sentence structure that it would take code talkers 2 1/2 minutes to successfully translate and transmit and then re-translate the message. But this effort would have taken hours for soldiers trained in other codes to complete. Had it not been for growing up in this area, Johnston probably would have never interacted with the Navajo people and learned the language, and the Navajo code talkers may not have been used. Their effort is believed to have helped the US in the war immeasurably. Their code, based on Navajo, was unbreakable until the US government released the top-secret files years later.

=== Leupp Isolation Center ===
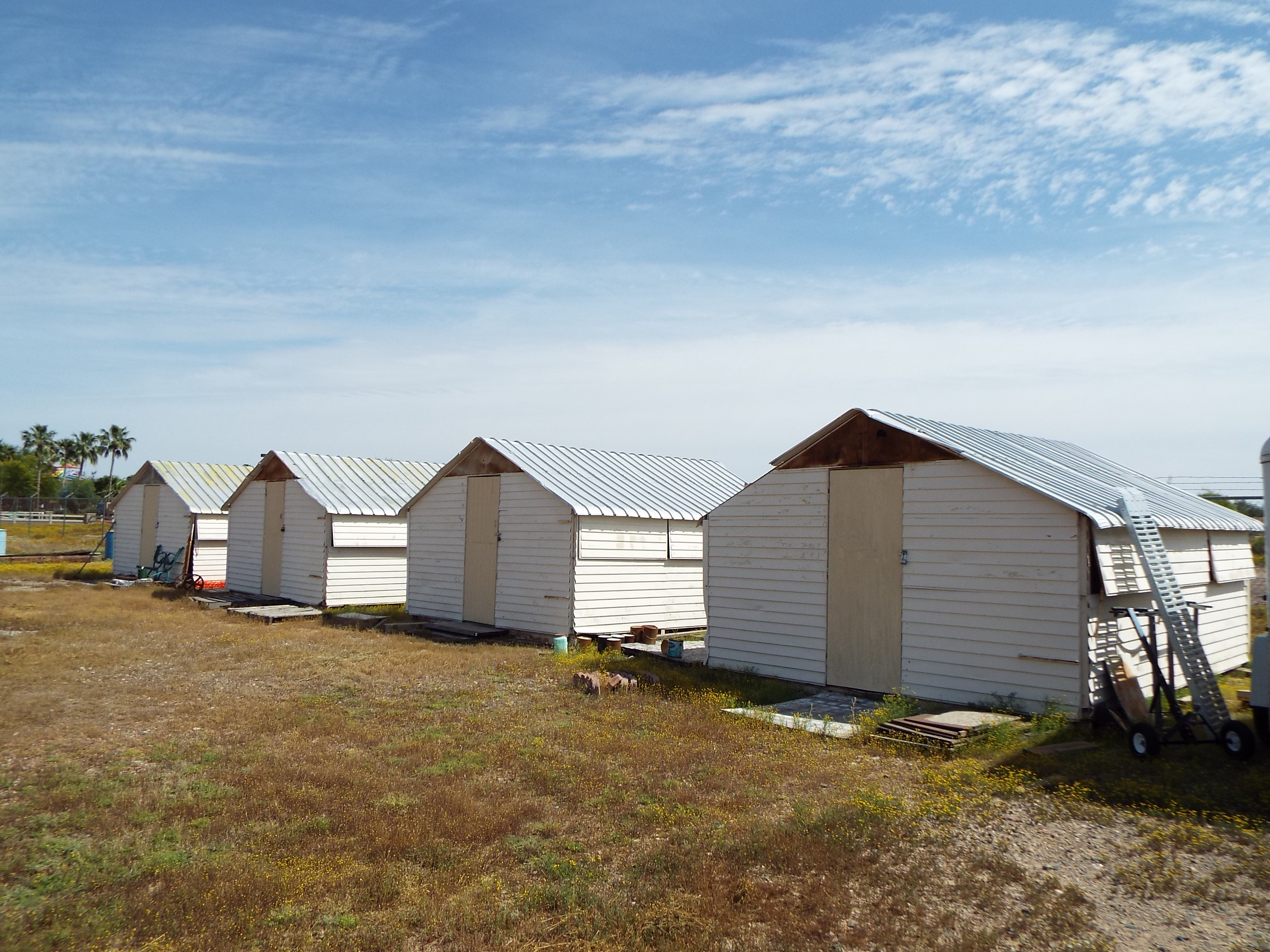
These Japanese Internment Camp Houses were once located in Leupp. These houses were relocated to the grounds of the Sahuaro Central Railroad Museum in Glendale, Arizona.

During World War II, the US Army took over the abandoned Bureau of Indian Affairs boarding school in Leupp to use as the Leupp Isolation Center, for Japanese American internees considered "troublemakers" by authorities at other internment camps. The first inmates were transferred from Manzanar Isolation Center, which had preceded the use of Leupp for this purpose. In December 1942 a clash had taken place between camp guards and several hundred Japanese-American internees. Two prisoners were killed, and nine prisoners and one guard were injured.

The 16 men suspected as having instigated the protests were removed from camp and placed in surrounding town jails. While they were held in jail (without being charged with a crime or allowed a hearing), War Relocation Authority officials converted a former Civilian Conservation Corps camp outside Moab, Utah, into a temporary isolation center for "noncompliant" Japanese Americans. The 16 men from Manzanar arrived in Moab on January 11, 1943. Over the next three months, another 25 "troublemakers"—mostly men who had resisted the WRA's attempts to assess the loyalty of incarcerated Japanese Americans by asking them to take a poorly worded oath—were brought to Moab. On April 27 most of the population was transferred to Leupp. (Five men, serving sentences in the nearby county jail after protesting conditions in the isolation center, were transported to Leupp in a five-by-six-foot box on the back of a truck. Their separate transportation was arranged by Moab director Francis Frederick, who had also sentenced them for "unlawful assembly.")

Additional internees were sent here from Tule Lake, Topaz and other camps. Leupp housed a population of approximately 50–60 prisoners at a time, with a total of 80 Japanese Americans passing through the isolation center while it operated. The 52 inmates then residing in Leupp were transferred to the stockade at Tule Lake (converted to a segregation center for "disloyal" Japanese Americans earlier that year) on December 2, 1943. The camp technically remained open, retained with minimal maintenance, until September 20, 1944. On that date it was returned to Department of the Interior authority.

== Geography ==
According to the United States Census Bureau, the CDP has a total area of 13.6 square miles (35.1 km^{2}), of which 0.01 square miles (0.02 km^{2}), or 0.05%, is water.

It is about 45 miles (72 km) southeast of Flagstaff.

=== Climate ===
According to the Köppen Climate Classification system, Leupp has a semi-arid climate, abbreviated "BSk" on climate maps.

== Demographics ==
Historical population
Census	Pop.	Note	%±
2000	970		—
2010	951		−2.0%
2020	934		−1.8%
U.S. Decennial Census

As of the census of 2000, there were 970 people, 228 households, and 206 families residing in the CDP. The population density was 73.9 inhabitants per square mile (28.5/km^{2}). There were 277 housing units at an average density of 21.1 per square mile (8.1/km^{2}). The racial makeup of the CDP was 98.1% Native American, 0.6% White, 0.1% from other races, and 1.1% from two or more races. 1.0% of the population were Hispanic or Latino of any race.

There were 228 households, out of which 54.8% had children under the age of 18 living with them, 57.9% were married couples living together, 29.8% had a female householder with no husband present, and 9.6% were non-families. 9.2% of all households were made up of individuals, and 0.9% had someone living alone who was 65 years of age or older. The average household size was 4.25 and the average family size was 4.53.

In the CDP, the age distribution of the population shows 43.7% under the age of 18, 8.8% from 18 to 24, 25.7% from 25 to 44, 17.2% from 45 to 64, and 4.6% who were 65 years of age or older. The median age was 23 years. For every 100 females, there were 92.8 males. For every 100 females age 18 and over, there were 85.1 males.

The median income for a household in the CDP was $21,458, and the median income for a family was $29,219. Males had a median income of $28,661 versus $24,531 for females. The per capita income for the CDP was $8,137. About 29.4% of families and 33.4% of the population were below the poverty line, including 45.0% of those under age 18 and 43.1% of those age 65 or over.

== Education ==
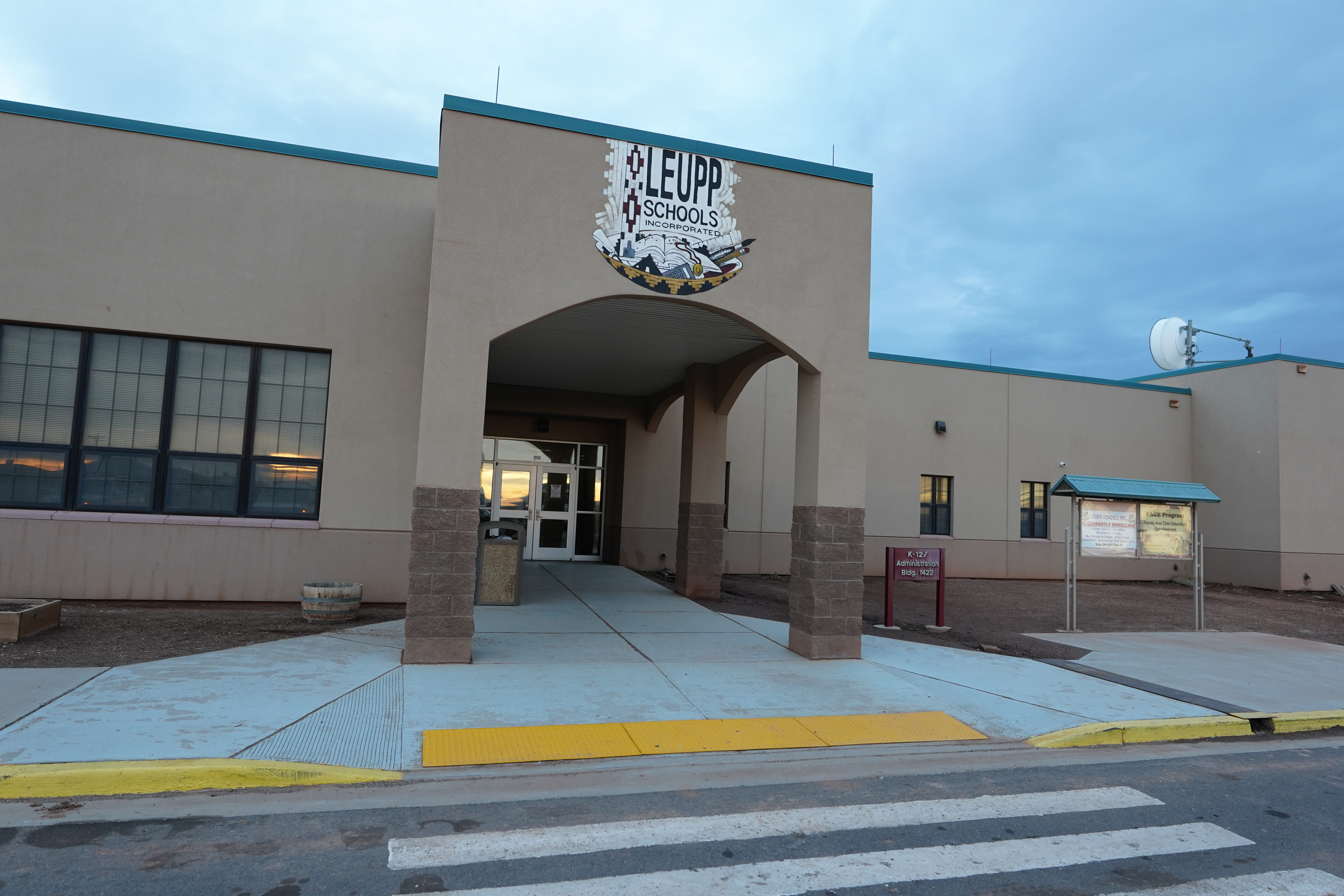
Leupp Schools (tribal school)

Leupp is zoned to schools in the Flagstaff Unified School District (FUSD). It operates Leupp Public School here, a K-5 elementary school. As of 2018 all of the students are Native American. In addition to Leupp, its attendance zone includes Birdsprings and Tolani Lake. The sole FUSD school in the Navajo reservation, it previously served as a K-8 school. Grades 6–8 are now served by another school.

According to Mitch Strohmann, the public relations official at FUSD, this school, in 2002, had "made some amazing strides in recent years."

Construction on the current campus was scheduled to start in summer 2002. Within the campus, which had a cost of $2.8 million, is a hogan that was dedicated in January 2002. FUSD consulted with the school community on the design of the school.

For secondary grades, residents are zoned to Mount Elden Middle School and Flagstaff High School.

Leupp Schools, Inc. is a tribally controlled boarding school located here. The Navajo Nation manages and operates it under contract to the Bureau of Indian Education (BIE), which funds it.

== Notable residents ==
- Marilou Schultz (Navajo; born 1954), textile artist and math teacher
- Martha Gorman Schultz (Navajo; 1931–2025), textile artist

== See also ==
- List of census-designated places in Arizona
- List of communities on the Navajo Nation
