= Smoke Signal, Arizona =

Populated place in Navajo County, Arizona, US

- Populated place
- Location within the state of Arizona Smoke Signal (the United States)
- Coordinates: 35°58′48″N 110°02′42″W
- Country: United States
- State: Arizona
- County: Navajo
- Elevation: 6,418 ft (1,956 m)
- Time zone: UTC-7 (Mountain (MST))
  - Summer (DST): UTC-7 (MST)
- Area code: 928
- FIPS code: 04-67660
- GNIS feature ID: 11477

Smoke Signal (Navajo: Łid Néigahí) is a populated place in Navajo County, Arizona, United States.
