= Navajo weaving =

Textile art by Navajo people of the US

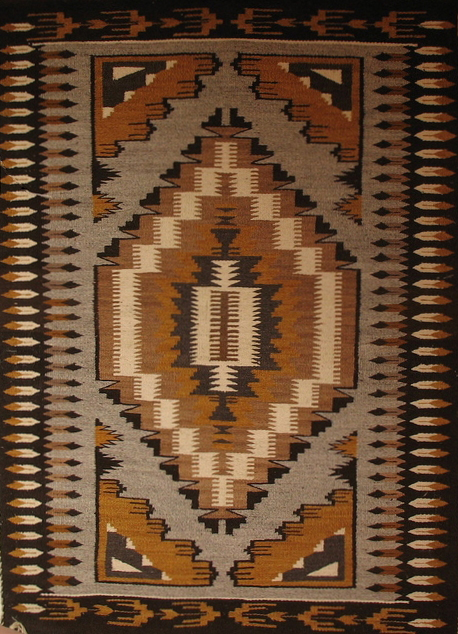
A contemporary Navajo rug

Third phase Chief's blanket, circa 1870–1880

Navajo weaving (Navajo: diyogí) are textiles produced by Navajo people, who are based near the Four Corners area of the United States. Navajo textiles are highly regarded and have been sought after as trade items for more than 150 years. Commercial production of handwoven blankets and rugs has been an important element of the Navajo economy. As one art historian wrote, "Classic Navajo serapes at their finest equal the delicacy and sophistication of any pre-mechanical loom-woven textile in the world."

Navajo textiles were originally utilitarian weavings, including cloaks, dresses, saddle blankets, and similar items. By the mid-19th century, Navajo wearing blankets were trade items prized by Indigenous peoples of the Great Plains and neighboring tribes. Toward the end of the 19th century, Navajo weavers began to make rugs for non-Native tourists and for export.

Earlier Navajo textiles have strong geometric patterns. They are a flat tapestry-woven textile produced in a fashion similar to kilims of Eastern Europe and Western Asia, but with some notable differences. In Navajo weaving, the slit weave technique common in kilims is not used, and the warp is one continuous length of yarn, not extending beyond the weaving as fringe. Traders from the late 19th and early 20th century encouraged adoption of some kilim motifs into Navajo designs. Textiles with representational imagery are called pictorial. Today, Navajo weavers work in a wide range of styles from geometric abstraction and representationalism to biomorphic abstraction and use a range of natural undyed sheep wool, natural dyes, and commercial dyes.

== Purpose ==
Originally, Navajo blankets were used in a wide variety of garments, including (but not limited to) dresses, saddle blankets, serapes, night covers, or as a "door" at the entrance of their homes.

== History ==
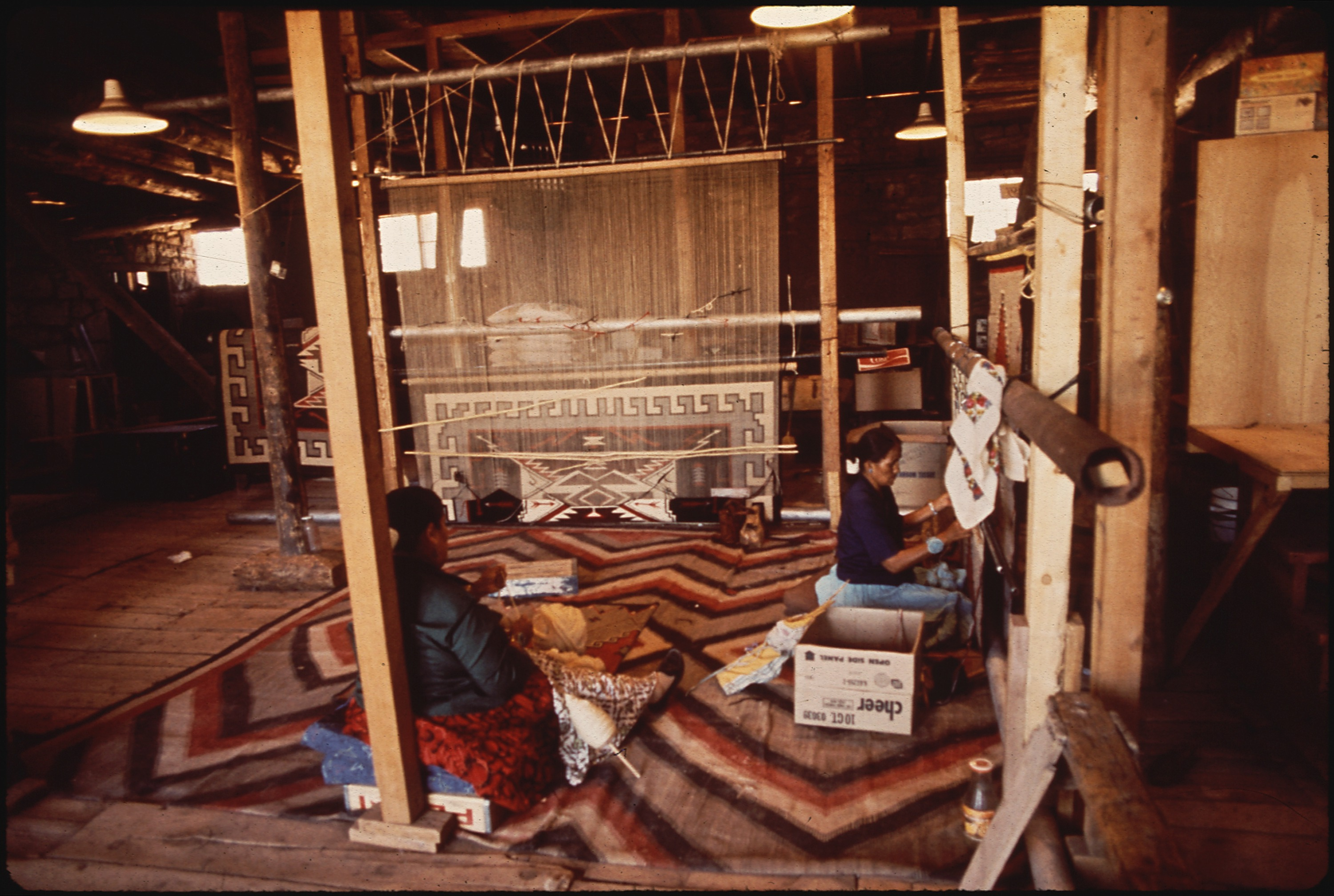
Navajo weavers at work, Hubbell Trading Post, 1972

=== Pueblo influence ===
The Navajo may have learned to weave from their Pueblo Indian neighbors when they moved into the Four Corners region possibly around AD 1000 to 1200. Some experts, including anthropologist J. C. H. King, contend that the Navajo were not weavers until after the 17th century. The Navajo obtained cotton through local trade routes before the arrival of the Spanish, after which time they began to use wool. The Pueblo and Navajo were not generally on friendly terms due to frequent Navajo raids on Pueblo settlements, yet many Pueblo sought refuge with their Navajo neighbors in the late 17th century to evade the conquistadors in the aftermath of the Pueblo Revolt. This social interchange is the probable origin of the distinctive Navajo weaving tradition. Spanish records show that Navajo people began to herd sheep and weave wool blankets from that time onward.

The extent of Pueblo influence on Navajo weaving is uncertain. As Wolfgang Haberland notes, "Prehistoric Puebloan textiles were much more elaborate than historic ones, as can be seen in the few remnants recovered archaeologically and in costumed figures in pre-contact kiva murals." Haberland suggests that the absence of surviving colonial-era Pueblo textile examples makes it impossible to do more than conjecture about whether the creative origins of Navajo weaving arose from Navajo culture or were borrowed from the neighboring people.

=== Early records ===
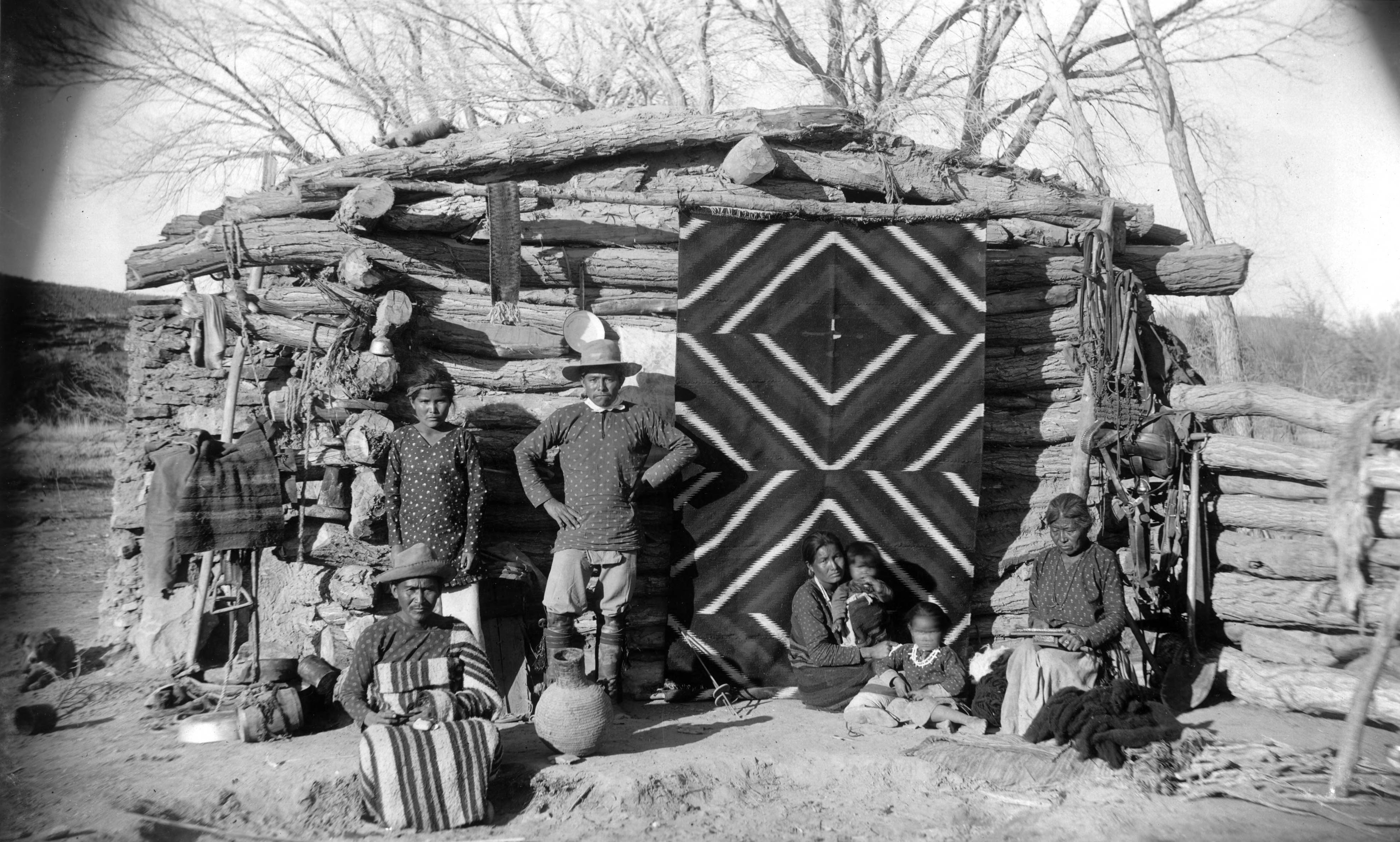
Navajo winter hogan with blanket used as a door, 1880–1910

Written records establish the Navajo as fine weavers for at least the last 300 years, beginning with Spanish colonial descriptions of the early 18th century. By 1812, Pedro Piño called the Navajo the best weavers in the province. Few remnants of 18th-century Navajo weaving survive; the most important surviving examples of early Navajo weaving come from Massacre Cave at Canyon de Chelly, Arizona. In 1804, a group of Navajo were shot and killed there, where they were seeking refuge from Spanish soldiers. For a hundred years the cave remained untouched due to Navajo taboos until local trader Sam Day entered it and retrieved the textiles. Day separated the collection and sold it to various museums. The majority of Massacre Cave blankets feature plain stripes, but some exhibit the terraces and diamonds characteristic of later Navajo weaving.

=== Wider commerce ===
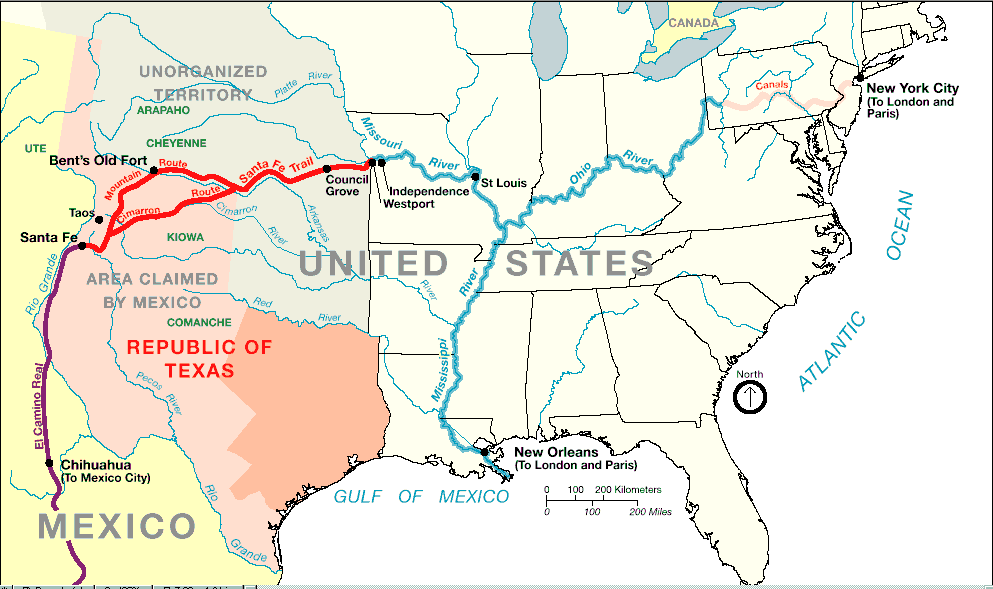
Map of the Santa Fe trail in 1845

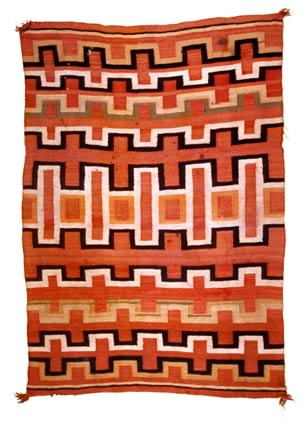
A transitional blanket, woven circa 1880–1885. The thick handspun yarns and synthetic dyes are typical of pieces made during the transition from blanket weaving to rug weaving, when more weavings were sold to outsiders.

Commerce expanded after the Santa Fe Trail opened in 1822, and greater numbers of examples survive. Until 1880, all such textiles were blankets as opposed to rugs. In 1850, these highly prized trade items sold for $50 in gold, a huge sum at that time.

Railroad service reached Navajo lands in the early 1880s and resulted in considerable expansion of the market for Navajo woven goods. According to Kathy M'Closkey of the University of Windsor in Ontario, Canada, "wool production more than doubled between 1890 and 1910, yet textile production escalated more than 800%". Purchases of manufactured yarn compensated for the deficit in wool production. Federal government reports affirmed that this weaving, which was performed almost exclusively by women, was the most profitable Navajo industry during that era. Quality declined in some regards as the weavers attempted to keep up with demand. However, today the average price of a rug is about $8,000.

Traders have been an important part of the economy on reservations, first appearing in the Southwest in 1868. By 1890, there were eight trading posts officially established on Navajo Reservation with unlicensed posts rapidly growing on the outskirts outside of government control. Navajo weaving and jewelry were often used in trading and by the mid-nineteenth century Navajo weaving were popular tourist items.

Several European-American merchants influenced Navajo weaving during the next decades. The first to advertise Navajo textiles in a catalog was C. N. Cotton in 1894. Cotton encouraged professional production and marketing among his peers and the weavers whose work they handled. Another trader named John B. Moore, who settled in the Chuska Mountains in 1897 attempted to improve the quality of textiles he traded. He attempted to regulate the cleaning and dyeing process of artisans who did business with him, and shipped wool intended for higher grade weaving outside the region for factory cleaning. He limited the range of dyes in textiles he traded and refused to deal fabric that had included certain commercially produced yarns. Moore's catalogs identified individual textile pieces rather than illustrating representative styles. He appears to have been instrumental in introducing new motifs to Navajo weaving. Carpets from the Caucasus region were popular among Anglo-Americans at that time. Both the Navajo and the Caucasus weavers worked under similar conditions and in similar styles, so it was relatively simple for them to incorporate Caucasus patterns such as an octagonal motif known as a gul.

Traders encouraged the locals to weave blankets and rugs into distinct styles. Traders influenced weaving designs by suggesting colors, motifs, and supplying new dyes and commercial yarns. They included "Two Gray Hills" (credited to George Bloomfield, Ed Davies, and local Navajo weavers, are predominantly black and white, with traditional patterns), "Teec Nos Pos" (colorful, with very extensive patterns), "Ganado" (founded by John Lorenzo Hubbell), red dominated patterns with black and white, "Crystal" (founded by J. B. Moore), Oriental and Persian styles (almost always with natural dyes), "Wide Ruins", "Chinle", banded geometric patterns, "Klagetoh", diamond type patterns, "Red Mesa" and bold diamond patterns. Many of these patterns exhibit a fourfold symmetry, which is thought by Professor Gary Witherspoon to embody traditional ideas about harmony or Hozh.

While some traders were focused on high quality weavings, other traders only wanted small and hastily made pieces to keep up with the tourist market's demand. This pressure for speeder production of weavings also resulted in a larger reliance on commercially produced yarns and dyes that were viewed as inferior materials. Traders have had a complicated relationship with reformers and attempts to improve Navajo weaving with some embracing it with and others against any loss of control or input from others. Many traders did not think there was a need for improvements and thought that their business was profitable enough and did not support changes to their system.

Navajo weaving has long been a valuable source of family income, with Navajo women occupying a central position in the household and community economies. While a market for Navajo weaving existed, it was widely agreed that weaving had suffered from tourism and commercialization, motivating the efforts of revivalists, activists, philanthropists and government officials. The worsened quality of materials such as non colorfast chemical dyes, reservation traders promoting quantity over quality, and lack of suitable land for grazing due to erosion and encroachment by non-Navajo herders are just some of the causes. Thus there were both private and government efforts to improve Navajo weaving in various ways, from improving wool and dyes available to widening the market for Navajo weaving.

=== Efforts to Improve Navajo Weaving ===
Many of the first efforts in improving Navajo weaving were initiated by reformists and activists. The Friends of Indians (FOI), a reform group that pushed for assimilation saw Navajo weaving as a way for the Navajo to gain economic independence. They pushed for the production of Navajo rugs with traditional methods and material. The Field Matron Program started in the 1890s by the federal government, but supported by the FOI was given instructions in 1900 by the commissioner of Indian Affairs, William A. Jones to help increase Indian arts and craft production, discouraging new material usage and encouraging higher standards of art. Another early effort by female members of the FOI, aimed to support traditional arts and crafts production through both direct and indirect support, including material acquisition, sales and marketing was the establishment of the Indian Industries League (IIL) in 1899. The IIL was involved with efforts to supply better dyes and wool for Navajo weavers including assisting specific field matrons, such as Mary Eldridge.

A trend that continued into the 1920s, due to insufficient government support for improving the quality of Navajo weaving is private philanthropists and group's involvement in projects. The General Federation of Women's Clubs (GFWC) founded in 1980, and made of many women's clubs of middle class white women focused in focused on various progressive causes, but some clubs in the Southwest turned their attention to promoting Native women's self-sufficiency with handicrafts. The GFWC created the Indian Welfare Committee to focus on Native issues as a whole including the promotion of Native arts. One club in Flagstaff, Arizona near Navajo and Hopi lands enthusiastically responded to the GFWC call to improve the market for Southwest Native arts and crafts by displaying Native art in local clubhouses, and filled their entire building with them. The GFWC was also involved with government lobbying towards a more equitable Indian policy. A spokeswoman for the club, Stella M.Atwood championed the importance of Native arts and crafts, partially Navajo weaving. She wrote a 1922 article published in the Survey Graphic aimed at promoting social justice. The GFWC were involved with fieldwork programs in addition to lobbying to meet these goals, dispatching John Collier, the future commissioner of Indian Affairs, as one of their workers. Many members of the GFWC were involved with other activist groups and had connections with others of high social status and means due to their own backgrounds.

As reformists and activists raised awareness of the Native issues, more government involvement occurred. In 1925, the DOI opened the Burke Indian School at Fort Wingate. Later renamed the Wingate Vocational High School (WVHS) in 1936, it was heavily relied on by the Southwestern Range and Sheep Breeding Laboratory, with the goal of breeding sheep with ideal wool for weaving and maximizing mutton production. At WVHS the male students assisted with livestock and labs while female students worked as weavers. The Sheep Lab supplied the school with materials and the weavers helped with experiments involving new materials and methods.

=== New Deal ===
As part of New Deal initiatives, the Indian Arts and Crafts Board (IACB) was created in 1935, with René d'Harnoncourt, an artist and Indigenous arts advocate previously involved with great success in the Mexican folk art revival, becoming the general manager of the board. IACB agents Maria Chabot and Julia Lukas, toured the Southwest and Plains states, focusing on Native handicrafts. They noted extreme differences between the desires of traders and wholesalers in weaving, with some unable to sell vegetable-dyed rugs while others had them in high demand. The IACB also created a certificate of quality for Navajo wool products in 1937, but there was resistance from traders and wholesalers over what was included on the certificates along with their price. It was unpopular and only 9 traders were still using the certificates in 1945 outside of the Navajo Arts and Crafts Guild. The IACB successfully advocated for an exception from the War Production Board Restrictions on Wool Products in 1941 for Navajo weavers, reducing some of the restrictions on the sale and production of Navajo rugs during World War II.

Many large scale exhibitions happened under the New Deal arranged by the IACB, such as the San Francisco Golden Gate Exposition in 1939. It included an Indian Court and natural dye displays that educated fairgoers and the public on uses for Native handicrafts. Another extremely popular exhibition was in the Museum of Modern Art in 1941, where the exhibit, Indian Art of the United States took up all 3 floors of the museum and drew 1,343 visitors daily. Navajo weavings were displayed in 2 different parts of the museum, including contemporary textiles made by weavers participating in programs focused on improving Navajo weaving by returning to old materials and designs.

=== Recent developments ===
Large numbers of Navajo continue to weave commercially. Contemporary weavers are more likely to learn the craft from a Dine College course, as opposed to family. Contemporary Navajo textiles have suffered commercially from two sets of pressures: extensive investment in pre-1950 examples and price competition from foreign imitations. Modern Navajo rugs command high prices.

The Navajo Arts and Crafts guild was formed in 1941 with help from the government's Indian Arts and Crafts Board (IACB). It followed previous models like the Museum of Modern Art exhibit, with general manager Adair arranging exhibitions of handcrafts at museums and fairs. By May 1944, the guild had their own trademark, used in tandem with the IACB's certificate of authenticity to guarantee the superior quality and legitimacy of their handicrafts. The guild gave Navajos an alternative to traders at trading posts, resulting in opposition from traders and attempts to intimidate weavers into selling only to them or risk losing the credit system. The guild was able to use knowledge from previous projects on improving Navajo weaving and was proof of the viability of tribally run cooperative enterprises with the government. The guild was also integral in breaking the trader's hold on the Navajo economy.

== Construction ==
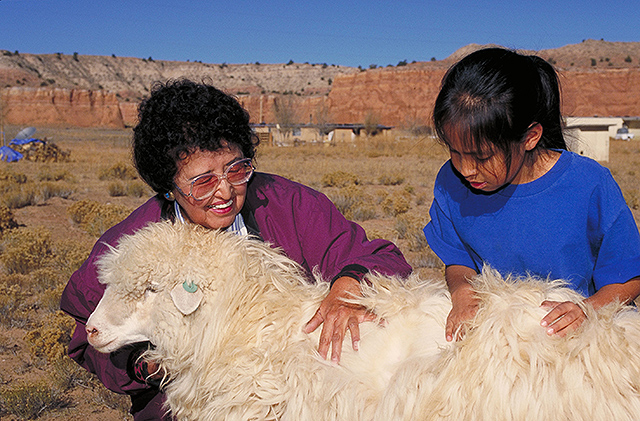
A Navajo woman shows the long, dense wool of a Navajo-Churro ewe to a Navajo girl.

=== Wool and yarn ===
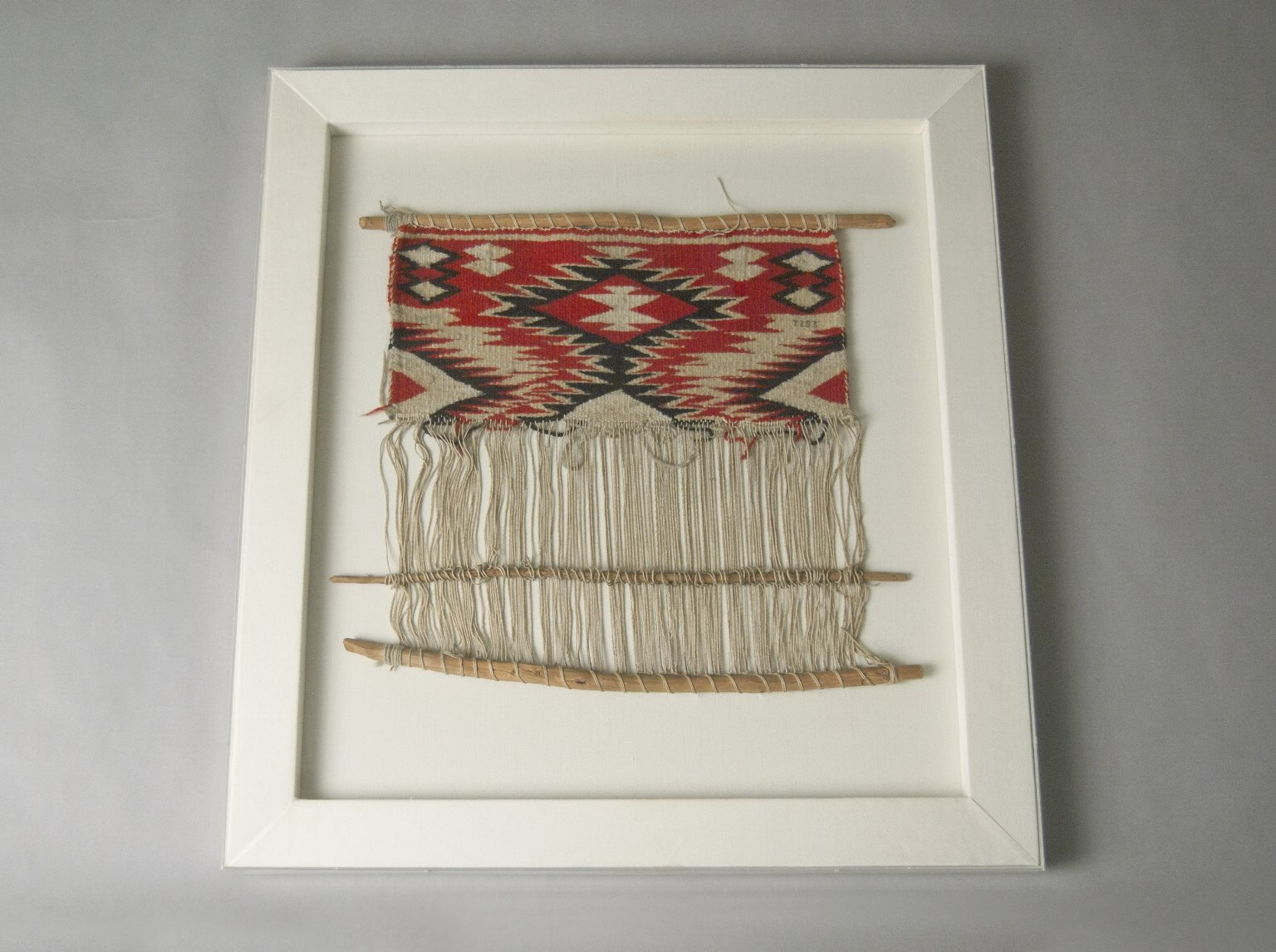
Model of Navajo Loom, late 19th century, Brooklyn Museum

In the late 17th century, the Navajo acquired the Iberian Churra, a breed of sheep, from Spanish explorers. These animals were developed into a unique breed by the Navajo, today called the Navajo-Churro. These sheep were well-suited to the climate in Navajo lands, and that produced a useful long-staple wool. Hand-spun wool from these animals was the main source of yarn for Navajo blankets until the 1860s, when the United States government forced the Navajo people to relocate at Bosque Redondo and seized their livestock. Before their removal, the early weaving practice was such that unprocessed wool was chiefly used to make blankets and which still retained its lanolin and suint (sweat), and which could repel water, on the one hand, but which left an unpleasant odor to the finished woolen product, on the other. The 1869 peace treaty that allowed the Navajo to return to their traditional lands included a $30,000 settlement to replace their livestock. The tribe purchased 14,000 sheep and 1,000 goats. Between 1870 and 1900, commercially processed, pre-dyed woolen goods were introduced to the Navajo, which they incorporated in their weaving.

Mid-19th century Navajo rugs often used a three-ply yarn called Saxony, which refers to high-quality, naturally dyed, silky yarns. Red tones in Navajo rugs of this period come either from Saxony or from a raveled cloth known in Spanish as bayeta, which was a woolen manufactured in England. With the arrival of the railroad in the early 1880s, another machine-produced yarn came into use in Navajo weaving: four-ply aniline dyed yarn known as Germantown because the yarn was manufactured in Pennsylvania.

Among the locally produced yarns for Navajo textile, indiscriminate breeding from 1870 to 1890 caused a steady decline in wool quality. Increasing proportions of brittle kemp can be found in well-preserved examples from the period. In 1903, federal agents attempted to address the problem by introducing Rambouillet rams into the breeding population. The Rambouillet is a French breed that produces good meat and heavy, fine-wool fleeces. The Rambouillet stock were well adapted to the Southwestern climate, but their wool was less suitable to hand spinning. Short-stapled Rambouillet wool has a tight crimp, which makes hand spinning difficult. The higher lanolin content of its wool necessitated significantly more scouring with scarce water before it could be dyed effectively. From 1920 to 1940, when Rambouillet bloodlines dominated the tribe's stock, Navajo rugs have a characteristically curly wool and sometimes a knotted or lumpy appearance.

In 1935, the United States Department of the Interior created the Southwestern Range and Sheep Breeding Laboratory to address the problems Rambouillet stock had caused for the Navajo economy. Located at Fort Wingate, New Mexico, the program's aim was to develop a new sheep bloodline that simulated the wool characteristics of the 19th-century Navajo-Churro stock and would also supply adequate meat. The Fort Wingate researchers collected old Navajo-Churro stock from remote parts of the reservation and hired a weaver to test their experimental wool. Offspring of these experiments were distributed among the Navajo people. World War II interrupted the greater part of this effort when military work resumed at Fort Wingate.

The wool produced by the laboratory was in high demand, and by 1940, lab grown wool was the preference for most weavers. Various experiments on wool were run, including a 1939 rug wear test in the cafeteria of a DOI Building in Washington, D.C. John Cooper, the director of the laboratory, pushed for tests of Navajo wool for fine tweed fabric production in 1939, and work on it was continued under the new director James Grandstaff. Grandstaff and McPee of the Bureau of Animal Industry thought that tweed production could open a new enterprise for Navajo weavers and use wool unsuitable for weaving rugs. The Sheep Lab was closed by the USDA in April, 1966, when they were downsizing due to its focus on one cultural group.

=== Coloration ===
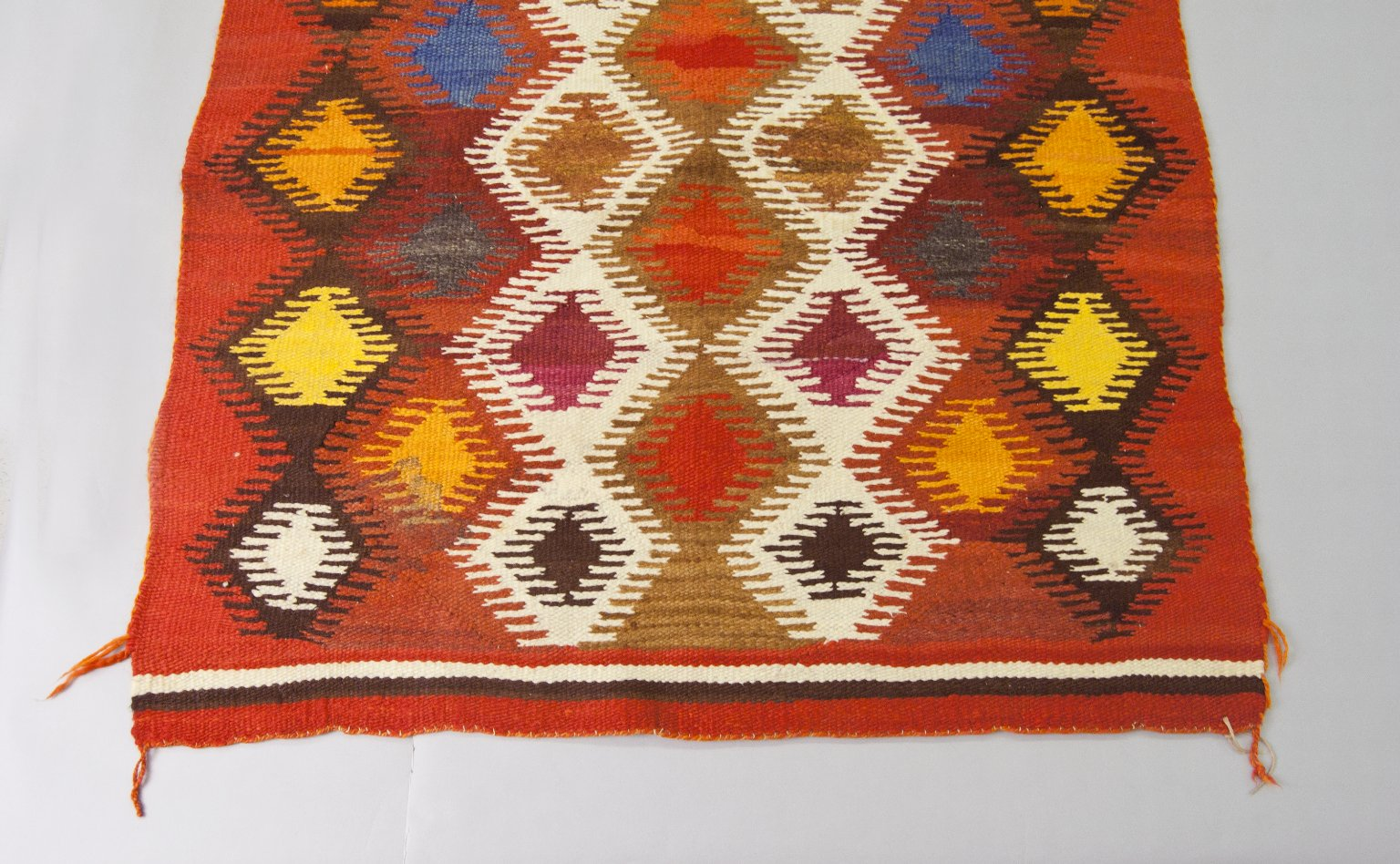
Weaving, mid-19th or early 20th century, Brooklyn Museum

Prior to the mid-19th century, Navajo weaving coloration was mostly natural brown, white, and indigo. Indigo dye was obtained through trade and purchased in lumps.

By the middle of the century, the palette had expanded to include red, black, green, yellow, and gray which signifies different aspects of the earth as defined by different locations of the reservation. Navajo used indigo to obtain shades from pale blue to near black and mixed it with indigenous yellow dyes such as the rabbit brush (Ericameria nauseosa) plant to obtain bright green effects. Red was the most difficult dye to obtain locally. Early Navajo textiles use cochineal, an extract from a Mesoamerican beetle, which often made a circuitous trade route through Spain and England on its way to the Navajo. Reds used in Navajo weaving tended to be raveled from imported textiles. The Navajo obtained black dye through piñon pitch and ashes.

After railroad service began in the early 1880s, aniline dyes became available in bright shades of red, orange, green, purple, and yellow. Gaudy "eyedazzler" weaves dominated the final years of the 19th century. Navajo weaving aesthetics underwent rapid change as artisans experimented with the new palette and a new clientele entered the region whose tastes differed from earlier purchasers. During the later years of the 19th century, the Navajo continued to produce earlier styles for traditional customers while they adopted new techniques for a second market.

=== Weaving ===
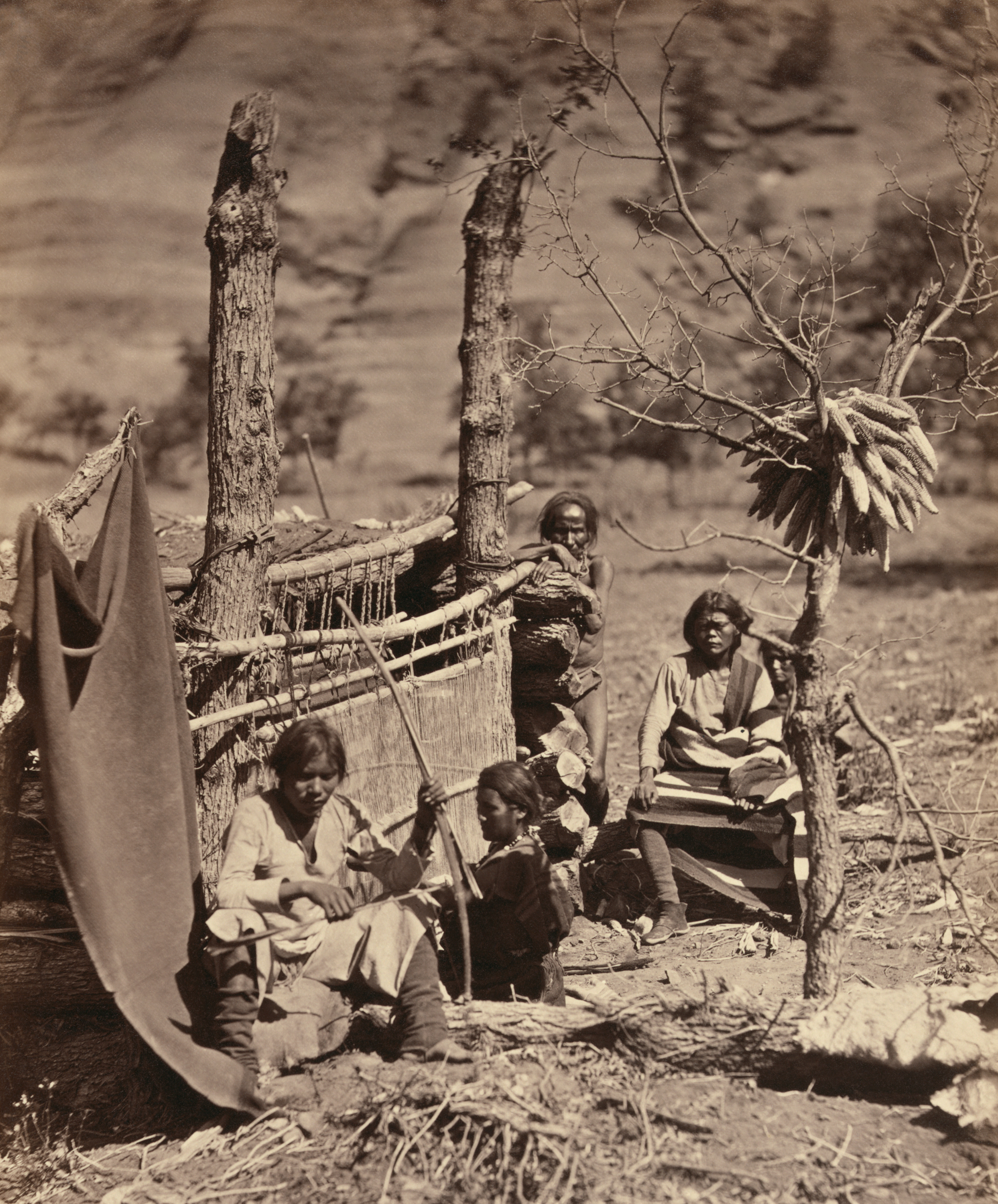
Navajo family with loom. Near Old Fort Defiance, New Mexico. Albumen print photograph, 1873.

Traditional Navajo weaving used upright looms with no moving parts. Support poles were traditionally constructed of wood; steel pipe is more common today. The artisan sits on the floor during weaving and wraps the finished portion of fabric underneath the loom as it grows. The average weaver takes anywhere from two months to many years to finish a single rug. The size greatly determines the amount of time spent weaving a rug. The ratio of weft to warp threads had a fine count before the Bosque Redondo internment and declined in the following decades, then rose somewhat to a midrange ratio of five to one for the period 1920–1940. 19th-century warps were colored handspun wool or cotton string, then switched to white handspun wool in the early decades of the 20th century.

== Position in Navajo religion ==
Weaving plays a role in the creation myth of Navajo cosmology, which articulates social relationships and continues to play a role in Navajo culture. According to one aspect of this tradition, a spiritual being called "Spider Woman" instructed the women of the Navajo how to build the first loom from exotic materials including sky, earth, sunrays, rock crystal, and sheet lightning. Then "Spider Woman" taught the Navajo how to weave on it.

Because of this belief traditionally there will be a "mistake" somewhere within the pattern. It is said to prevent the weaver from becoming lost in spider woman's web or pattern. An example is the spirit line (Ch'ihónít'i), frequently seen in weavings with continuous borders, woven into one corner. This serves as a pathway for spiritual elements to exit the textile safely.

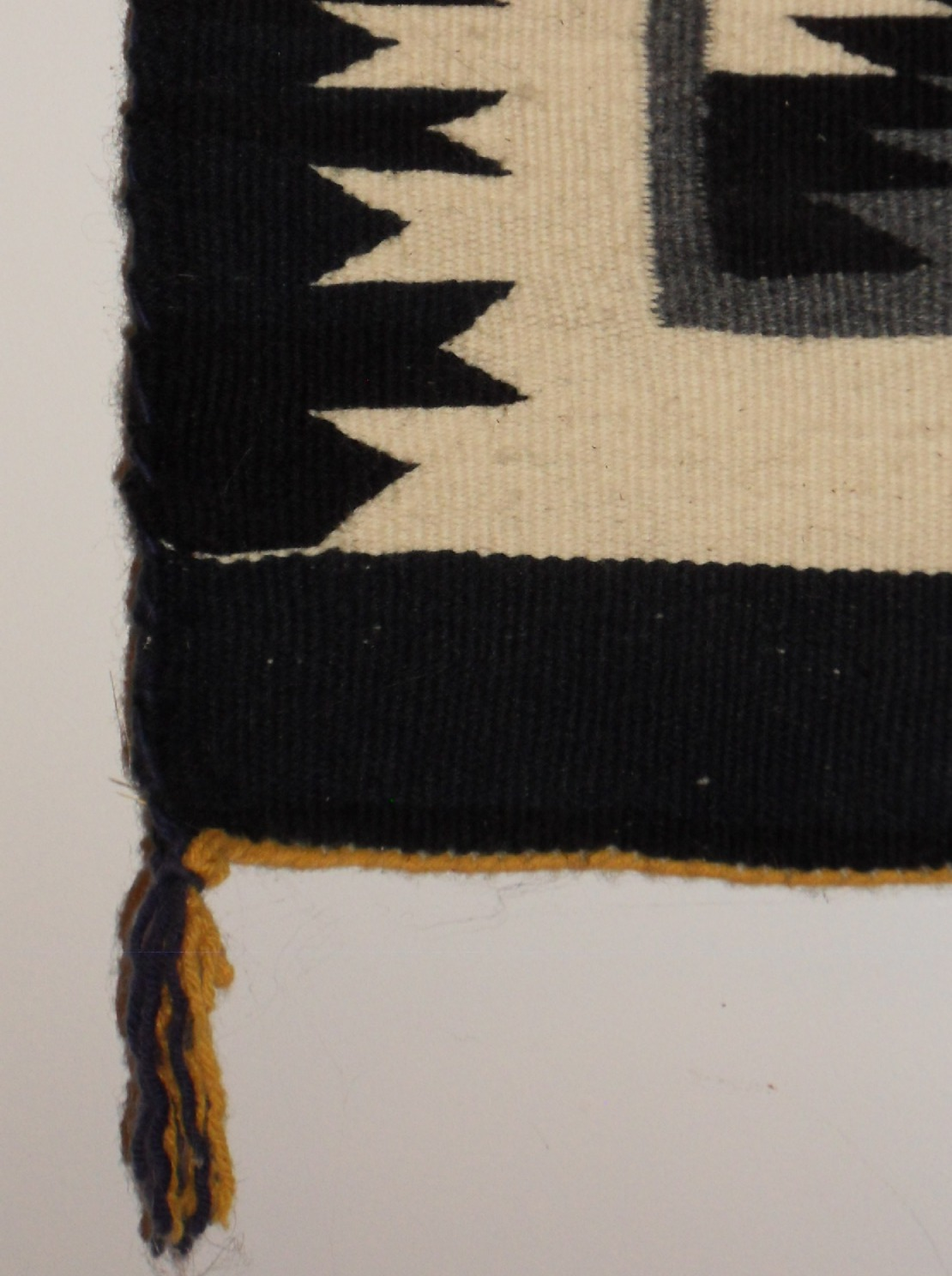
Spirit line through border of a Ganado rug

Use of traditional motifs sometimes leads to the mistaken notion that these textiles serve a purpose in Navajo religion. Actually these items have no use as prayer rugs or any other ceremonial function, and controversy has existed among the Navajo about the appropriateness of including religious symbolism in items designed for commercial sale. The financial success of purported ceremonial rugs led to their continued production.

== Weaving styles and designs ==
- 1st, 2nd, and 3rd phase Chief Blanket
- Ganado
- Two Grey Hills – The Two Grey Hills style is distinguished by its four-fold symmetrical geometric patterns that are often intricate and use only natural wool colors.
- Red Mesa Outline or Eye Dazzler
- Teec Nos Pos
- Klagetoh
- Chinle – Simpler than the Two Grey Hills patterns, using a pallet of yellow and natural wool along with "indigo blue, green, browns, and a petal pink".
- Crystal – These rugs had more "Oriental" design elements, such as hooks and often had decorative borders.
- Burntwater
- Wide Ruins – With "a warm color range, consisting primarily of soft golds, oranges, beiges, and yellows". Influenced by the Lippincotts that owned the trading post.
- Storm Pattern – The Storm pattern style includes a central rectangle or square that represents the centering of place in the universe or at home, and incorporates a broader color palette. This is surrounded by four additional rectangles that represent the four sacred mountains of the Navajo along with zig-zag lightning forms.
- Newlands Raised Outline
- Coal Mine Mesa Raised Outline
- Yei
- Yei be Chei
- Pine Springs – Second trading post owned by the Lippincotts, with similarities to Wide Ruins style with warm tones, but has the addition of soft greens.
- Germantown (old and contemporary)
- Sand Painting or Mother Earth Father Sky
- Spider rock design
- Pictorial Rugs
- Burnham Design
- Eye Dazzler
- JB Moore plate rugs
- Double and Single saddle blankets
- Diamond Twill
- Two Faced
- Blue Canyon

Many of these patterns are handed down from one weaver to the next generation of weavers who live within the same area. Because of this tradition older rugs can be traced back to a geographic location where it was produced.

== Notable people ==
- Elle of Ganado (c. 1850s–1924)
- Juanita Paltito (Asdzáá Tl’ógi) (1845–1910), Chief Manuelito's wife
- Julia Bah Joe (1875–1974)
- Hosteen Klah (1867–1937)
- Barbara Teller Ornelas (born 1954)
- Marilou Schultz (born 1954)
- Martha Gorman Schultz (1931–2025)
- Clara Sherman (1914–2010)
- Daisy Taugelchee (c. 1909 – 1990)

== Critical study ==
Until recently, anthropologists have dominated the study of Navajo textiles. Most historic examples of these works belong to ethnological collections rather than fine art collections, which means items have been exhibited and analyzed with an eye toward normative or average works rather than emphasizing technical or artistic excellence. These priorities have artificially inflated the market value for items of inferior craftsmanship. In general, this tendency has affected most non-European art to some degree.

== Gallery ==
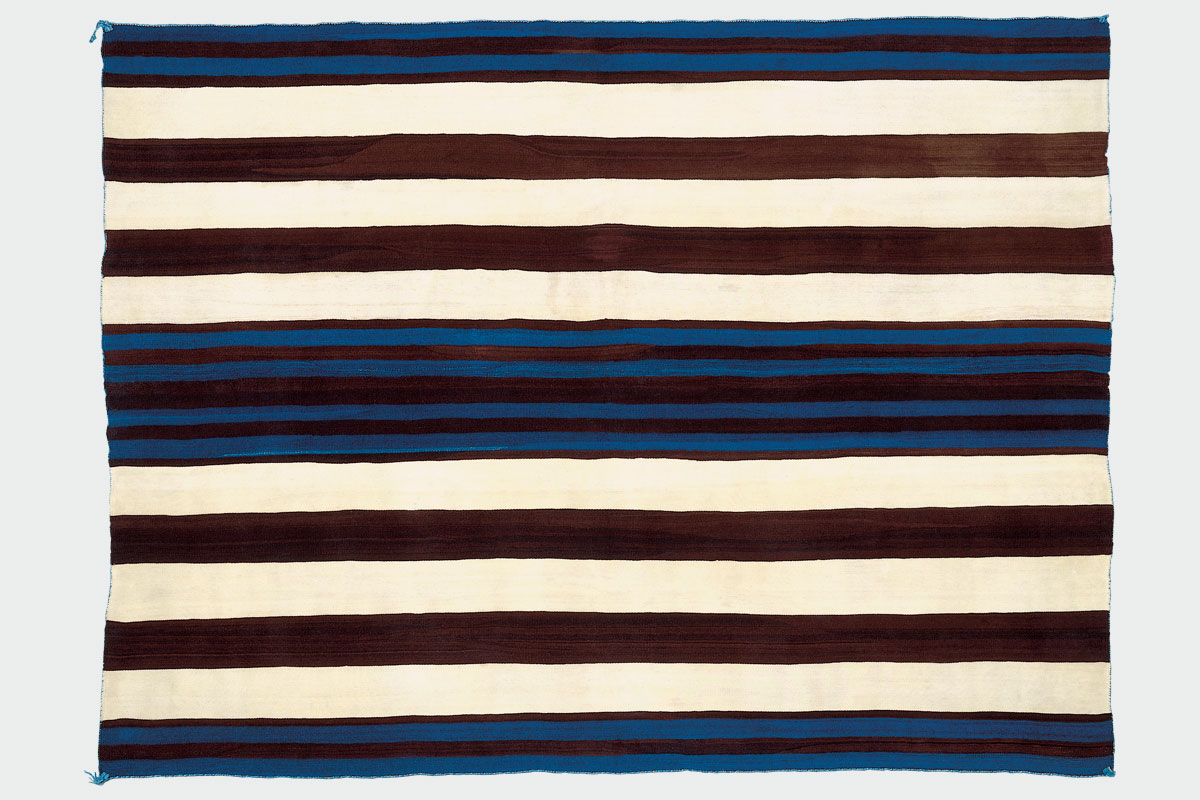
First Phase Navajo Chief Blanket, c. 1840

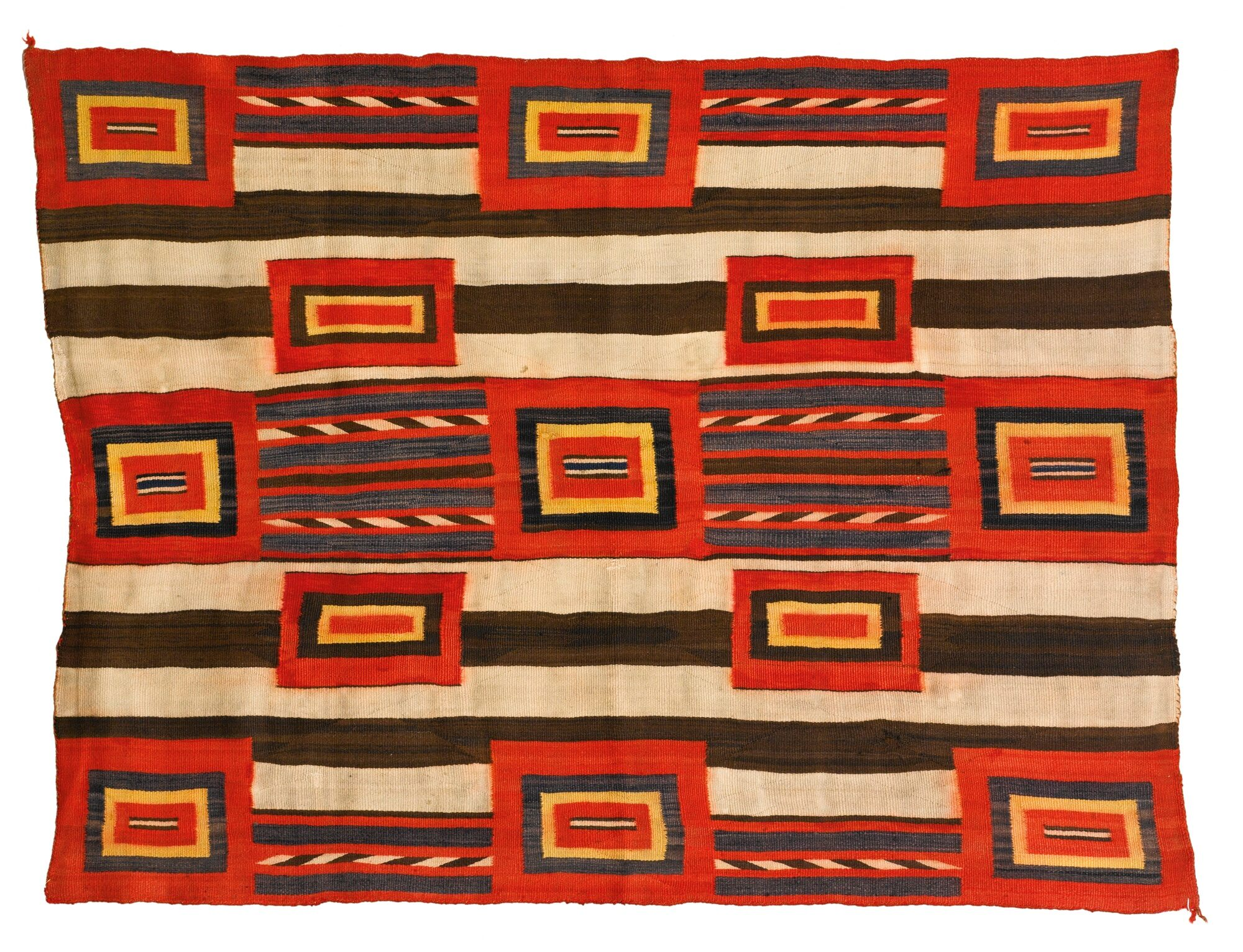
Fourth Phase Navajo Chief Blanket

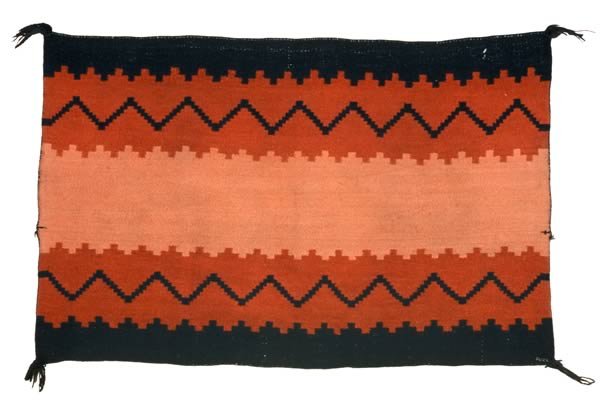
Woman's fancy manta, circa 1865. "Navajo people believe in beauty all around and, here, this weaver is weaving her version of beauty." —Sierra Ornelas, Navajo weaver

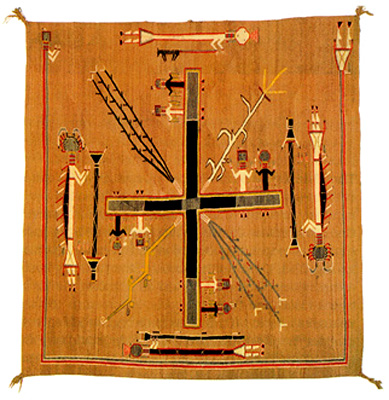
Klah rug

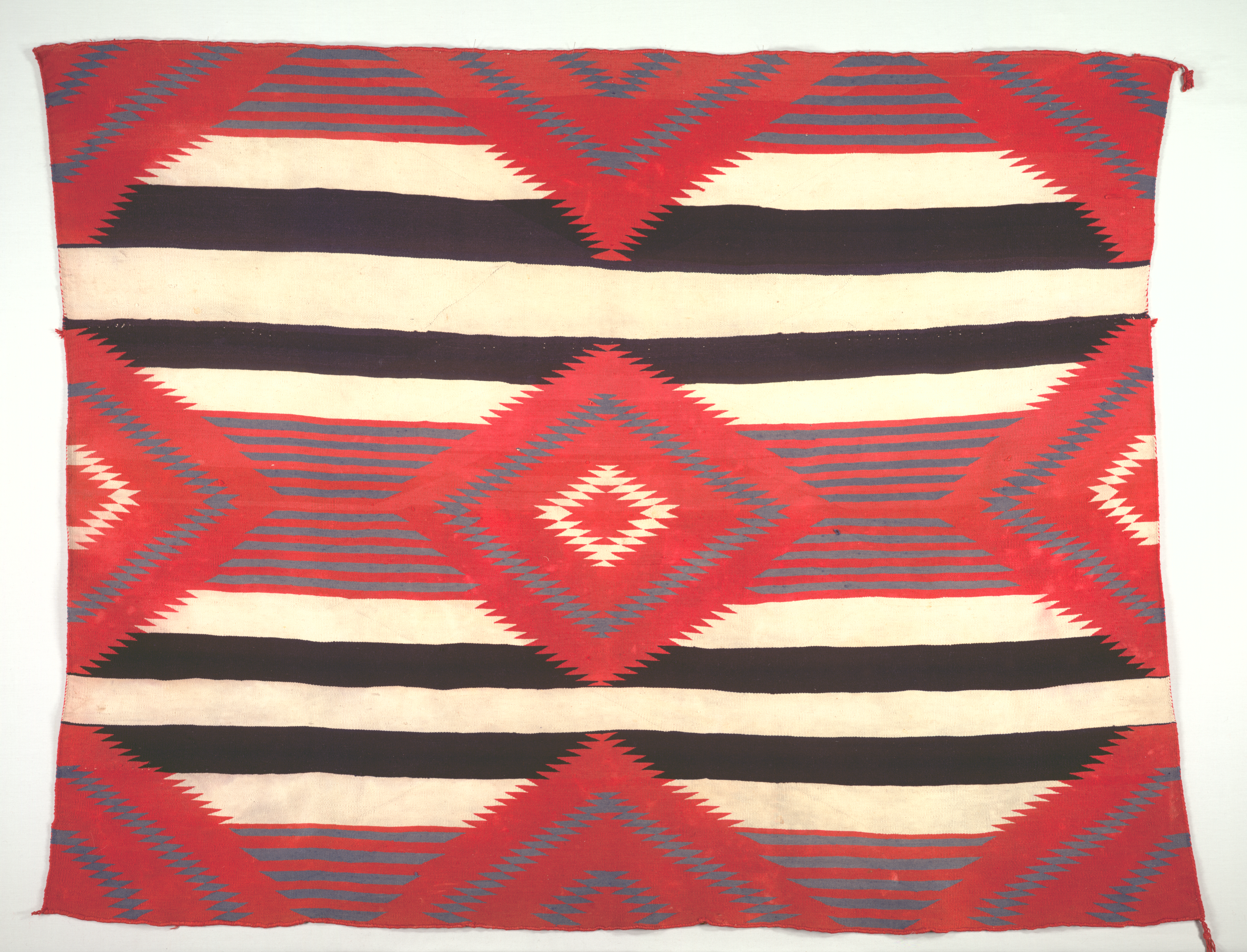
America, Native North American, Southwest, Navajo, Post-Contact, Early Peri - Rug (Third-phase Chief Blanket Style, Germantown Weaving), Cleveland Museum of Art

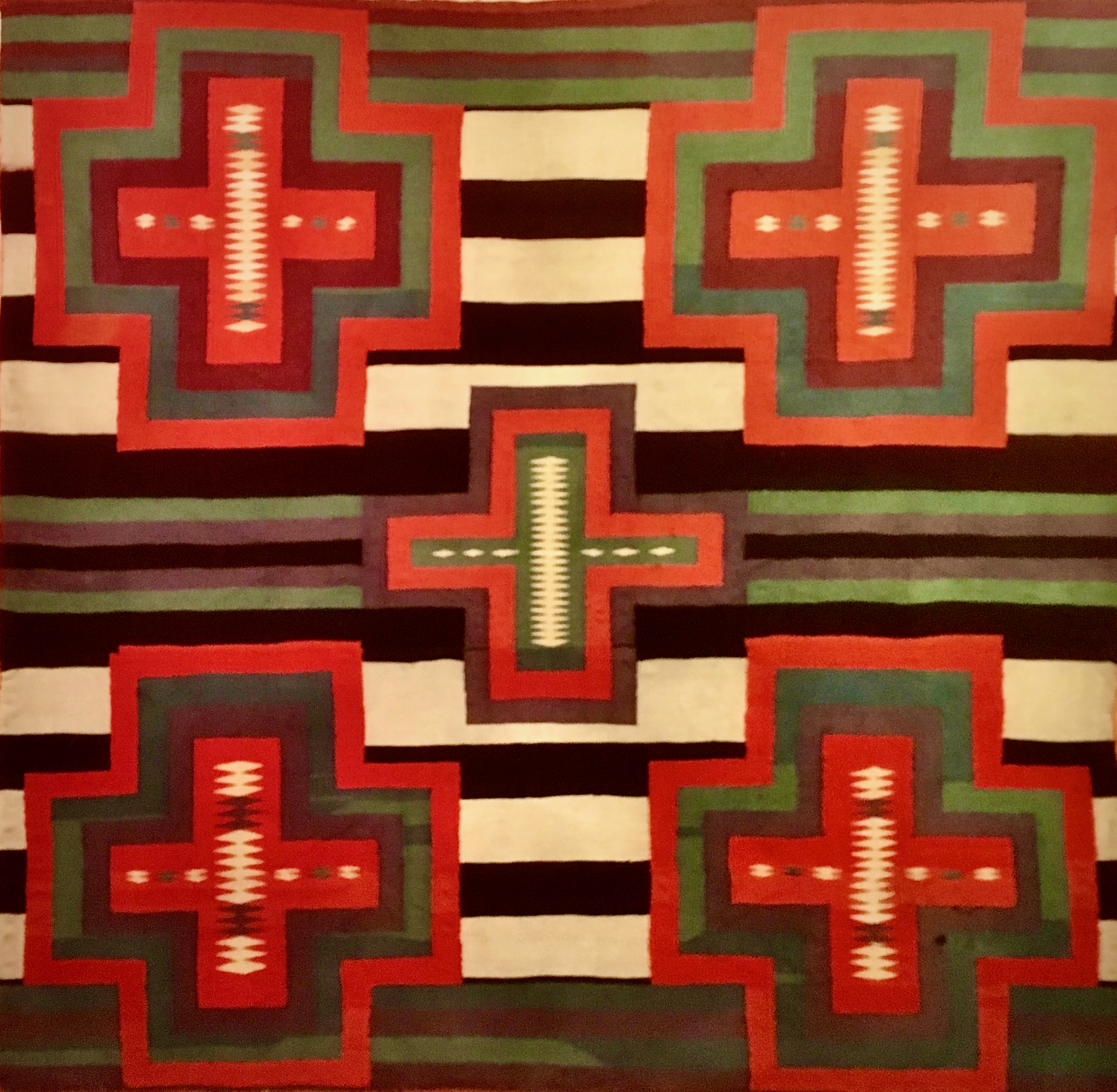
Navajo Third phase wearing blanket, circa 1890–95. Millicent Rogers Museum

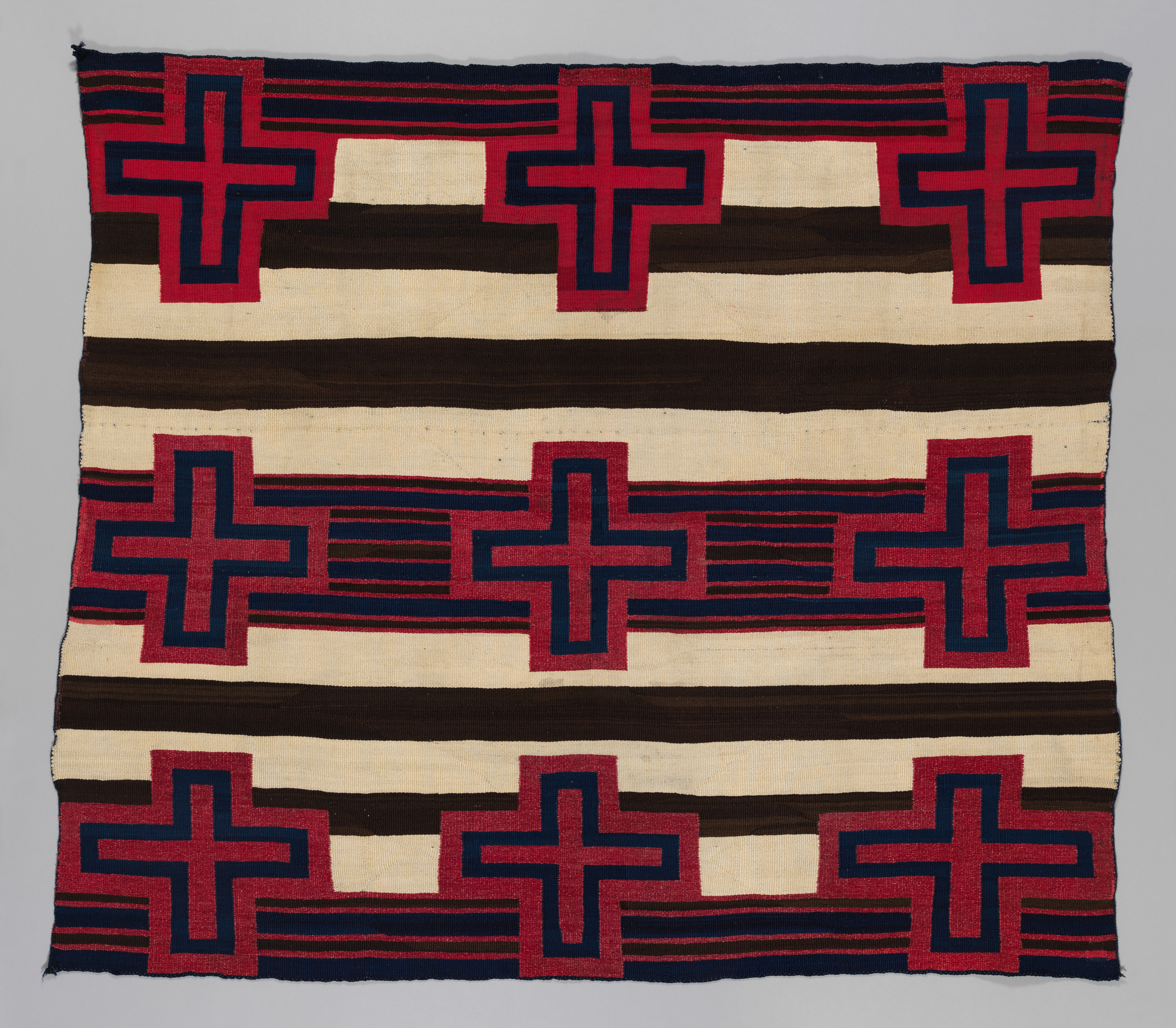
Chief's blanket, Metropolitan Museum

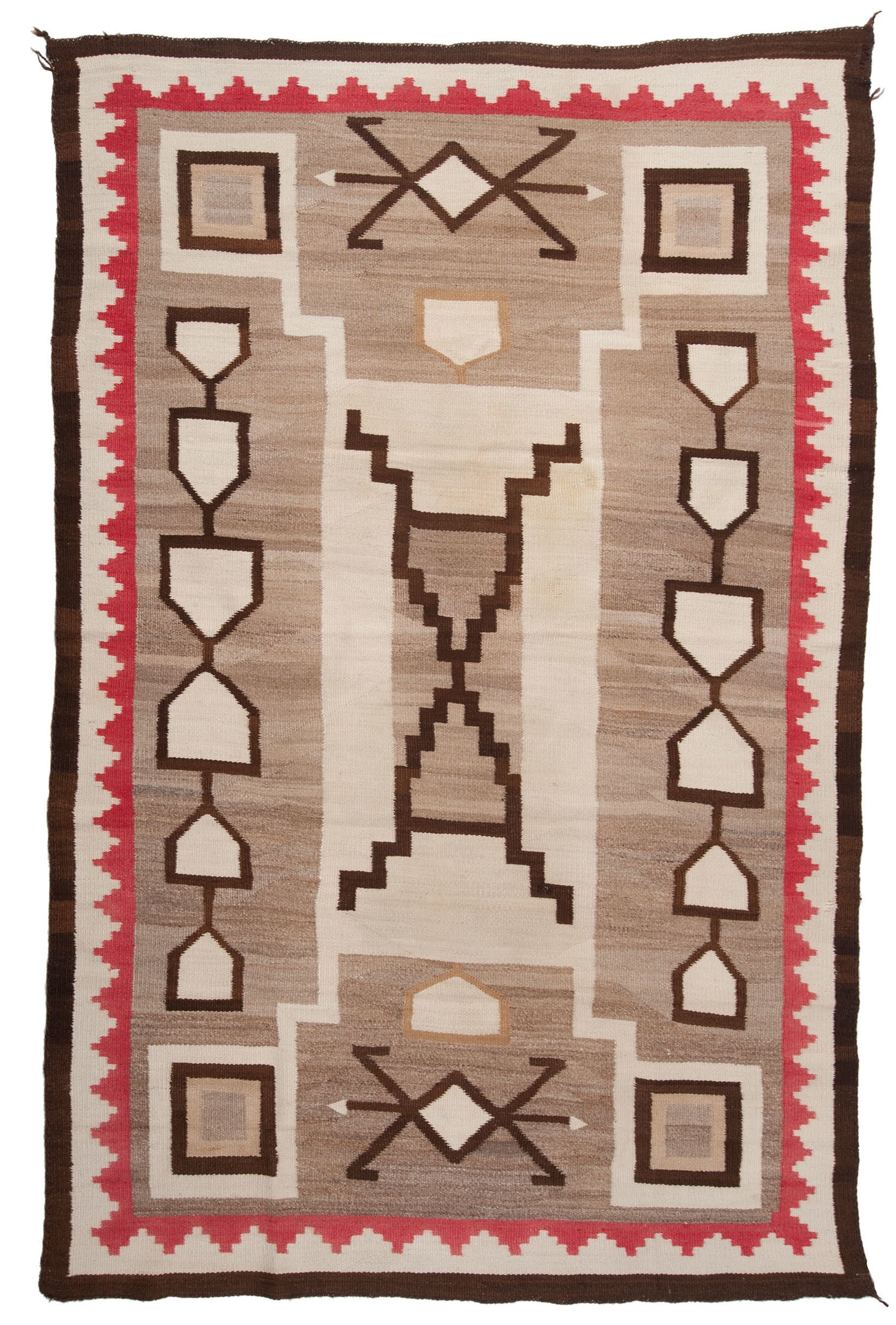
Navajo Storm Rug

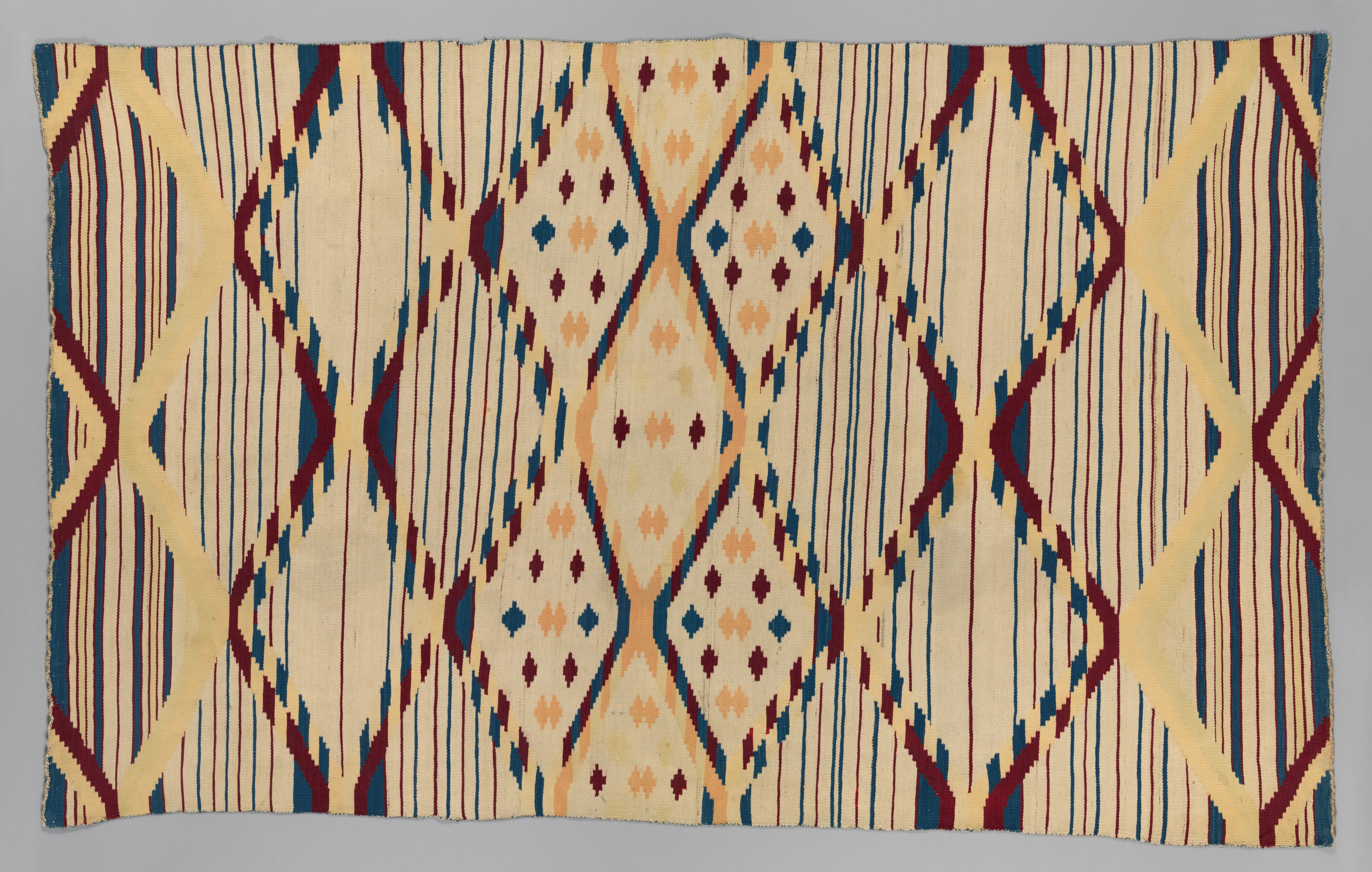
Serape, Metropolitan Museum

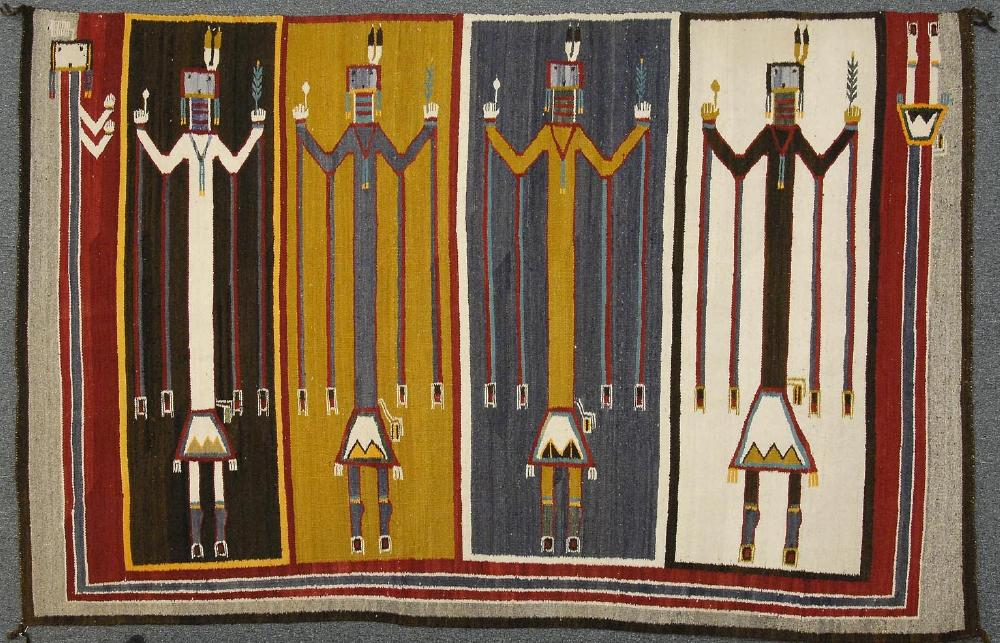
Ye'ii tapestry, Navajo, c. 1920–1930, McNay Art Museum

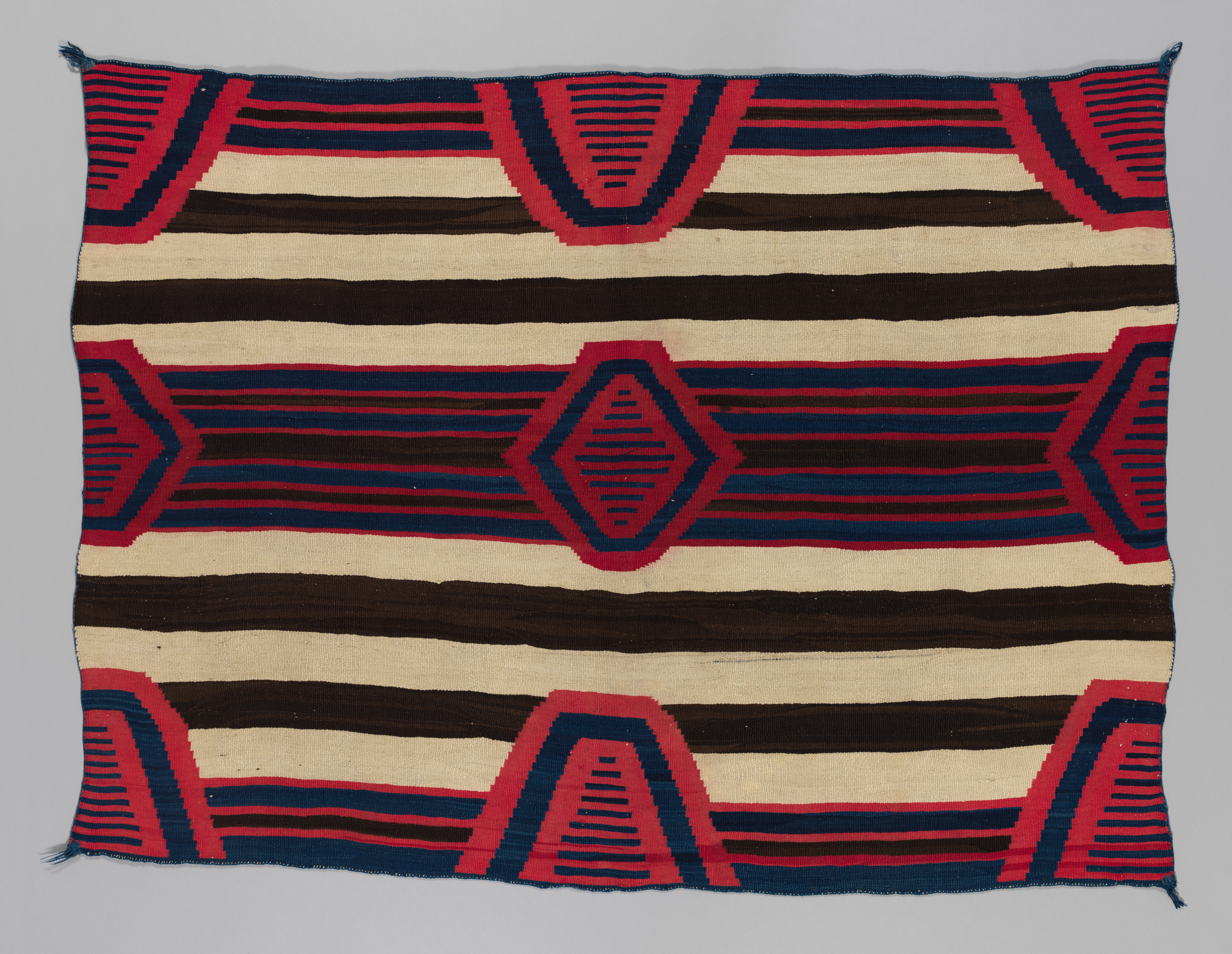
Chief's blanket, Metropolitan Museum

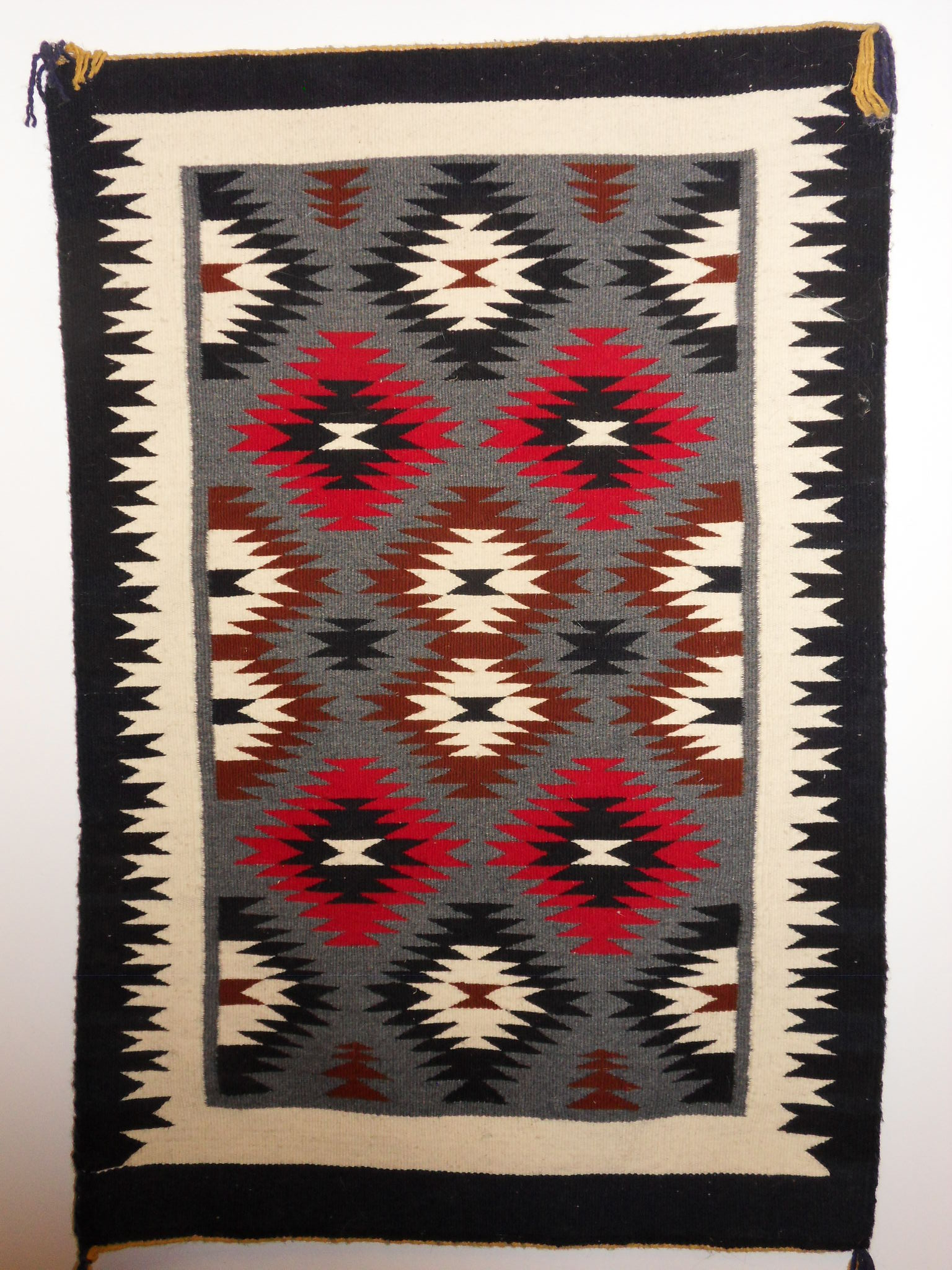
Navajo Ganado rug c. 1975

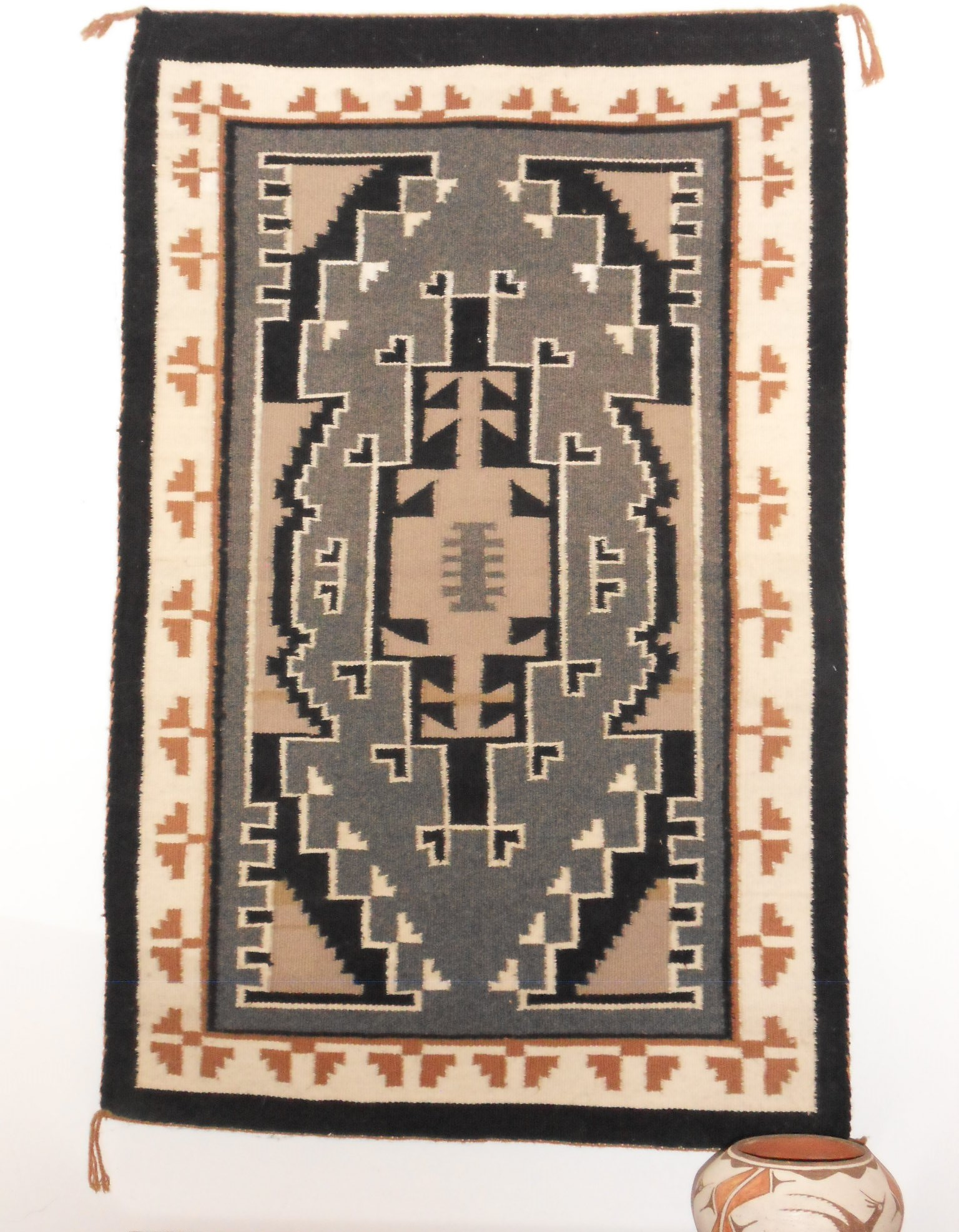
Two Grey Hills rug, c. 1975, natural wood colors and vegetal dye (tan)

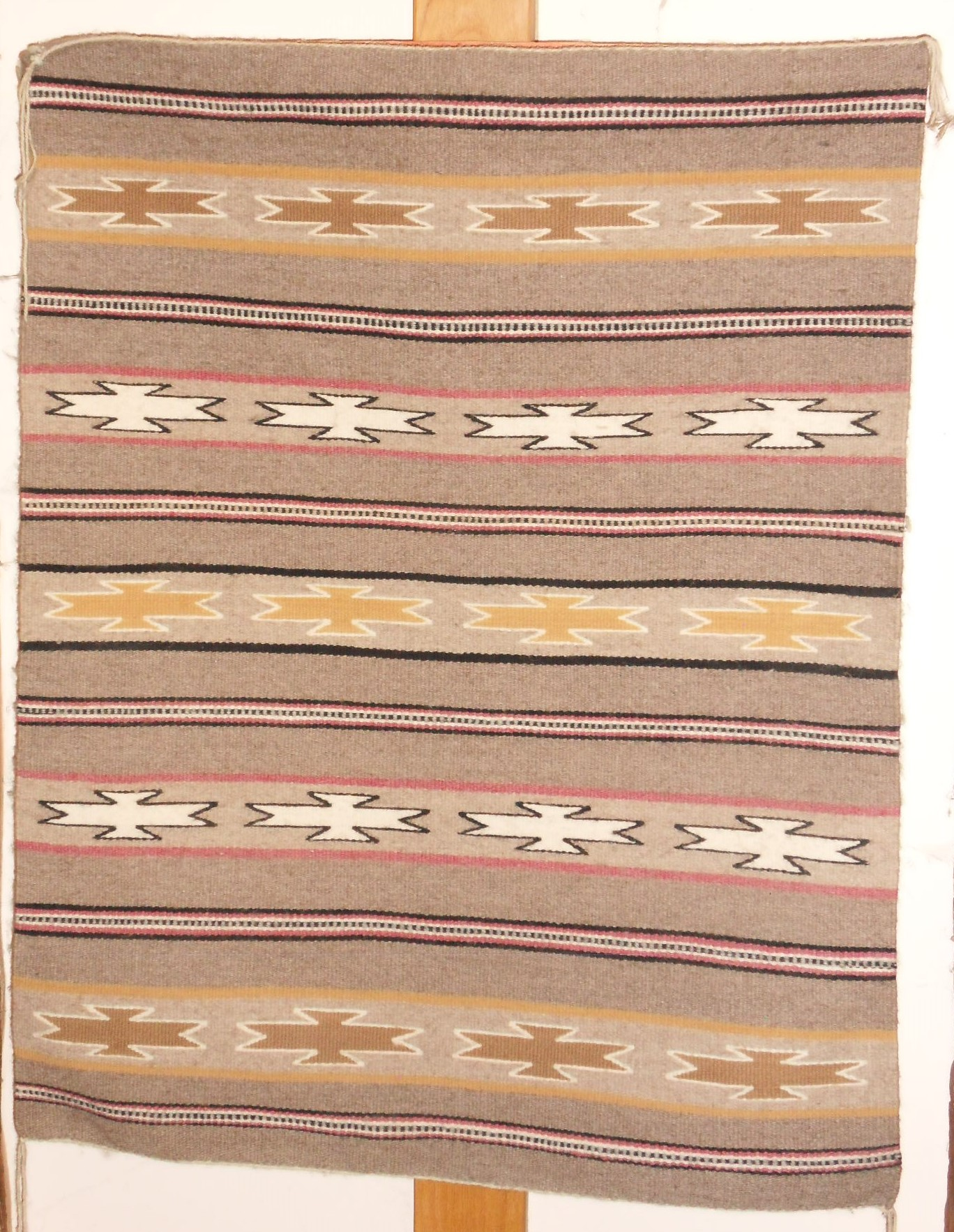
Wide Ruins tapestry 1973, all natural wool and vegetal dyes

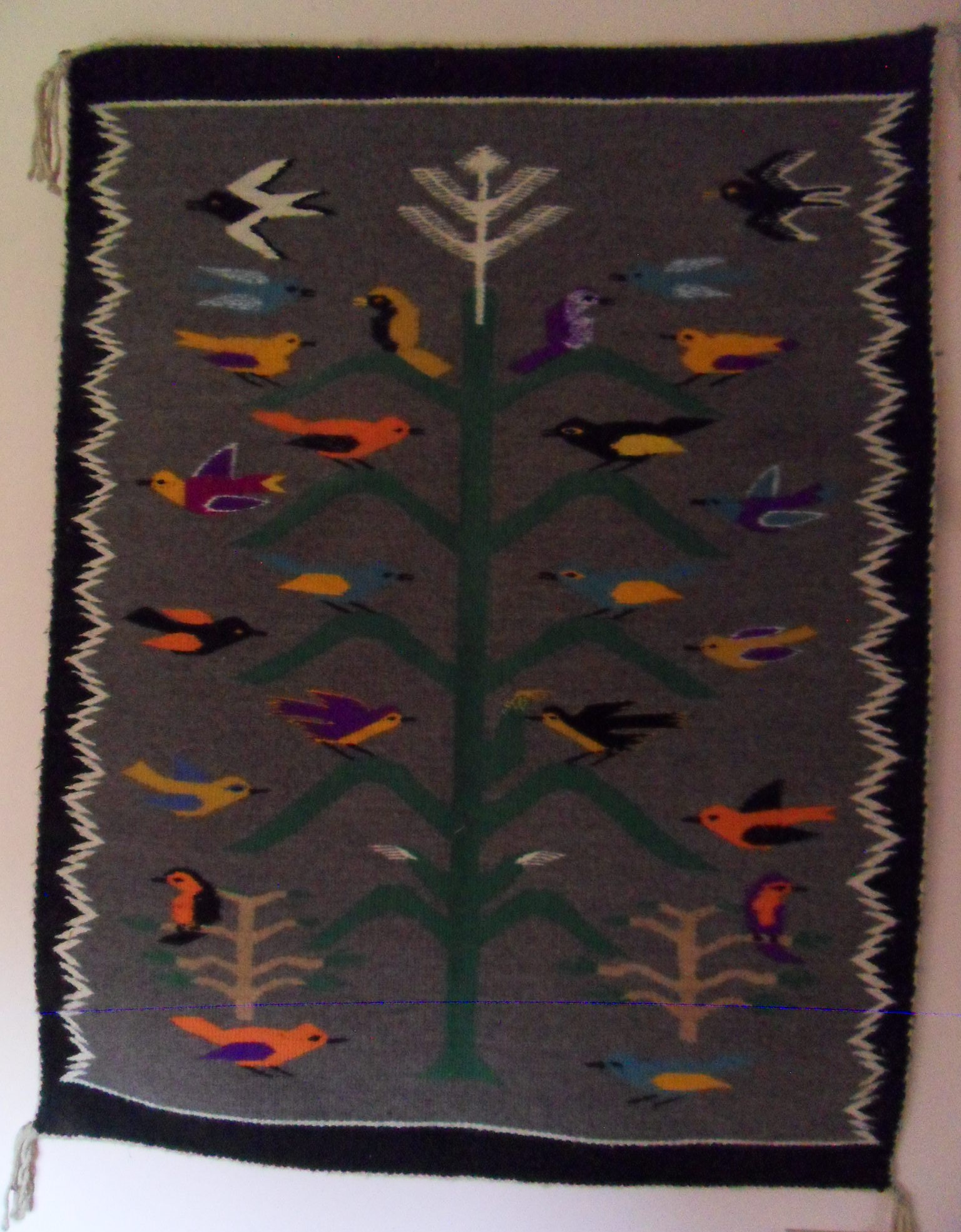
Navajo pictoral rug 1977, by Evelyn Tunney

== See also ==
- Diyogí Tsoh (Big Rug)
- Navajo trading posts
- Tapestry
- Weaving (mythology)

== External links and further reading ==
- Weaving in Beauty – how to identify types of Navajo textiles, weaving classes, articles
- Navajo Nation Arts & Crafts Enterprise
- History of the Navajo Rug, by Navajo Rug Repair Co.
- Towards an Understanding of Navajo Aesthetics, Kathy M'Closkey
- Navajo Weaving at the Arizona State Museum: 19th Century Blankets, 20th Century Rugs, 21st Century Views – an illustrated history, with comments from Navajo weavers and museum curators
- Navajo chief's blankets: three phases, by Douglas Deihl, appraiser
- Shaped by the Loom: Weaving Worlds in the American Southwest – online exhibit of 250 Navajo weavings from the American Museum of Natural History

=== Interviews with individual contemporary weavers ===
- SAR- Navajo Weaver Marlowe Katoney – Contemporary Navajo weaver Marlowe Katoney talks about his art.
- Interview with Navajo Weaver Melissa Cody – Contemporary Navajo weaver Melissa Cody discusses her art and current projects.
