= Frederick Melville DuMond =

American fine-art painter (1867-1927)

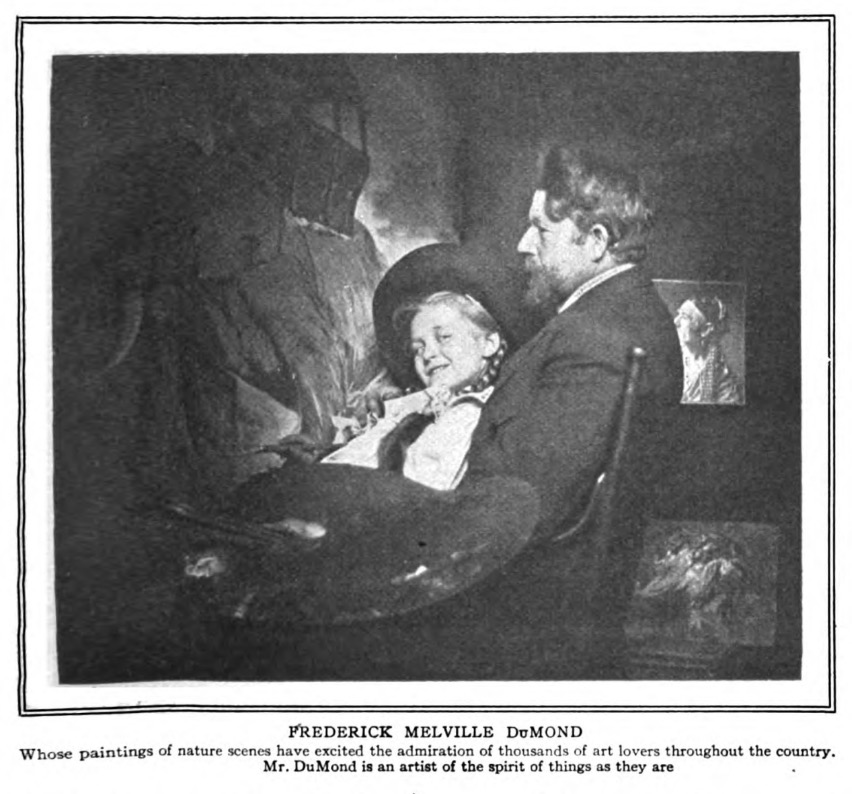
Frederick Melville DuMond with Daughter Camille

Frederick Melville DuMond (July 16, 1867 - May 24, 1927) was an American fine-art painter trained in Paris who worked in a range of themes and styles popular in his time and was seen as both traditional and modern. He also found applications for his art career in illustration, tourism advertising, and entrepreneurial projects. He is known especially for works painted in the American Southwest and California between 1910 and 1924.

== Early life, education, and family ==
Frederick Melville DuMond, born July 16, 1867, in Rochester, New York, was the younger of two sons of Alonzo DuMond, a manufacturer of sheet metal architectural cornices. Frank Vincent DuMond, his older brother, was also a painter. Frederick Melville DuMond began his formal art studies at twenty-one, attending the Académie Julian in Paris along with his older brother, accompanied for the first year by their mother, who kept house in Paris for them. Later, he attended the Beaux-Arts de Paris. He had works shown in many Paris Salons, winning some prizes. He and his first wife, Louise Adele Kerr DuMond—also a painter whom he met at the Académie Julian and who died in her twentieth year—had a son, Jesse William DuMond (1892–1976), who went on to have a distinguished career in physics. Camille DuMond (1900–1986), a daughter by a second wife, Clémentine Theulier DuMond, lived with the artist until his death and was also a painter.

== Career ==
Relocating from France to the United States in 1908, DuMond lived and worked in New York City but struggled to make sufficient income from his art. While there he converted to Christian Science. To extend his career, the artist undertook a series of painting trips in the American Southwest during summers between 1910 and 1914. This period of creativity found special recognition in a show of 34 paintings at the American Museum of Natural History in 1912. By 1910 DuMond had relocated to Monrovia, California, later building an artist's home there that he called Le Château des Rêves, recently restored by its present owners. He painted there and in other Western locations until 1924. During two extended periods between 1924 and 1926, he again painted in France and Italy.

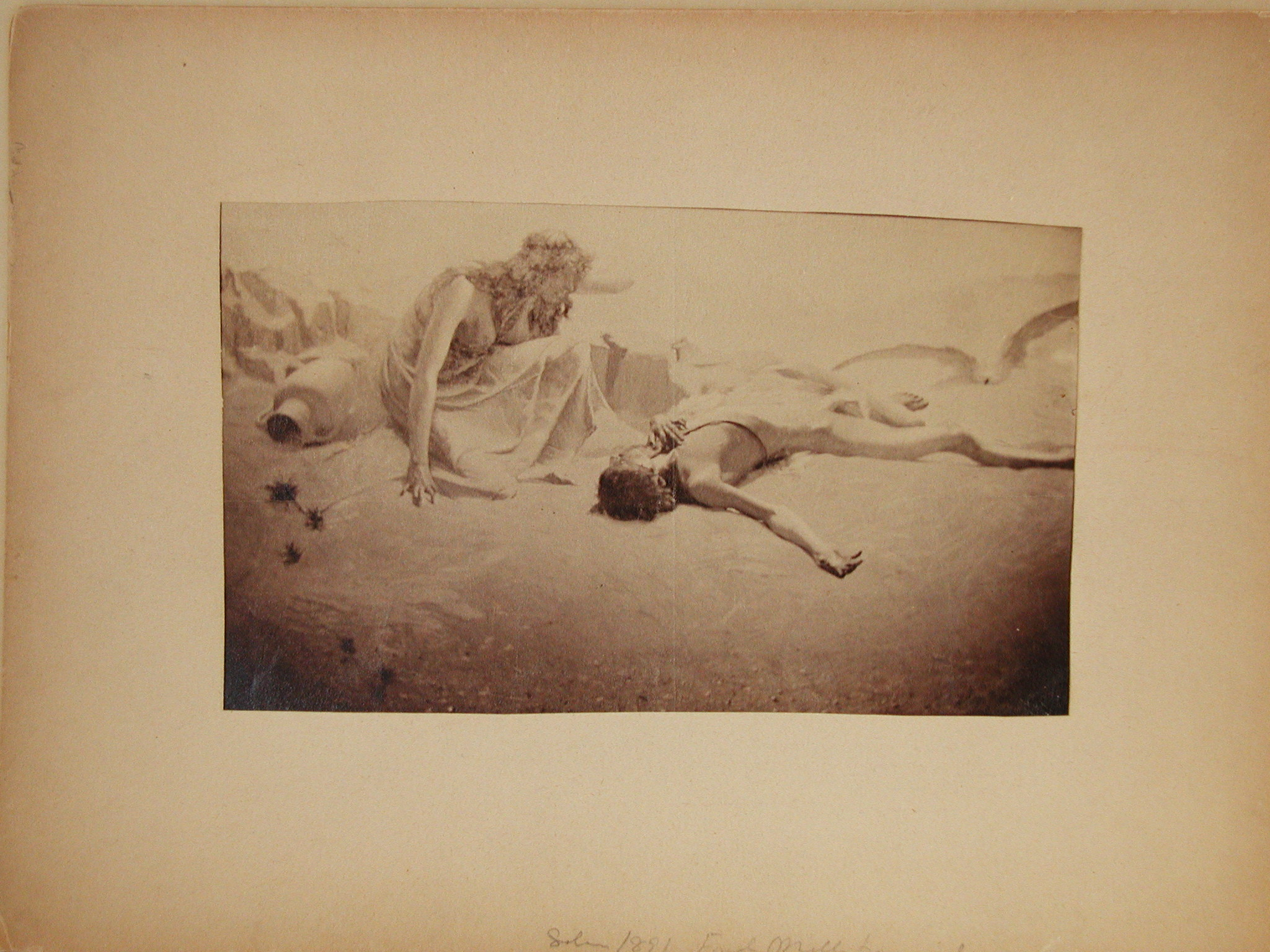
Frederick Melville DuMond "Legend of the Desert" (1894)

== Works ==
=== Academic training and the Genre Feroce, 1889-1908 ===
Under the influence of his academy training and seeking his own special emphases, DuMond painted typically quite large canvases featuring historical/dramatic subjects of considerable action or even violence: Roman amphitheater scenes of animals in combat or animals attacking people. These were attributed to a small movement, the Genre Feroce, so identified by contemporary art critic Sadakichi Hartmann. His Legend of the Desert (1894) features a biblical theme in a symbolist style and was displayed at the celebrated 1893 World's Columbian Exposition in Chicago.

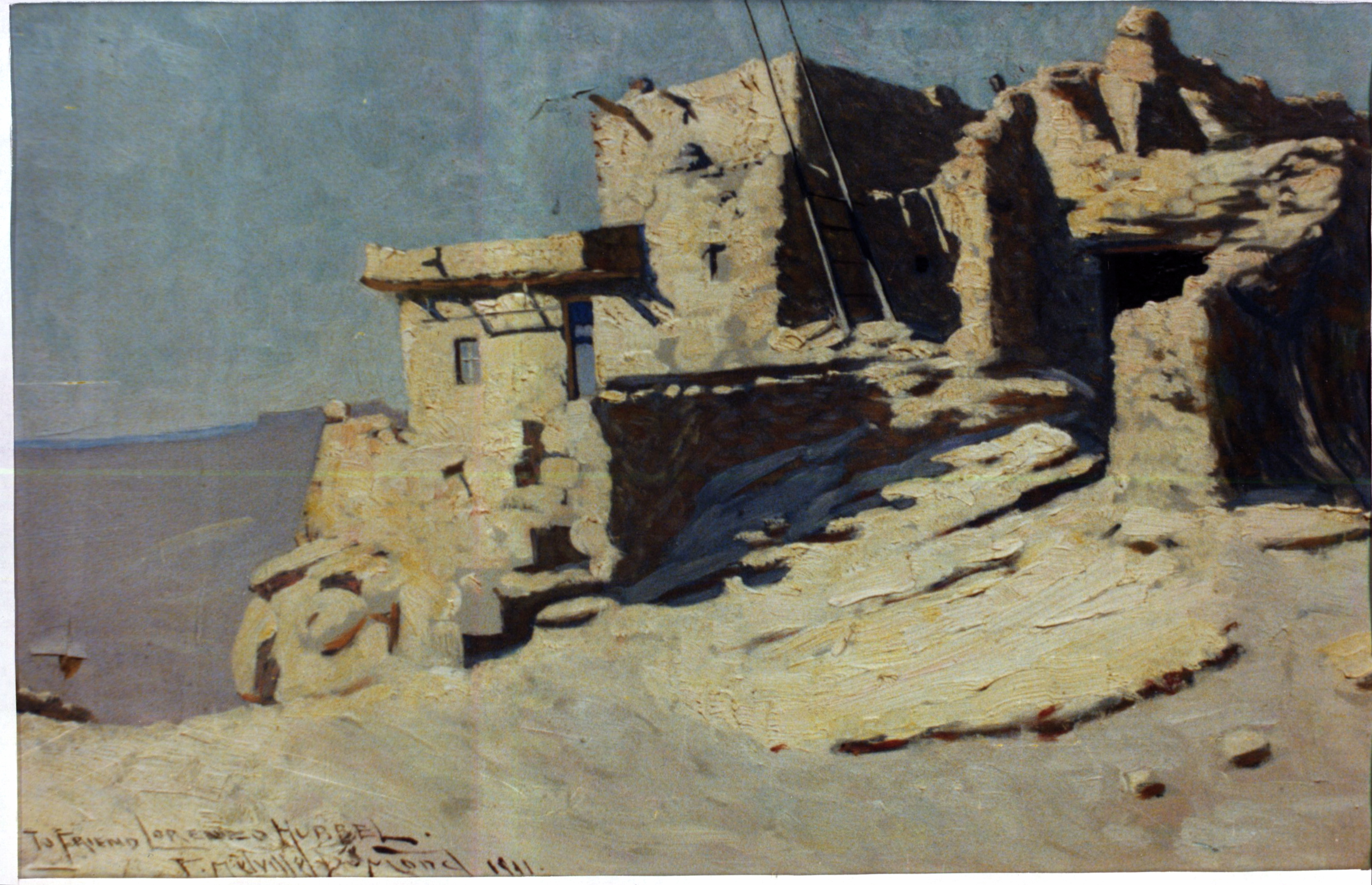
Frederick Melville DuMond's painting "Sunrise at Walpi" (1911)

=== Southwestern paintings, 1910-1924 ===
DuMond is best known for his work of this period, in part due to his own extensive efforts to promote the 1912 show of 34 of his paintings at the American Museum of Natural History. He gave a number of interviews that appeared in newspapers and magazines, one written by noted journalist and aviator Harriet Quimby. He kept a diary of his first southwestern trip and recorded somewhat fictionalized accounts of his painting adventures in two manuscript drafts, one including a tale of lost treasure. A painting trip to the White House Ruin was funded by Lorenzo Hubbell. These accounts formed the basis for a True West Magazine article published after his death. One painting looks out from inside the Mesa Verde cliff dwelling ruins, where the artist camped for a few nights. His painting Sunrise at Walpi (1911) recorded a visit to a still-occupied site.

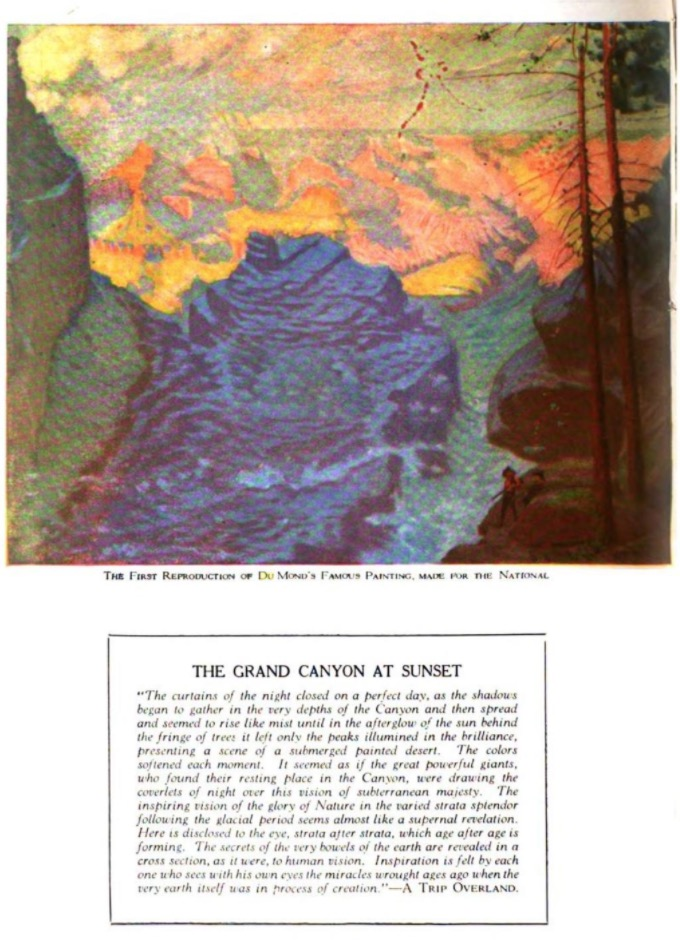
Frederick Melville DuMond "Grand Canyon at Sunset," in "National Magazine" 1915

Frederick Melville DuMond worked in a number of popular art styles, sometimes quoting from others' works—notably, his academy teacher Fernand Corman and American painter William Merritt Chase. He was modern in applying aspects from the decorative arts, especially from muralists, emphasizing design and pattern. While accurate to geology and archeology, his landscapes especially of mountains and native ruins heightened dramatic effects to convey grandeur and spiritual impact. His Grand Canyon paintings were notable for these tendencies and for modern style.

=== Book illustrations and entrepreneurial projects ===
While the artist made his living from sales of his art, he also undertook various projects to make money. Typical of artists of the time, he sold many illustrations to magazines and for published books. In work for the Atchison, Topeka, and Santa Fe Railway and other enterprises, he engaged in tourism promotion, evoking themes of scientific and archeological exploration and celebration of the vanishing west. He became a founding member of the art colony at Laguna Beach, California, receiving a prime lot at Arch Beach Heights in exchange for four paintings that the promoters used for billboards. DuMond assisted his brother Frank Vincent DuMond in some art projects, notably the illustrations to Mark Twain's 1896 novel Personal Recollections of Joan of Arc, in co-teaching and co-directing summer schools for young American artists, and in painting especially the animals for the 1915 Panama-Pacific Exposition murals. The artist proposed to do a panorama of the Grand Canyon and to build a hotel in the Los Angeles hills modeled on ancient Indian ruins

== Last years ==
In late 1924 and early 1925, seeking new inspiration after his years in the American West, Frederick Melville DuMond decided to relocate to France or Italy. He obtained a studio in Florence, Italy, and Camille undertook singing lessons there. They returned to California upon news of his mother's illness in May, 1925, but her condition improved and they were able to return to Europe. Early in 1926 the artist again returned to California, learning that his mother was seriously ill. She died in May, and the artist remained to settle her affairs. Unexpectedly, on May 24, 1927, just short of his sixtieth birthday, Frederick Melville DuMond himself died. The Paris Salon had just hung his late work, The Dawn, and his son Jesse attached a memorial wreath to it there.

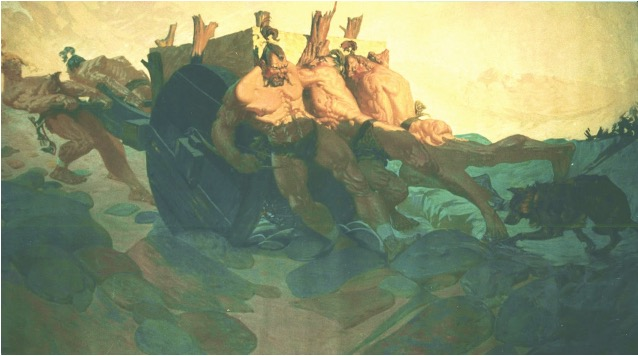
Frederick Melville DuMond's oil painting, "The Dawn" (1927)

== Collections and exhibitions ==
DuMond's work is in the permanent collections of the following institutions:

- UCI Jack and Shanaz Langson Institute and Museum of California Art
- Los Angeles County Museum of Art
- Hubbell Trading Post National Monument, Arizona
- Atchison, Topeka, and Santa Fe Railroad

DuMond's exhibitions include:

- Paris Salons, twenty-one works between 1889 and 1908; one work in 1927
- Columbian Exposition, Chicago, 1893 — Legend of the Desert (gold medal)
- Pennsylvania Academy of the Fine Arts, 1894, 1900, 1901
- Wanamaker's Store, Philadelphia, 1894
- Blanchard Gallery, Los Angeles, June–July, 1907, and May–June, 1908
- American Museum of Natural History, March 9–23, 1912 — 34 works painted in the southwest, hung in the West assembly room
- Santa Fe Railroad, Spring Street Office Gallery, Los Angeles, 1909 and 1910
- Portland Art Association and the Museum of History, Science, and Art, Exposition Park, Los Angeles, 1914-1915 — Paintings by artists who had contributed to the murals at the 1915 Panama-Pacific International Exposition, including ten works by F. M. DuMond.
