= Jesse DuMond =

American physicist

Jesse William Monroe DuMond (July 11, 1892 – December 4, 1976) was an American experimental physicist. He worked at the National Bureau of Standards and later at Caltech where he was involved in experimental approaches to establish accurate measurements of a number of physical constants including the mass and charge of the electron, and the Planck constant.

== Biography ==
DuMond was born in France as a US citizen, as both of his parents were American. His father was landscape painter Frederick Melville DuMond (1867 - 1927), and his paternal uncle was painter Frank DuMond (1865 – 1951). His mother Louise Adele Kerr died when he was aged two, and young DuMond was taken care of by his maternal grandmother in Paris until the age of seven. He then came to the US to live with his paternal grandparents in Rochester who designed and manufactured sheet-metal architectural cornices.

DuMond studied at Monrovia High School, where his grandparents moved, and then went to the Throop College of Technology (later to become Caltech), earning his bachelor's degree in 1916 with the construction of a calculating machine, a "harmonic analyzer". For his master's thesis he built a calculating machine for complex numbers. During World War I, he was employed (1917–1918) at General Electric as an electrical engineer, working on determining the distance of artillery via the recoil displacement. He then served in France in the Second Battalion, Twenty-ninth Engineers, as a sound ranger, coming under fire but not in direct combat; his commander was Theodore Lyman IV, well-known American physicist. In 1919–1920 he was at the Thomson-Houston Company in Paris, and 1920–21 at the National Bureau of Standards, where he worked on ballistics. Returning to graduate school at the California Institute of Technology, in 1929 he received his doctorate in physics. He spent the rest of his career at Caltech, originally at the invitation of Robert Millikan. From 1938 he was an Associate Professor and from 1946, a professor. He retired in 1963.

DuMond became a Fellow of the American Physical Society in 1931. He was elected to the National Academy of Sciences in 1953.

== Work ==
Starting with his Ph.D. dissertation, DuMond became famous for investigating the line broadening in the Compton effect due to the speed distribution of the electrons in the atom. To this end, he developed a new type of X-ray spectrometer with several crystals and also had the original idea for X-ray spectrometers with curved crystal surfaces. Characteristically, he built his measuring equipment himself, often demonstrating great mechanical and geometrical skill. Later he dealt with the precise determination of fundamental physical constants, such as the Planck constant and the electron charge. He found a discrepancy in the value of the electron charge between the value that Millikan had measured with his oil drop experiment and the value from X-ray diffraction experiments. Millikan then checked his old experiment and corrected its result. (The viscosity of the air affected the answer. Millikan assigned a student to measure it.) With E. Richard Cohen, DuMond published regular review reports on the status of the determination of the fundamental physical constants. DuMond also developed a gamma-ray spectrometer, finished only after World War II, with which he then pursued nuclear spectroscopy.

During World War II DuMond worked on rocket technology, the construction of an aerial camera, and the demagnetization of ships as a measure against magnetic mines.

== Personal life ==
DuMond was married twice and had two surviving daughters from his first marriage, to Blanche Irène, née Gaebel. Daughter Adèle Irène, née DuMond, married physicist Wolfgang Panofsky, who was DuMond's Ph.D. student while the other daughter Andrée Désirée married physicist Richard Wilson. A son, André Francois (1922-1926), died young. Following a divorce in 1942, he married Louise M. Baillet in 1944. DuMond was a humanist and a prolific correspondent, and he published a two-volume autobiography in 1972.
