= Helen Savier DuMond =

American painter (1872–1968)

- Born: Helen Lydia Savier; August 31, 1872; Portland, Oregon, U.S.
- Died: December 6, 1968 (aged 96); Alhambra, California, U.S.
- Burial place: Grassy Hill Cemetery, Lyme, Connecticut, U.S.
- Other names: Helen Xavier DuMond, Helen Du Mond, Helen DuMond, Helen Dumond
- Education: Art Students League of New York, École des Beaux-Arts
- Occupations: Painter, sculptor, teacher
- Spouse: Frank DuMond (m. 1895–1951; his death)
- Children: 2

Helen Savier DuMond (August 31, 1872 – December 6, 1968; née Helen Lydia Savier) was an American painter, sculptor, and teacher, known for her plein air landscape paintings and miniature paintings.

== Early life and education ==
Helen Lydia Savier was born on August 31, 1872, in Portland, Oregon. Her family was unsure about her study of art.

She moved to New York City to study for six months at the Art Students League of New York under Frank DuMond and Robert Bolling Brandegee; and continued her studies at the École des Beaux-Arts in Paris under Raphaël Collin and Luc-Olivier Merson.

== Career and late life ==
In March 1895, Savier married Frank DuMond her former teacher in Seattle, Washington. The DuMonds spent five years painting in France. Her artwork was exhibited at the Paris Salon in 1897 and 1898.

Around 1906, the DuMond family settled in Old Lyme, Connecticut. She created numerous landscape paintings in green tones with motifs from Connecticut, Maine, and Newfoundland. She was a member of the National Arts Club, the Old Lyme Art Association, and the Art Workers Club.

On February 6, 1951, her husband Frank died. After his death she moved to Southern California. Helen DuMond died at age 96 on December 6, 1968, in Alhambra, California.

== List of exhibitions ==
- 1901, group exhibition at the "statuary court" at Pan-American Exposition, Buffalo, New York, U.S.
- 1908, 103rd Annual Exhibition, gallery G in the group exhibition, Pennsylvania Academy of the Fine Arts, Philadelphia, Pennsylvania, U.S.
- 1912, Thumb Box Paintings, group exhibition, Gill's Art Galleries, Springfield, Massachusetts, U.S.
- 1915, group exhibition, Panama–Pacific International Exposition, San Francisco, California, U.S.
- 1929, 28th Annual Exhibition, group exhibition, Old Lyme Art Association, Old Lyme, Connecticut, U.S
- 1965, group exhibition, Memorial Town Hall, Old Lyme, Connecticut, U.S.
