= Diyogí Tsoh (Big Rug) =

Navajo rug by Julia Bah Joe and Lillie Joe Hill

Diyogí Tsoh (Big Rug) is a Diné (Navajo) rug woven by Julia Bah Joe, a Diné master weaver and her daughter, Lillie Joe Hill, and other members of the Joe family. It is held in the permanent collection of Affeldt Mion Museum in Winslow, Arizona. The intricately patterned rug is hand-spun and hand-dyed from wool produced on Navajo land, from the sheep of co-weaver Lillie Joe Hill and husband David Hill's flocks. The rug was formerly known as the Hubbell-Joe Rug. In 2023, a petition was started demanding Hubbell's name be removed from the weaving; it was signed by more than 1,500 people. In 2025, the rug was renamed Diyogí Tsoh by the Winslow Arts Trust (owners of the rug) to better reflect its history and to honor what the family has always called the rug. The weaving is 21 feet wide by 33 feet long, weighs 250 pounds and took five years to make, including preparing the wool, and weaving the masterwork.

== History ==
Diyogí Tsoh means "Big Rug" in the Navajo language. The rug was woven in Greasewood, Arizona on the Navajo Nation by the master weaver Julia Bah Joe and daughter Lillie Joe Hill, along with other members of her family. The work involved in creating the rug included raising the sheep, shearing the sheep, carding the wool, dyeing the wool, spinning the yarn, setting up a custom built loom from plumbing pipes, and weaving the rug. The rug was commissioned by Lorenzo Hubbell Jr. in 1932 who intended the rug to attract tourists to his trading post during the Depression era. There is no accurate documentation on what the family was paid to create the rug. According to the great granddaughters, the family was given open trade at Hubbell trading posts, all needed supplies, along with cash. In a 1965 Arizona Republic newspaper article, in regards to the question of pay, weaver Julia Joe was quoted, "A box of money. Just money. I do not know how much we got for the rug. Lorenzo gave us a box of money."

After being exhibited for years in a traveling tour, it was purchased by Kyle Bales and stored in Scottsdale, Arizona beginning in the mid-1970s. After Bales death, the rug was inherited by his daughter, Patricia Smith. In 2012, it was purchased by the owner of the La Posada, Allan Affeldt for $100,000 under the conditions that he develop a museum to exhibit the work. Affeldt then donated the rug to the Winslow Arts Trust.

While Diyogí Tsoh was surpassed in size in 1977 by the Big Sister Rug of Chilchinbeto (made with commercially produced yarn and multiple patterns), it is still considered the largest known traditionally made Navajo Rug.

== Description ==
The rug was woven from locally produced, dyed and spun wool from Navajo churro sheep. It took two years to prepare the wool using traditional techniques for shearing the sheep, washing the fiber, carding it, then dying and spinning the wool into yarn.The colors used are the traditional tan, black, grey and "Ganado red", these represent the Universe to the Navajo people.

== Exhibition tour ==
The rug was competed in 1937 and was first presented to the public as "the world's largest Navajo rug" at the Winslow Hubbell Trading Post, as well as at Hubbell's Motor Company in Winslow, Arizona. It was then went on tour throughout the United States, and was exhibited in 1945 in the Senate chambers in Washington, DC. In the 1940s it was toured in the Phoenix, Arizona parade on a horse drawn cart.. Later, in 1964, Diyogí Tsoh was presented to an international audience at the 1964 New York World's Fair. The following year it was exhibited in Phoenix, Arizona at the Heard Museum.
