= Julia Bah Joe =

Navajo weaver (1875–1974)

Julia Bah Joe and her sister Lillie Joe Hill weaving Diyogí Tsoh (Big Rug)

Julia Bah Joe (1875–1974) was a Diné (Navajo) master weaver. She is known for creating the Diyogí Tsoh (Big Rug), a traditionally produced woven Navajo rug, along with her daughter Lillie Joe Hill. The traditionally woven rug holds the world record as the "world's largest Navajo rug" by square footage.

== Work ==
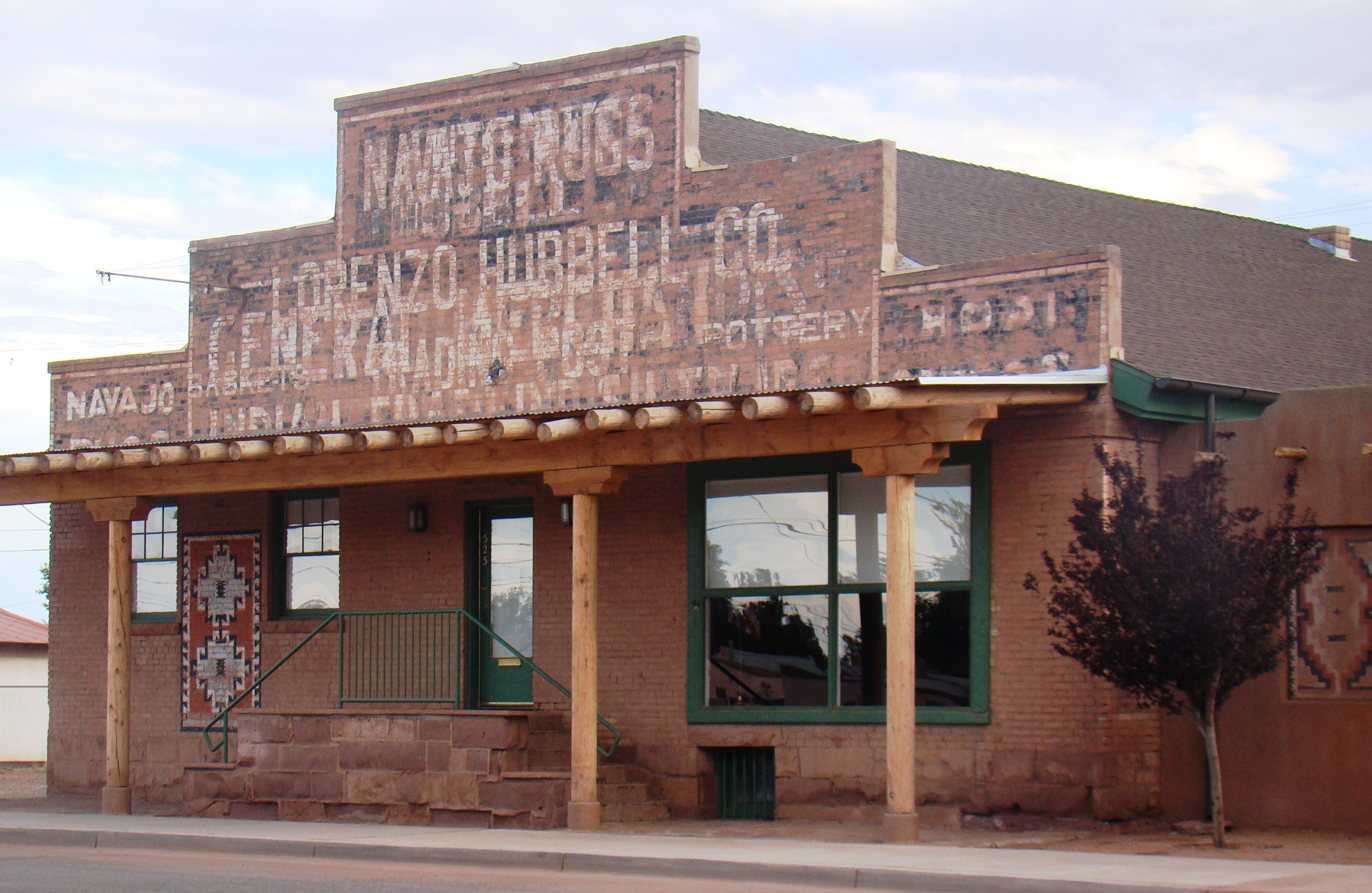
Lorenzo Hubbell Trading Post, Winslow, Arizona

Joe created hundreds of traditionally produced hand-woven works throughout her lifetime. After raising and shearing her churro sheep, she washed, carded, dyed and spun the wool into yarn. The wool from approximately 200 sheep was used to produce her work Diyogí Tsoh (Big Rug), the world's largest Navajo rug, which took her three years to complete. The rug travelled on tour around the U.S. for many years, and was exhibited in the 1964 Worlds Fair in New York. Although she produced over a hundred weavings, the Diyogí Tsoh is considered her "masterwork". It was previously known as the Hubbell-Joe Rug, after it was original commissioner, Lorenzo Hubbell Jr. of the Hubbell Trading Post. Hubbell paid Julia Bah Joe and her family $1900 in a combination of pawn redemption and credit at the trading post for the commission. Naming the weaving after the trader sparked an outcry and a petition drive to change the name, which gathered more than 1,500 signatures. In 2025 it was renamed Diyogí Tsoh.

== Collections ==
Joe's work is currently held in the collection of the Affeldt Mion Museum in Winslow, Arizona. The institution built specifically to house her large weaving, as well as other works. The museum was formerly a train depot designed in the 1930s by Mary Colter. The work is on long-term loan to the museum from the Winslow Arts Trust.

== Personal life ==
Joe was from Greasewood, Arizona on the Navajo Nation lands. She was full-blooded Navajo of the Honagoni and Kinle Cheene clans, according to census records. Joe was married to Sam Joe (Navajo); they had three daughters, Lilly, Helen, Erma and Mary and two sons, Herbert and John.. She had 36 grandchildren and over 40 great grandchildren.

== Death ==
Joe died at the Fort Defiance Hospital at the age of 99.
