= Frank DuMond =

American painter

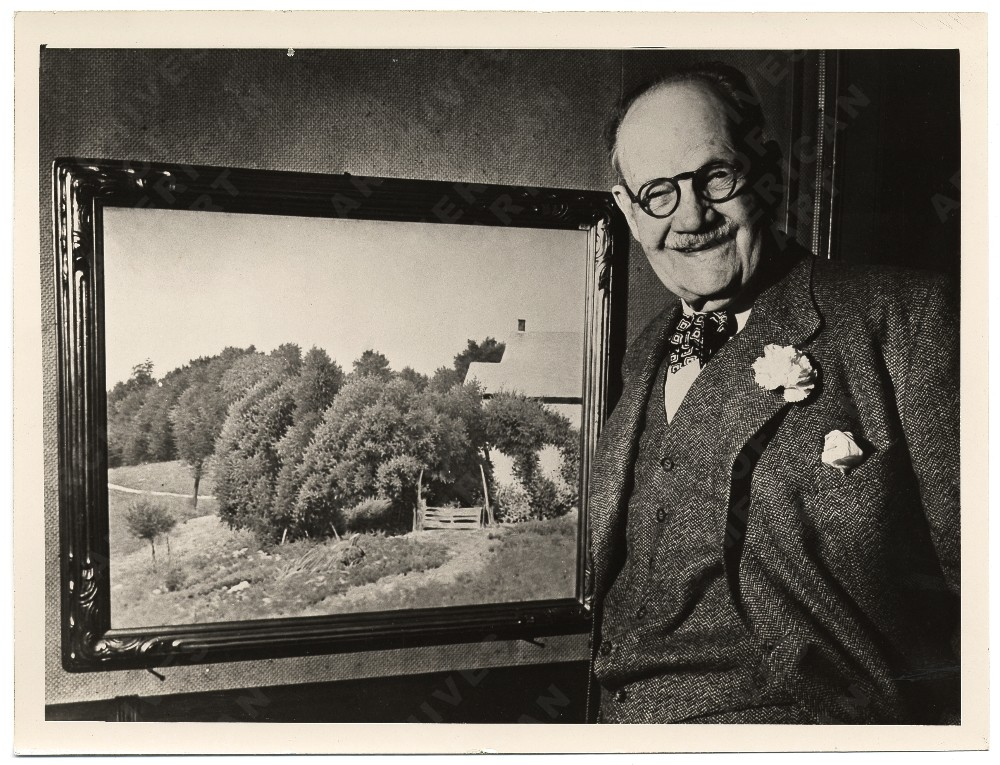
- Born: Frank Vincent DuMond; August 20, 1865; Rochester, New York, United States
- Died: February 6, 1951 (aged 85); New York City, New York, United States
- Education: Art Students League of New York, Académie Julian
- Known for: Painter, illustrator and educator
- Movement: Art Nouveau, Barbizon school, American Impressionism
- Spouse: Helen Lydia Savier (m. 1895–1951; death)
- Children: 2

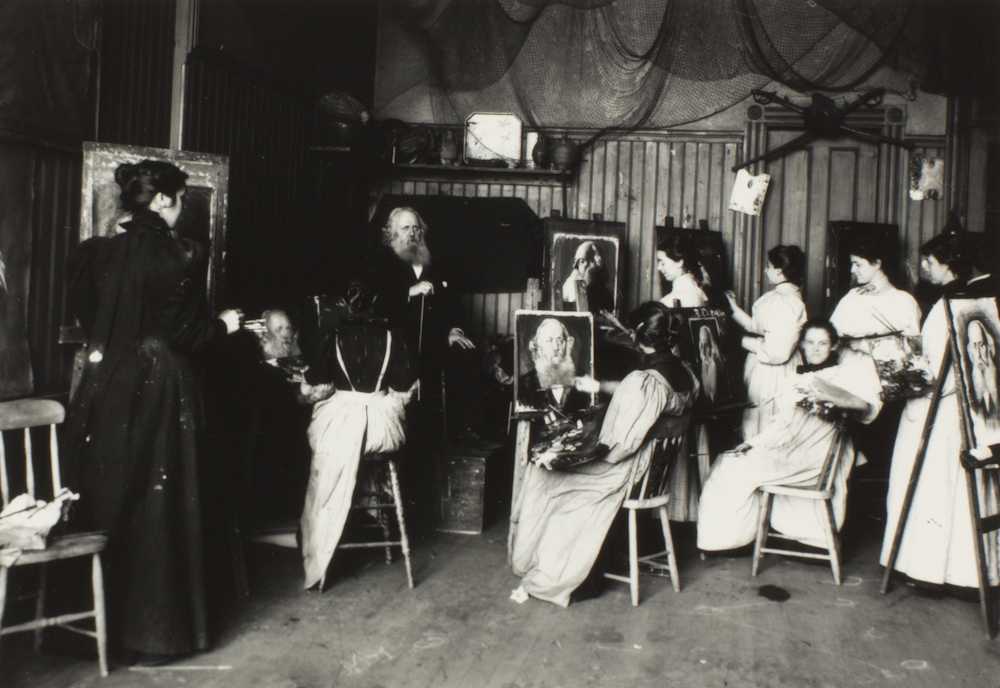
Painting class taught by Frank DuMond in Julia E. Hoffman's studio, ca. 1895

Frank Vincent DuMond (August 20, 1865 – February 6, 1951) was one of the most influential teacher-painters in 20th-century America. He was an illustrator and American Impressionist painter of portraits and landscapes, and a prominent teacher who instructed thousands of art students throughout a career spanning over fifty years.

== Early life and education ==
Frank Vincent DuMond was born on August 20, 1865, in Rochester, New York, to Elisabeth and Alonzo DuMond, partner/owner of an ornamental iron works manufacturer. They also had a younger son, Frederick Melville DuMond (1867 - 1927). Frank DuMond was interested in drawing from a young age, and was involved in the local art scene in the early 1880s. He got a job creating illustrations for a sign painting business. After graduating from a Rochester public school, DuMond moved to New York City in 1884.

From 1884 to 1888, he attended the Art Students League of New York, studying under Carroll Beckwith and William Sartain. DuMond financed his art education by taking a job creating illustrations for New York's Daily Graphic newspaper. As a result of his fine work there, he was offered a job at Harper's Weekly. He also later did work for such magazines as Century, McClure's, and Scribner's.

He moved to Paris to continue his studies, as did his brother Frederick. From 1888 or 1889 to 1891, Frank DuMond attended the Académie Julian, where his instructors included Benjamin Constant, Jules Joseph Lefebvre, and Gustav Boulanger. He attained recognition in 1890 when a painting of his, Holy Family, exhibited at the Salon, was awarded a prestigious medal.

His early work was in the Art Nouveau style, then in Paris he was influenced by the Barbizon school, later becoming an Impressionist. In 1895 he married artist Helen Lydia Savier of Portland, Oregon. They spent five years painting in France, where he also held summer classes for the Art Students League, painting landscapes outdoors from dawn until sunset. In 1900 he was elected into the National Academy of Design, and became a full Academician in 1906.

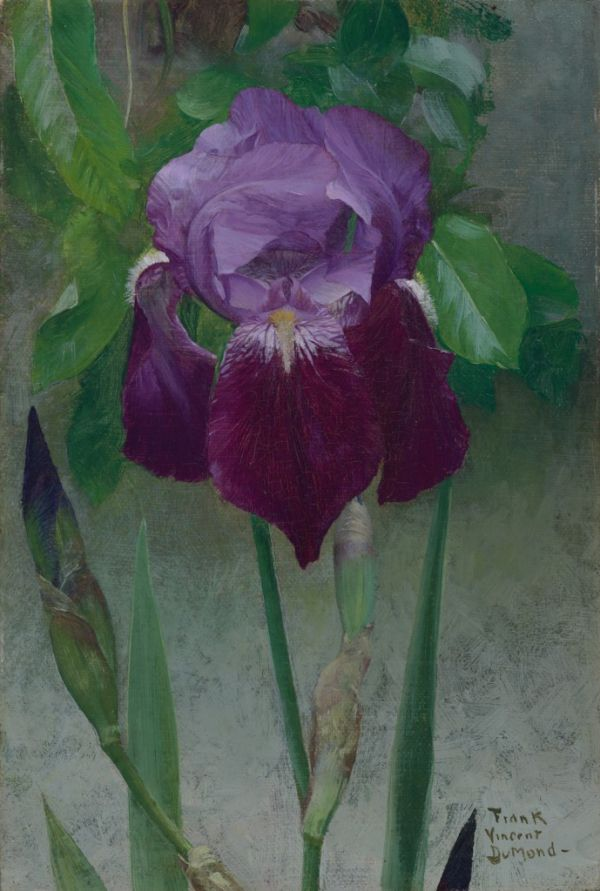
Iris

== Work ==
DuMond exhibited at the Cotton States Exposition in Atlanta, the World's Columbian Exposition in Chicago, the Pan-American Exposition in Buffalo, and the Saint Louis Exposition. He served as director of fine arts at the Lewis and Clark Centennial Exposition in Portland in 1905, and he helped organize the first exhibition at the Portland Art Museum that year. For the 1915 Panama-Pacific Exposition, he prepared two huge murals, 12 feet high by 47 feet long, which now hang in the San Francisco Public Library.

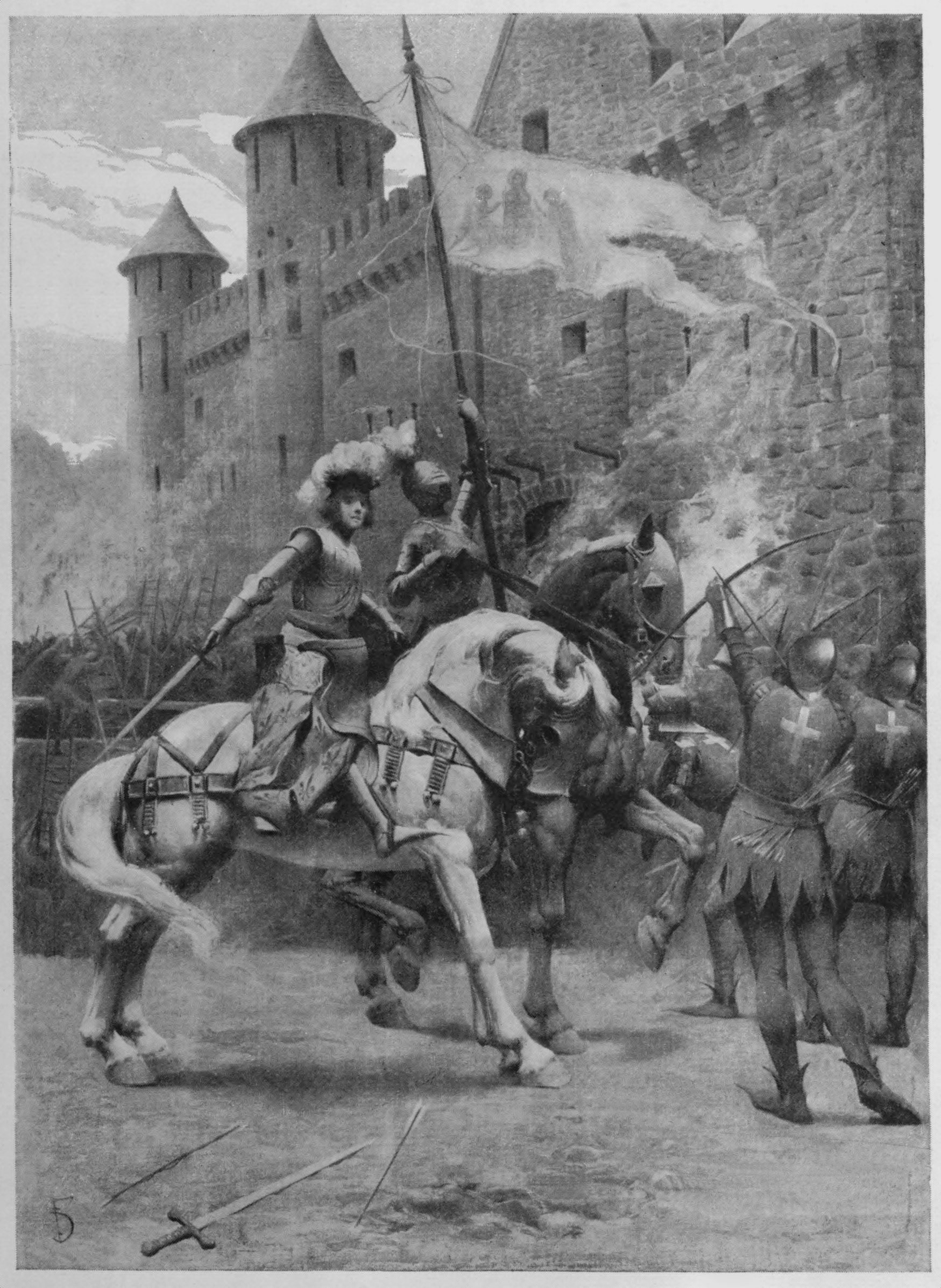
"The Capture of the Tourelles" – illustration from Mark Twain's Personal Recollections of Joan of Arc

The editor of Harper's, who was also president of the Art Students League of New York, convinced him to take a job teaching at the League. He still performed illustration work for a while in addition to teaching, including the artwork for Mark Twain's Personal Recollections of Joan of Arc.

In a teaching career spanning more than fifty years, DuMond taught thousands of artists at the Art Students League of New York. His students included Norman Rockwell, Georgia O'Keeffe, John Marin, Frank J. Reilly, Charles Webster Hawthorne, Frank Herbert Mason, Ogden Pleissner, Kenneth Hayes Miller, Louis Bouché, Eugene Speicher, Helen Winslow Durkee, Arthur Maynard and Rosina Cox Boardman.

DuMond developed a Prismatic Palette, used especially for landscapes. His students were taught to see a progression of prismatic light in pre-mixed paints placed in a tonal progression flowing from yellow to violet on the warm side and from yellow to green to blue green to violet on the cool side. A student quoted DuMond, "Silently glowing over this whole landscape is a rainbow. You must learn to see it. It is there always." Variations of the Prismatic Palette are still used by many artists and teachers and by schools, including the Ridgewood Art Institute in New Jersey.

DuMond was a member of the Old Lyme Art Colony in Old Lyme, Connecticut, where he lived in a neighborhood called Grassy Hill. For several years he headed the Art Students League's Lyme Summer School of Art, where he also taught outdoors, as he had in France. After the school moved to Woodstock, NY, DuMond continued to give private classes in Old Lyme.

DuMond died in New York City on February 6, 1951, at the age of 85.

== Collections ==
DuMond's work is in the permanent collections of the following institutions:

- Brandywine River Museum
- Bruce Museum of Arts and Science
- Cooper–Hewitt, National Design Museum
- Cummer Museum of Art and Gardens
- Delaware Art Museum
- Denver Art Museum
- Florence Griswold Museum
- Lyman Allyn Art Museum
- National Academy of Design
- National Arts Club
- New Britain Museum of American Art
- Portland Art Museum
- Richmond Art Museum

. San Antonio Museum of Art

- San Francisco Arts Commission
- San Francisco Public Library
- Smithsonian American Art Museum
- Society of Illustrators
- Strong Museum
- Virginia Museum of Fine Arts

== Sources ==
- "The Frank Vincent Dumond Papers". Archives of American Art Journal. 13 (1). Smithsonian Institution: 25–28. 1973. doi:10.1086/aaa.13.1.1557022. JSTOR 1557022. S2CID 222436331.
