= Lorenzo Hubbell Trading Post and Warehouse =

- U.S. National Register of Historic Places
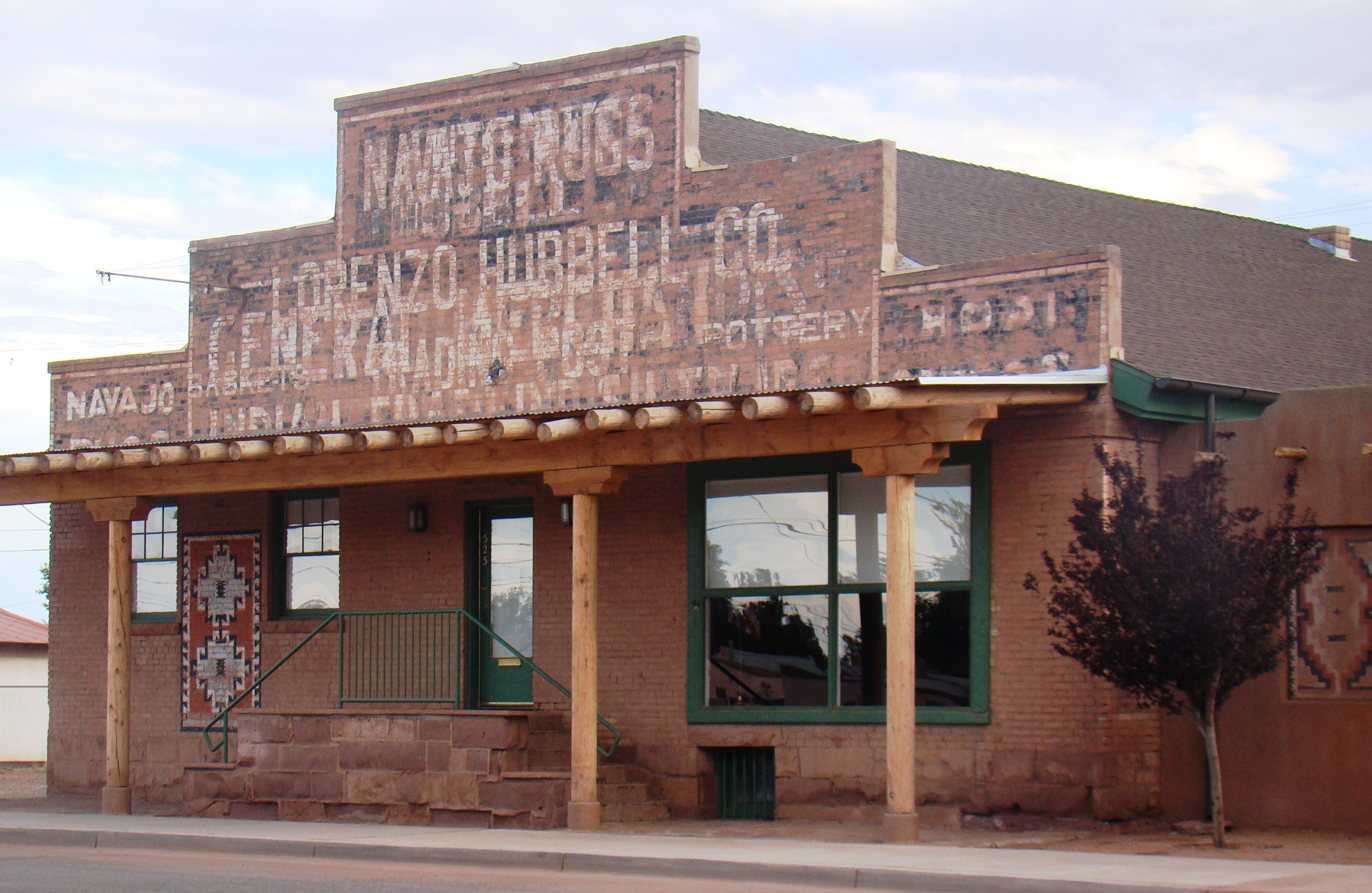
- Facade of the trading post

- Location within Arizona Location within the United States
- Location: Winslow, Arizona
- Coordinates: 35°01′30.35″N 110°42′11.64″W
- Built: 1917
- NRHP reference No.: 02001383
- Added to NRHP: November 21, 2002

The Lorenzo Hubbell Trading Post and Warehouse is located in the western part of the historic center of the city of Winslow, in Navajo County, Arizona.

The building was built in 1917. It was listed on the National Register of Historic Places in 2002, in the Winslow Historic District. It currently serves as the Winslow visitor center.

== History ==
The building was constructed by Hubert and Richardson in 1917. It was bought by Don Lorenzo Hubbell in 1921 and turned into a trading post for goods exchange with Navajo. It was one of about thirty trading posts owned by Hubbell and his family, and one of the two wholesale stores (another one was located in Gallup, New Mexico).

In 2002, it was restored and became a western gateway to the Winslow Historic District.

== See also ==
- Hubbell Trading Post National Historic Site
- La Posada Historic District — also in Winslow.
- National Register of Historic Places listings in Navajo County, Arizona
