= Havasupai (disambiguation) =

Havasupai may refer to:

- Havasupai dialect, a dialect of the Upland Yuman language spoken by fewer than 450 people on the Havasupai Indian Reservation at the bottom of the Grand Canyon
- Havasupai people, an American Indian tribe that has called the Grand Canyon its home for at least the past 800 years
- Havasupai Trail, the main trail to Supai, Arizona and to Havasu Falls
- Havasupai–Hualapai language, the Native American language spoken by the Hualapai (Walapai) and Havasupai peoples
