= Havasupai Indian Reservation =

Indian reservation in Arizona, U.S.

Coordinates: 36.1914°N 112.6403°W

Havasupai Indian Reservation Havsuw’ Baaja (Havasupai–Hualapai)
- Reservation
- Flag
- Location of Havasupai Indian Reservation
- Capital: Supai

Government
  - Body: Havasupai Tribal Council
  - Chairwoman: Eva Kissoon
  - Vice Chair: Matthew Putesoy Sr.

Area
  - Total: 763.22 km^{2} (294.68 sq mi)

Population (2010)
  - Total: 639
  - Density: 0.837/km^{2} (2.17/sq mi)
- Time zone: MST

The Havasupai Indian Reservation is a Native American reservation for the Havasupai people, bordering Grand Canyon National Park, in Coconino County in Arizona, United States. It is considered one of America's most remote Indian reservations.

It is the land base of the Havasupai Tribe of the Havasupai Reservation, a federally recognized tribe. The reservation is governed by a seven-member tribal council, led by a chairman who is elected from among the members of the council. The capital of the reservation is Supai, situated at the bottom of Cataract Canyon (also known as Havasu Canyon), one of the tributary canyons of the Grand Canyon.

== Name ==
Havasupai is a combination of the words Havasu (meaning "blue-green water") and pai (meaning "people"), thus meaning "people of the blue-green waters".

== Government ==
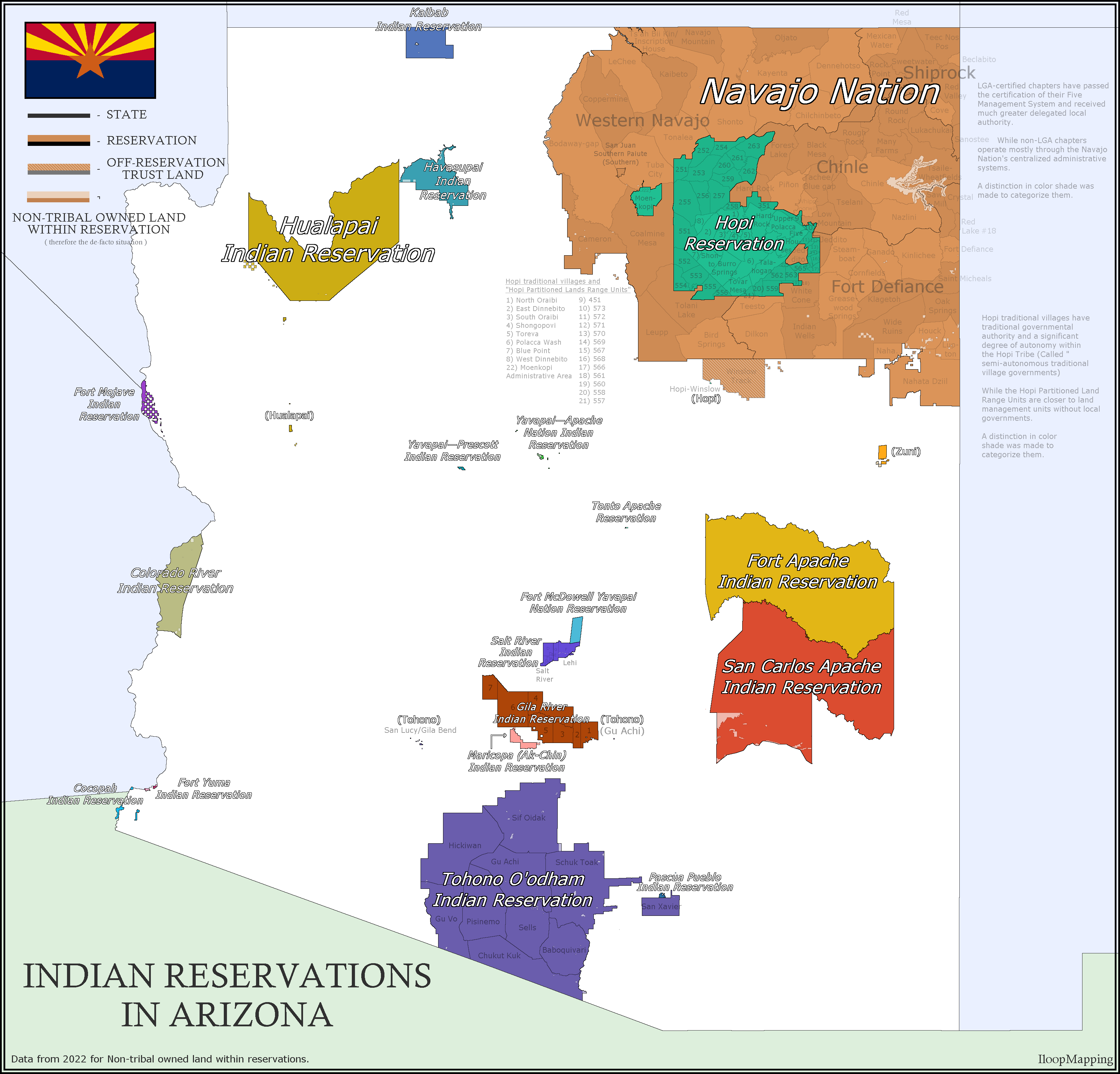
Map of the Havasupai Tribe and neighboring tribes.

The tribe passed their Constitution on March 27, 1939. In it the governing body was defined as a seven-member tribal council, which handles most policy matters. Four of the councilmen were to be elected and serve two years, with the remaining three councilmen being hereditary chiefs of the tribe, who would serve for life. The council is led by a chairman who is elected from among the members of the council. The Bureau of Indian Affairs (BIA) is the entity charged with law enforcement and protection for the Tribe, while the Indian Health Service clinic provides health care and emergency services.

In 2025, the Havauspai Tribe's chairwoman is Melinda Yaiva.

== Geography ==
Located in Coconino County, the reservation sits at the southwest corner of the Grand Canyon National Park, considered one of America's most remote Indian reservations. The nearest community to the reservation is Peach Springs, Arizona, which lies approximately 64 miles to the southwest. The topography of the reservation is made up of plateau country, dissected with deep canyons. The plateau itself varies from rolling, gentle slopes, to escarpments of Kaibab Limestone. While similar to other locations within the system of canyons of which it is part, Cataract Canyon is unique due to the high concentrations of travertine in Havasu Creek. The canyon itself is the largest individual side-canyon to the Grand Canyon. The presence of the travertine is what leads to the aquamarine color of the streams and ponds in the canyon. There is another small settlement at Indian Gardens.

The main population center of the reservation is centered around Cataract Canyon (also known as Havasu Canyon), where the capital of the reservation, Supai, is located. Supai has been referred to as "the most remote community" in the contiguous United States by the U.S. Department of Agriculture. It is accessible only by helicopter, on foot or by mule. Supai is 8 miles (13 km) from the nearest road and has no automobiles in the community. It is the only place in the United States where mail is still carried out by mules.

Notable geographic features include The Great Thumb, Long Mesa, and Tenderfoot Mesa. The main attraction is Havasu Creek, with aquamarine water (due to the presence of travertine), the stream is one of the longest tributaries on the south side of the Colorado River, and falls 1,400 feet (430 m) over its course. The stream is renowned for its waterfalls, which include Havasu Falls, Mooney Falls, and Beaver Falls. A fourth well-known falls, Navajo Falls, is no longer in existence following a devastating flood in 2008. While Navajo Falls is no longer in existence, the re-routing of the stream created two new falls, Fifty Foot Falls and Little Navajo Falls.

== Flora and fauna ==
Non-human denizens of the reservation include canyon tree frogs, cottontail rabbits, rattlesnakes, desert kingsnakes, and California condors.

In the canyons, canyon grapevine and giant Fremont cottonwood trees can be found.

== Economy ==
Tourism is a large portion of the economy of the reservation. The tribe runs its own tourism office, as well as a café, lodge, and general store. Individual members of the tribe also have small businesses, leading tour groups and packing supplies in and out of the canyon. In 2008, a dam burst upstream, causing a torrent to sweep through the canyon, resulting in significant damage to the natural resources as well as man-made structures. The tourism industry was devastated. The tribe received a one million dollar grant from the Yuhaaviatam of San Manuel Nation to assist in the economic recovery of the reservation.

The tribe also runs a campground in the canyon, as well as the Havasupai Tribal Museum, which displays photography of the reservation, as well as offering tribal crafts for sale. On the second weekend in August, the tribe holds an annual Peach Festival.

Havasu Canyon receives approximately 500 visitors per day during the summer months, and has an annual total of approximately 25,000.

== Language ==
Citizens of the tribe speak Havasupai, a Yuman language. It is one of about 200 indigenous languages spoken in North America.

== Education ==
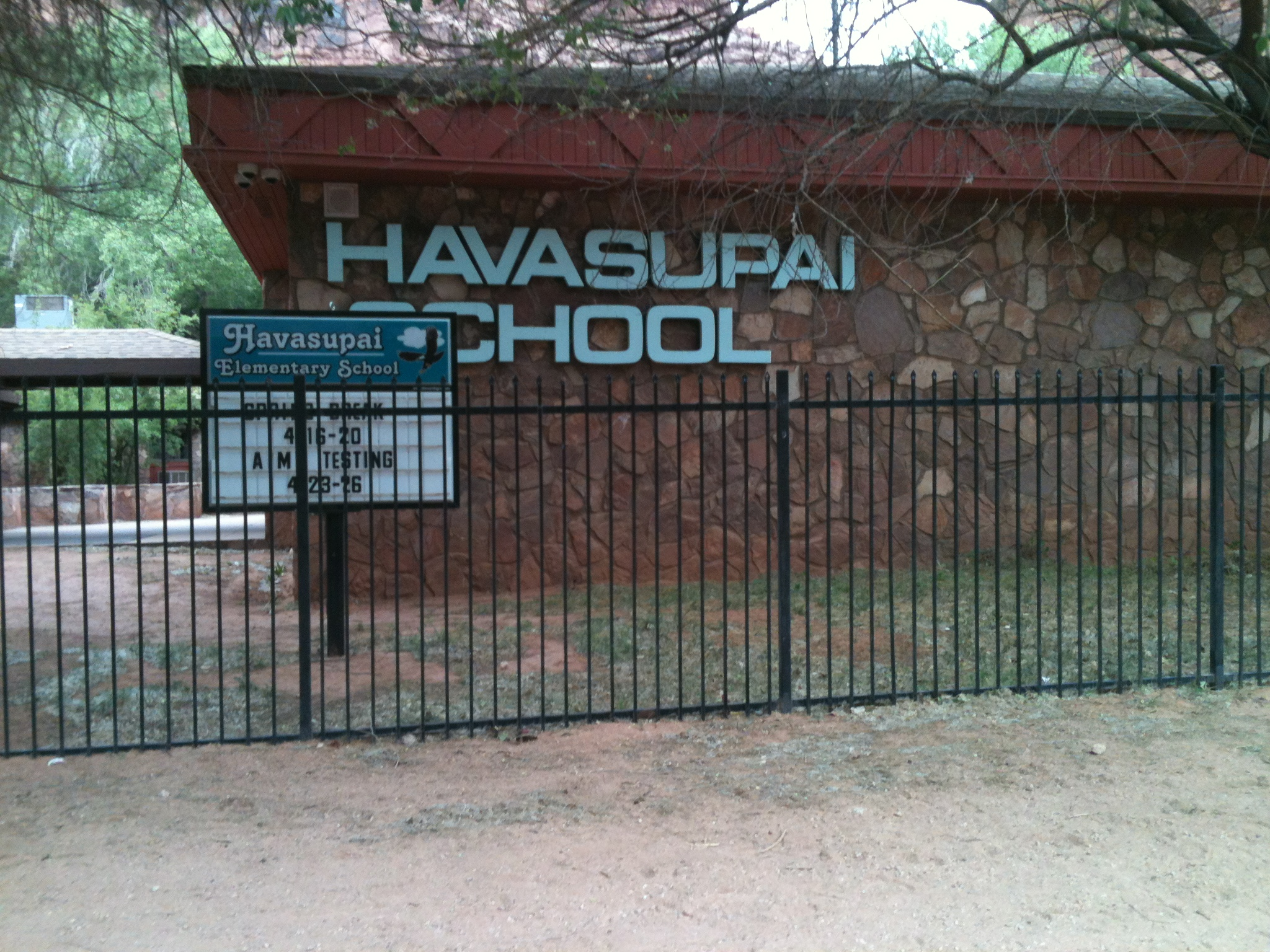
Havasupai Elementary School

Havasupai Elementary School is operated by the Bureau of Indian Education.

According to Coconino County's parcel viewer, the reservation is in the "Unorganized School District #00". According to Arizona law, an unorganized school district is one that does not have a high school. The 2010 U.S. census school district map for Coconino County shows the reservation as in "School District Not Defined".

== History ==
The Havasupai lived, farmed, and hunted throughout their traditional territory, comprising the canyons and plateaus in and around Havasu Canyon, for centuries before the arrival of Europeans. They farmed in the canyons in spring and summer, and moved to the plateau lands for fall and winter.

=== 19th century ===
In the 1870s, when European miners, ranchers, and settlers arrived in the Arizona Territory in increasing numbers, pressure increased to confine the Havasupai and other tribes to small and demarcated reservations. In 1882, President Chester Arthur established the Havasupai Indian Reservation by Executive Order, and restricted the tribe to 518 acres within Havasu Canyon. The rest of their ancestral lands were taken by the federal government for public use. According to reports, the Havasupai were completely unaware of the Executive Order for several years. The reduction of their lands led to a disruption on the tribe's way of life, and constant tension between the tribe and the U.S. government.

=== 20th century ===
With the creation of the Grand Canyon National Park in 1919, the reservation was completely surrounded by National Park lands. By agreement with the federal government, the reservation and the trails which led down to it remained sovereign to the Havasupai tribe. The tribe continually lobbied the United States to restore more of their ancestral land to them, although to no avail. In the 1950s, a superintendent of the Grand Canyon, John McLaughlin, proposed to take over the reservation, but he was rebuffed by the tribe.

Eventually the persistence of the tribe began to pay off. In 1968, the tribe won a case against the government with the Indian Claim Commission. The ruling stated that the lands had been taken illegally from the tribe in 1882, and that the tribe had the right to recover the lands by paying the government fair market value for the property. At a rate of 55 cents an acre, the value of the lands was set at slightly more than one million dollars. However, the tribe still fought for having the lands returned to them, without having to pay for them. The tribe found support from the Nixon administration, and began to lobby for passage of congressional bill S. 1296, which would return the lands to the tribe. Finally, in 1975, the U.S. Congress passed the Grand Canyon National Park Enlargement Act, which was signed into law by President Gerald Ford on January 4, 1975. Among other things, the Act returned 188,077 acres (76,112 ha) of plateau and canyon lands to the Havasupai, which is what forms the reservation today.
