= Havasu Falls =

Waterfall in the Grand Canyon in Arizona

Coordinates: 36°15′19″N 112°41′53″W

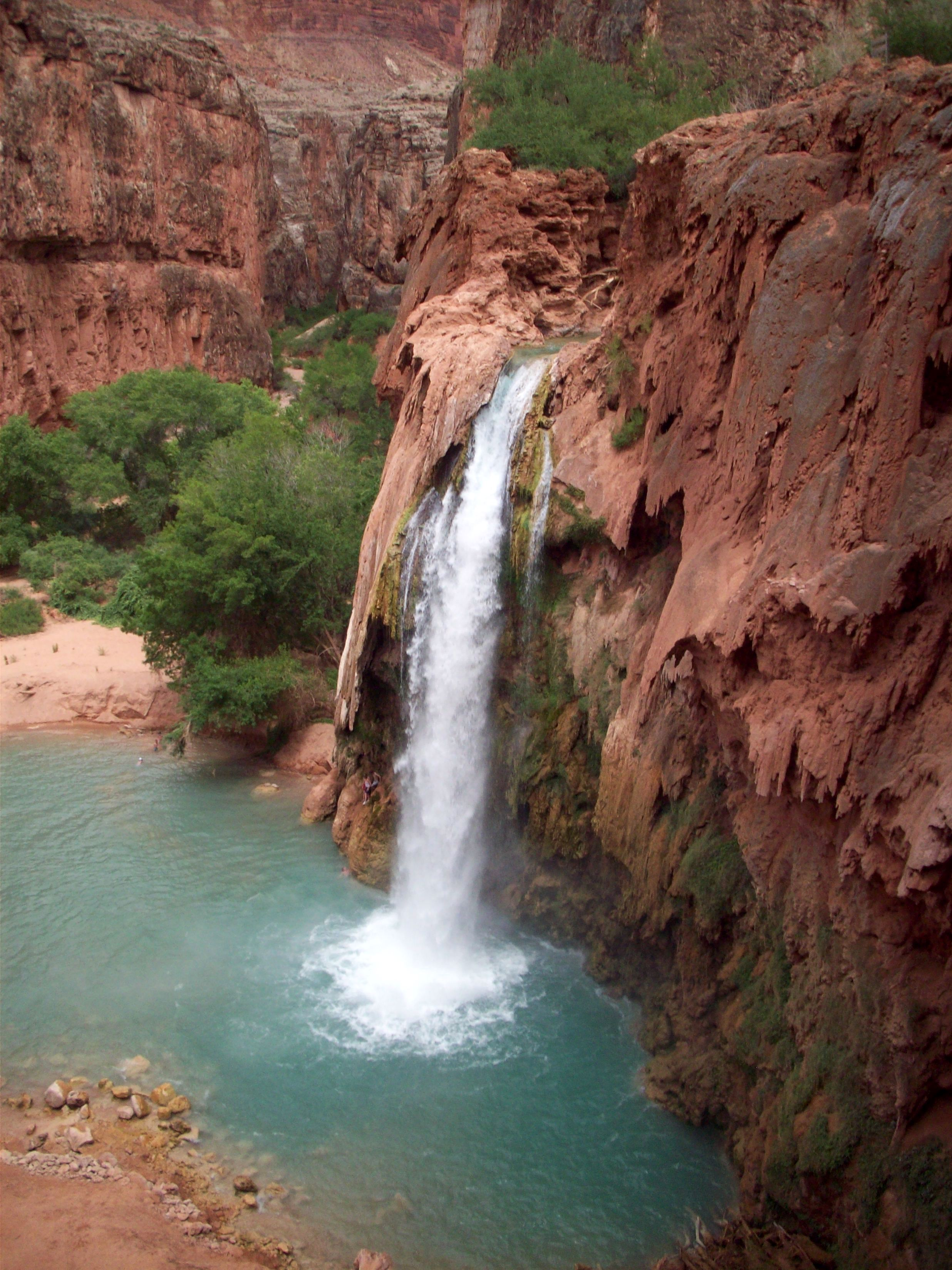
Havasu Falls

Havasu Falls (Havasupai: Havasuw Hagjahgeevma) is a waterfall of Havasu Creek, located in the Grand Canyon, Arizona, United States. It is within Havasupai tribal lands.

== Geography ==
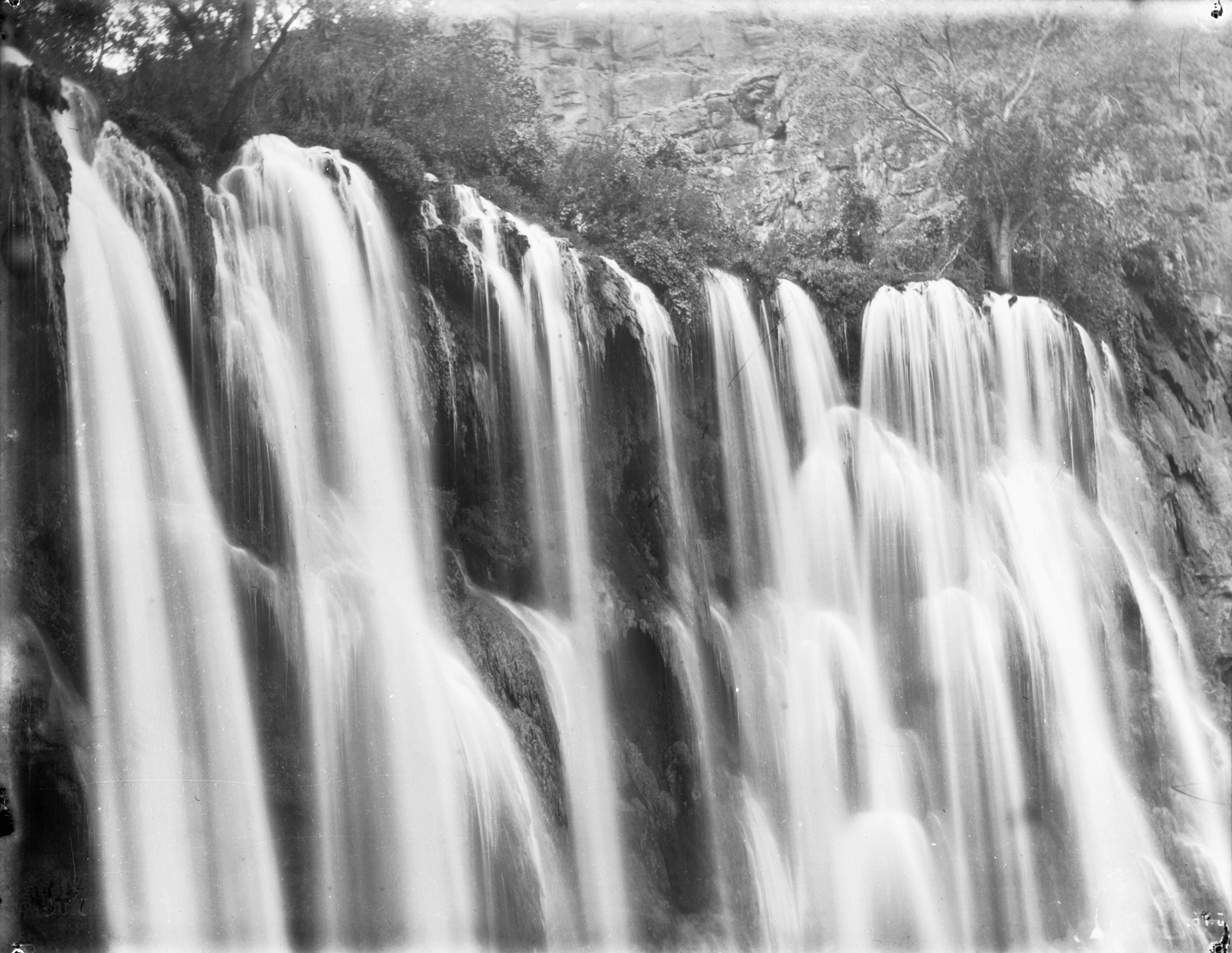
Havasu Falls prior to 1910 (aka Bridal Veil Falls)

Havasu Falls is located 1.5 miles (2.4 km) from Supai. It is the most famous and visited of the various falls along Havasu Creek. It consists of one main chute that drops over a 90-to-100-foot (27 to 30 m) vertical cliff into a series of plunge pools. High calcium carbonate concentration in the water creates a vivid blue-green color and forms the natural travertine dams that occur in various places near the falls.

Due to the effects of flash floods, the appearance of Havasu Falls and its plunge pools has changed many times. Before the flood of 1910, water flowed in a near continuous sheet, and was known as Bridal Veil Falls. The notch through which water flows first appeared in 1910, and has changed several times since. Water currently flows as one stream. In the past, there were sometimes multiple streams or a continuous flow over the edge.

== Recreation ==
There are many picnic tables on the opposite side of the creek, and it is easy to cross over by following the edges of the pools. Swimming behind the falls and entering a small rock shelter behind it is possible. However, drownings have occurred. There is no access to drinking water from the trailhead parking lot to the Supai Village. Hikers are advised to bring their water with them. In Supai, there is a general store and cafe where food and beverage can be purchased. The hike from Hualapai Hilltop to the lodge and tourist office in Supai is 8 mi (13 km). 2 mi (3 km) is an additional hike to the falls and campground.

== Campground ==
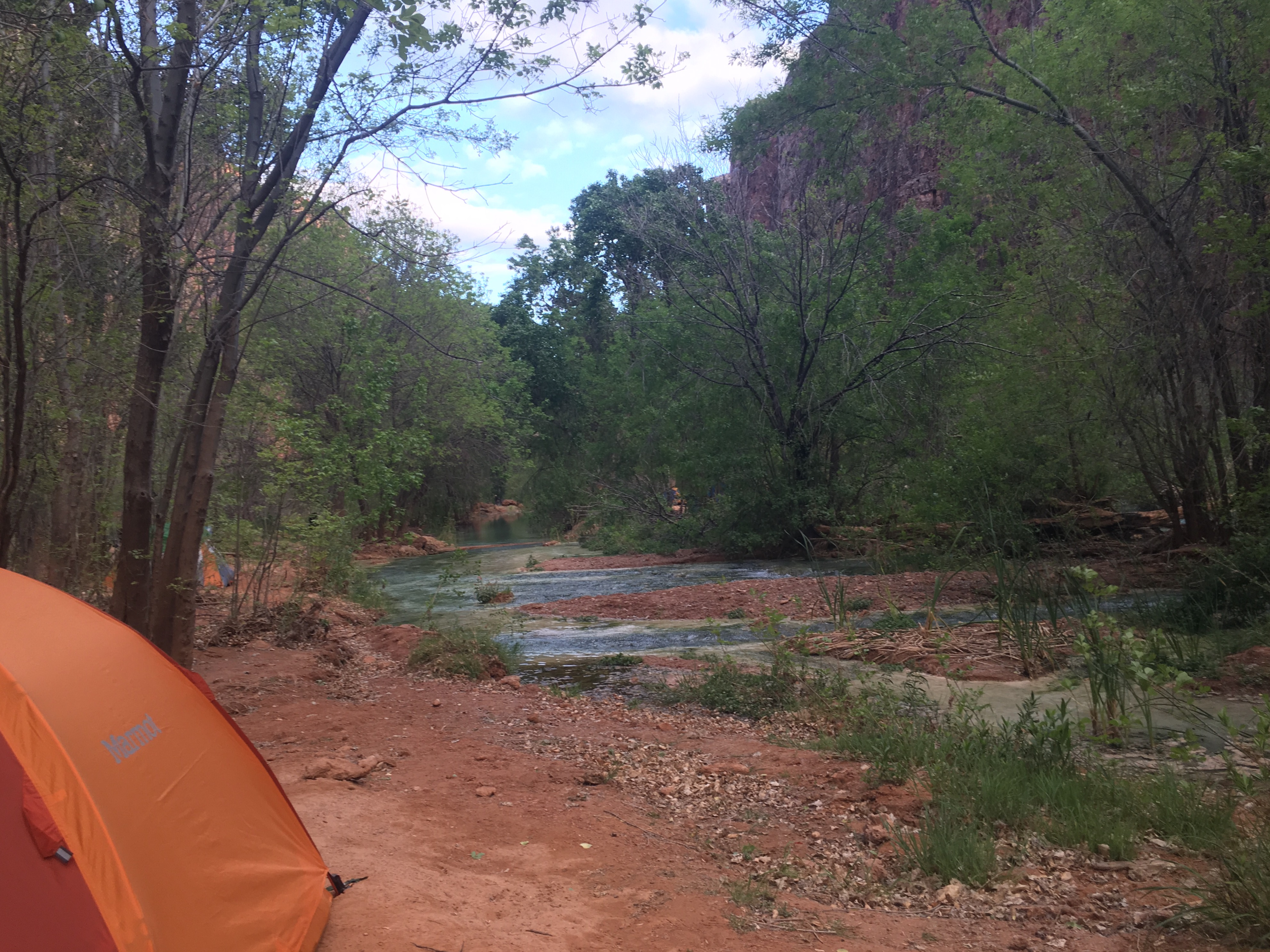

A campground is located nearby. Visitors are required to reserve permits prior to their travel to the Havasupai Indian Reservation.

== Featured ==
Havasu Falls appeared in the 2007 movie Next starring Nicolas Cage, Julianne Moore, and Jessica Biel.

The falls also appear in Beyoncé's 2019 music video for "Spirit", a song written for the remake of The Lion King.

== See also ==
- List of waterfalls
- Navajo Falls
- Mooney Falls
- Beaver Falls, Arizona
