= Havasupai Trail =

Historic trail in Coconino County, Arizona

Coordinates: 36.1599°N 112.7092°W

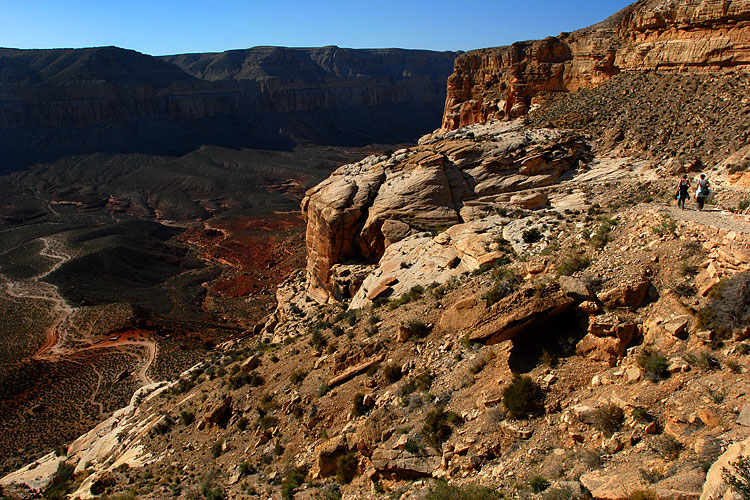
Havasupai Trail

Havasupai Trail is the main trail to Supai, Arizona, and to Havasu Falls. There are other trails, such as the Topocoba, Moqui and Kirby trails. However, these other trails are not maintained. As far back as 1976, they were described as ranging from "in poor repair" to "primitive, dangerous foot trails." Special permission is required to use any such trail.

Though getting permission can be difficult, the trail is popular with backpackers who, once approved, camp at the Havasupai tribe campground below Havasu Falls and above Mooney Falls. The campground and main falls are roughly 11 miles from the trailhead at Hualapai Hilltop. ("Backpack Trail Guide: Havasu Falls Trail (Havasupai Indian Reservation)".)

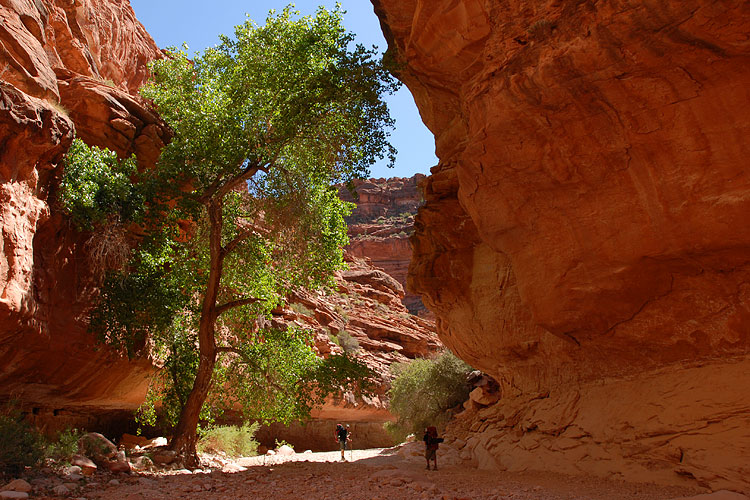
Narrowing canyon

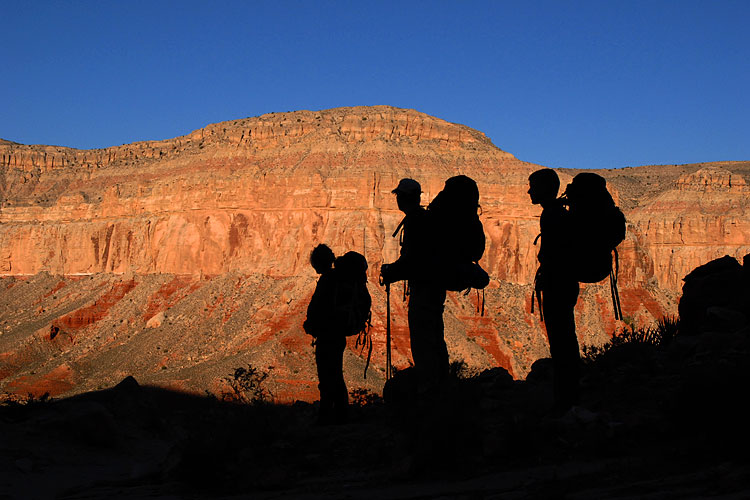
Hikers near Hualapai Hilltop
