= Supai, Arizona =

CDP in Coconino County, Arizona

- CDP
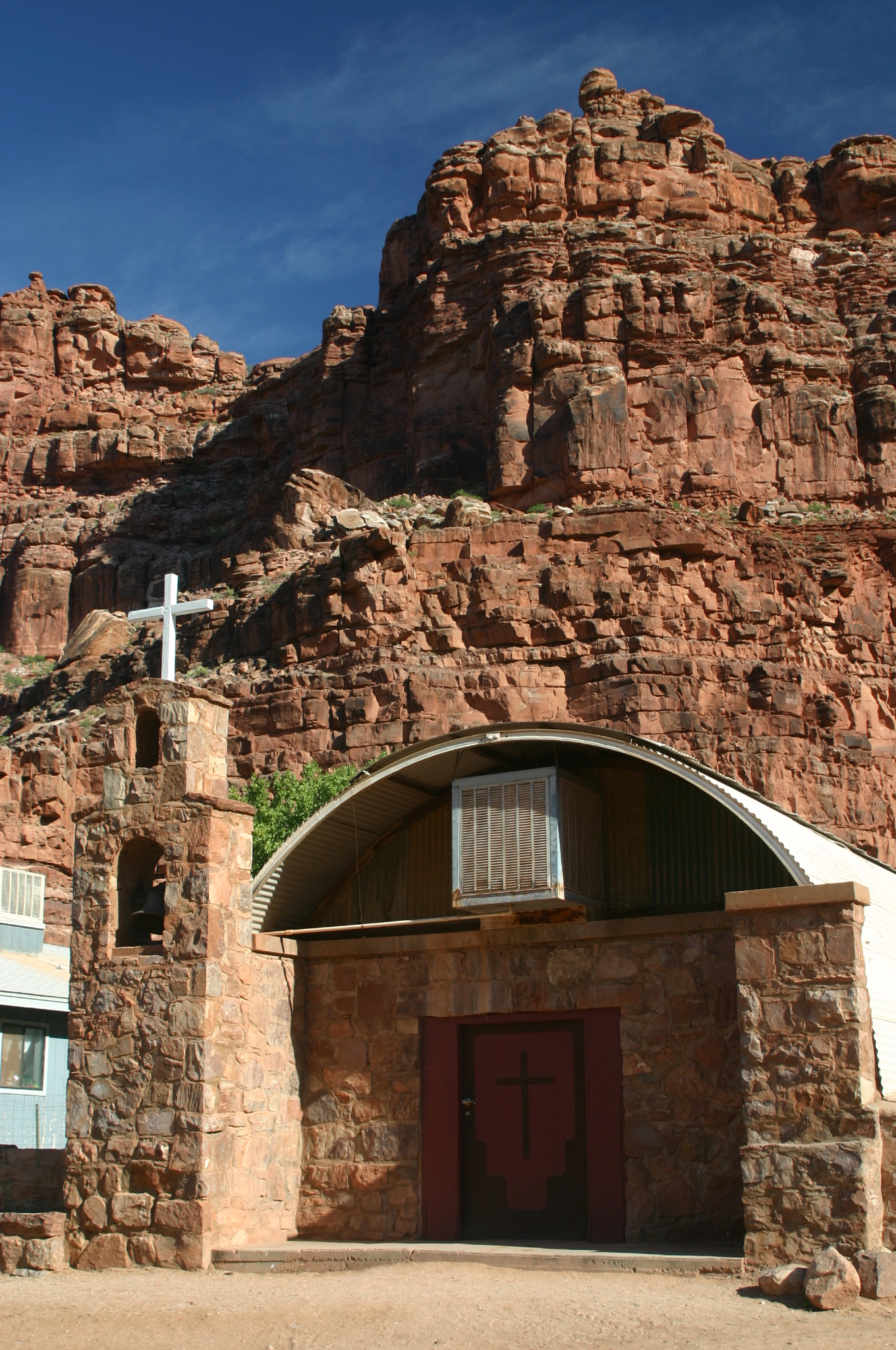
- Church building in Supai
- Location in Coconino County and the state of Arizona
- Location in Arizona Location in the United States
- Coordinates: 36°13′48″N 112°41′33″W
- Country: United States
- State: Arizona
- County: Coconino

Area
  - Total: 1.72 sq mi (4.46 km^{2})
  - Land: 1.72 sq mi (4.46 km^{2})
  - Water: 0 sq mi (0.00 km^{2})
- Elevation: 3,202 ft (976 m)

Population (2010)
  - Total: 208
  - Density: 120.788/sq mi (46.6367/km^{2})
- Time zone: UTC-7 (MST)
- ZIP code: 86435
- Area code: 928
- FIPS code: 04-71230
- GNIS feature ID: 2410036
- Website: theofficialhavasupaitribe.com

Supai (Havasupai: Havasuuw) is a census-designated place (CDP) in Coconino County, Arizona, United States, within the Grand Canyon on the valley floor.

As of the 2010 census, the CDP had a population of 208. The capital of the Havasupai Indian Reservation, Supai is the only place in the United States where mail is still carried in and out by mules.

Supai has been referred to as "the most remote community" in the contiguous United States by the U.S. Department of Agriculture. It is accessible only by helicopter, on foot or by mule. Supai is 8 miles (13 km) from the nearest road and has no automobiles in the community.

== History ==
The Havasupai have settled in the region for over a millennium. During the late 19th century, increasing encroachments by cattle farmers and mining operations sanctioned by the United States federal government led to the displacement of the Havasupai from the high plateau of the Grand Canyon. As a result, the Havasupai were gradually confined to the floor of Havasu Canyon, where they traditionally farmed land nourished by silt deposited by the Colorado River. In 1880, the federal government formally established the Havasupai Reservation within the canyon.

In 1910, a flood in Supai affected the town.

In the 1960s, Martin Goodfriend, a tourist, began to advocate for the Supai people, and a columnist of the Arizona Republic, Don Dedera, wrote articles about Goodfriend's findings. Dedera stated that Goodfriend countered a view that Supai was a kind of "Shangri-la".

Tourists and some residents were evacuated from Supai and surrounding area on August 17 and 18, 2008, due to flooding of Havasu Creek complicated by the failure of the earthen Redlands Dam (subsequent to the main flooding event) after a night of heavy rainfall. Evacuees were taken to Peach Springs, Arizona. More heavy rains were expected and a flash flood warning was put into effect, necessitating the evacuation, according to the National Park Service. The floods were significant enough to attract coverage from international media.

Damage to the trails, bridges, and campground was severe enough that the Havasupai closed visitor access to the village, campground, and falls until the spring of 2009. Further flooding in 2010 resulted in damage to repairs made previously and closures effective until May 2011. In July 2018, flash flooding forced the helicopter evacuation of 200 visitors. All tourism was suspended from March 2020 until February 2023 due to the COVID-19 pandemic.

== Geography and climate ==
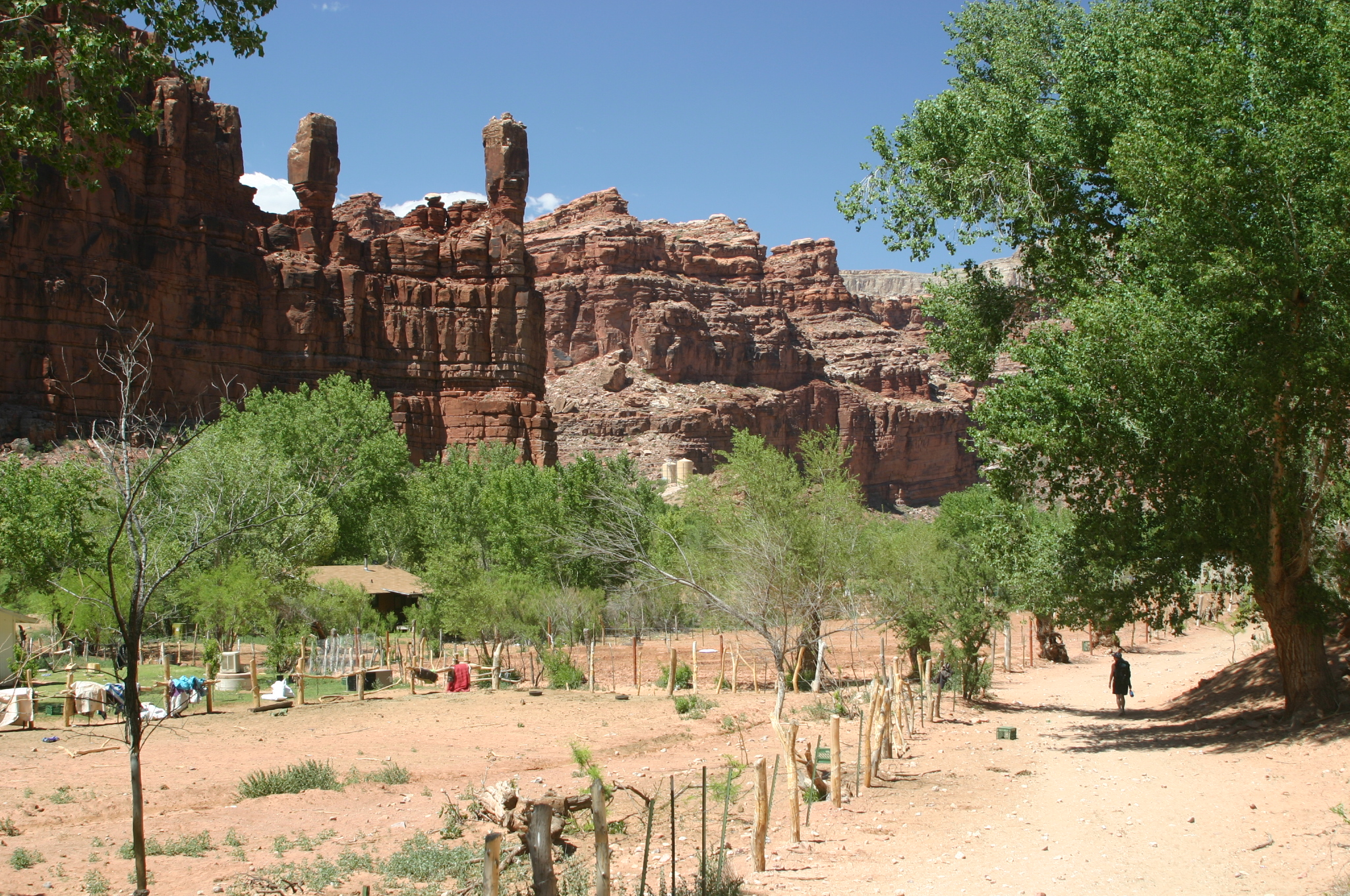
The Wigleeva rock formations watch over Supai

Located within the Grand Canyon, Supai is accessible only by foot, pack animal or helicopter. It is the only place in the United States where mules still carry the mail, most of which is food.

According to the United States Census Bureau, the CDP has a total area of 1.7 square miles (4.4 km^{2}), all land. It lies 3,195 feet (974 m) above sea level.

=== Climate ===
Supai has a cool desert climate (Köppen climate classification BWk), with very hot summers coupled with mild nights, and relatively mild winters with nights cooling off to below freezing on many days.

Climate data for Supai, 1956–1987
Month	Jan	Feb	Mar	Apr	May	Jun	Jul	Aug	Sep	Oct	Nov	Dec	Year
Record high °F (°C)	79 (26)	87 (31)	95 (35)	98 (37)	104 (40)	112 (44)	116 (47)	111 (44)	111 (44)	102 (39)	86 (30)	85 (29)	116 (47)
Mean daily maximum °F (°C)	52.8 (11.6)	59.8 (15.4)	67.7 (19.8)	76.1 (24.5)	85.1 (29.5)	95.7 (35.4)	99.0 (37.2)	95.6 (35.3)	90.1 (32.3)	77.0 (25.0)	62.8 (17.1)	52.8 (11.6)	76.1 (24.5)
Mean daily minimum °F (°C)	29.4 (−1.4)	34.5 (1.4)	39.2 (4.0)	45.5 (7.5)	53.2 (11.8)	61.7 (16.5)	67.1 (19.5)	65.4 (18.6)	58.4 (14.7)	47.8 (8.8)	37.4 (3.0)	30.0 (−1.1)	47.5 (8.6)
Record low °F (°C)	−1 (−18)	5 (−15)	13 (−11)	23 (−5)	29 (−2)	36 (2)	46 (8)	42 (6)	34 (1)	19 (−7)	0 (−18)	−4 (−20)	−4 (−20)
Average precipitation inches (mm)	0.61 (15)	0.63 (16)	0.88 (22)	0.38 (9.7)	0.41 (10)	0.26 (6.6)	1.24 (31)	1.42 (36)	0.65 (17)	0.61 (15)	0.72 (18)	0.75 (19)	8.54 (217)
Average snowfall inches (cm)	0.4 (1.0)	0.2 (0.51)	0 (0)	0 (0)	0 (0)	0 (0)	0 (0)	0 (0)	0 (0)	0 (0)	0.1 (0.25)	0.6 (1.5)	1.2 (3.0)
Average precipitation days (≥ 0.01 in)	4	4	5	3	2	1	5	6	3	3	3	4	44
Source: WRCC

== Demographics ==
As with many communities living on reservations, the census is often miscounted. In the 2020 census, the population of Supai was counted as zero. In 2023, the Associated Press reported that "about 500 of the nearly 770" members of the Havasupai tribe live in the village.

Historical population
Census	Pop.	Note	%±
1990	423		—
2000	503		18.9%
2010	208		−58.6%
2020	0		−100.0%
U.S. Decennial Census *(The 2020 US Census incorrectly reported the population as being 0 due to "uncertain [reasons]" according to the tribal chairman Thomas Siyuja Sr.)

As of the census of 2010, there were 208 people and 43 households. The racial makeup of the CDP was 96.6% Native American, 0.5% White, 0.5% Other, and 2.4% of mixed race. Hispanic or Latino of any race were 4.3% of the population.

There were 43 households, out of which 34.9% were married families living together, 32.6% had a female householder with no husband present, 14.0% had a male householder with no wife present, and 18.6% were non-families. 16.3% of all households were made up of individuals, and 2.3% had someone living alone who was 65 years of age or older. The average household size was 4.84.

In the CDP the population was spread out, with 30.8% under the age of 16, 10.4% from 16 to 21, 54.8% from 21 to 65, and 4.8% who were 65 years of age or older. The median age was 25.2 years. 48.6% of the population was male; 51.4% was female.

== Government and infrastructure ==
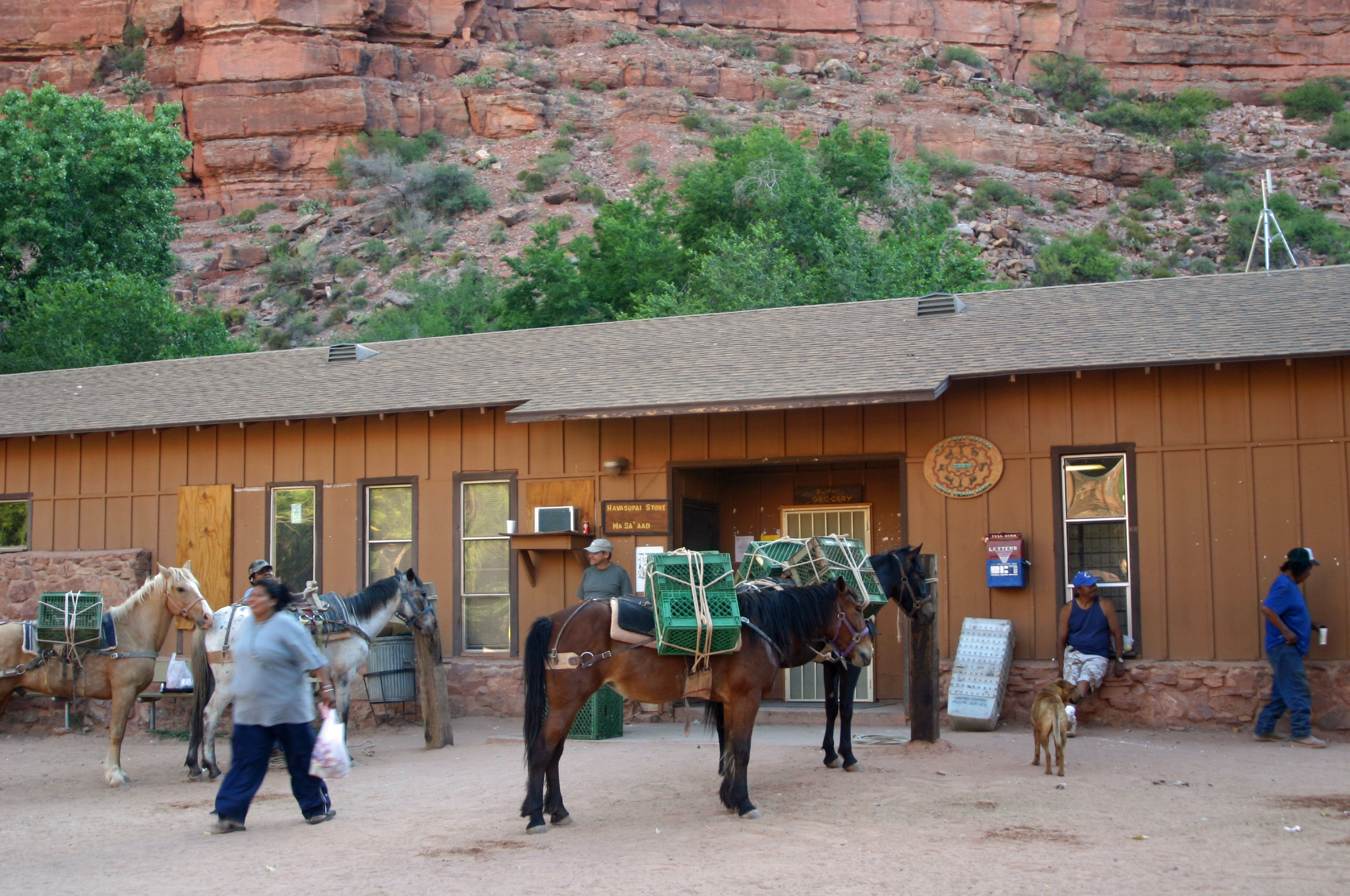
Mule train in front of the convenience store and post office

Supai is located inside the Grand Canyon on tribal lands outside of national park jurisdiction and is governed by the tribe.

There is a post office in Supai. Mules are used to ferry mail between Supai and the rest of the United States. Perishable goods are, as of 2016, stored in a walk-in freezer at the Peach Springs, Arizona, post office while they await being loaded onto mules. According to The Smithsonian, the Peach Springs post office is the only one in the country with a walk-in freezer.

A contractor, who as of 2016 had held the contract with the post office for 25 years, picks up the mail and drives it an hour to the trailhead, where it is loaded onto mules for the journey down the canyon. Each mule carries up to 200 pounds of mail.

=== Access ===
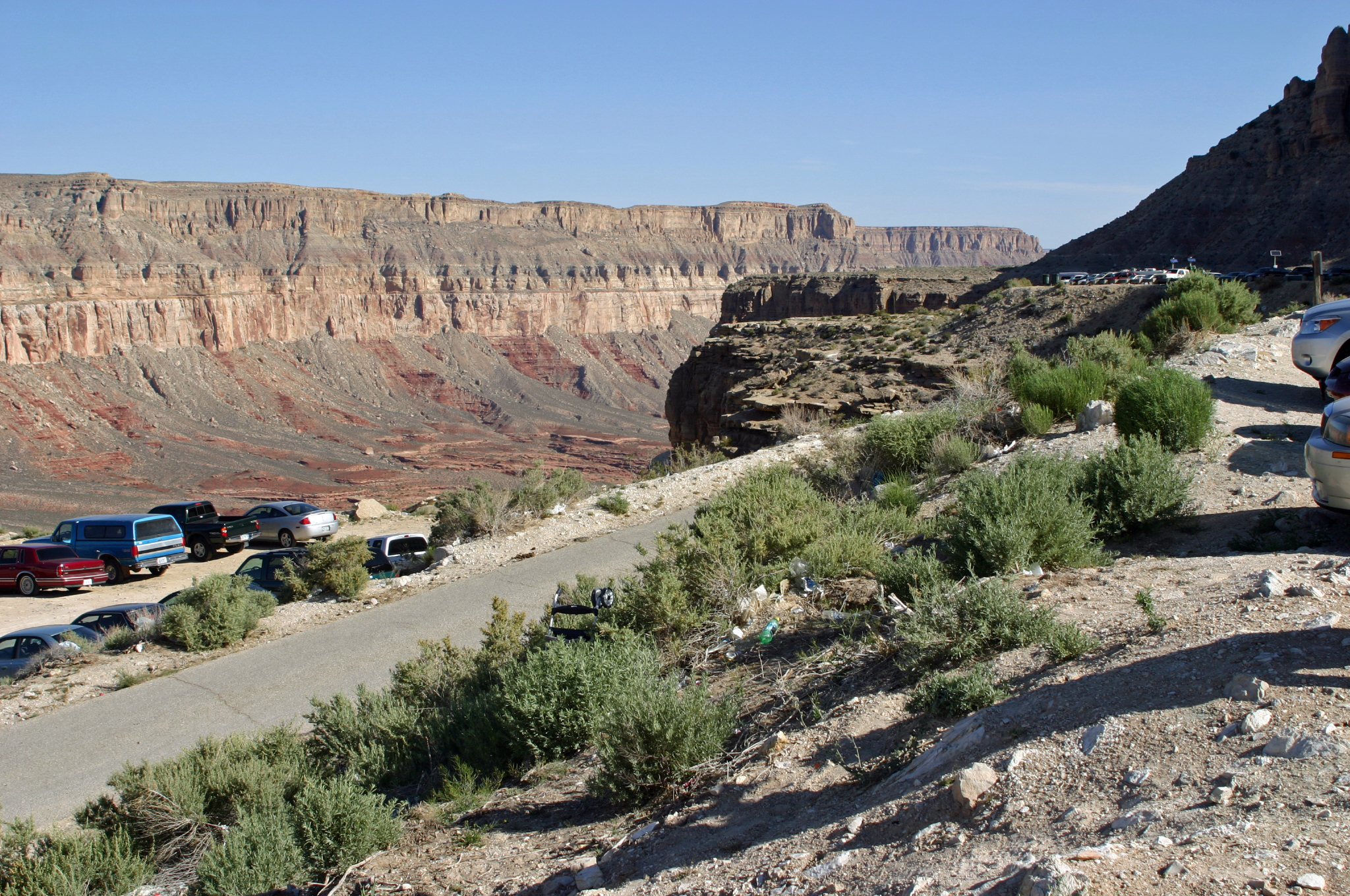
Parking at Hualapai Hilltop, the trailhead for the 8-mile (13 km) trail into Supai.

Supai can be reached by hiking 8 miles (13 km), descending 2,004 feet (611 m) in elevation from Hualapai Hilltop through the Hualapai Canyon. Helicopters also fly from Hualapai Hilltop into Supai. Hualapai Hilltop, the trailhead for Havasupai Trail, is located about 70 miles (110 km) from the community of Peach Springs, along paved BIA Road 18.

== Education ==
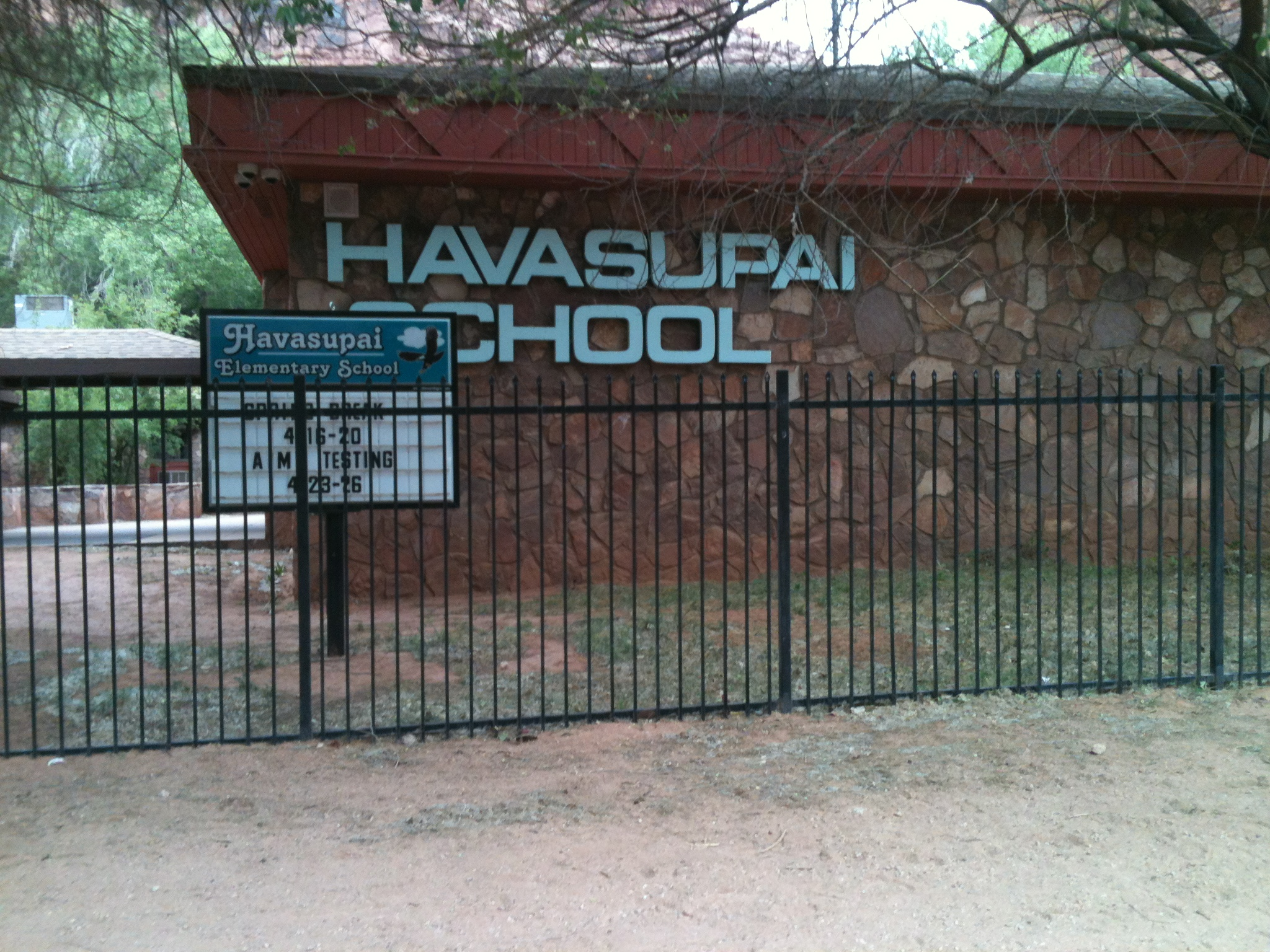
Havasupai Elementary School

There is one K–8 school in Supai, Havasupai Elementary School, run by the Bureau of Indian Education. Additionally, by 1970 there was a Head Start program in Supai.

Supai lacks a high school. In 1988, Havasupai ES was K-8, and residents went to boarding schools after the 8th grade. The most common boarding school, that year, was Sherman Indian High School in Riverside, California. In 1967, most older students (past the second grade, the upper grade at Havasupai ES at the time) attended school in Fort Apache or Phoenix. In that time period some students went to boarding schools in California. Some other students stayed with host families and attended school district-operated public schools. Prior to its closure, the Phoenix Indian School was the closest Native American boarding high school to Supai.

According to Coconino County's parcel viewer, Supai is in the "Unorganized School District #00". According to Arizona law, an unorganized school district is one that does not have a high school. The 2010 U.S. census school district map for Coconino County shows Supai as in "School District Not Defined". Areas not in school districts are under the jurisdiction of the respective County Superintendent of Schools.

== Culture ==
Reggae music is popular in the Supai community; according to Afropop, the residents feel "a kinship with the Rastafarian faith". According to Cannabis Culture, Bob Marley had wanted to visit but died before he could make the trip. Tyrone Downie and Cedelia Booker learned of the popularity of the music after Chris Blackwell encountered several Supai residents in a Las Vegas record store buying reggae and helicoptered into Supai in 1982 with a grand piano and played a concert.

In 1984 an Arizona reggae band, Shagnatty, gave a concert; a photojournalist accompanying the band reported residents told her the music had been popular in the community for as long as 25 years, when visitors from California had introduced it. She describes community members joining the band on stage and toasting in Supai.

== Tourism ==
Tourism is economically important. When COVID-19 shut down area tourism, the tribe estimated a 60-day closure of tourism to Supai would result in a 15% loss to the tribe's annual revenues.

As of 2014, approximately 20,000 people visit each year, most to see and hike around Havasu Falls and other nearby waterfalls. There is a campground and Havasupai Lodge in Supai on tribal grounds, and a National Park Service campground and Phantom Ranch outside of Supai on national park grounds.

== Services ==
Supai has one small, air-conditioned lodge (Havasupai Lodge), a convenience store and a cafe.

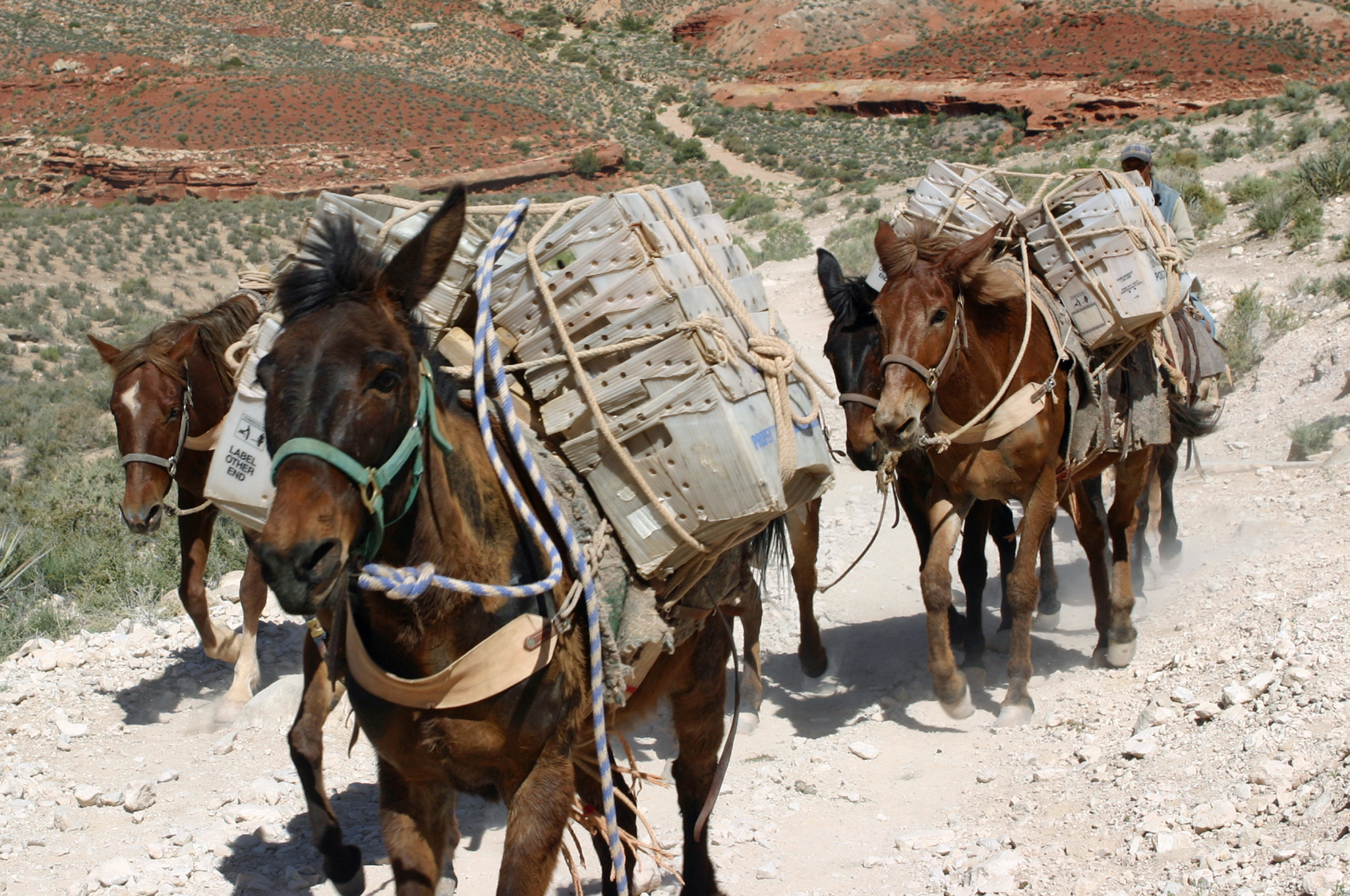
Mule train from Supai carrying U.S. Postal Service boxes

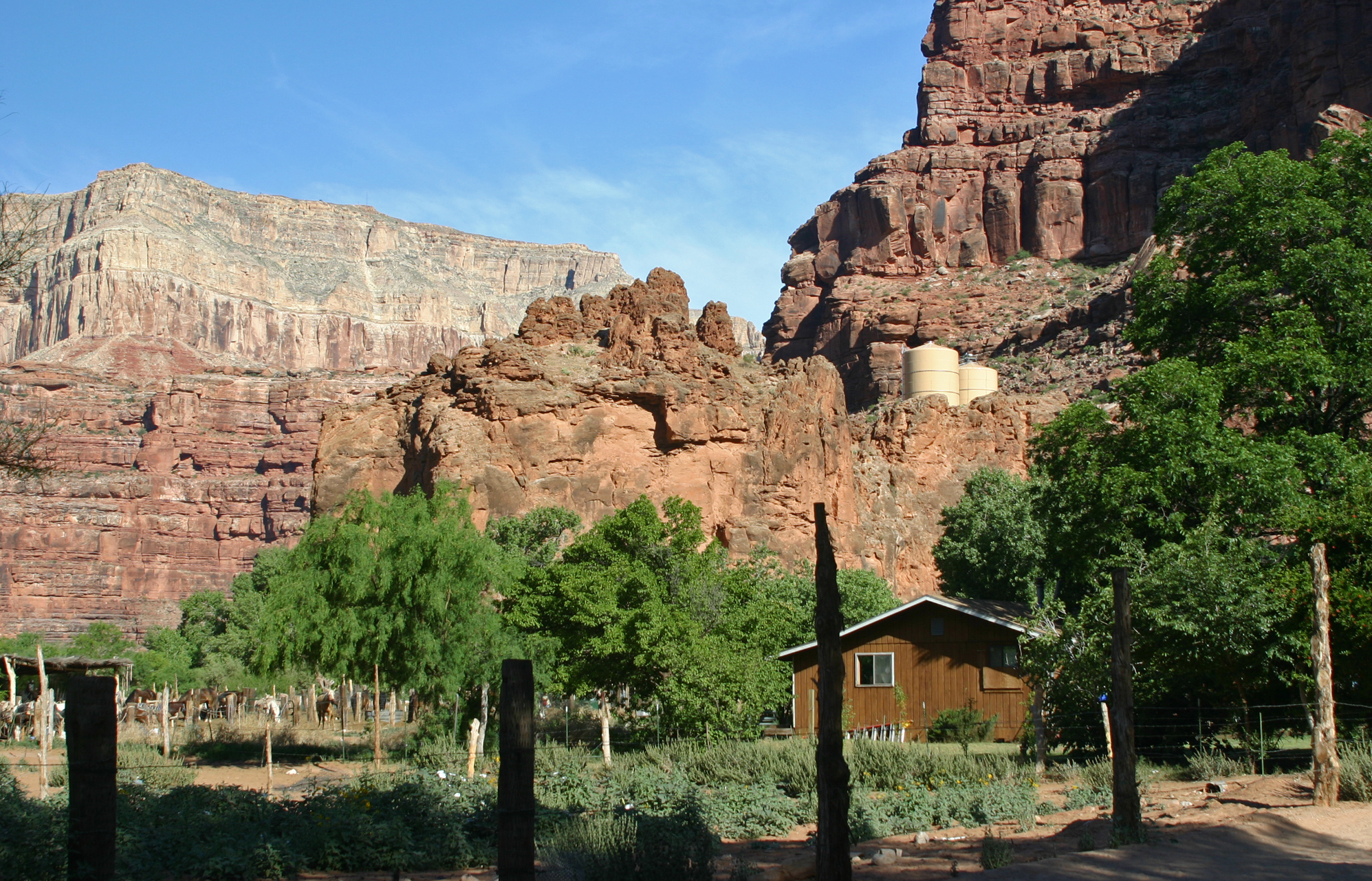
Water tanks above the village, supplying water pressure for plumbing

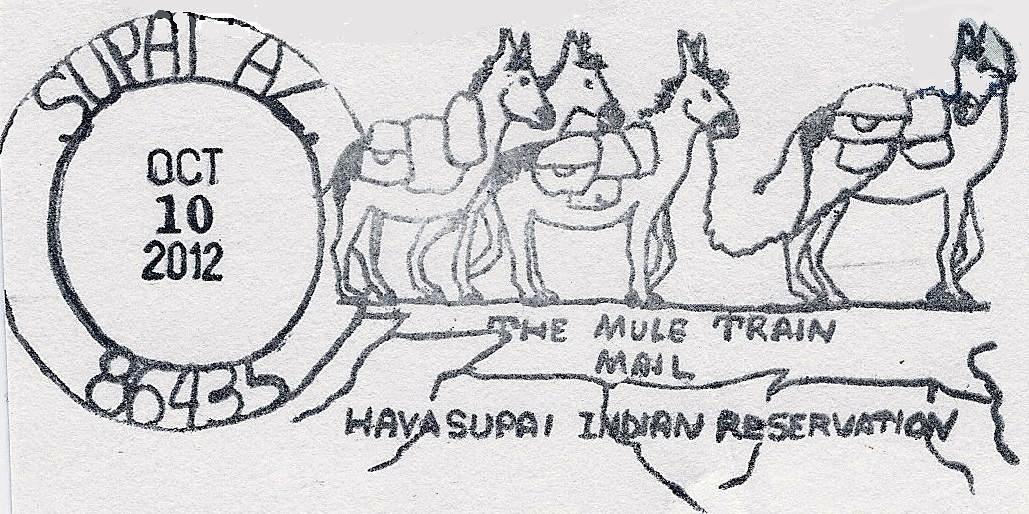
Supai AZ postmark, unique for its "mule train" design

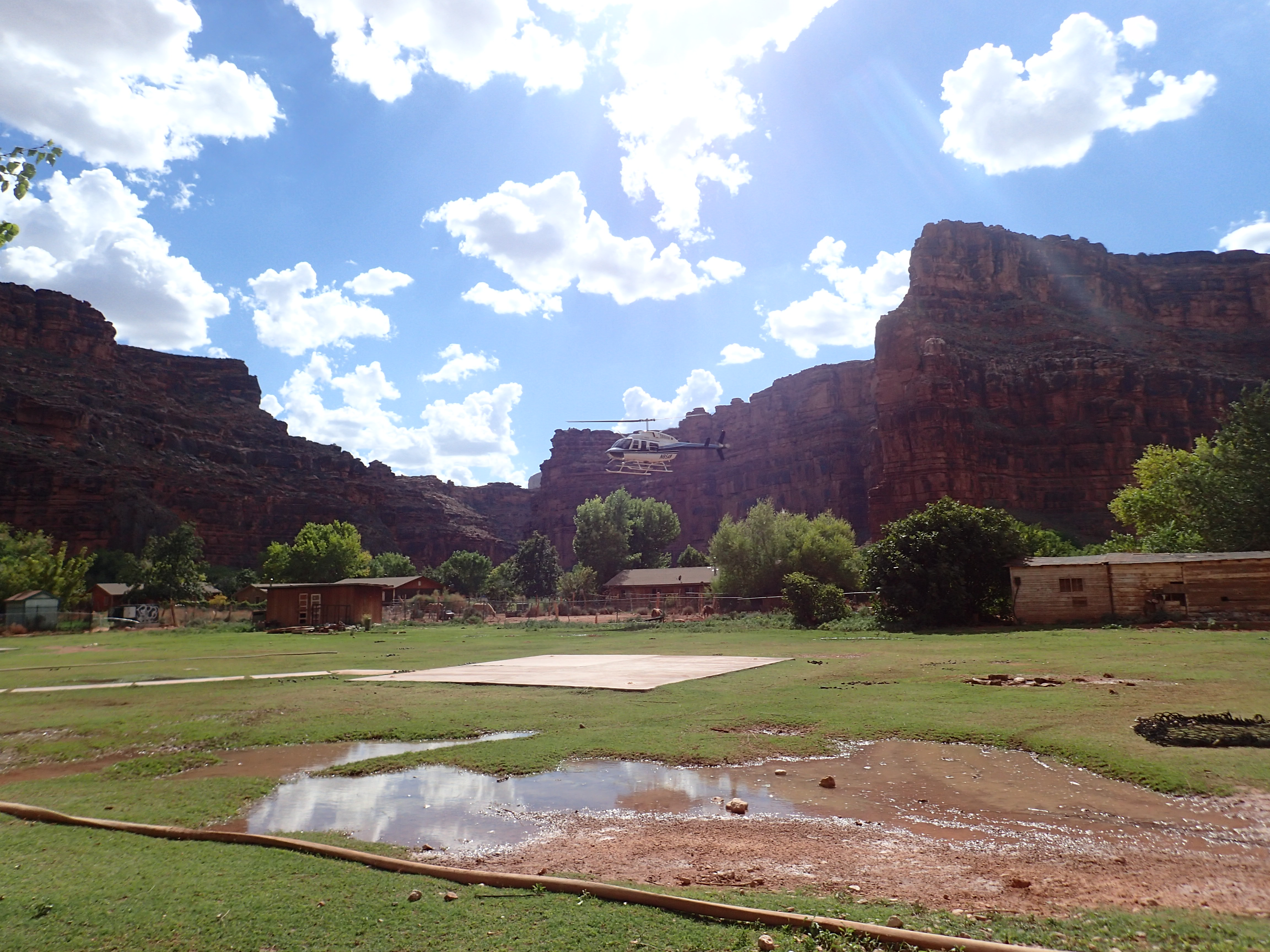
Helicopter and helipad
