= Havasupai–Hualapai language =

Pai language spoken in Arizona, US

Havasupai–Hualapai
- Havasupai, Upland Yuman
- Region: Arizona, United States
- Ethnicity: 570 Havasupai, 1,870 Walapai (2007)
- Native speakers: Hualapai: about 1,000, all ages (2015 census); Over 500 Havasupai, all ages (2007)
- Language family: Yuman–Cochimí: Core Yuman; Pai; Havasupai–Hualapai
- Dialects: Havasupai; Hualapai
- Writing system: Latin

Language codes
- ISO 639-3: yuf Havasupai‑Walapai‑Yavapai
- Glottolog: hava1248 Havasupai‑Walapai‑Yavapai
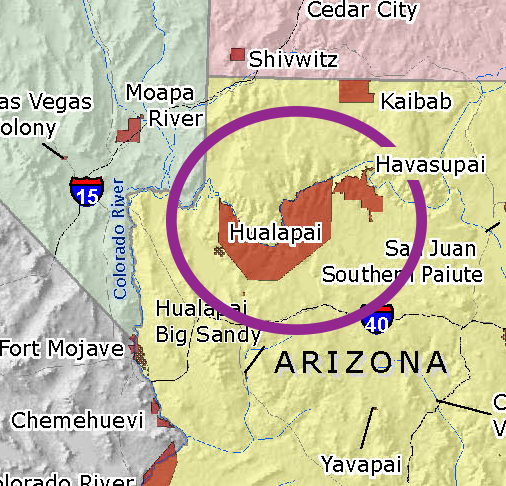
- The Hualapai and Havasupai reservations are circled on this map in purple, where most speakers of the language live.

Havasupai–Hualapai (Havasupai–Walapai) is a Native American language spoken by the Hualapai and Havasupai peoples of northwestern Arizona. Havasupai–Hualapai belongs to the Pai branch of the Yuman–Cochimí language family, together with its close relative Yavapai and with Paipai, a language spoken in northern Baja California. There are two main dialects of this language: the Havasupai dialect is spoken in the bottom of the Grand Canyon, while the Hualapai dialect is spoken along the southern rim. As of 2010, there were approximately 1500 speakers of Havasupai-Hualapai. UNESCO classifies the Havasupai dialect as endangered and the Hualapai dialect as vulnerable. There are efforts at preserving both dialects through bilingual education programs.

== Regional variation and mutual intelligibility ==
The modern Hualapai and Havasupai have separate sociopolitical identities, but a consensus among linguists is that the differences in speech among them lie only at the dialect level, rather than constituting separate languages, and the differences between the two dialects have been reported as "negligible".

The language even bears similarity to Yavapai, and sometimes they are grouped together for means of linguistic classification (see Ethnologue). Regarding the relationship of Havasupai and Hualapai to Yavapai, Warren Gazzam, a Tolkapaya Yavapai speaker, reported that "they (Hualapais) speak the same language as we do, some words or accents are a little different".

== Phonology ==
=== Consonants ===
For illustrative purposes, the following chart is the consonant inventory of the Hualapai dialect of the language, which varies slightly from the Havasupai dialect. Because the two dialects have different orthographies, IPA symbols are used here. For more information about how these sounds are depicted in writing, see the Orthography section of this page.

Consonant sounds in the Havasupai–Hualapai language
| | | Bilabial | Labio- dental | Dental | Alveolar | Palatal | Velar | | Uvular | | Glottal |
| | | Bilabial | Labio- dental | Dental | Alveolar | Palatal | plain | lab. | plain | lab. | Glottal |
|---|---|---|---|---|---|---|---|---|---|---|---|
| Nasal | | m | | | n | ɲ | ŋ | | | | |
| Plosive/ Affricate | plain | p | | t̪ | t | t͡ʃ | k | kʷ | q | qʷ | ʔ |
| Plosive/ Affricate | aspirated | pʰ | | t̪ʰ | tʰ | t͡ʃʰ | kʰ | | | | |
| Fricative | | β | f, v | θ | s | | | | | | h |
| Flap | | | | | ɾ | | | | | | |
| Approximant | | w | | | l | j | | | | | |

As shown from the chart above, aspiration is a contrastive feature in many stops and affricates in Hualapai-Havasupai. Often, consonant sounds are realized in different ways in different phonetic environments. For example, if a glottal stop occurs at the beginning of a word, it may sometimes be replaced by a vowel such as /a/.

The phonemic difference between /β/ and /v/ is widely discussed in the literature. Watahomigie et al. poses that the use of /β/ is attributed to older generations of Hualapai dialect speakers, and Edwin Kozlowski notes that in the Hualapai dialect, [v] is weakened to [β] in weak-stressed syllables. Thus, the underlying form /v-ul/ "to ride" surfaces as [βəʔul].

Long and short vowels are contrastive in the language. The following is a minimal pair illustrating of the phonemic contrast of Havasupai-Hualapai vowel length: pa:ʔ 'person' vs. paʔ 'arrow'.

Vowel phonemes
| | Front | Central | Back |
|---|---|---|---|
| Close | i iː | | u uː |
| Mid | e eː | | o oː |
| Open | æ æː | a aː | |

Short vowels may sometimes be reduced to [ə] or dropped completely when they occur in an unstressed syllable, primarily in a word-initial context. In addition to this chart, there are four attested diphthongs that are common for this language: /aʊ/ as in 'cow', /aɪ/ as in 'lie', /eɪ/ as in 'they', and /ui/ as in 'buoy'.

=== Stress ===
Havasupai-Hualapai's prosodic system is stress-timed, which governs many parts of the phonological structure of the language, including where long vowels occur, what kind of consonant clusters can occur and where, and how syllable boundaries are divided. There are three types of stress: primary, secondary, and weak. All vowels can have any of these three types of stress, but syllabic consonants can only have weak stress. Primary stresses occur at regularly timed intervals in an utterance. Secondary stresses occur according to an alternating-stress system, which most commonly dictates that two secondary stresses follow a primary stressed (phonetically long) vowel.

=== Syllabic structure ===
The most common syllable structures that occur in Havasupai-Hualapai are CV, CVC, and VC; however, consonant clusters of two or three consonants can and do occur initially, medially, and finally.

At word boundaries, syllabification breaks up consonant clusters to CVC or CV structure as much as is possible. CCC and CCCC clusters occur, but they are always broken up by a syllable boundary (that is, C-CC/CC-C or CC-CC). Syllable-initial CC clusters are either composed of (1) /θ/, /s/, or /h/, followed by any consonant or (2) any consonant followed by /w/.

== Morphology ==
Morphologically, Hualapai-Havasupai is classified by WALS as weakly suffixing. There are different affixes for nouns, verbs, and particles in Hualapai-Havasupai, and there exist suffixes that can change nouns to verbs and vice versa. The affixes that exist—apart from word roots—are generally short in phonemic length, restricted to C, CV, VC, or V in composition.

=== Verbs ===
Verbs are marked for person (first, second, and third) through the prefixes /a-/, /ma-/, and /ø-/, respectively. Many other affixes attach to the verb to reveal information like tense, aspect, modality, number, adverbial qualities, and conjunctivity. The verb suffixes /-wi/ and /-yu/ are divisive for verbs and are weak-stressed by-forms of /wí/, meaning do, and /yú/, meaning be. These occur on all verbs. The three numbers that can be marked in verbs are singular, paucal plural, and multiple plural. There are six types of aspect, and any verb can have as many as three and as few as zero aspect markers. The six types are distributive-iterative, continued, interrupted, perfective, imperfective, and habitual.

=== Nouns ===
Nouns are marked for number, case, definiteness, and demonstrativeness, as can be seen by the lists of noun suffixes and prefixes below:

- Noun prefixes
  - Subordinate: /-ɲi/ 'subordinate to, related to'
  - Intensive: /vi-/ 'very, just'
- Noun suffixes
  - Number: /-t͡ʃ/ paucal plural, /-uv/ multiple plural, no affix for singular number
  - Demonstrative: /-ɲ/ that, /-v/ this
  - Definiteness: /-a/ the (a certain), /-i/ the (this other), /-u/ the (that other), /-o/, the former (that)
  - Case: /-t͡ʃ/ nominative, /-ø/ accusative, /-k/ allative-adessive, /-l/ illative-inessive, /-m/ ablative-abessive
  - Appellative: /-é/ vocative

=== Particles ===
Particles exist as interjections, adverbs, possessive pronouns, and articles. There are relatively few particles that exist in the language. They can be marked through prefixes for subordination and intensity in the same way as nouns and through the suffix /-é/, which indicates adverbial place.

== Syntax ==
=== Word order ===
Havasupai-Hualapai's basic word order is S-O-V. For noun phrases, articles, such as demonstratives, occur as suffixes.

=== Case marking ===
Havasupai-Hualapai has a nominative/accusative case marking system, as mentioned in the morphology section.

=== Noun incorporation ===
It is said that noun incorporation occurs in the language. This is notable with verbs of belonging, such as with the noun "nyigwáy(ya)," meaning "shirt." To say "to be wearing a shirt" the noun form "nyigwáy" is incorporated into the verb, appearing with a prefix for person, and suffixes for reflexiveness and auxiliaries. The noun form obligatorily also occurs before its incorporated verb form:

nyigwáy '-nyiggwa:y(-v)-wi
shirt 3/1-shirt(-REFL)-AUX
"I have a shirt on."

Similar processes occur with kinship terms and verbs of belonging such as with the following noun "bi:", which means "female's brother's child/nephew/niece":

e'e '-bi:-v-wi
yes 3/1-nephew-REFL-AUX
"Yes, I have a nephew/niece."

This can be considered a more iconic form of noun incorporation, as the noun does not also occur outside the incorporate verb form.

=== Switch-reference ===
Havasupai-Hualapai, like other Yuman languages, is known for its switch-reference. This is a mechanism that illustrates whether the subjects are the same for multiple verbs within a sentence. The marker "-k" states that the subject-references are identical, and the marker "-m" is used when the first and second subjects are different for two verbs. The following sentences are examples of each, with the markers bolded for illustrative purposes:

Identical subject-reference "-k"

Rhiannon-ch he'-h tuy-k dathgwi:l-k-wi-ny
Rhiannon-SUBJ dress-DEM {3/3.take off}-SS 3/3.wash-SS-AUX-PAST
"Rhiannon took off the dress and washed it.

Note that in the following sentence, both subject markers are used:

Different subject-reference "-m"

John(a)-ch Mary baeq-m mi:-k-i-ny
John-SUBJ Mary 3/3.hit-DS 3.cry-SS-AUX-PAST
"John hit Mary and she (Mary) cried."

== Orthography ==
Havasupai and Hualapai have developed separate orthographies in order to distinguish the two tribes socially and culturally. Hualapai's orthography was developed in the 1970s partly as an effort to preserve the language for pedagogical and historical purposes. Both of the orthographies are adapted from the Latin Script.

Hualapai alphabet (1979)
| Orthography | a | ae | b | d | đ | e | f | g | h | i | j | k | l | m | n | o | p | q | s | t | ŧ | u | v | w | y | ’ |
|---|---|---|---|---|---|---|---|---|---|---|---|---|---|---|---|---|---|---|---|---|---|---|---|---|---|---|
| IPA | a | æ | p | t ɾ | t̪ | e | f | k | h | i | t͡ʃ | kʰ | l | m | n | o | pʰ | q | s | tʰ | t̪ʰ | u | v β | w | j | ʔ |

⟨d⟩ represents both /t/ and /ɾ/, and ⟨v⟩ represents both /v/ and /β/. ⟨ae⟩ is the only digraph that is included in the alphabet, although there are others. The following graphs are not part of the alphabet:

| Orthography | a: | ae: | e: | i: | o: | u: | aw | ay | ey | uy | ch | ny | ng | th |
|---|---|---|---|---|---|---|---|---|---|---|---|---|---|---|
| IPA | aː | æː | eː | iː | oː | uː | aʊ | aɪ | eɪ | ui | t͡ʃʰ | ɲ | ŋ | θ |

Havasupai has the extra letter 𝽎 (n̶) for /ŋ/.

== Havasupai dialect ==
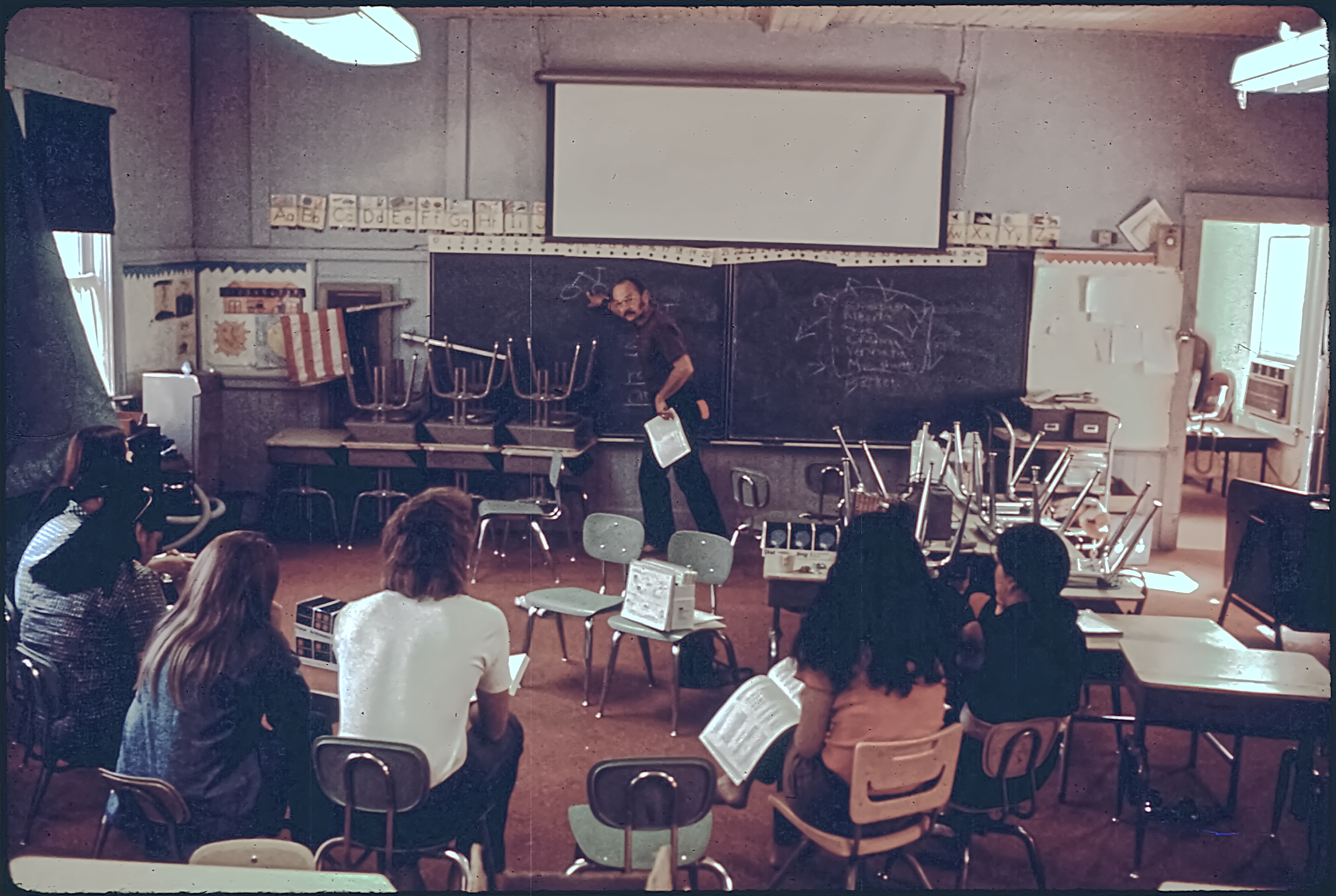
Havasupai language class.

This dialect is spoken by approximately 639 people on the Havasupai Indian Reservation at the bottom of the Grand Canyon. According to a 2015 New York Times article, it was considered the only Native American language in the United States spoken by 100% of its tribal members. Also as of 2005, Havasupai remained the first language of residents of Supai Village, the tribal government seat.

The Lord's Prayer, John 3:16, and hymns were printed in Havasupai in 1934.

As of 2004, "a Wycliffe Bible Translators project ... under way to translate the Old and the New Testaments into the Havasupai language" was progressing slowly. The project was started around 1978.

== See also ==
- Havasu 'Baaja, the people generally called Havasupai by English-speakers.

== Bibliography ==
- Campbell, Lyle (1997). American Indian Languages: The Historical Linguistics of Native America. Oxford University Press.
- Goddard, Ives (1996). "Introduction". In Goddard, Ives (ed.). Handbook of North American Indians. Vol. 17: Languages. Washington, DC: Smithsonian Institution. pp. 1–16.
- Kendall, Martha B. (1983). "Yuman languages". In Ortiz, Alfonso (ed.). Handbook of North American Indians. Vol. 10: Southwest. Washington, DC: Smithsonian Institution. pp. 4–12.
- Kozlowski, Edwin (1976). "Remarks on Havasupai phonology". International Journal of American Linguistics. 42 (2): 140–149. doi:10.1086/465402. S2CID 144426997.
- Langdon, Margaret (1996). "Bibliography of the Yuman languages". Survey of California and Other Indian Languages. 9: 135–159.
- Mithun, Marianne (1999). The Languages of Native North America. Cambridge: Cambridge University Press.
- Miyaoka, Osahito; Sakiyama, Osamu; Krauss, Michael E. (2007). The vanishing languages of the Pacific rim. Oxford: Oxford University Press. ISBN 978-0199266623. OCLC 252684427.
- Wares, Alan C. (1968). A Comparative Study of Yuman Consonantism. Janua Linguarum, Series Practica. Vol. 57. The Hauge: Mouton. doi:10.1515/9783111659077. ISBN 978-3-11-127469-0.
- Redden, James E. (1965). Walapai Phonology and Morphology. Indiana University.
- Redden, James E. (1966a). "Walapai I: Phonology". International Journal of American Linguistics. 32 (1): 1–16. doi:10.1086/464875. JSTOR 1263444. S2CID 143497172.
- Redden, James E. (1966b). "Walapai II: Morphology". International Journal of American Linguistics. 32 (2): 141–163. doi:10.1086/464892. JSTOR 1263689. S2CID 144260487.
- Watahomigie, Lucille J.; Bender, Jorigine; Watahomigie, Philbert, Sr.; Yamamoto, Akira Y. (1982). Hualapai Reference Grammar. LosAngeles: American Indian Studies Center, UCLA.
- Watahomigie, Lucille J.; Bender, Jorigine; Watahomigie, Philbert, Sr.; Yamamoto, Akira Y. (2001). Hualapai Reference Grammar. ELPR Publications. Vol. A2-003. Kyoto: Endangered Languages of the Pacific Rim Project. ISBN 0935626077.
- Watahomigie, Lucille J.; Bender, Jorigine; Powskey, Malinda; Steele, Josie; Watahomigie, Philbert, Sr.; Yamamoto, Akira Y. (2003). A Dictionary of the Hualapai Language. ELPR Publications. Vol. A2-041. Kyoto: Endangered Languages of the Pacific Rim Project. OCLC 54432923.
