= List of historic properties in Flagstaff, Arizona =

- City
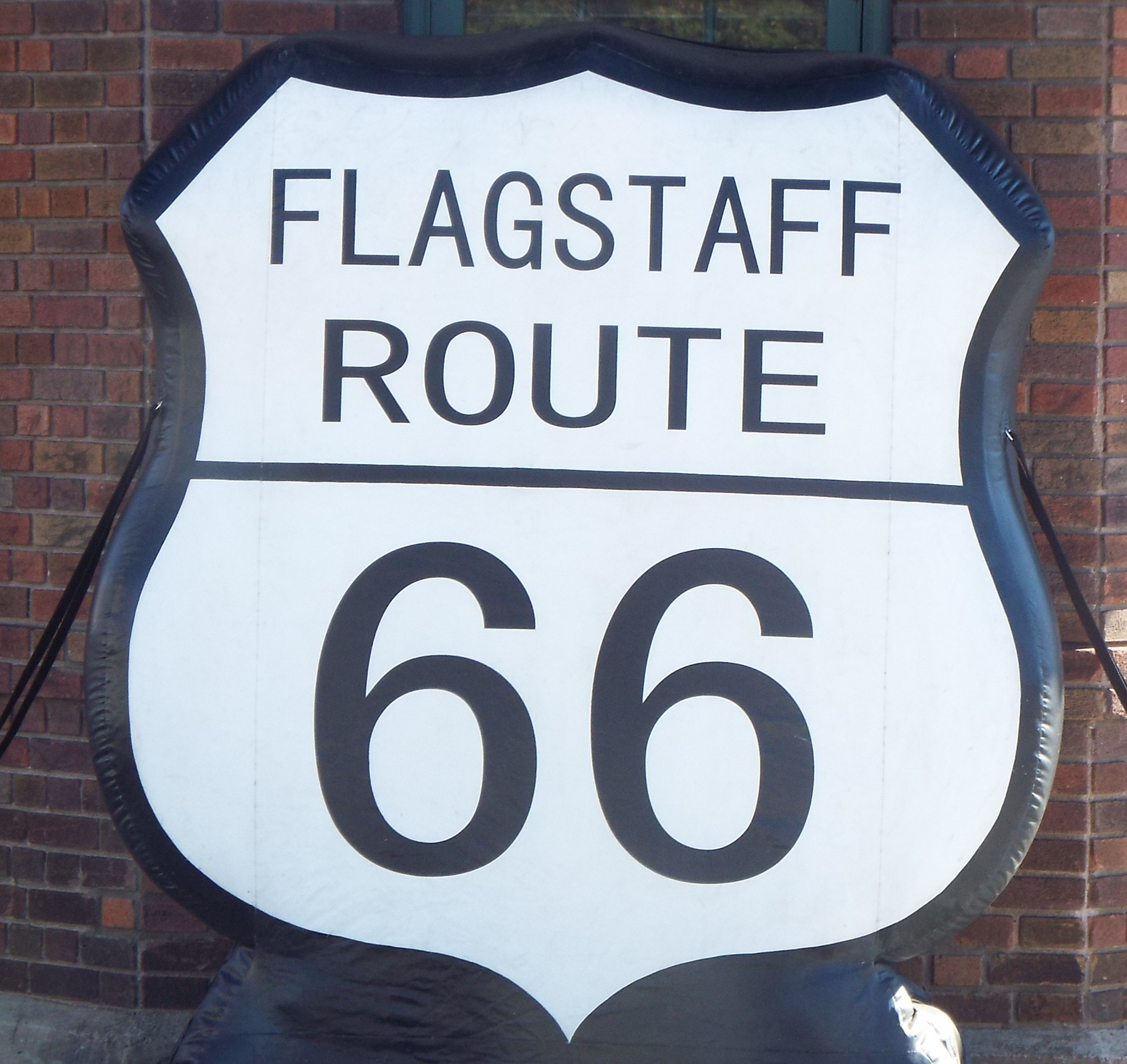
- Flagstaff Route 66 sign

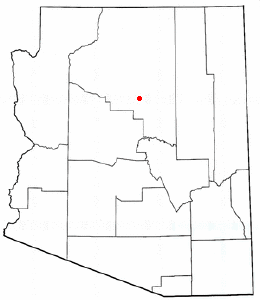
- Map of Flagstaff in the Coconino County of the state of Arizona

This is a list, which includes a photographic gallery, of some of the remaining historic buildings, houses, bridges, structures and monuments in Flagstaff, Arizona, some of which are listed in the National Register of Historic Places (NRHP). Also included is a photographic gallery of the Two Spot Logging Train which is listed in the NRHP and the Flagstaff Station.

== Brief history ==
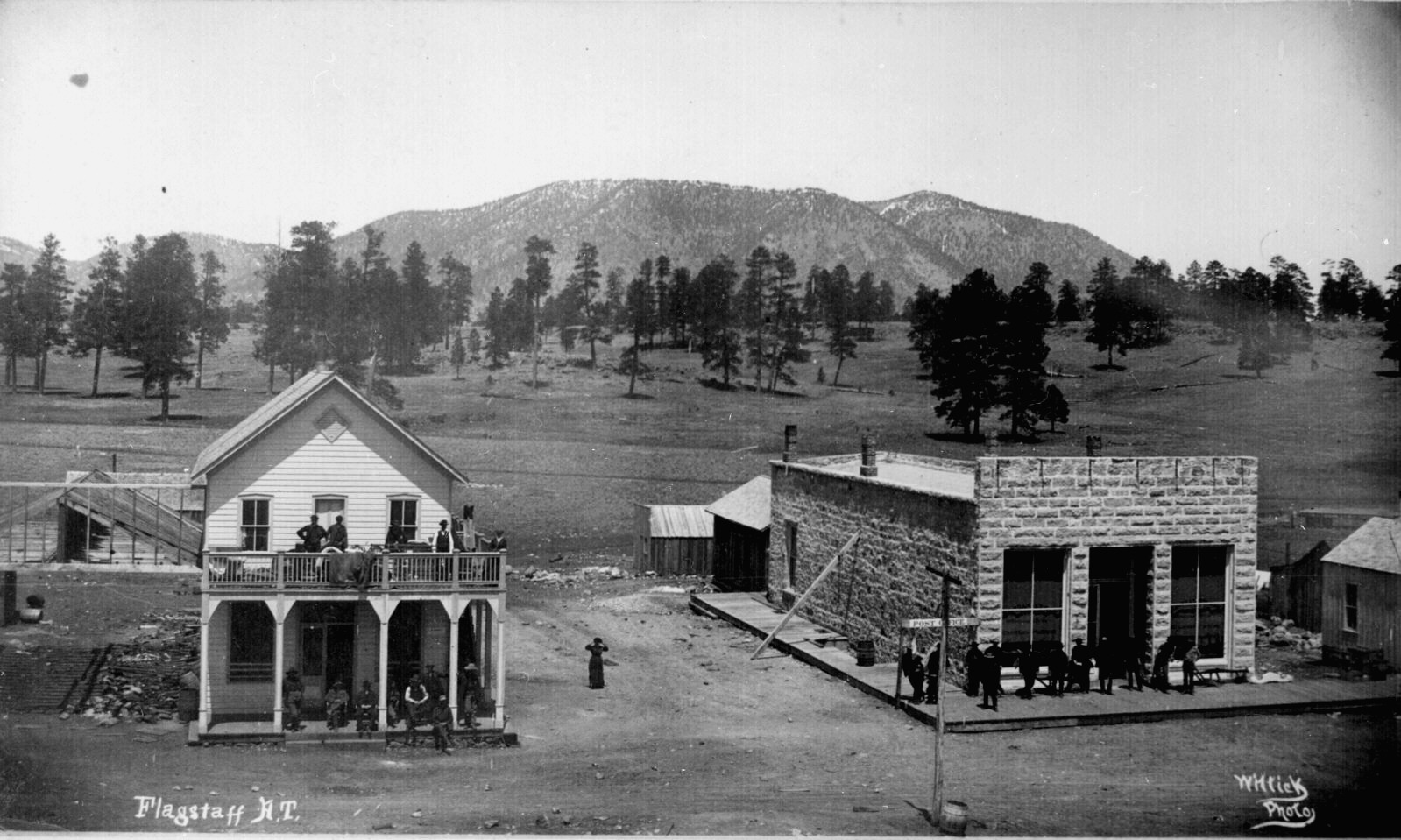
Flagstaff c. 1899; view of Post Office and other buildings on Terrace Street

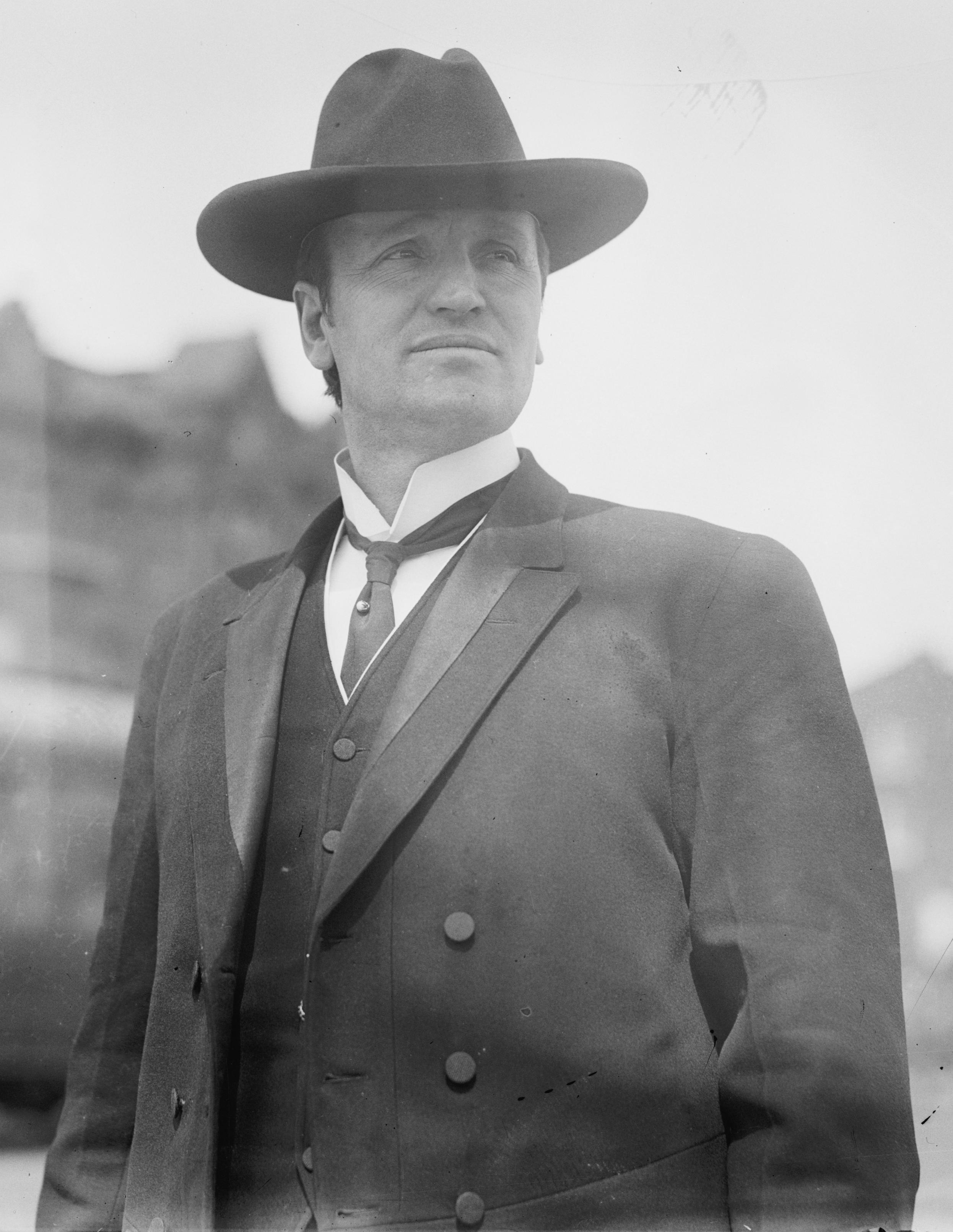
Henry F. Ashurst

The first person, who was not a Native-American, to settle the area was Thomas F. McMillan. His cabin at the base of Mars Hill is listed in the National Register of Historic Places. The Santa Fe Railroad built a town nearby which they named Flagstaff and during the 1880s, the town opened its first post office. The origins of the town name of Flagstaff came about when on July 4, 1855, a surveyor for the Santa Fe Railroad by the name of Samuel Clark Hudson, accompanied by his team, climbed a tall pine tree and tied a flag.

Flagstaff's early economy was based on the lumber, railroad, and ranching industries. The Riordan family were a pioneering family who played an instrumental role in the development of the lumber and timber industry in the town. They founded and established the Arizona Lumber and Timber Company in 1900. The company office as well as the logging train used and the family estate are all listed in the National Register of Historic Places.

The house of Henry F. Ashurst, built in 1892, is among the houses listed in the National Register of Historic Places. On March 27, 1912, Ashurst became one of the first two senators from new state of Arizona to be elected to the United States Senate. Among the other historic houses listed in the NRHP of Flagstaff's early pioneers are that of Hugh E. Campbell. Campbell began his career as a sheepherder in 1885. He was one of the owners of the firm named Campbell-Francis and Co., the largest sheep ranchers in Arizona. Also listed is the home of J.C. Milligan, a former Justice of the Peace and owner of a local brickyard, is also listed.

Mexicans and people of Mexican ancestry were also instrumental in the development of the new city. One of the businesses which catered to the Hispanic community of the area was the "La Cuidad de Mexico Grocery" (The City of Mexico Grocery). "La Iglesia Metodista El Divino Redentor" (The Mexican Methodist Church The Divine Redeemer), established in 1892 and the "Iglesia Nuestra Seňora de la Guadalupe" (Our Lady of Guadalupe Church) are both churches founded by the Mexican community. Segregation in schools was common in the United States at the time. Such was the case of the South Beaver Elementary School, built in 1936, which served as a segregated school for Hispanic students and later for African-American students until the 1950s.

The now historic Route 66, which runs through Flagstaff, was completed in 1926. Flagstaff was incorporated as a city in 1928. The establishment of Route 66 was one of the factors which contributed to the growth of the city. People who emigrated to the western part of the United States and tourists from different parts of the country often stopped and visited the city. As a consequence many hotels were built, among them was the Monte Vista Hotel, which was built in 1926 and is located at 100 N. San Francisco Street. The hotel was host to notable figures such as Jane Russell, Gary Cooper, Spencer Tracy, John Wayne, Bing Crosby and President Harry S. Truman.

The Lowell Observatory, an astronomical observatory founded in 1894, by astronomer Percival Lowell is also located in Flagstaff. It is among the oldest observatories in the United States. In 1965, the observatory was designated a National Historic Landmark. The dwarf planet Pluto was discovered in 1930 by Clyde Tombaugh the Lowell Observatory.

Flagstaff has a historical preservation agency called the Heritage Preservation Commission. The mission of this commission is to identify and preserve historical structures. The commission is also in charge of nominating those structures which are considered historical to be listed in the National Register of Historic Places. The Heritage Preservation Commission of Flagstaff meets in the Council Chambers located in City Hall. However, the fact that a property is listed in the NRHP does not mean that the property is safe from being demolished by its owner as was the case of the I.B. Koch House which was built in 1900 and was located in 7 Riordan Road. The I.B. Koch House was demolished and the area in which it was once located was converted into an automobile parking lot for a local law firm. According to Jim McPherson, Arizona Preservation Foundation Board President:

"It is crucial that residents, private interests, and government officials act now to save these elements of our cultural heritage before it is too late."

The city has various archeological sites listed in the National Register of Historic Places which are not pictured. This is due in part to the fact that the addresses of these sites are restricted. The archeological are:

1. The Anderson Mesa Incline. Listed in the National Register of Historic Places on February 24, 1995, Ref. #95000154.

2. The Archeological Site No. AR-03-04-03-810. Listed in the National Register of Historic Places on February 24, 1995, Ref. #95000149.

3. The Archeological Site No. AR-03-04-03-811. Listed in the National Register of Historic Places on February 24, 1995, Ref. #95000150.

4. The Archeological Site No. AR-03-04-03-812. Listed in the National Register of Historic Places on February 24, 1995, Ref. #95000151.

5. The Archeological Site No. AR-03-04-05-414. Listed in the National Register of Historic Places on February 24, 1995, Ref. #95000152.

6. The Picture Canyon Archaeological Site. Listed in the National Register of Historic Places on January 10, 2008, Ref. #07001349.

7. The Ridge Ruin Archeological District. Listed in the National Register of Historic Places on April 20, 1992, Ref. #92000339.

8. The Saginaw & Manistee Camp 2. Listed in the National Register of Historic Places on February 24, 1995, Ref. #95000148.

Other historical structures in this article which are listed in the National Register of Historic Places and are not pictured are the following:

1. The Fern Mountain Ranch. Listed in the National Register of Historic Places on March 29, 1978, Ref. #78000542. Located in North of Flagstaff.

2. The D.M. Francis House. Listed in the National Register of Historic Places on April 30, 1986, Ref. #86000902. Located in 1456 Meade Lane.

3. The House at 720 Grand Canyon Avenue. Listed in the National Register of Historic Places on April 30, 1986, Ref. #86000909. Located in 720 Grand Canyon Ave.

4. The I.B. Koch House (demolished). Listed in the National Register of Historic Places on April 30, 1986, Ref. #86000901. It was located in 7 Riordan Road.

5. The Coyote Range. Listed in the National Register of Historic Places on May 14, 1984, Ref. #84000641. Located in North of Flagstaff on U.S. Route 180.

6. The Prochnow House. Listed in the National Register of Historic Places on April 30, 1986, Ref. #86000898. Located in 304 S. Elden Street.

Historical districts not pictured include the following:

1. The Fort Tuthill Historic District. Listed in the National Register of Historic Places on April 6, 2004, Ref. #04000257. Located in State Route 89A and Interstate 17.

2. The North End Historic Residential District. Listed in the National Register of Historic Places on April 30, 1986, Ref. #86000899. Roughly bounded by Hunt, San Francisco and Verde, Elm and Cherry, and Beaver and Humphreys Streets.

3. The United States Forest Service (USFS) Fort Valley Experimental Forest Station Historic District. Listed in the National Register of Historic Places on July 25, 2001, Ref. #01000002. Located in 1/3 mile (0.54 km) west of the junction of U.S. Route 180 and Bader Road.

== Historic structures pictured ==
The following is a brief description of the images of Flagstaff's historic buildings.

=== Buildings ===
- The Dean Eldredge Museum – located at 3404 E. Route 66 built in 1899
- The Lowell Observatory – located west of Flagstaff on Mars Hill
- The Museum of Northern Arizona Exhibition Building – located on 3001 N. Fort Valley Road.
- The Old Headquarters Building – located east of Flagstaff in Walnut Canyon National Monument
- The Arizona Lumber and Timber Company Office – built in 1900 and is located on 1 Riordan Road.
- The Bank Hotel, originally called "The Arizona Central Bank and Hotel" – built in 1887 and located on Route 66 and Leroux Street.
- The Weatherford Hotel – built in 1887 by John W. Weatherford. The hotel is located at 23 N. Leroux Street.
- The Hotel Monte Vista – built in 1926 and located at 100 N. San Francisco Street.
- The Coconino County Superior Courthouse – the courthouse was completed in 1894 and enlarged in 1925. It is located at 200 N. San Francisco Street.
- The C & M Garage – built in 1925 and located at 204 S. Mikes Pike.
- The Ice House – built in 1946 and located at 201 E. Birch Ave.
- The La Ciudad de Mexico Grocery Building – built in 1900 and located at 217 S. San Francisco Street.
- The South Beaver School – built in 1936 and located at 506 S. Beaver Street.
- The Flagstaff Armory – built in 1920 and located at 503 W. Clay Ave. It is now a grocery store.
- The Babbitt Brothers Building – built in 1888 and located at 12 East Aspen St.
- The Coconino Chop House – built in 1898 and located at 10 East Route 66
- The Rickets and Brooks Building – built 1911 in and located at 22 North San Francisco Street.
- The Verchamp Building – built in 1899 and located at 24 North San Francisco Street.
- The Telephone/Exchange Building – built 1909 in and located at 23 North Leroux Street.
- The Aubineau-Andreates Building – built in 1893 and located at 2 North Leroux Street in the corner of Leroux Street and Route 66.St.
- Flagstaff Post Office – Old Flagstaff Post Office built in 1917 and located in San Francisco Street.
Historic buildings
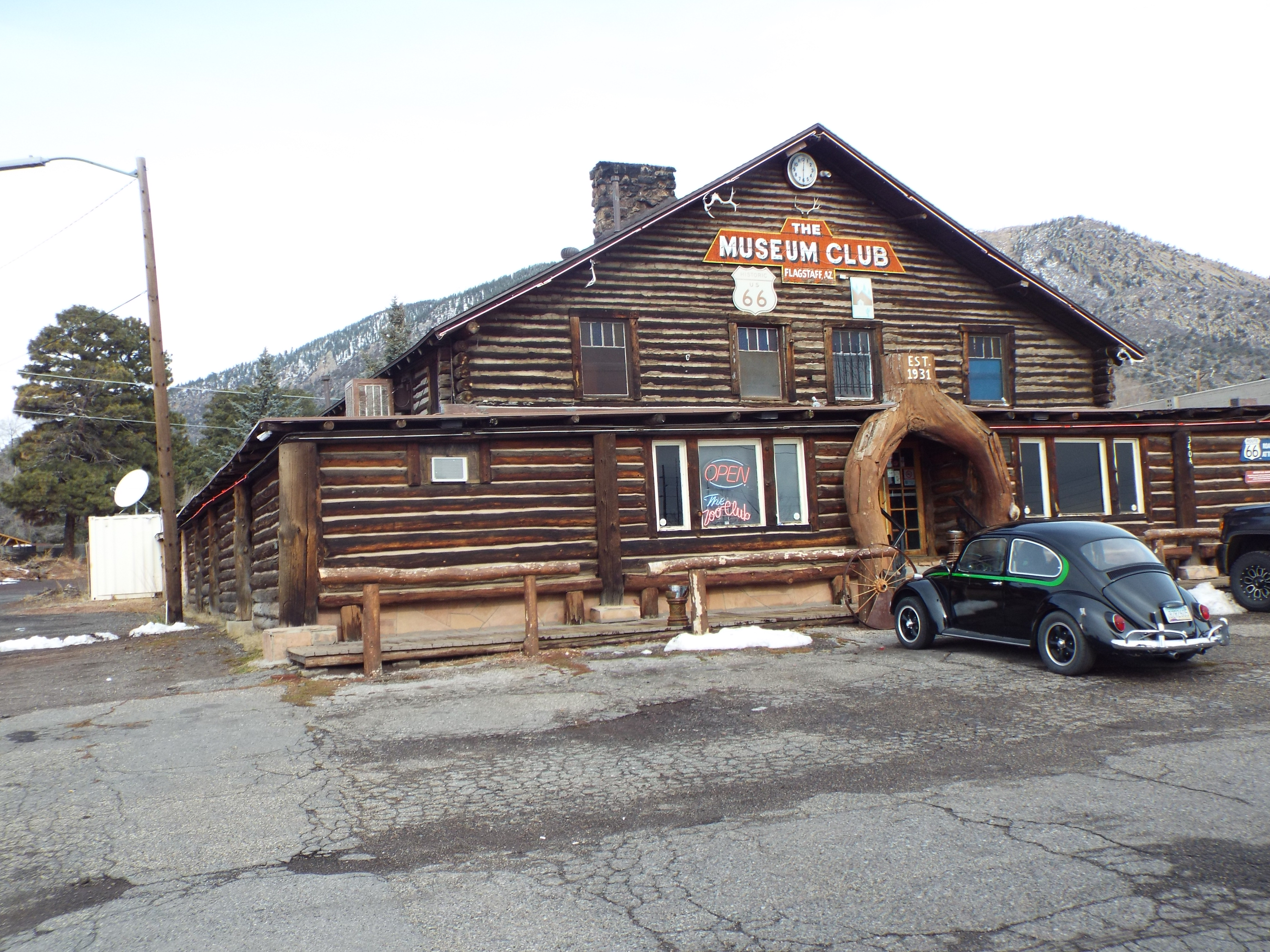
The Dean Eldredge Museum.

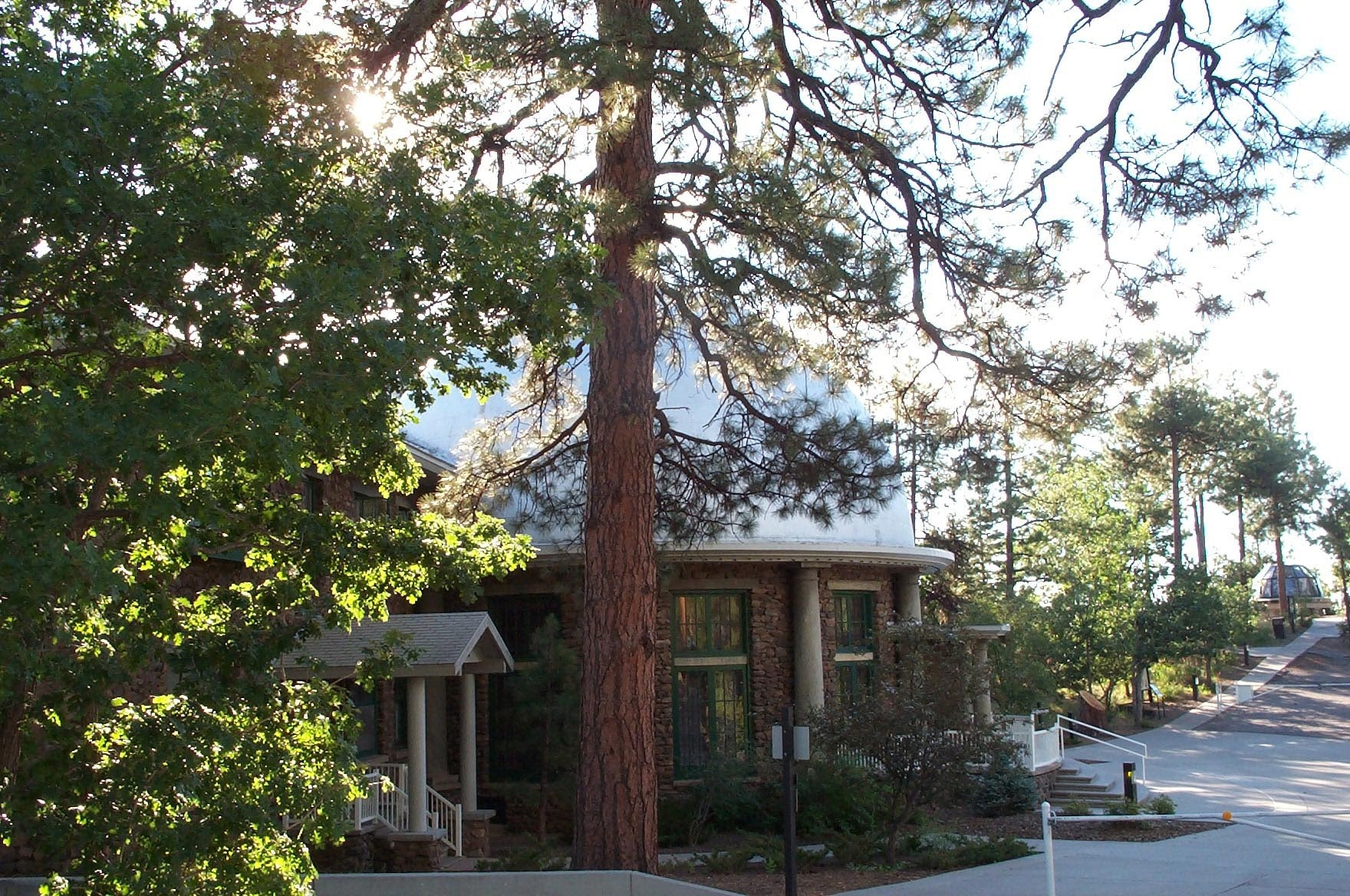
The Lowell Observatory.

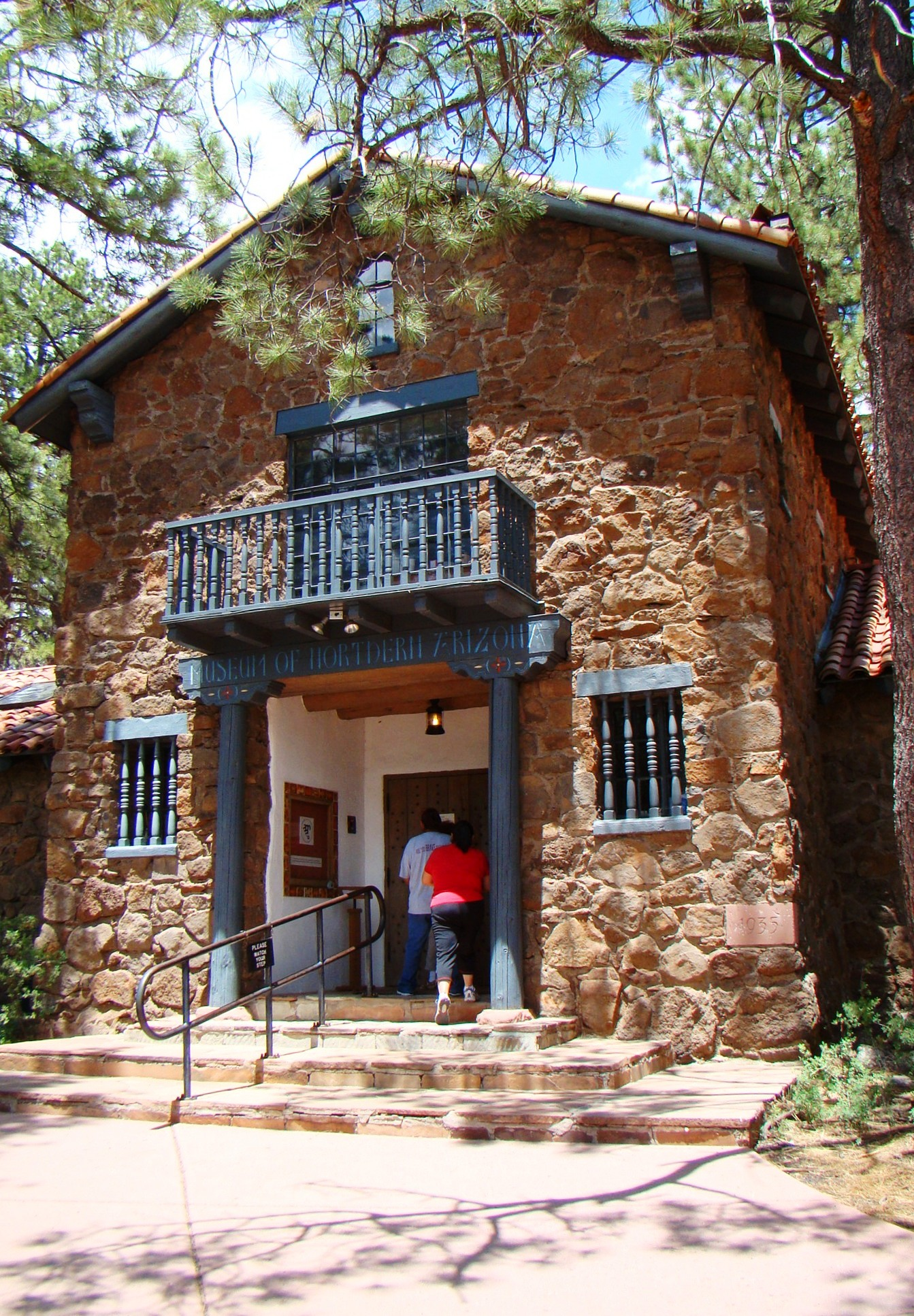
The Museum of Northern Arizona Exhibition Building.

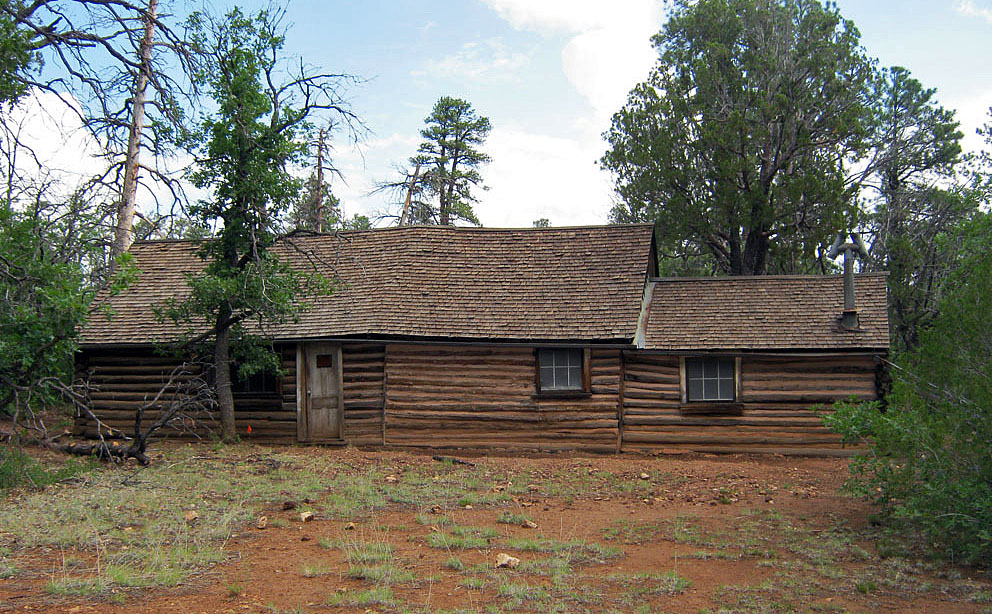
The Old Headquarters Building.

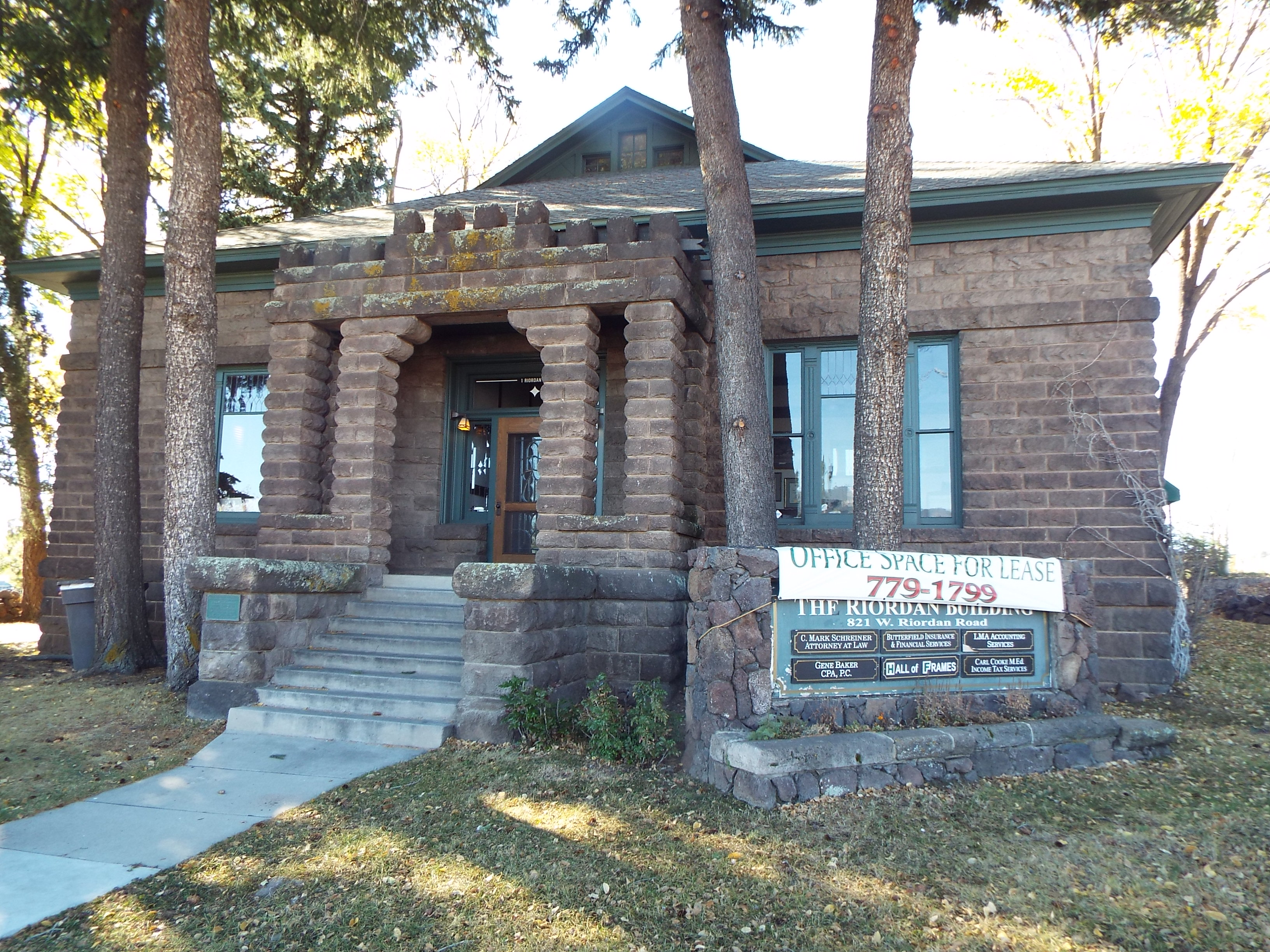
The Arizona Lumber and Timber Company Office.

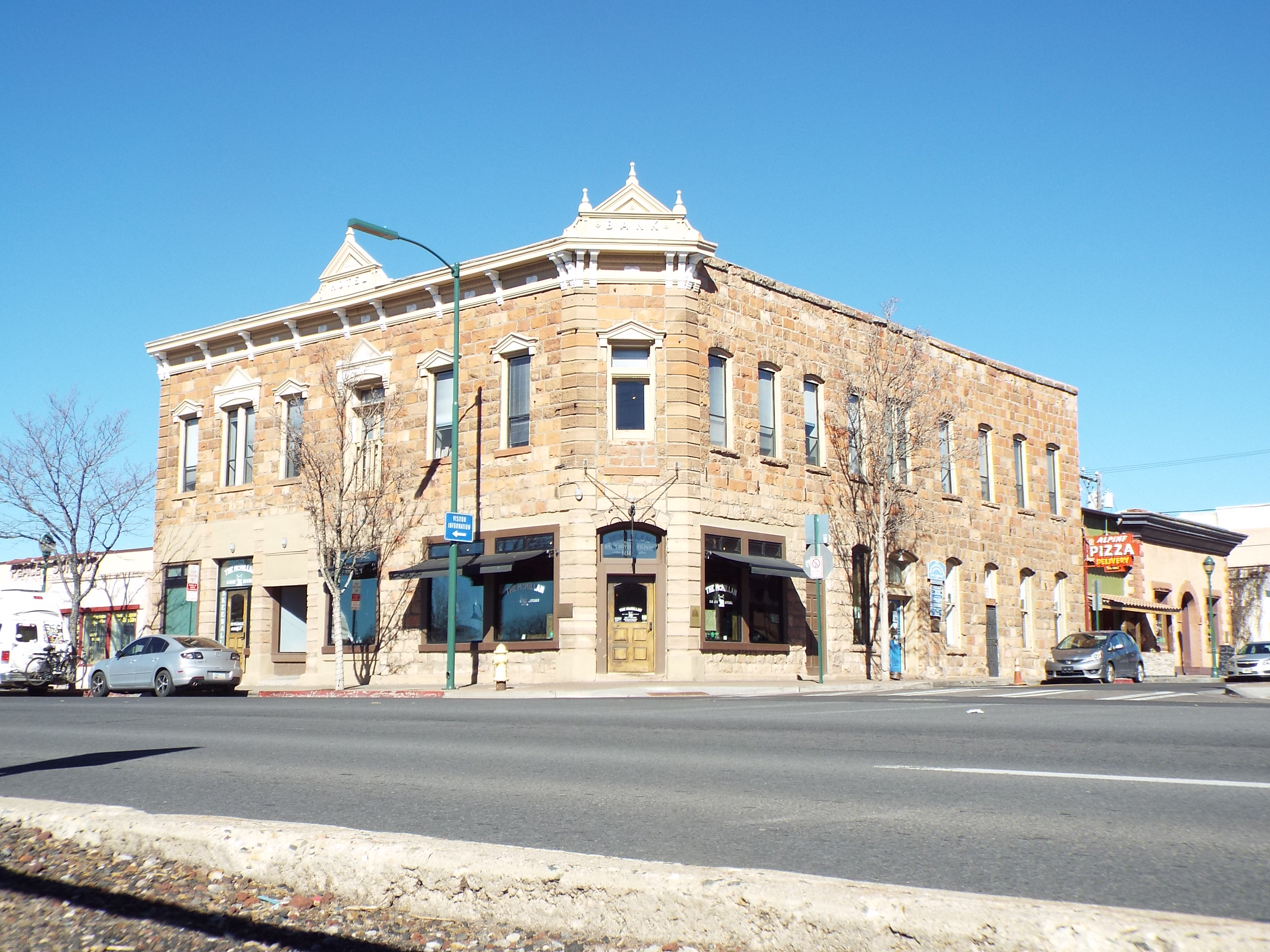
The Bank Hotel, originally called "The Arizona Central Bank and Hotel".

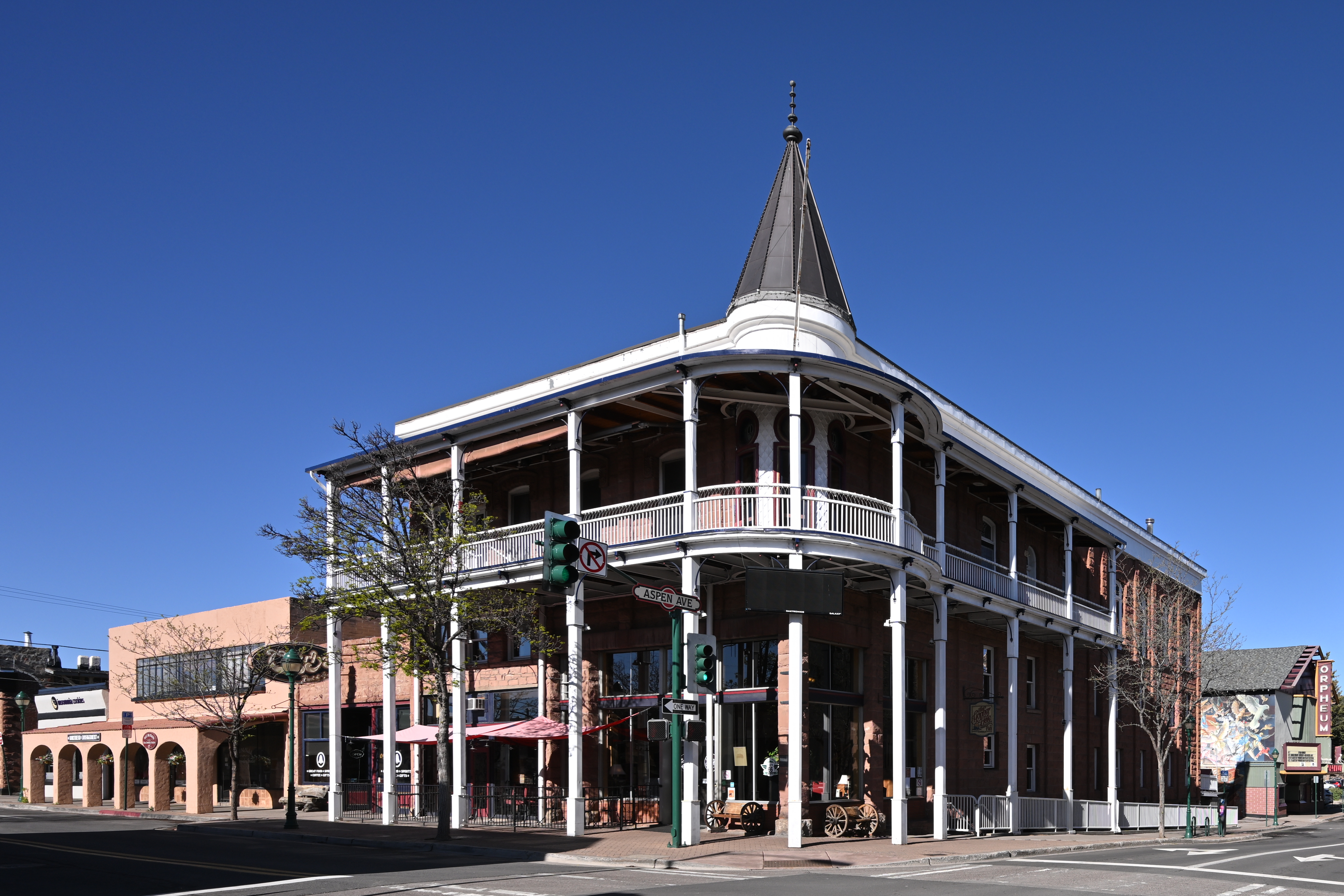
The Weatherford Hotel.

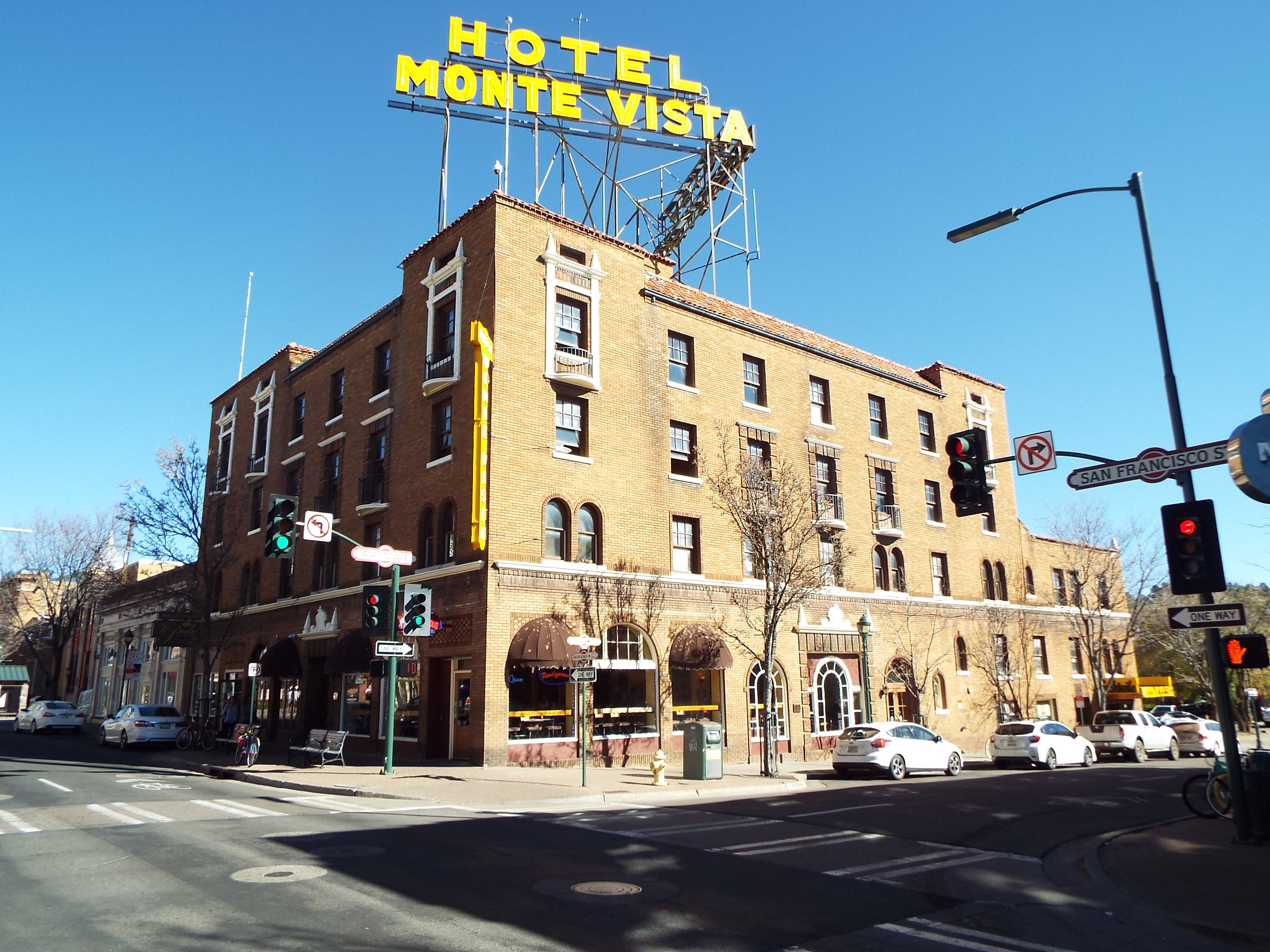
The Monte Vista Hotel.

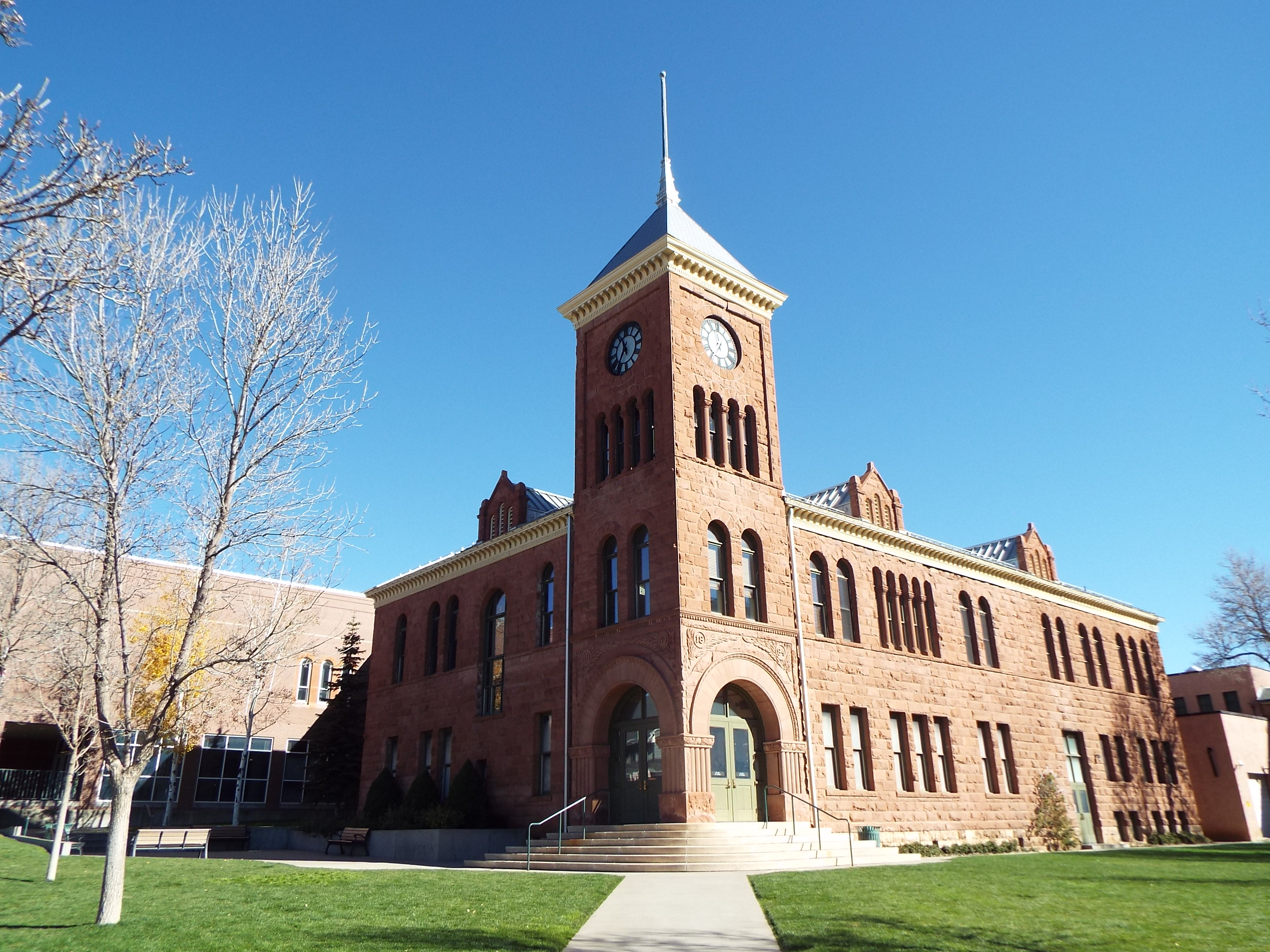
The Coconino County Superior Courthouse.

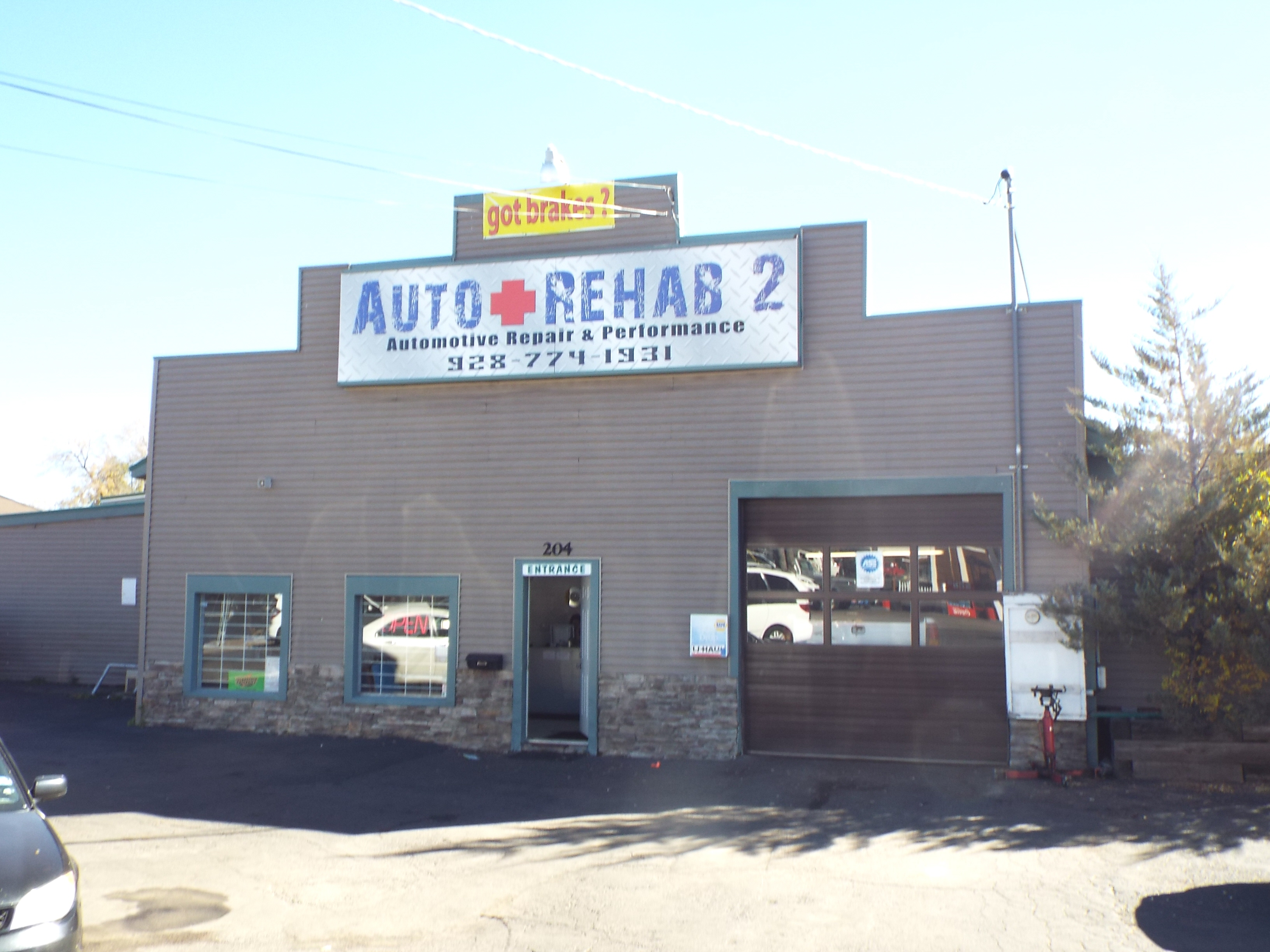
The C & M Garage.

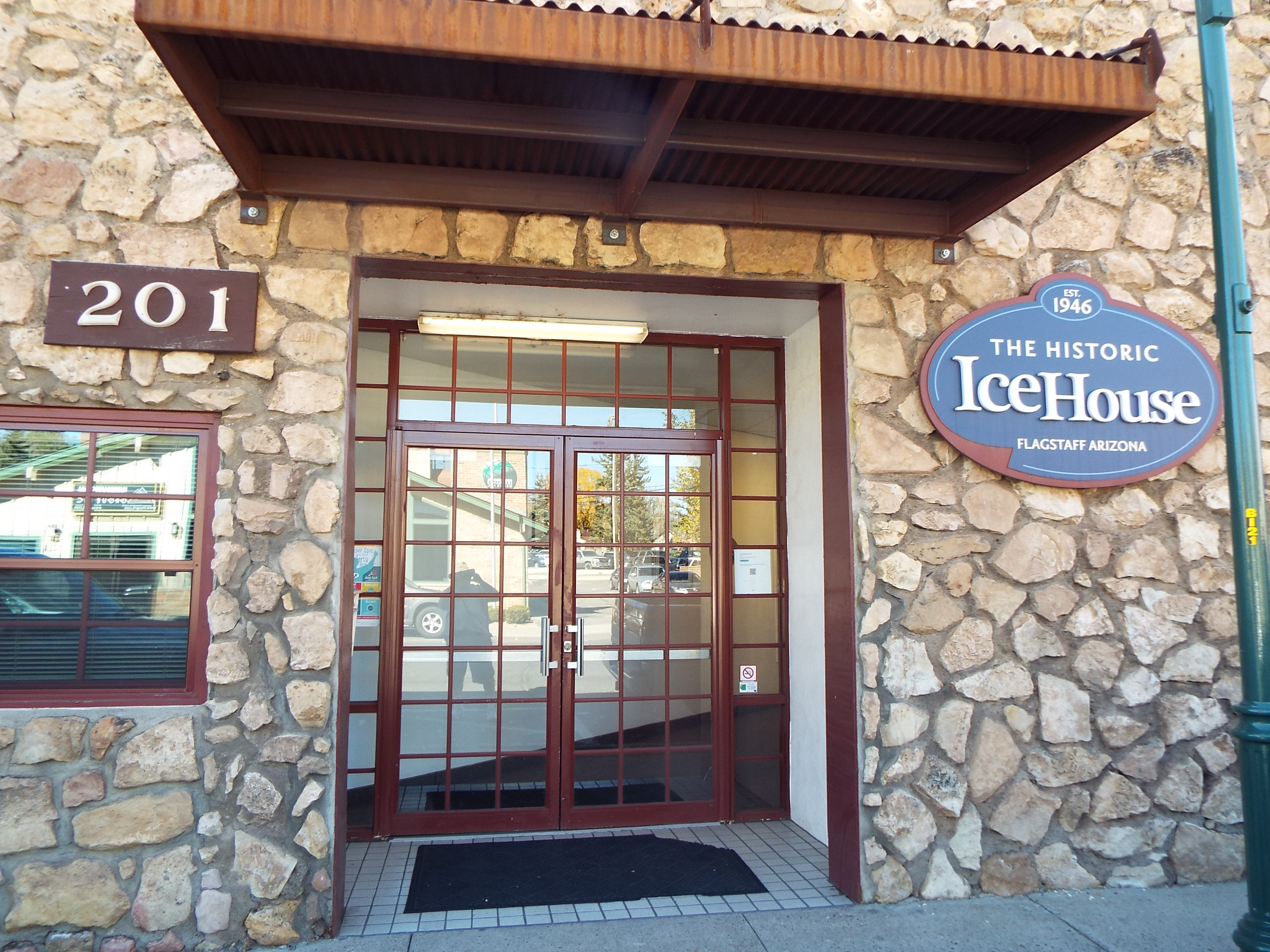
The Ice House.

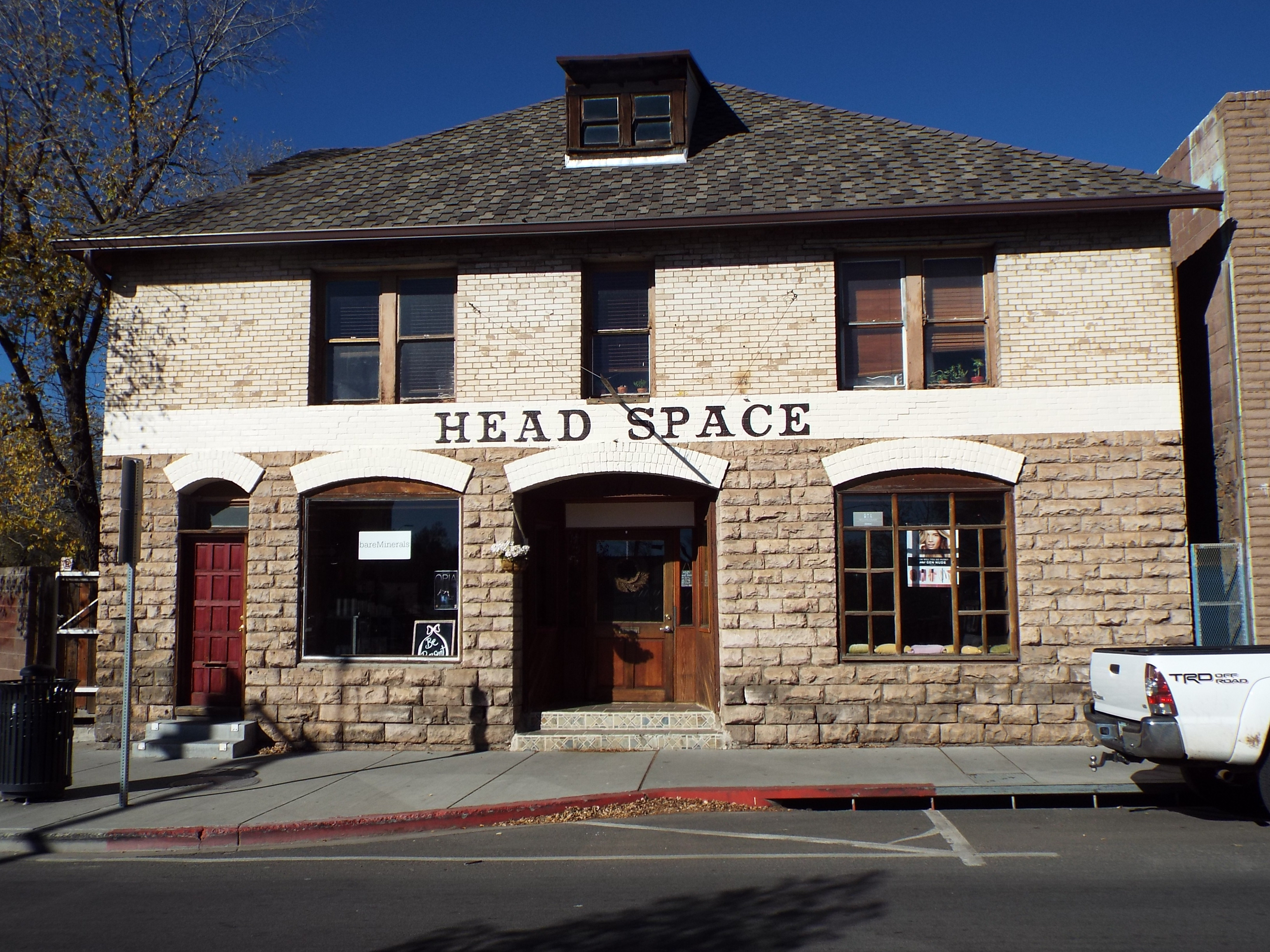
The La Cuidad de Mexico Grocery Building.

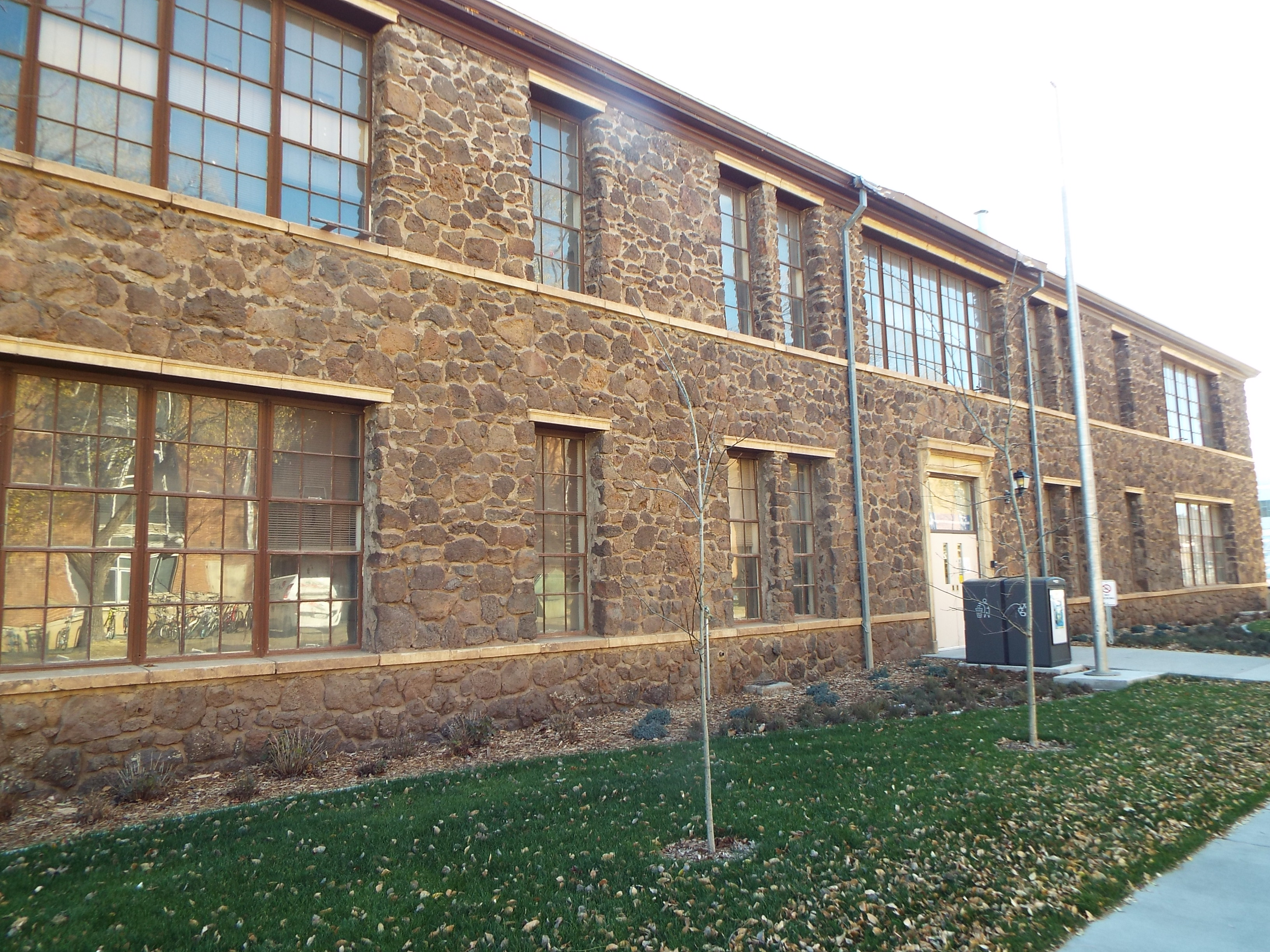
The South Beaver School.

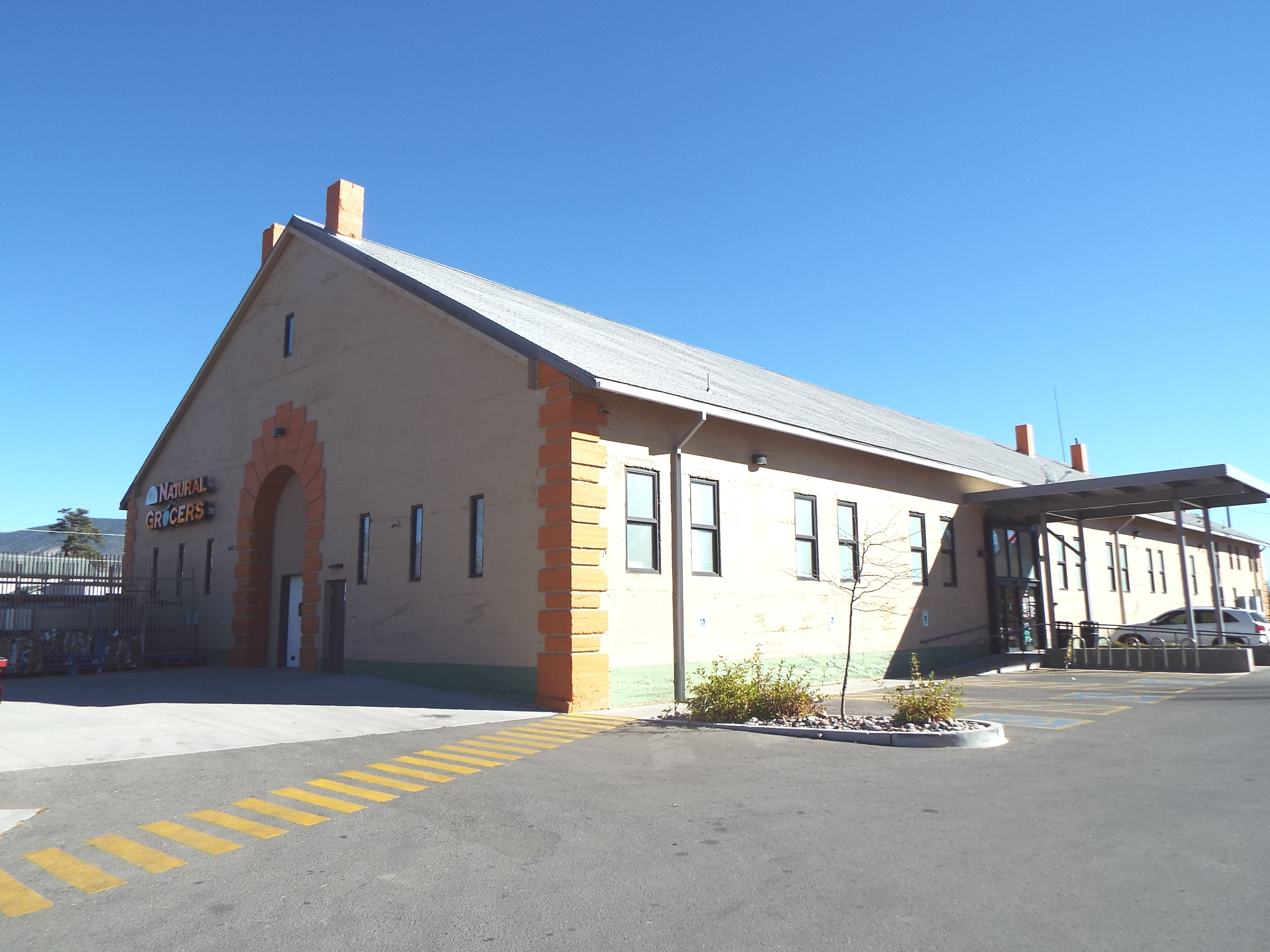
The Flagstaff Armory.

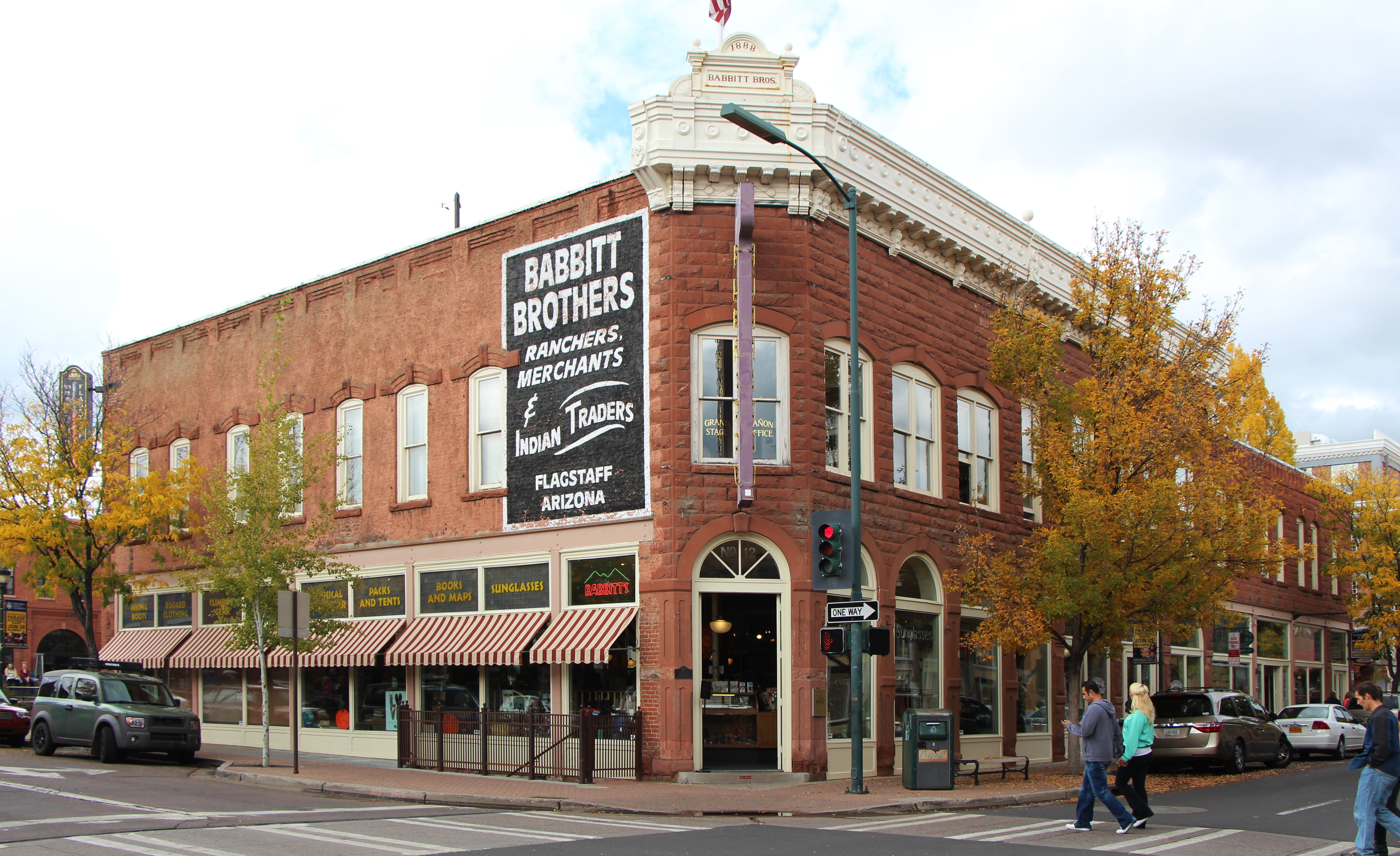
The Babbitt Brothers Building.

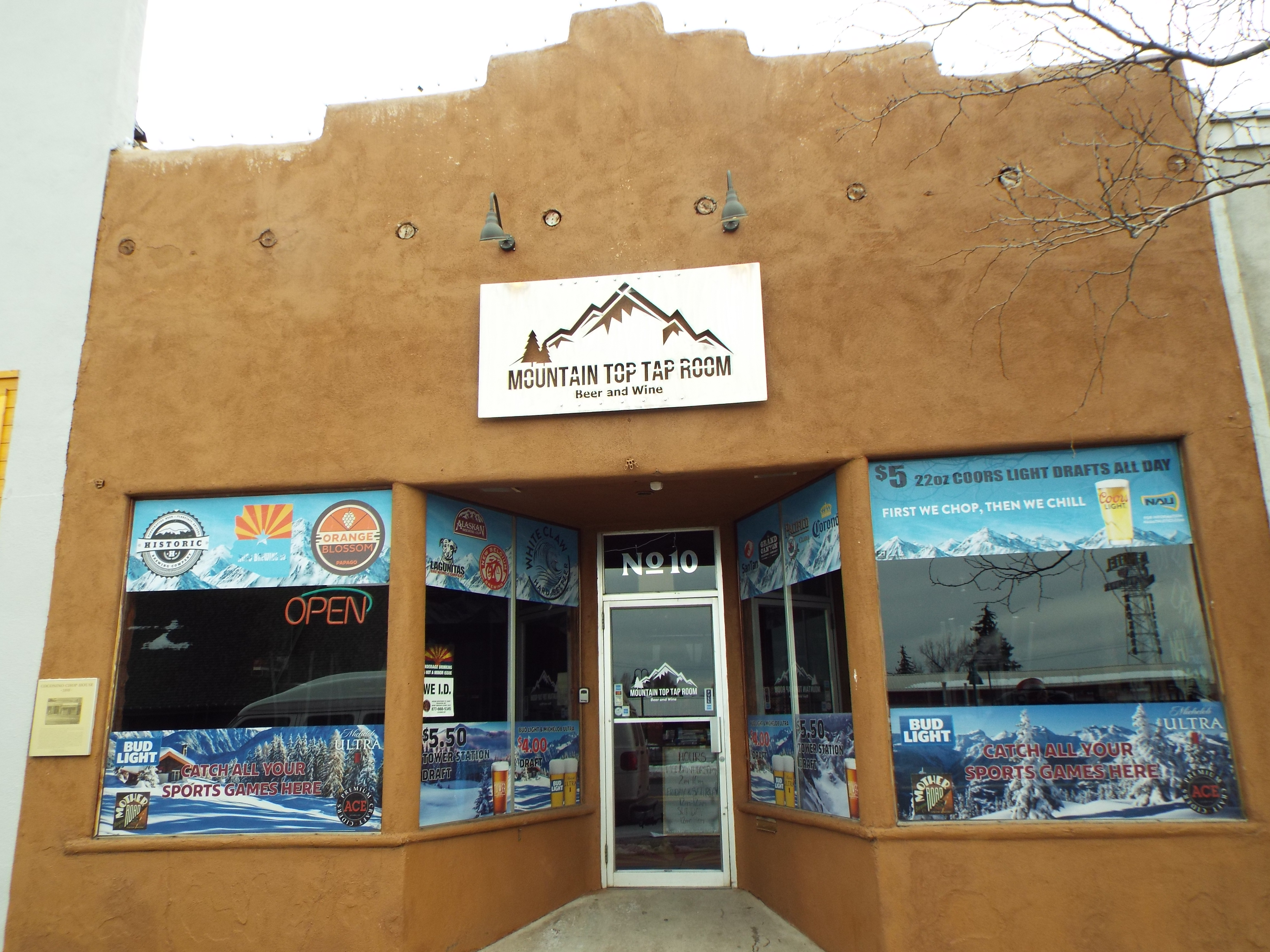
The Coconino Chop House.

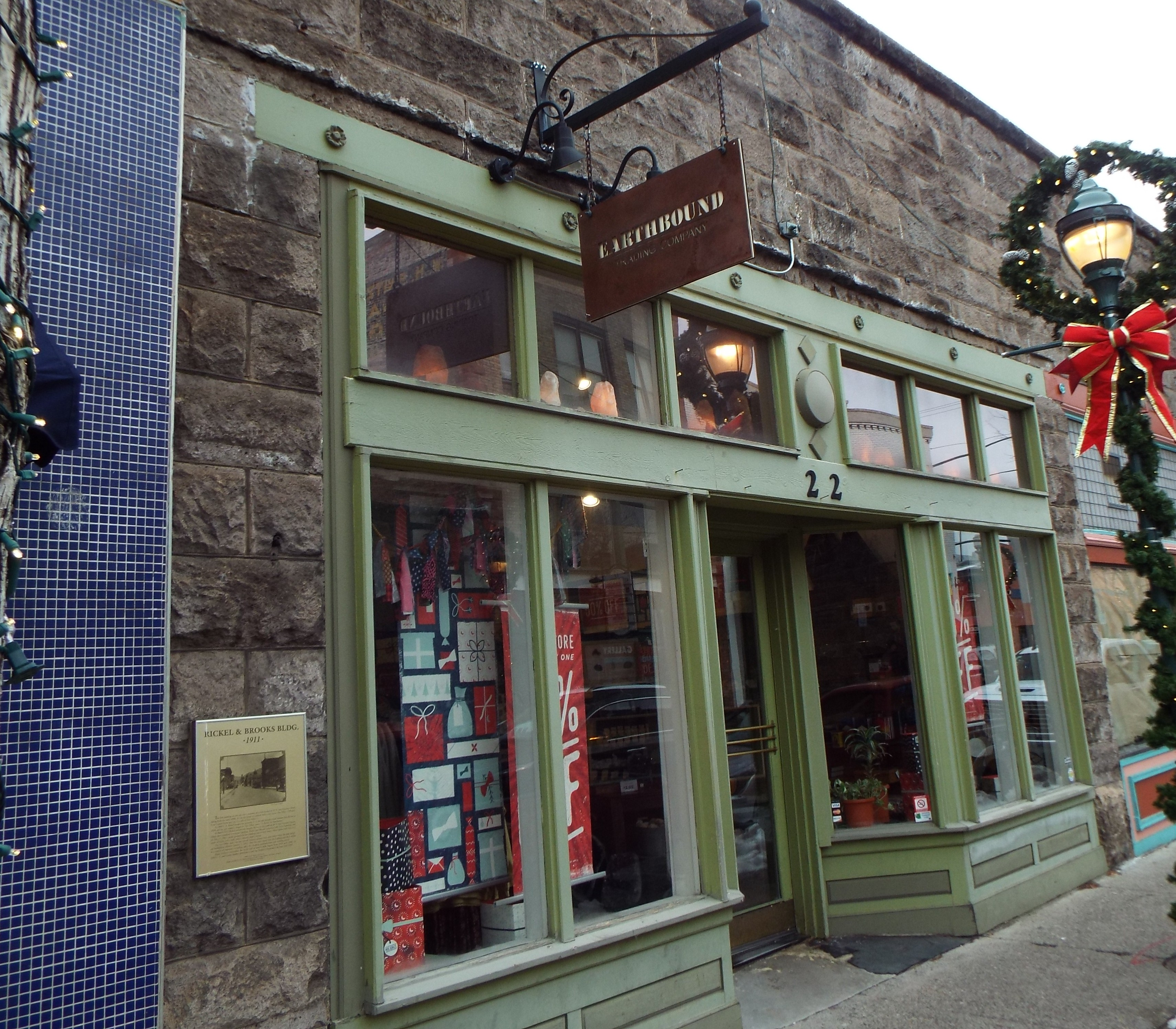
The Rickets and Brooks Building.

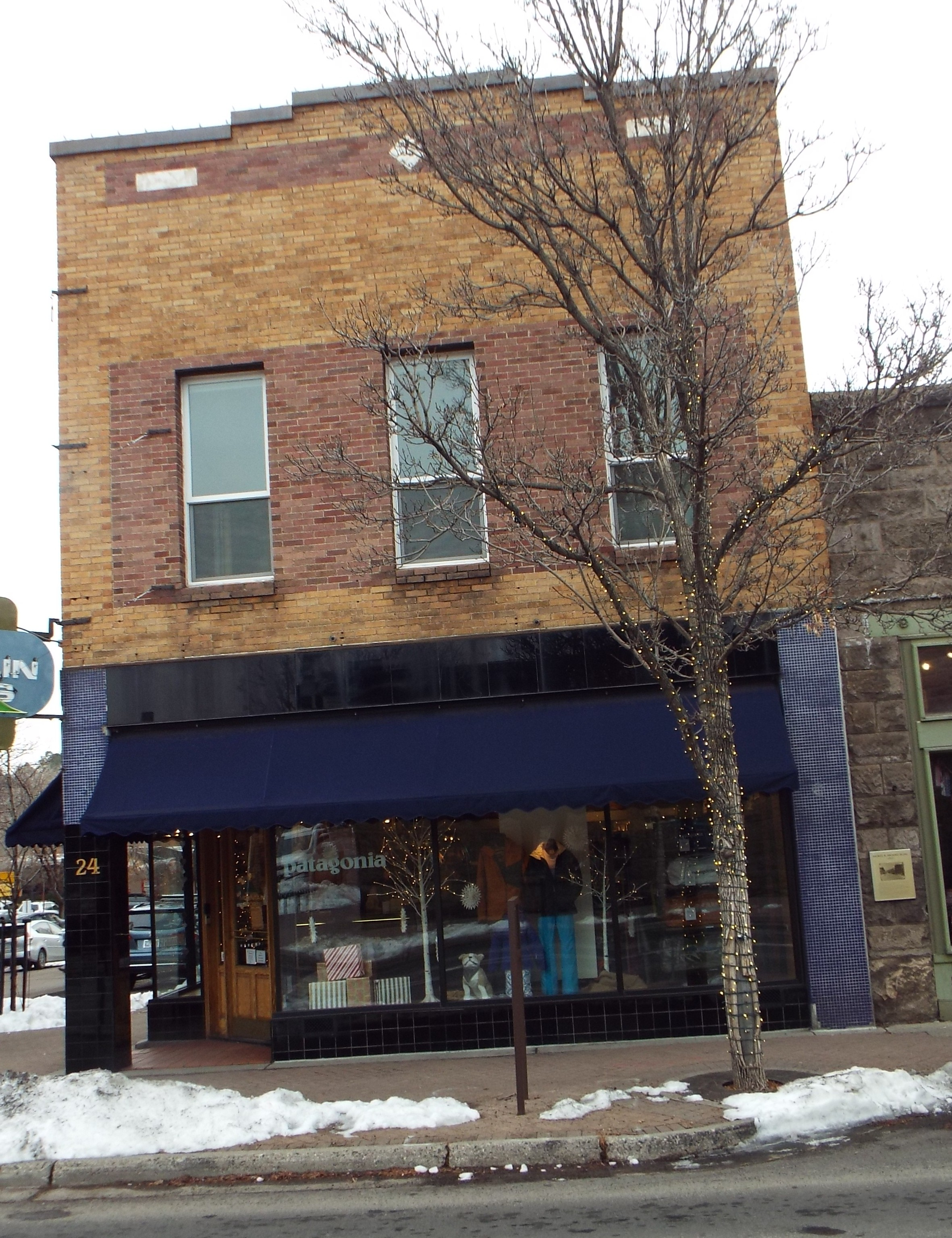
The Verchamp Building.

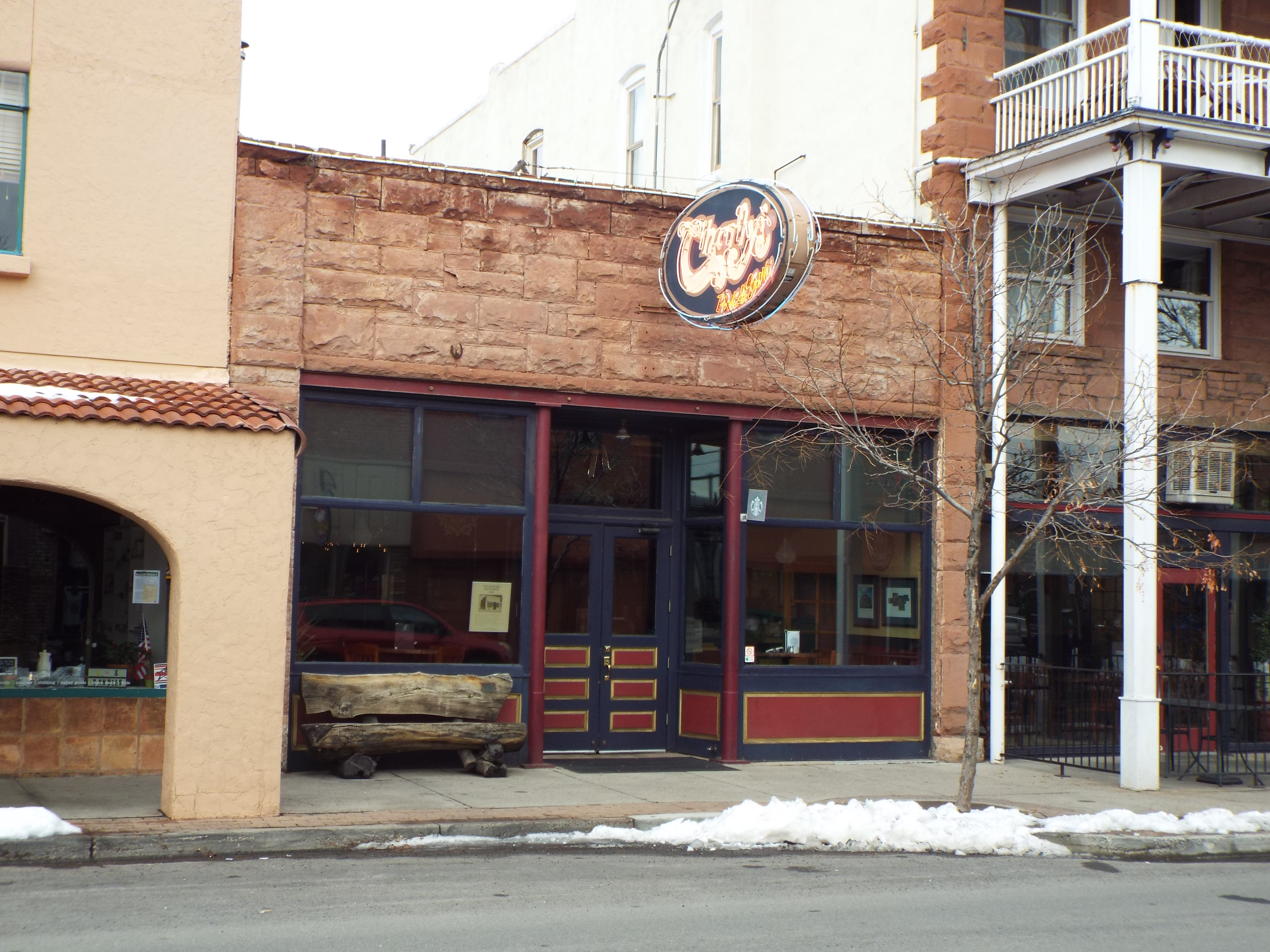
The Telephone/Exchange Building.

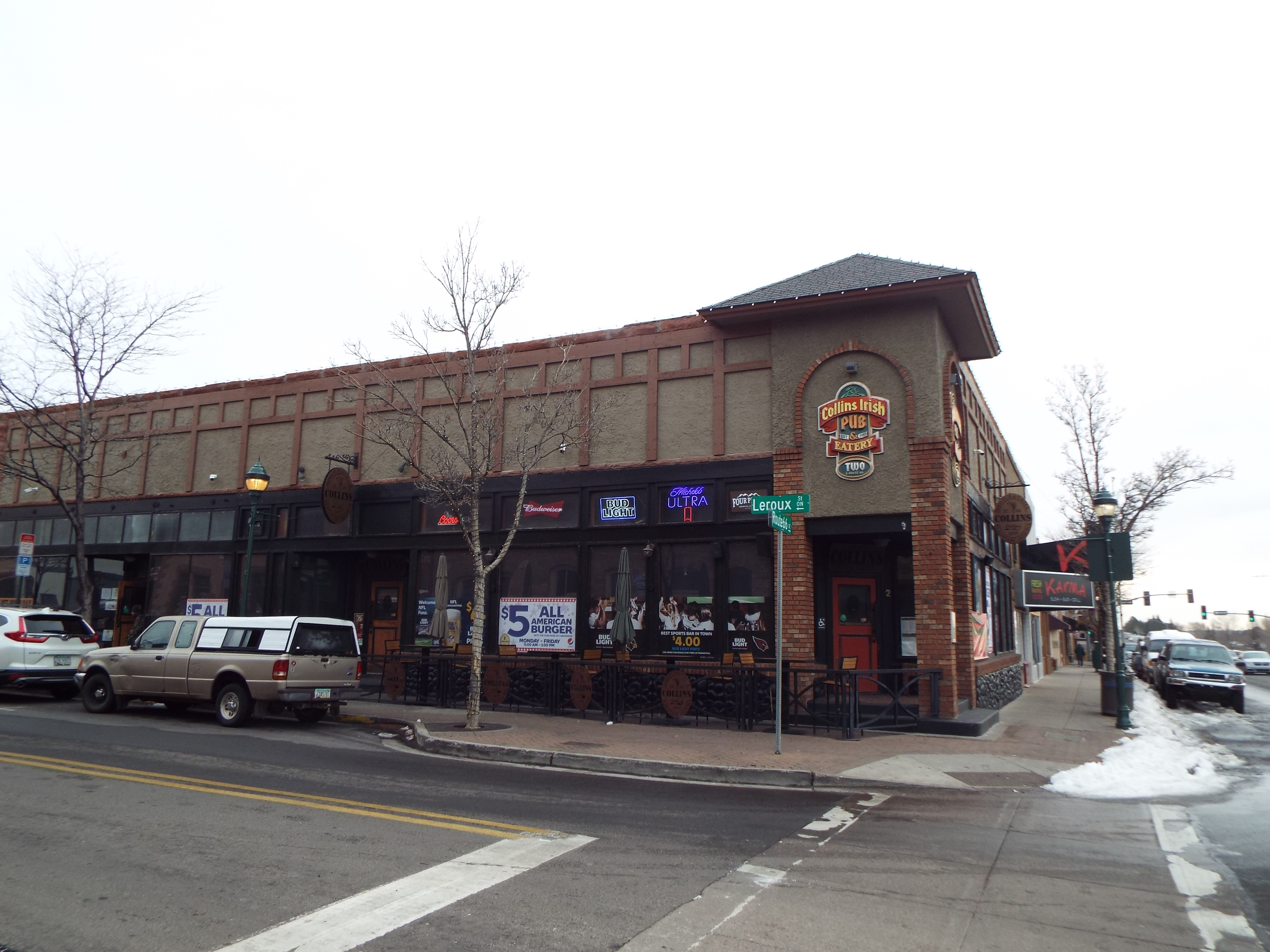
The Aubineau-Andreates Building.

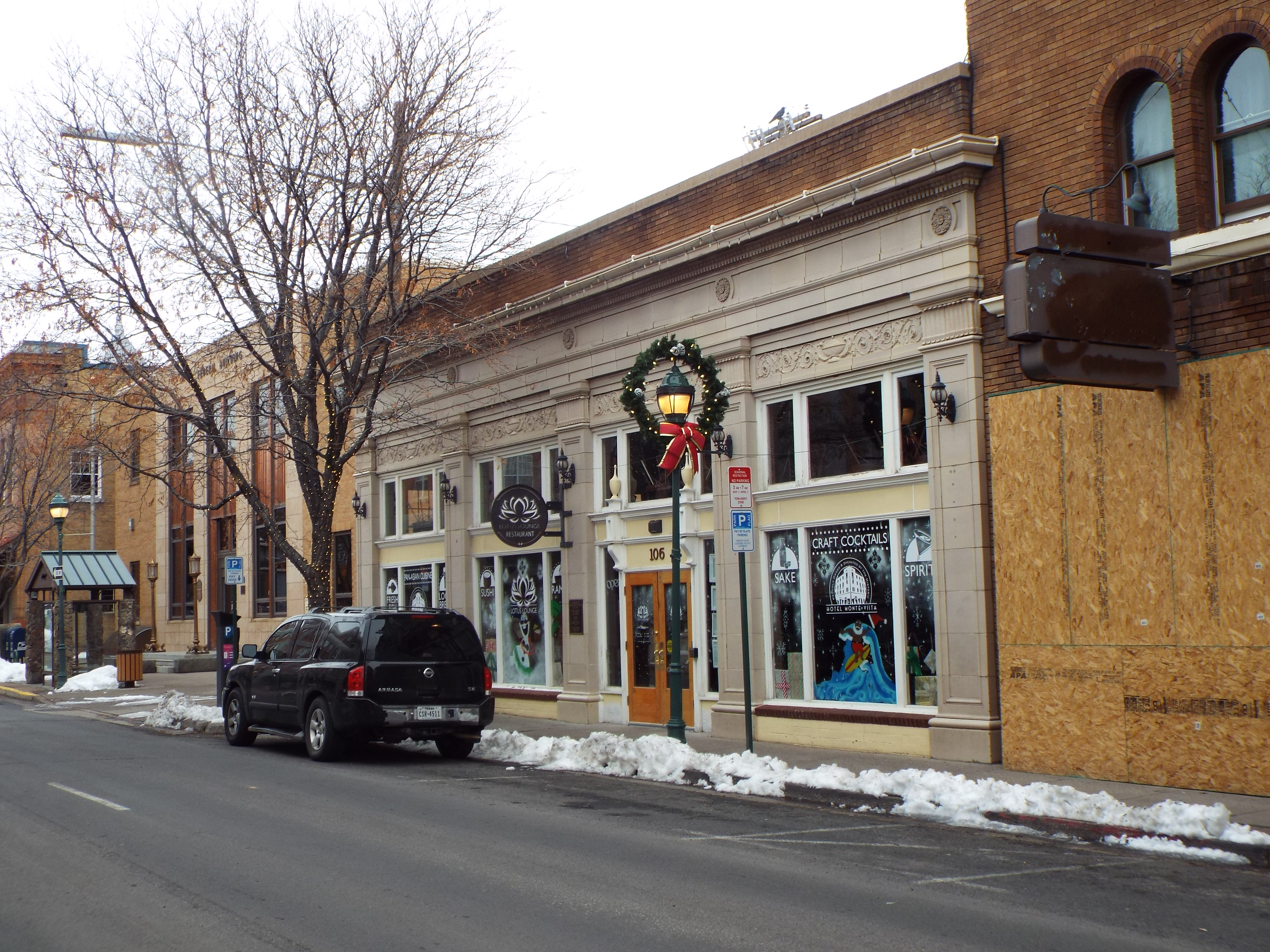
Old Flagstaff Post Office

=== Historic train and train station ===
The Flagstaff Station was built in 1890. The newer and larger station was built in 1926. It is located at 1 East Route 66. The station now houses the Flagstaff Visitor Center. The station is located within the boundaries Railroad Addition Historic District which was listed in the National Register of Historic Places on January 18, 1983, Ref. #83002989.

The Two Spot Logging Train was built in 1911 and is now on exhibition by the Junction of San Francisco Street and BNSF Railroad. The train was purchased by the Arizona Lumber and Timber Company in 1917. It was retired from service in 1966. It was listed in the National Register of Historic Places September 14, 1999, Ref. #99001066.

Historic train and train station
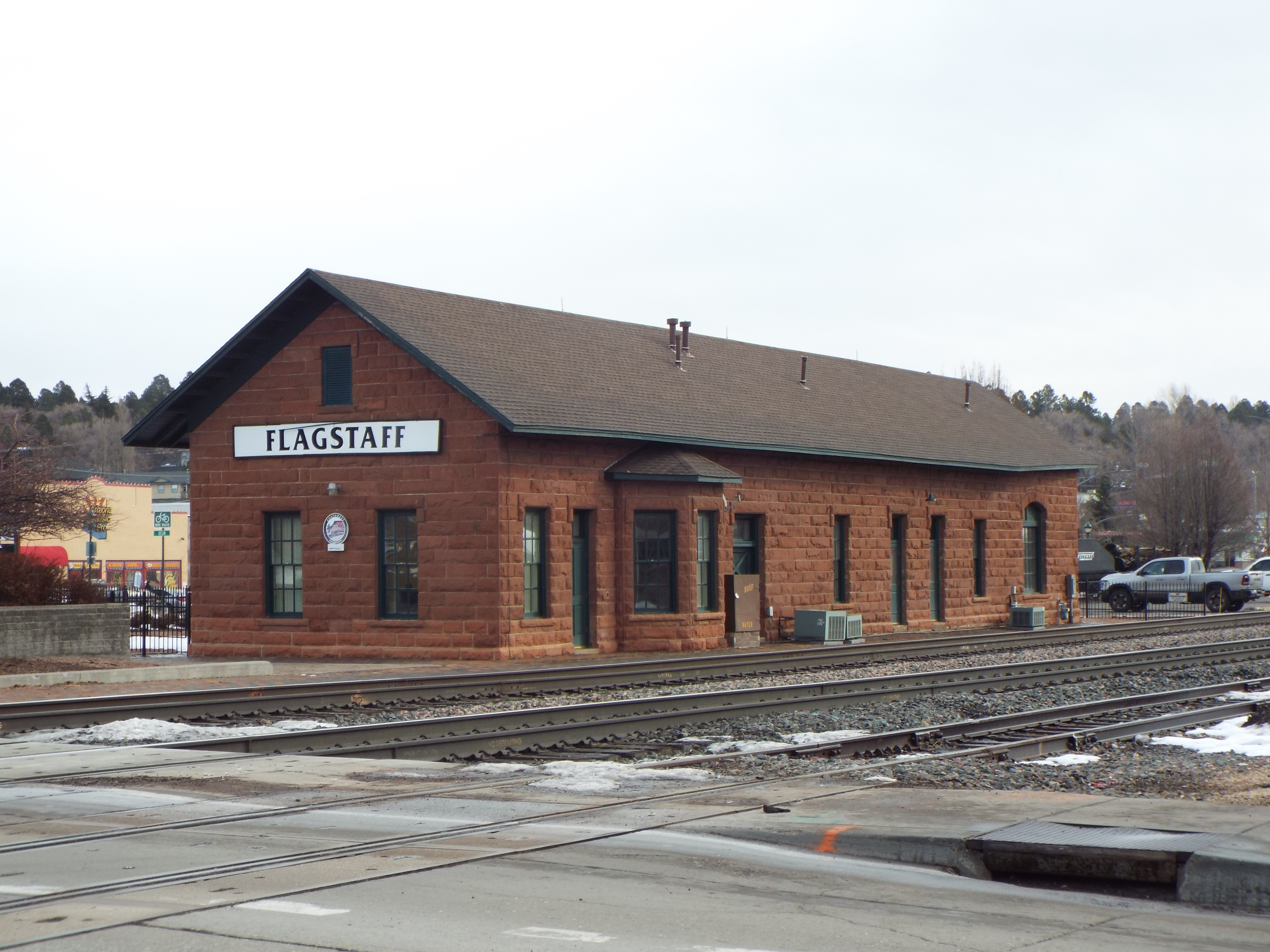
The 1890 Flagstaff Station

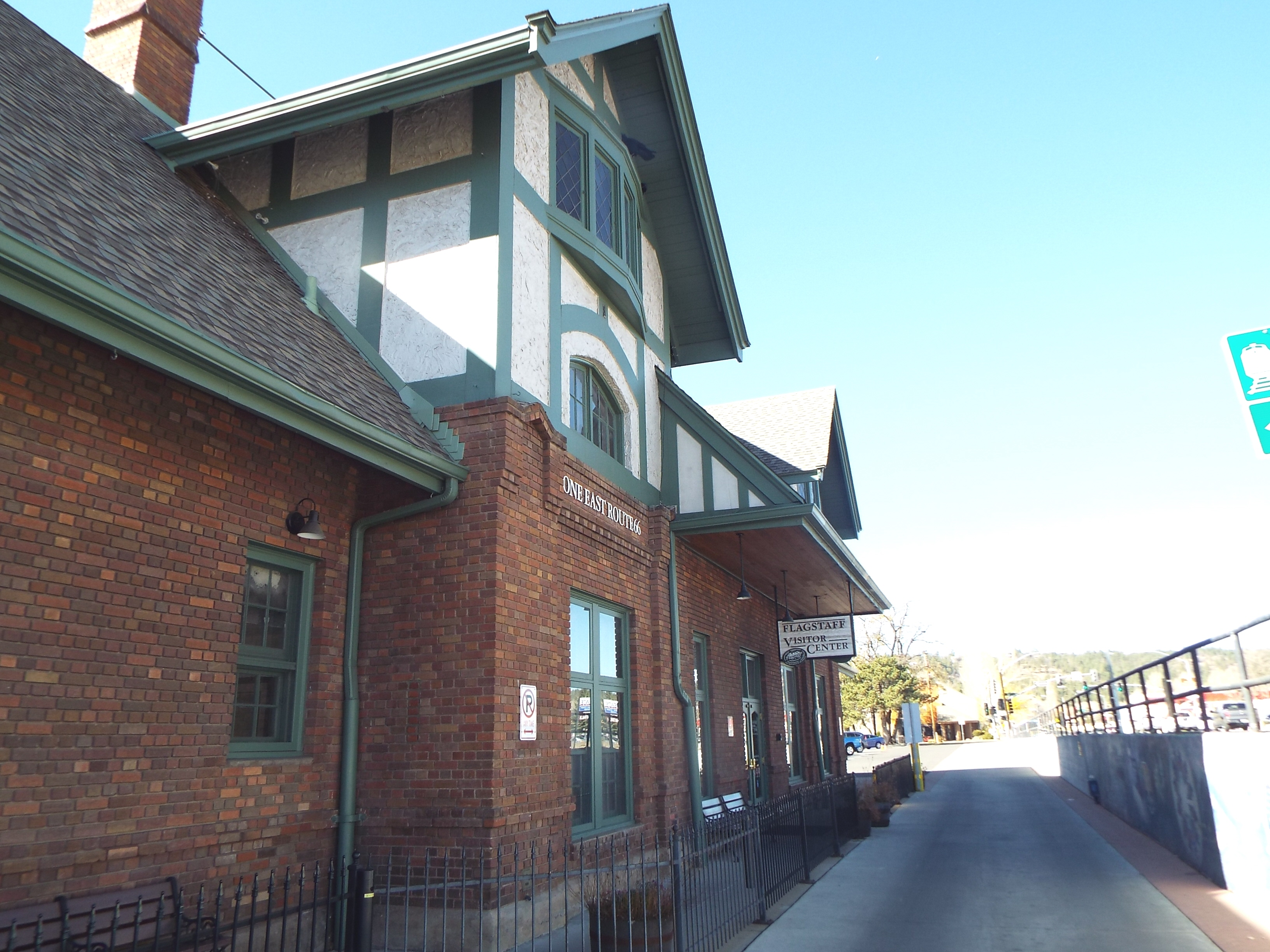
The Flagstaff Station – 1926

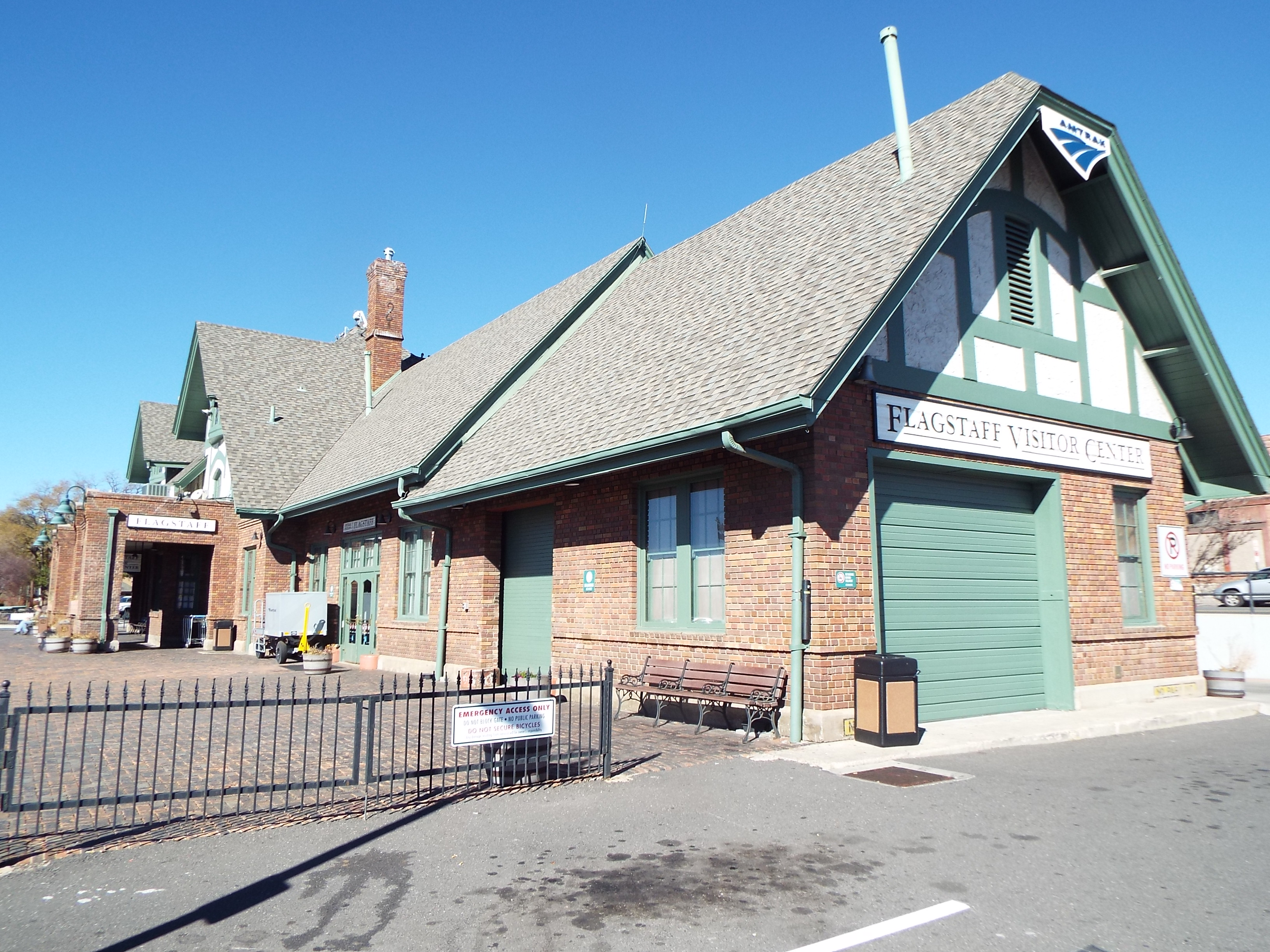
Different view of the Flagstaff Station.

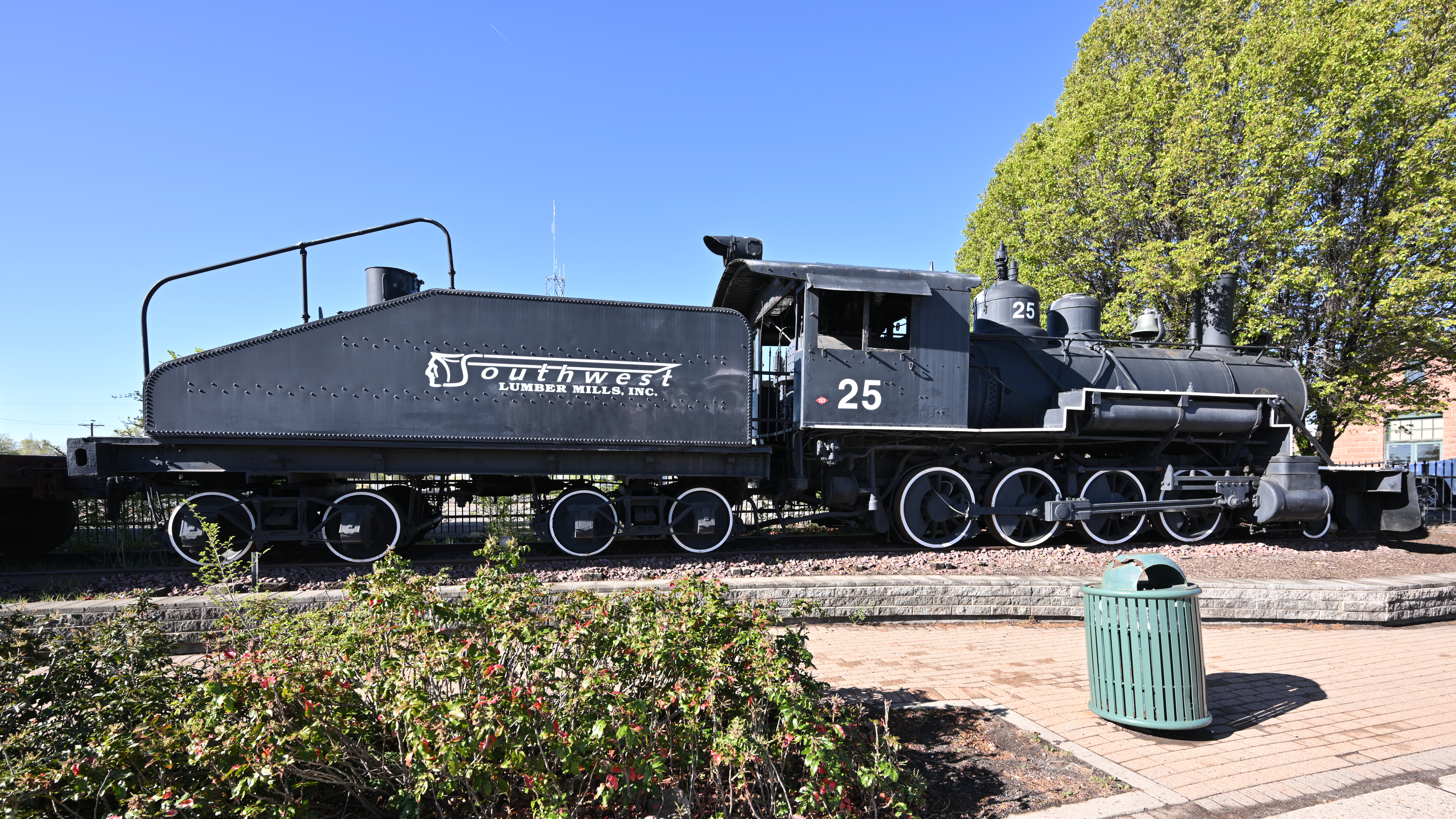
The Two Spot Logging Train.

=== Historic houses of worship ===
- The First Baptist Church – built in 1939 and located at 123 S. Beaver Street.
- The La Iglesia Metodista Mexicana El Divino Redentor – built in 1892 and located at 319 S. San Francisco Street.
- The Our Lady of Guadalupe Church – built in 1926 and located at 302 S. Kendrick Street.
- The Methodist Episcopal Church – built in 1906 and is located at 400 W. Aspen Ave.
Historic houses of worship
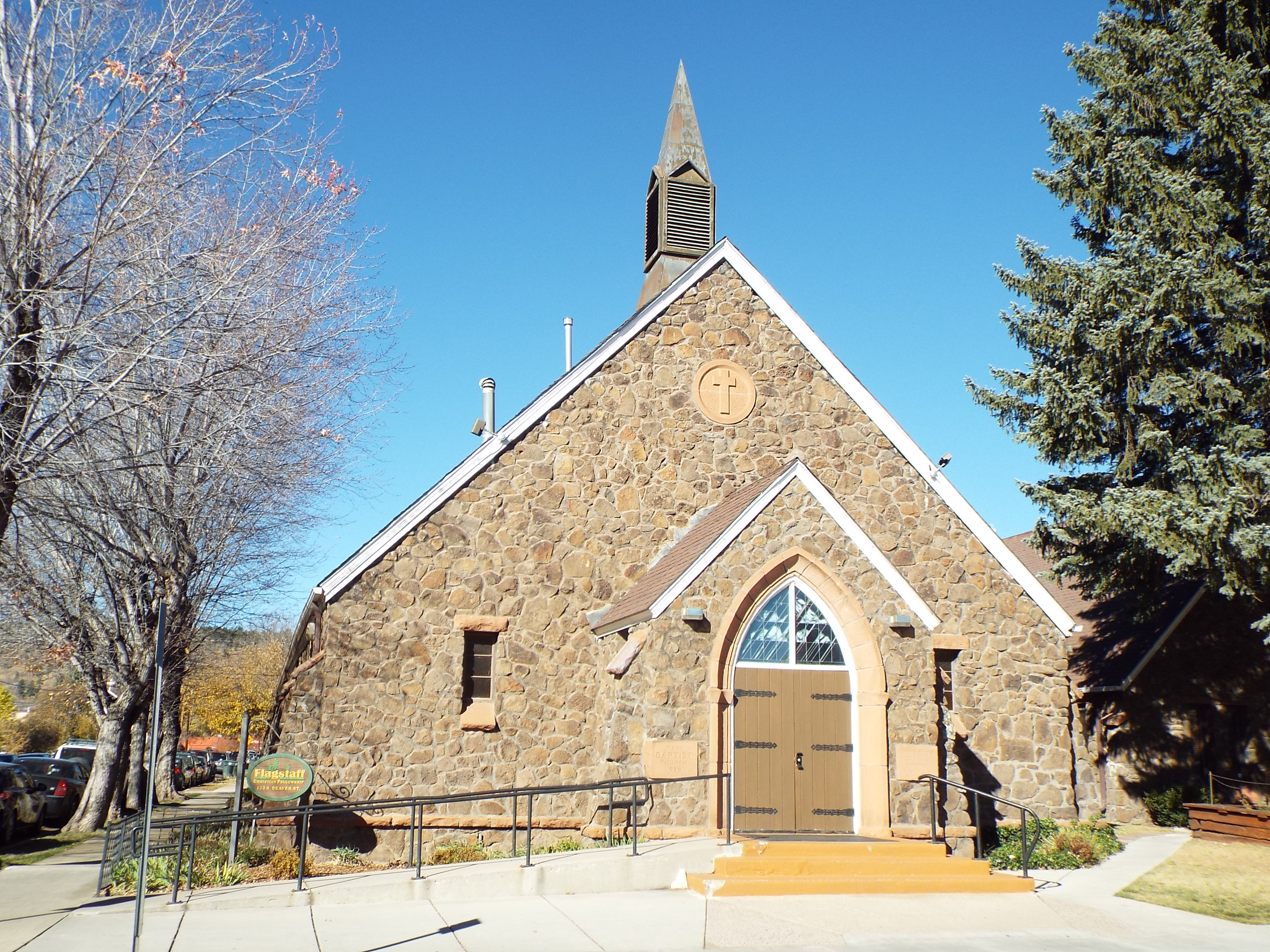
The First Baptist Church.

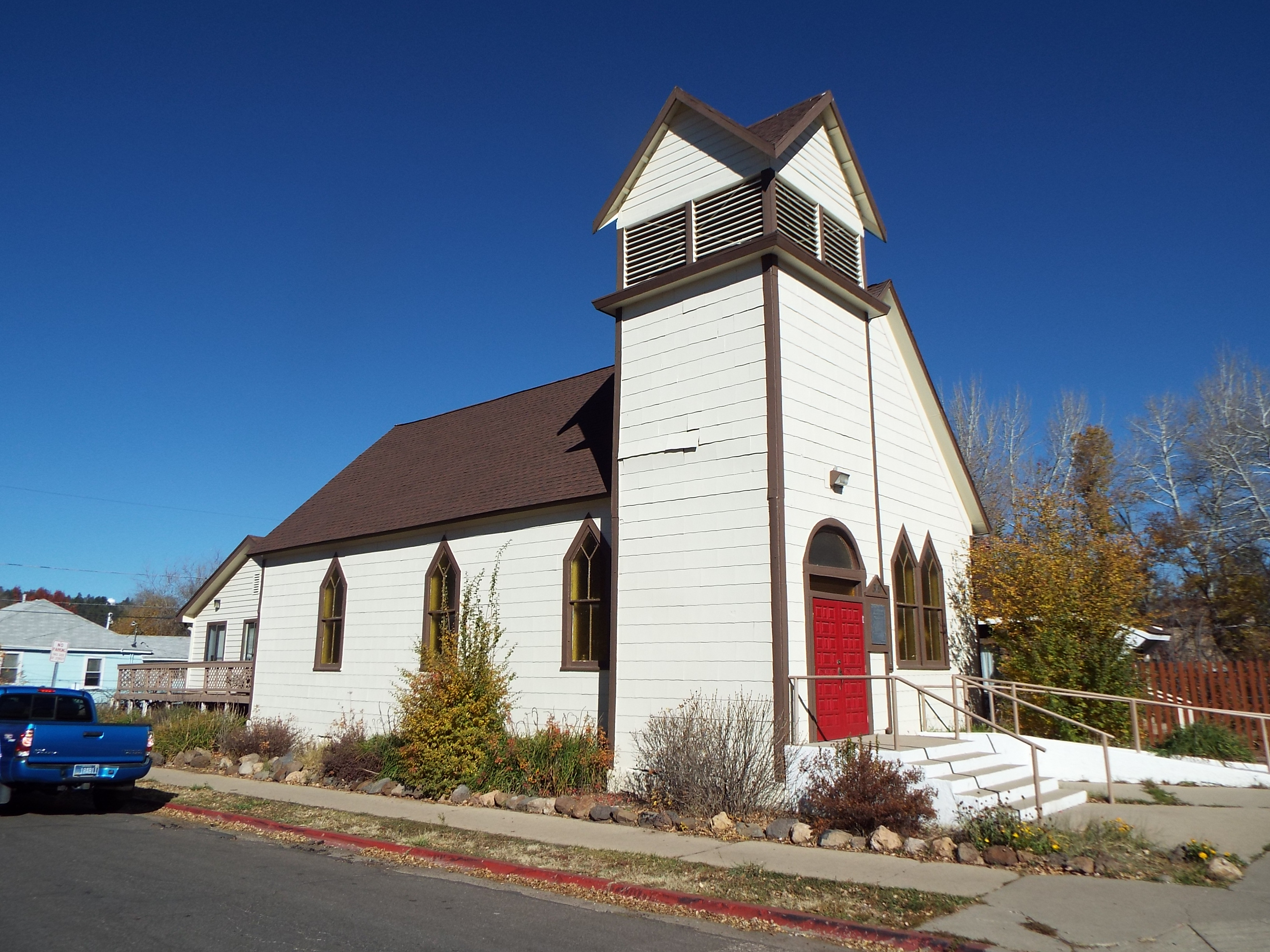
The La Iglesia Metodista Mexicana El Divino Redentor.

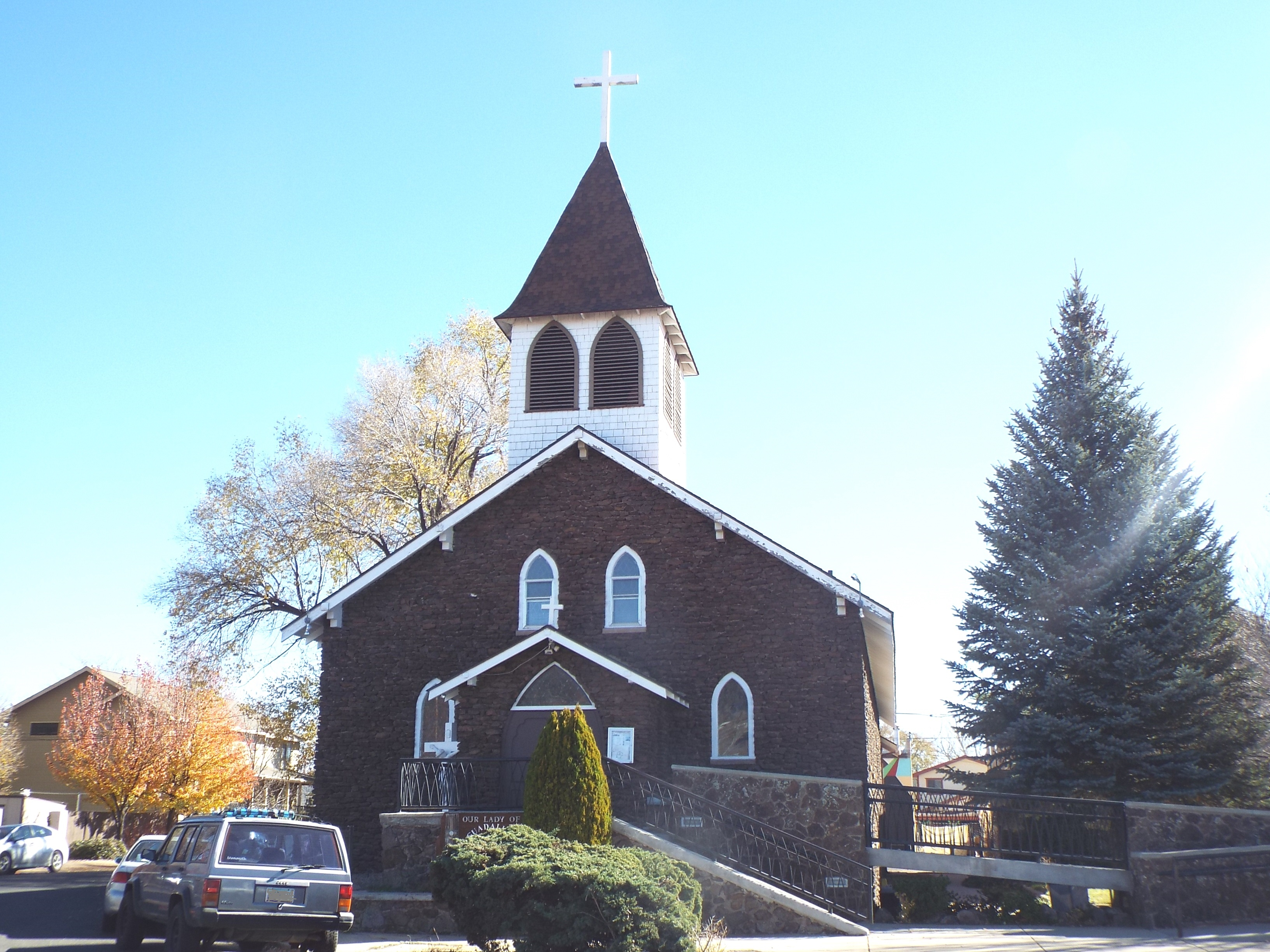
The Our Lady of Guadalupe Church.

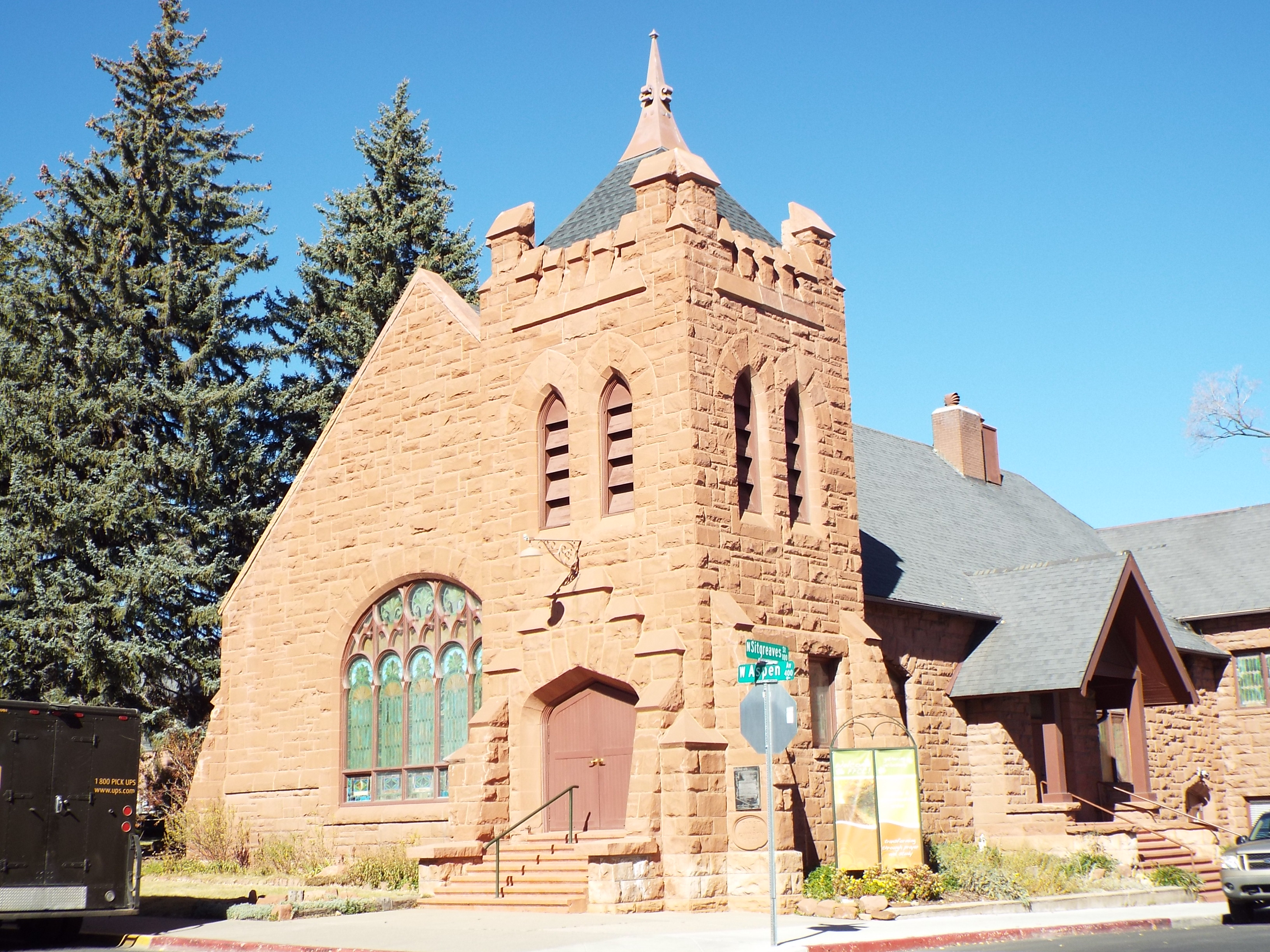
The Methodist Episcopal Church.

=== Historic Houses ===
- The Brannen-Devine House – located on 209 E. Cottage Road.
- The J.M. Clark House – located on 503 N. Humphreys Street.
- The Charles Wilson, Jr. House – located on 100 Wilson Drive.
- The Ashurst House – built in 1892 and located at 421 W. Aspen Ave. The house belonged to Henry F. Ashurst, one of the first two senators from Arizona.
- The H.E. Campbell House – built in 1890 and located at 215 N. Leroux Street.
- The House at 310 S. Beaver Street – built in 1911 and located at the same address.
- The Milligan House – built in 1900 and located at 323 W. Aspen.
- The Riorden Mansion – built in 1904 and located at 2 Knuhi Knoll
Historic houses
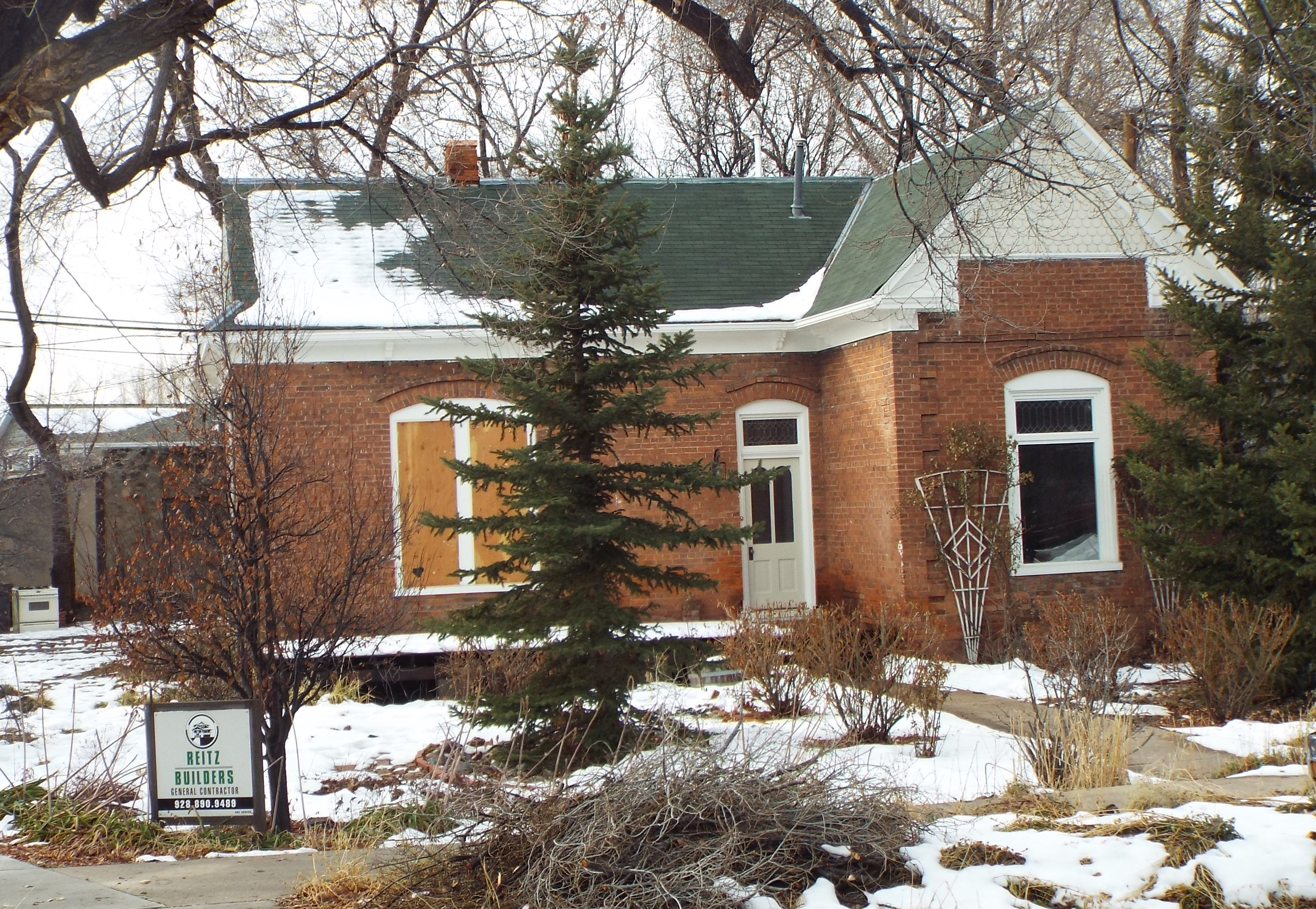
The Brannen-Devine House

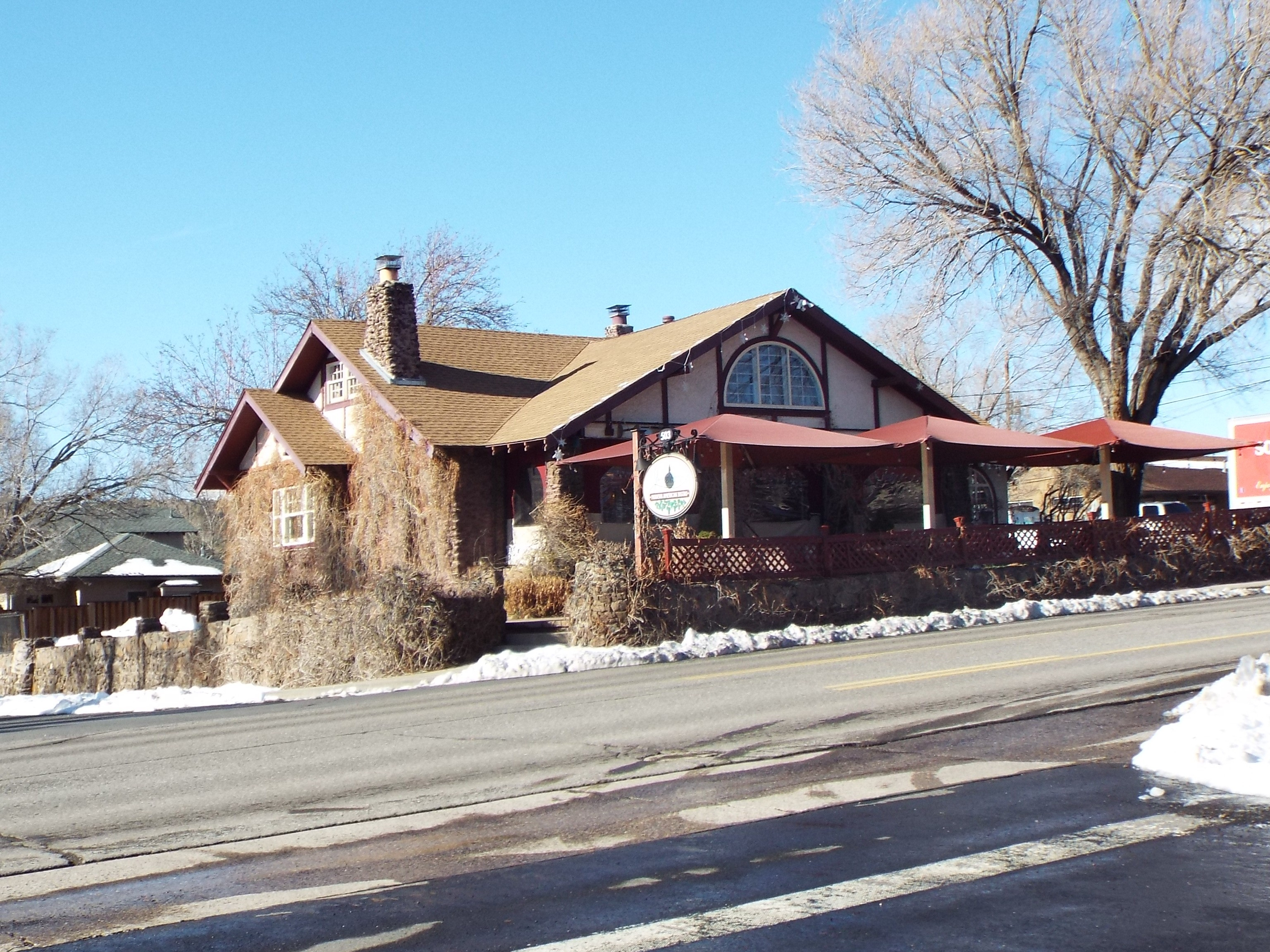
The J.M. Clark House.

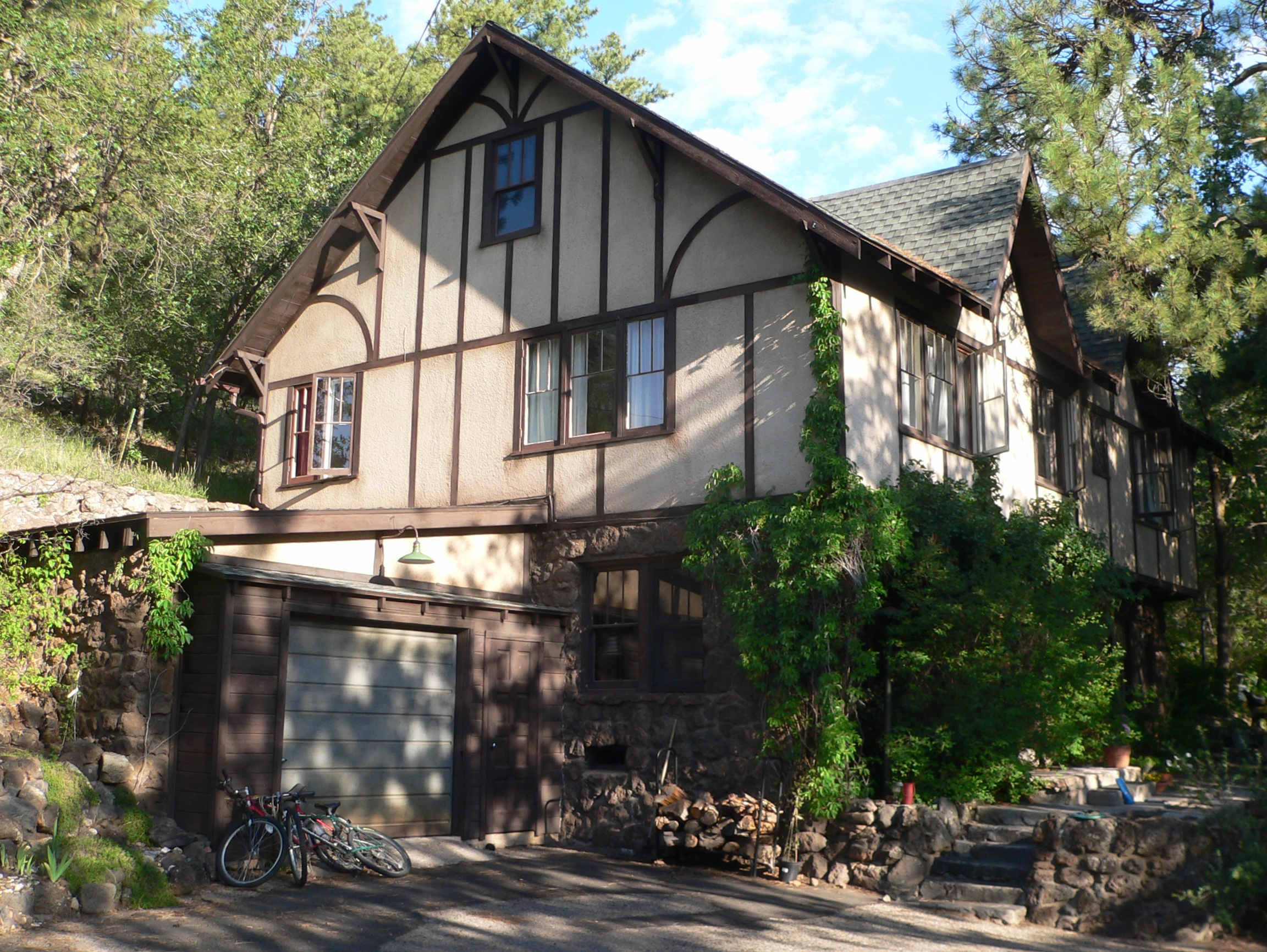
The Charles Wilson, Jr. House.

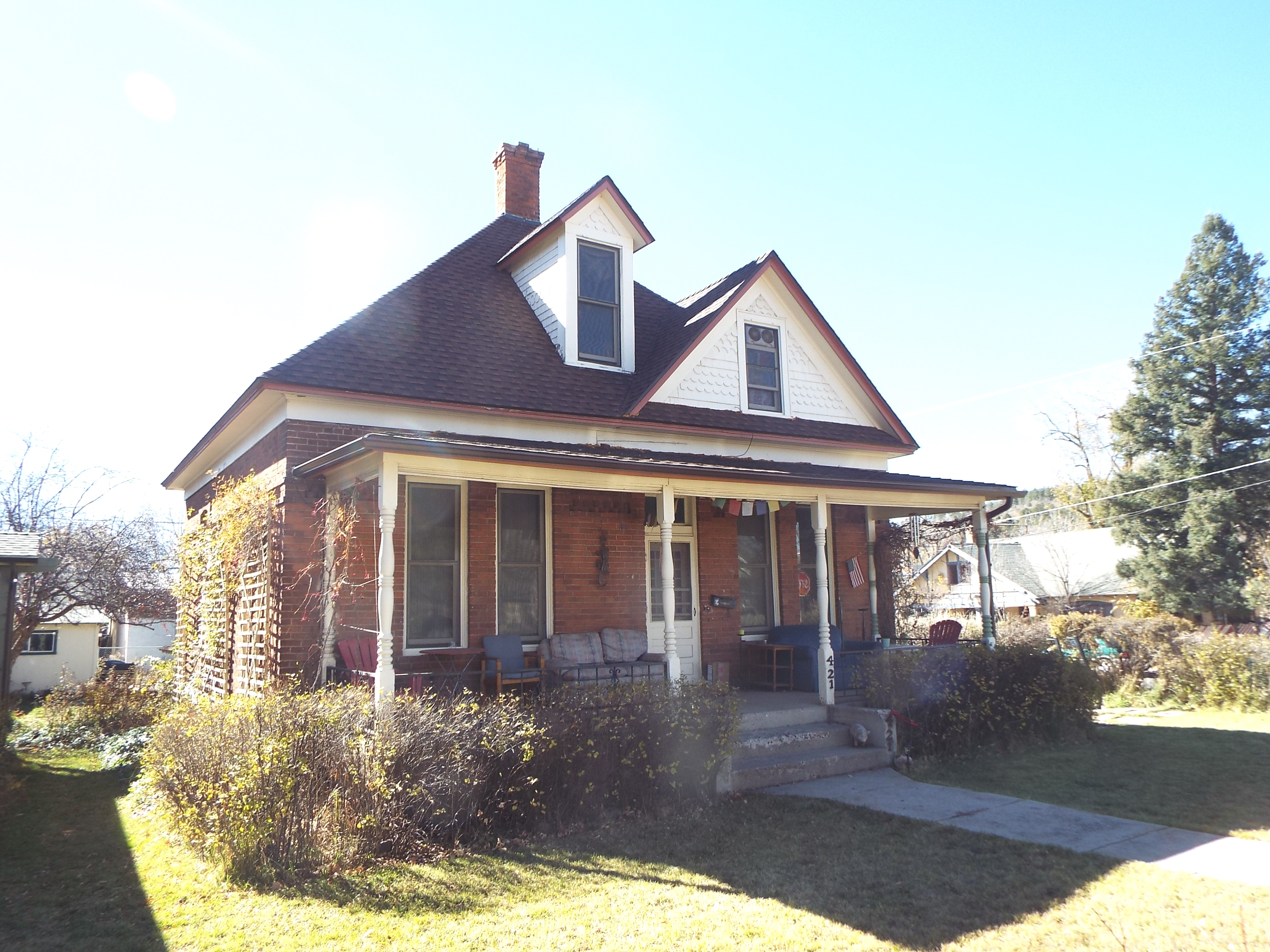
The Ashurst House.

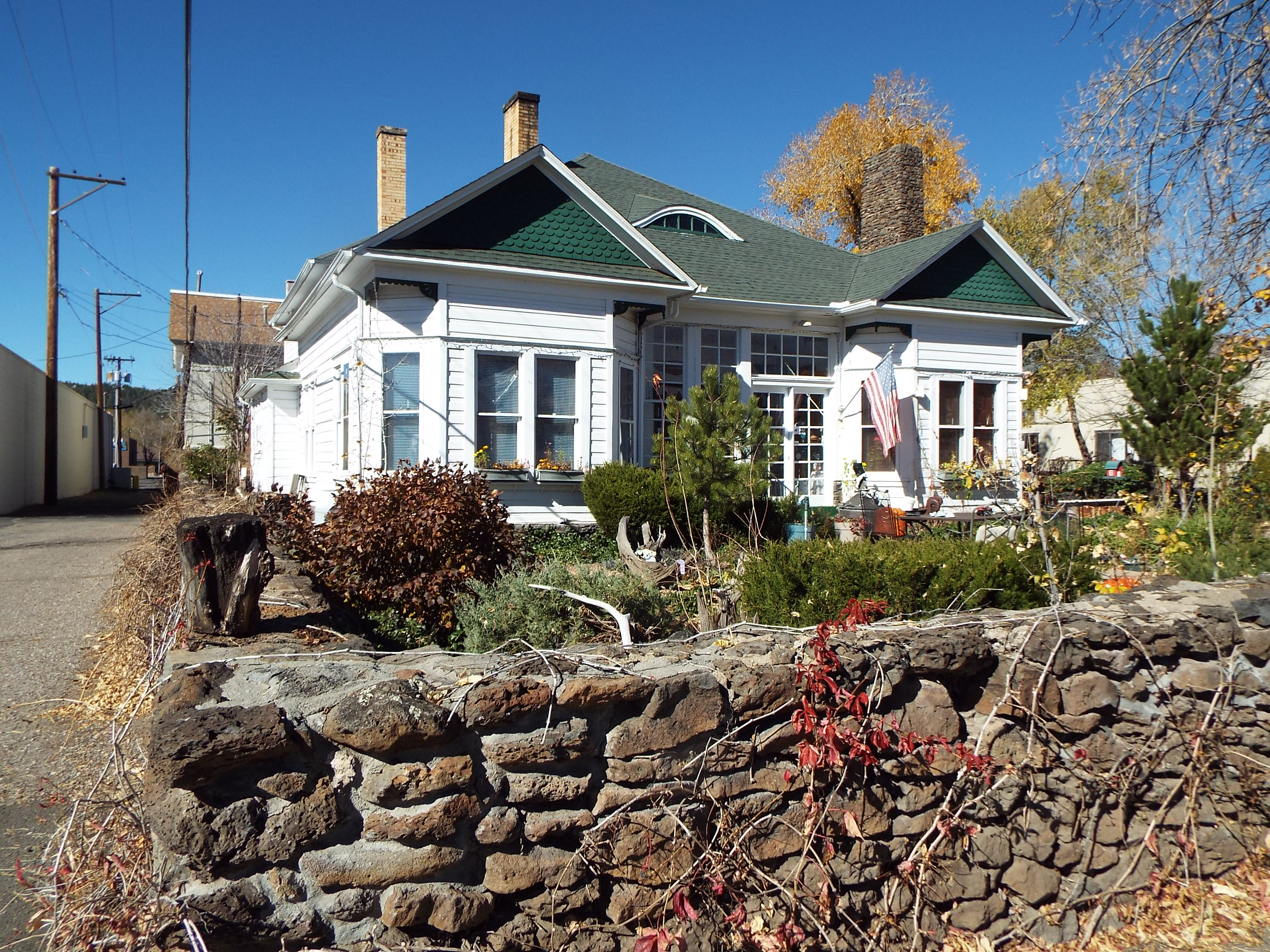
The H.E. Campbell House.

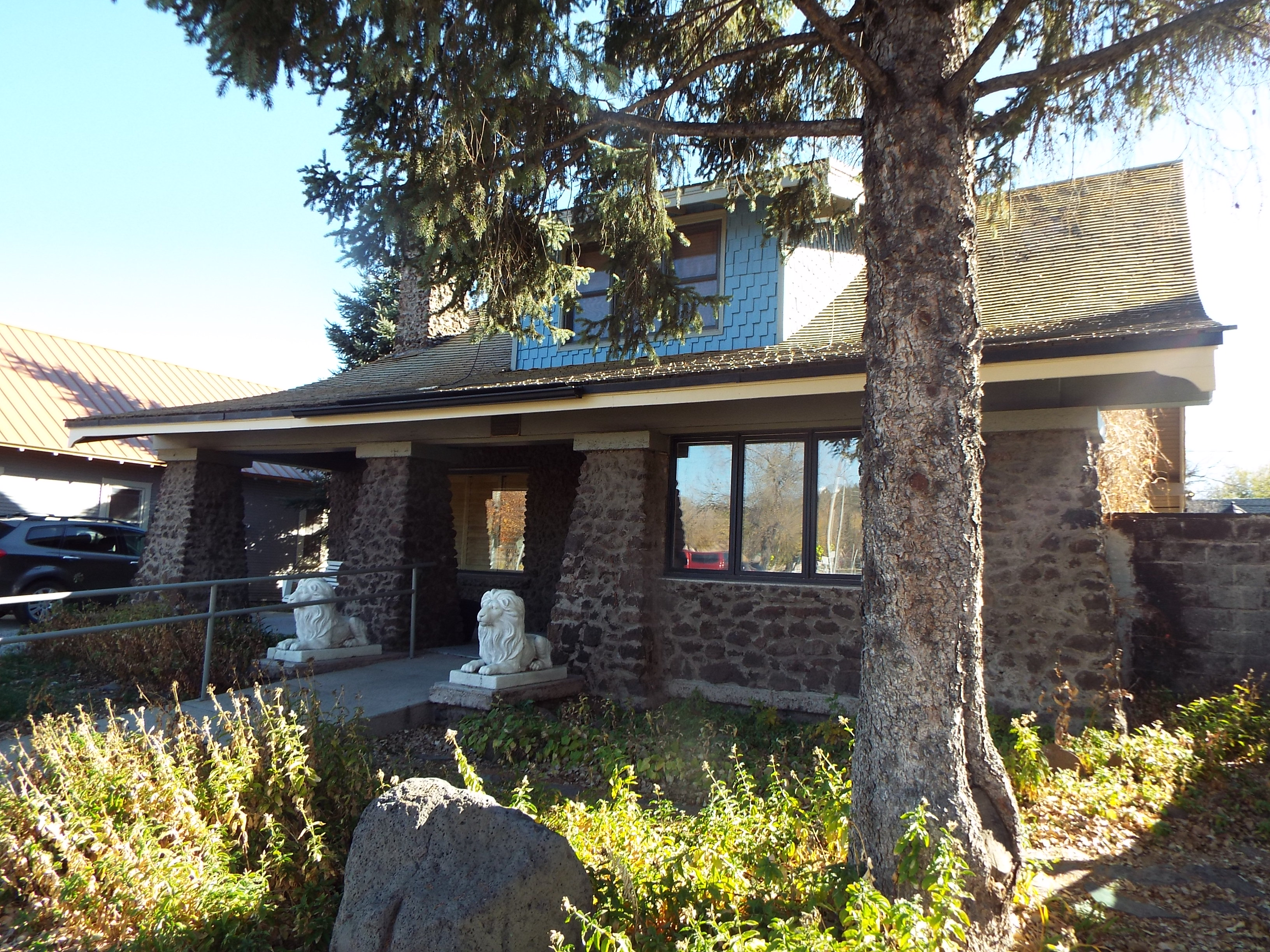
The House at 310 S. Beaver Street.

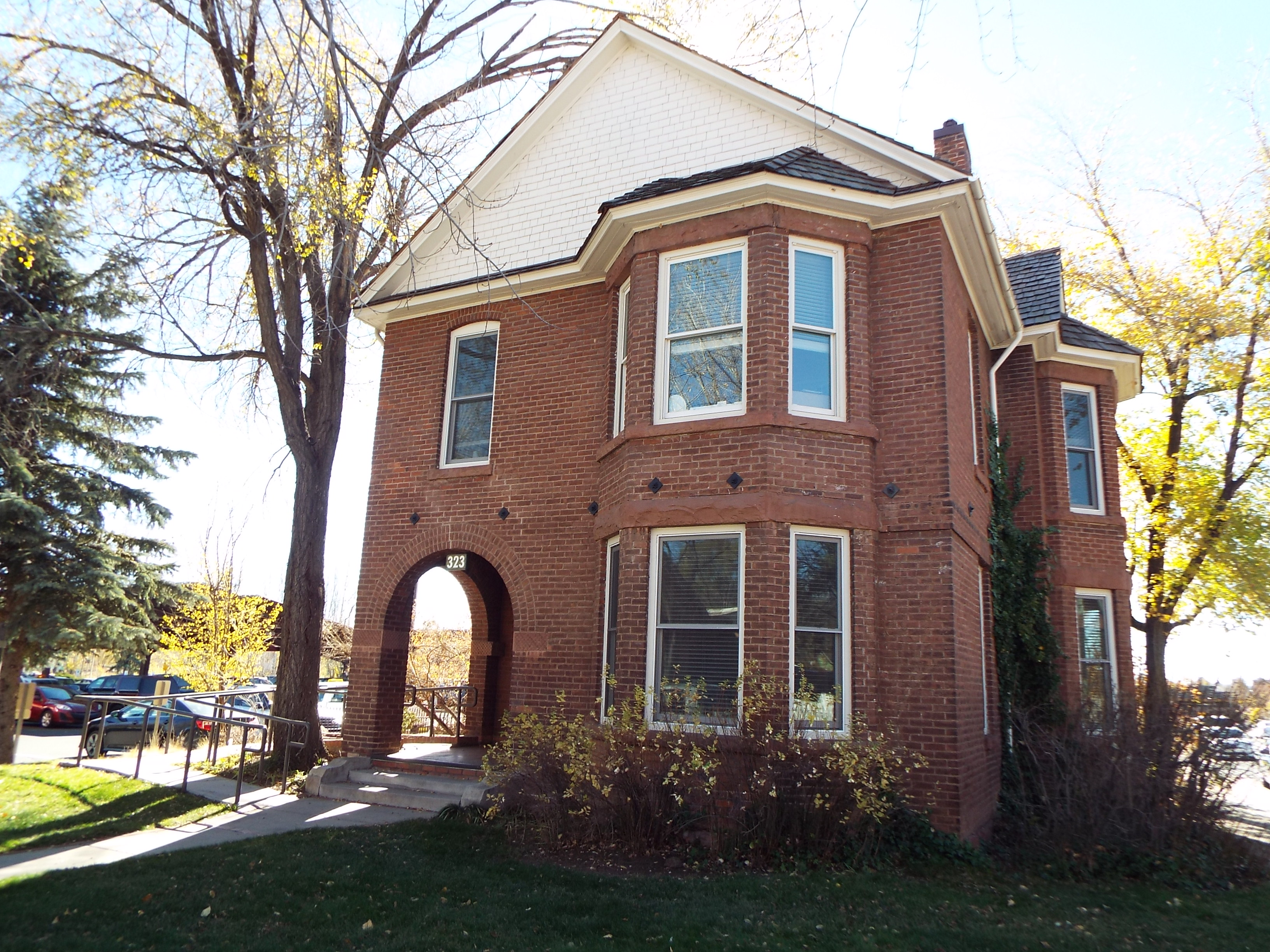
The Milligan House.

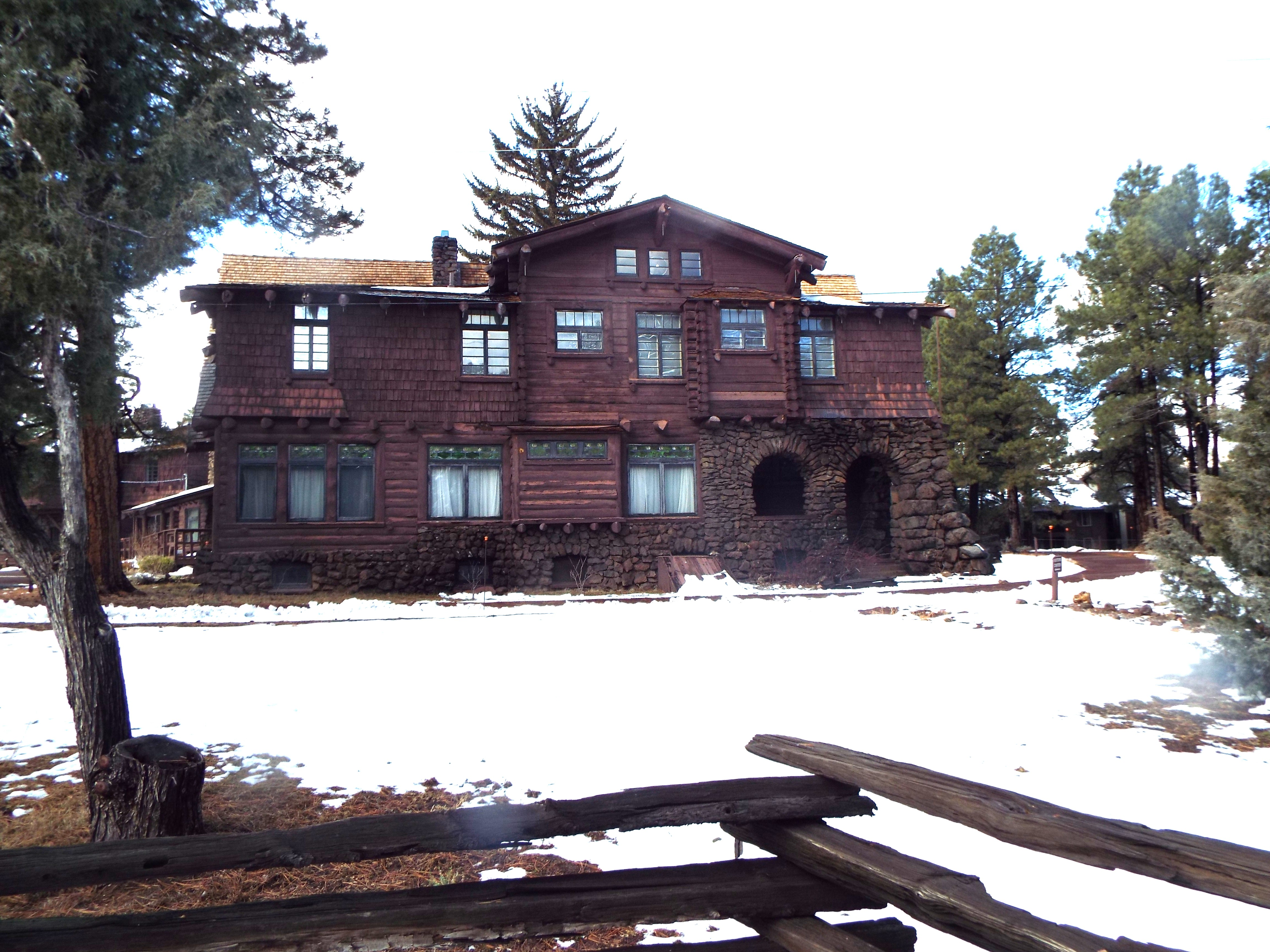
The Riorden Mansion

=== Historic bridges and structures ===
Historic bridges and structures
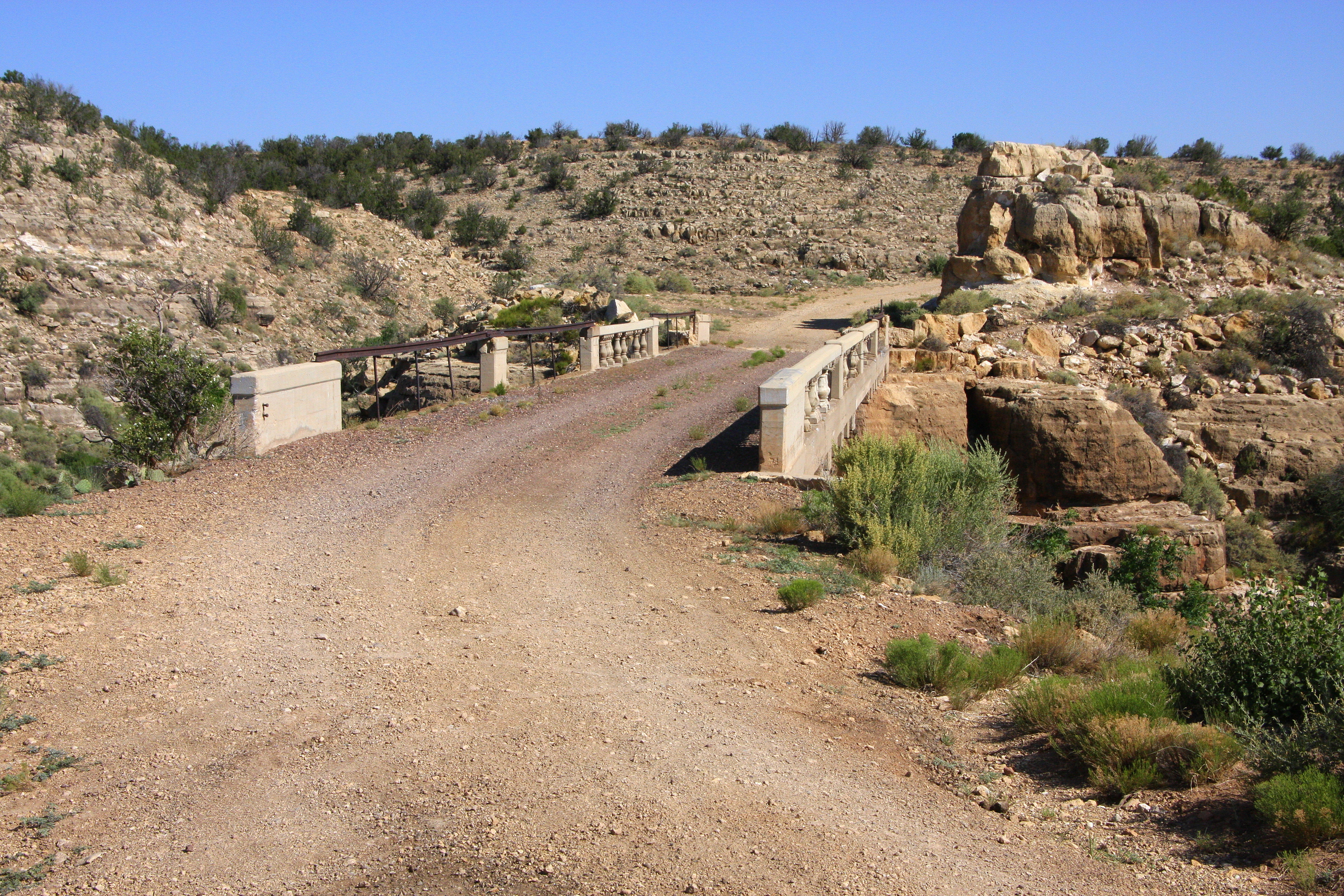
The Canyon Padre Bridge is located at the abandoned grade of Old U.S. Route 66 over Padre Canyon.

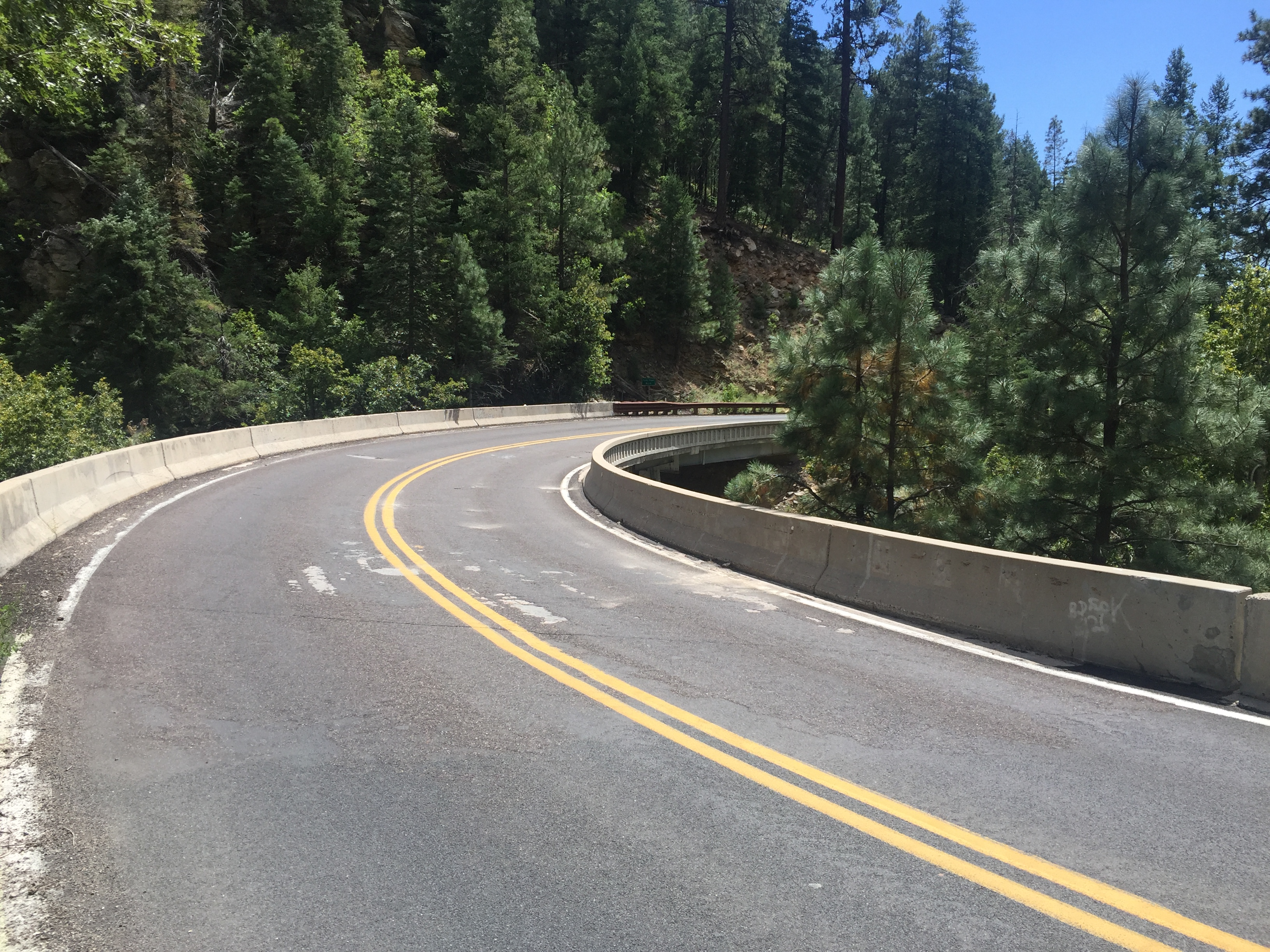
The Pumphouse Wash Bridge is located on Milepost 387.4 on U.S. Route 89 over Pumphouse Wash.

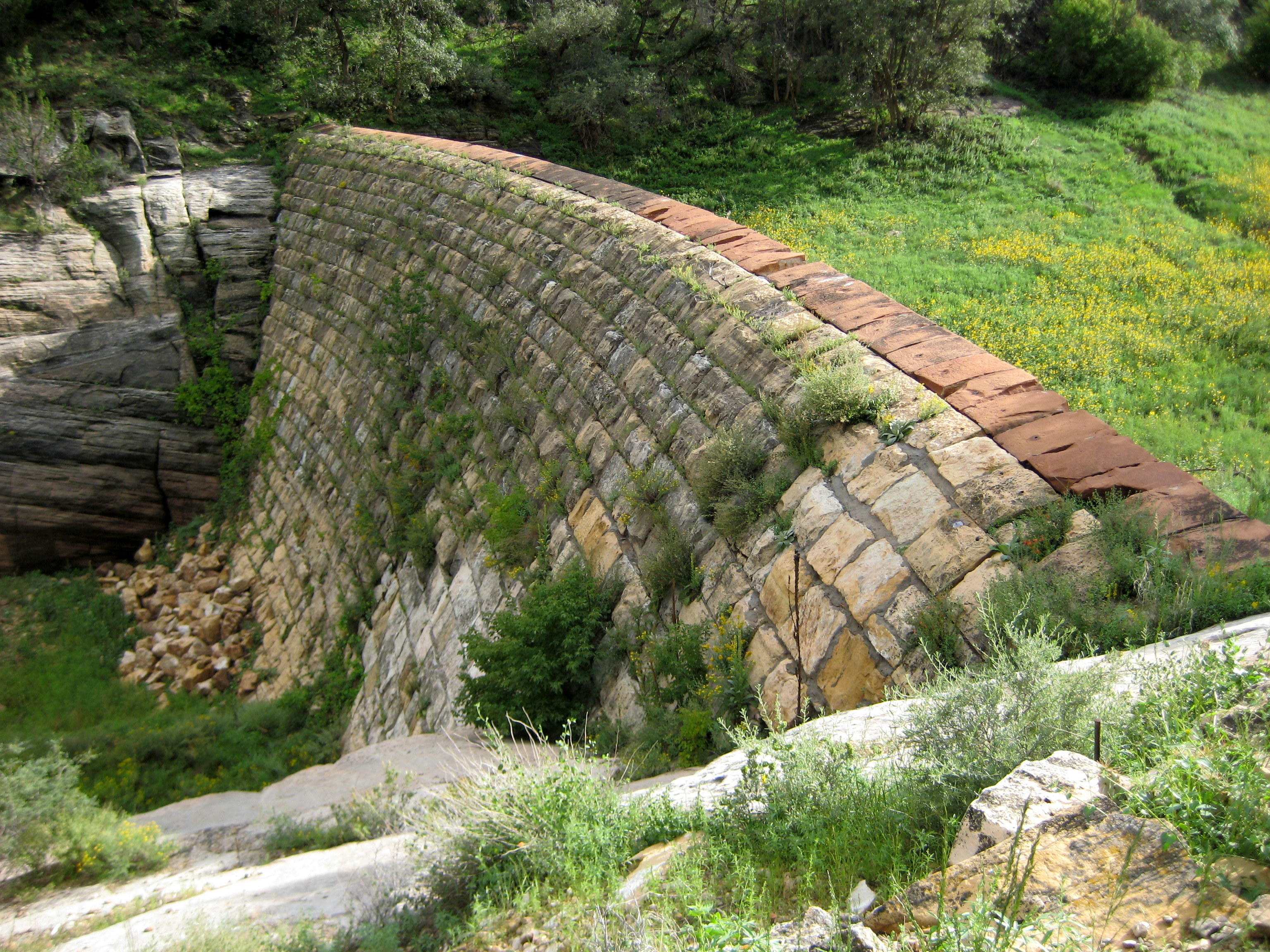
The Walnut Canyon Dam is located Southeast of Flagstaff.

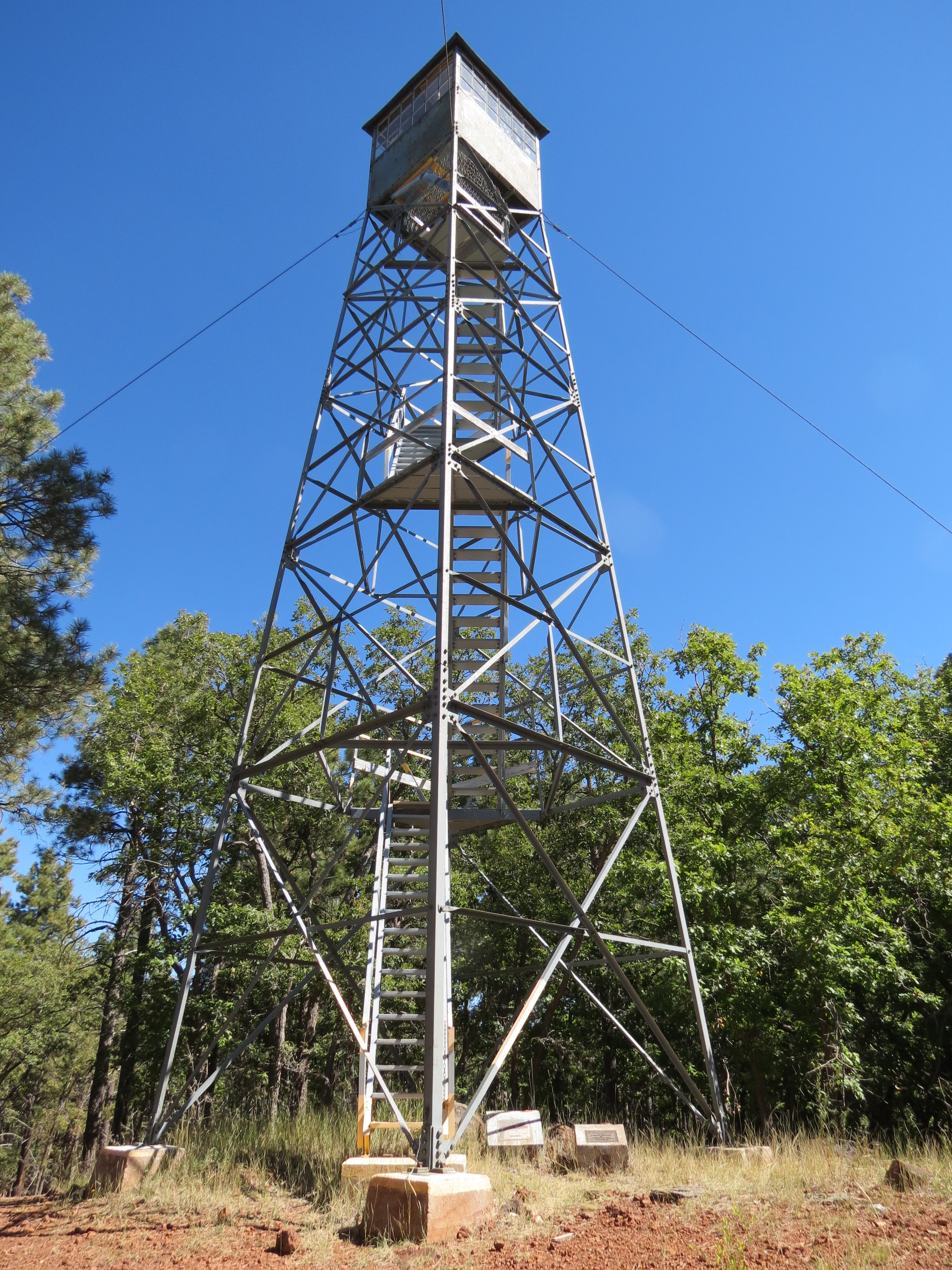
The Woody Mountain Lookout Tower is located by Rogers Lake.

=== Historic Districts ===
Historic Districts
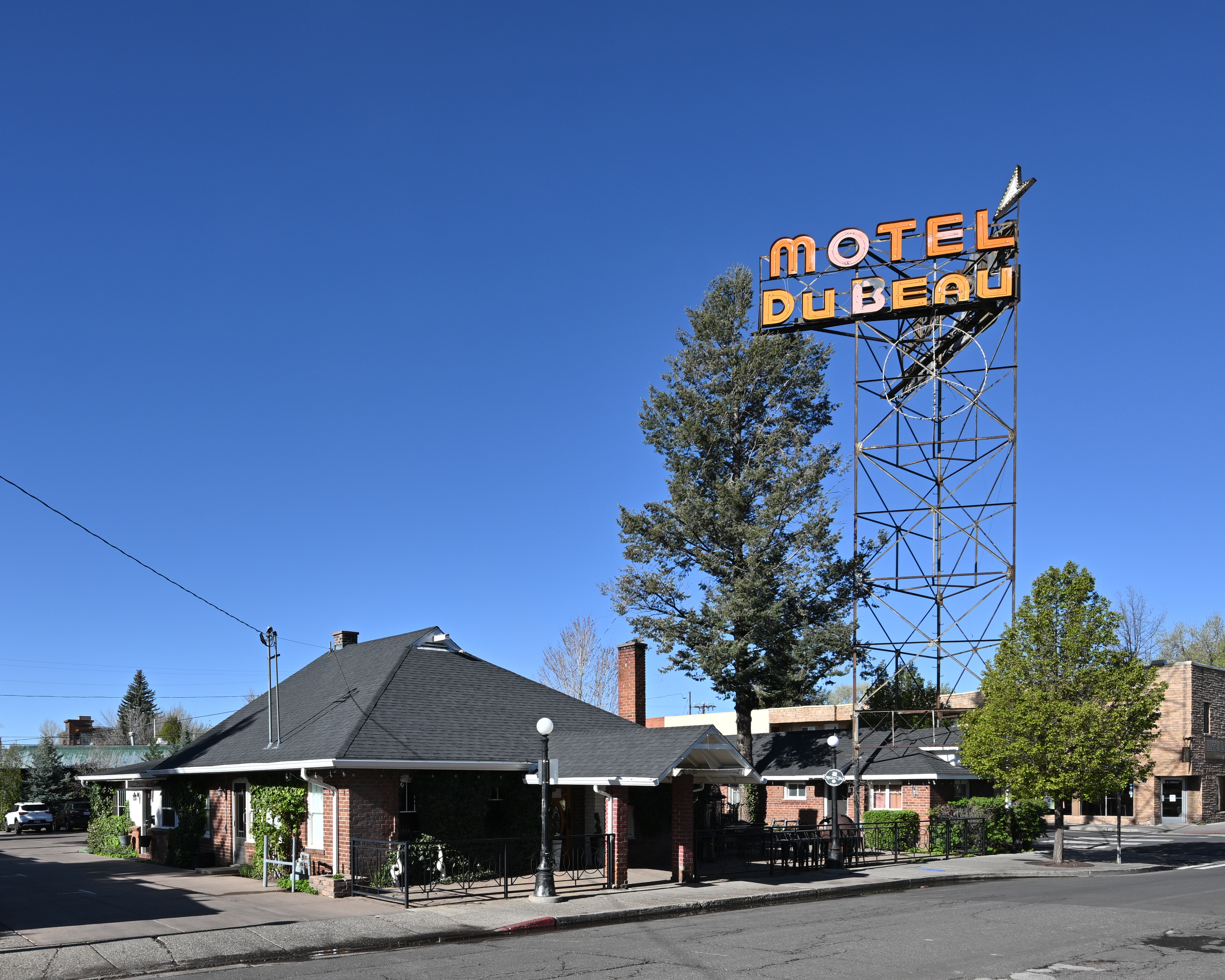
Flagstaff Southside Historic District is located on the South of downtown bordered by Route 66 and Santa Fe Railroad, Rio de Flag, and Northern Arizona University.

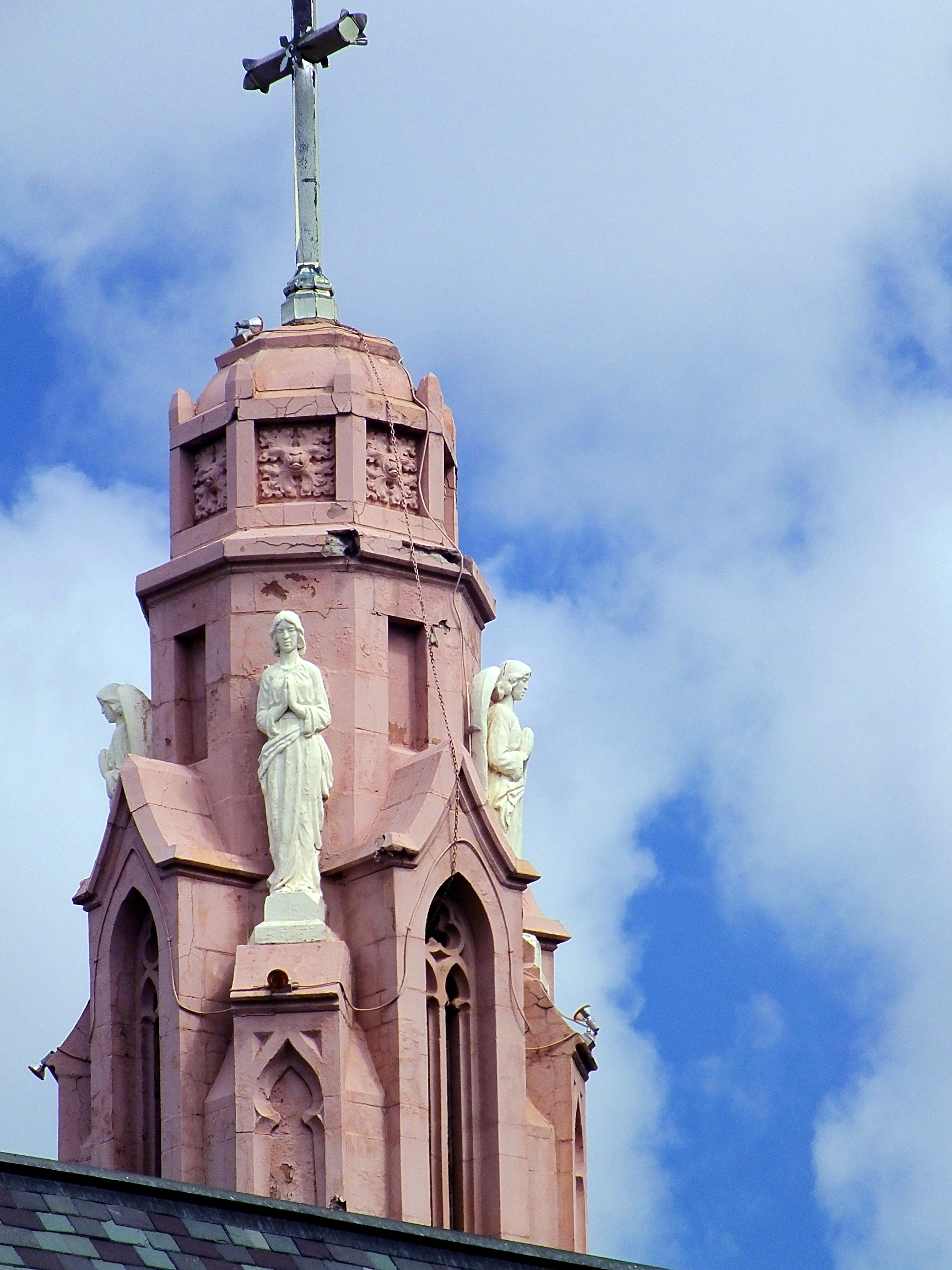
The Flagstaff Townsite Historic Residential District location is roughly bounded by Cherry, Humphreys and Sitgreaves Sts., Railroad Ave., and Toltec and Aztec Streets.

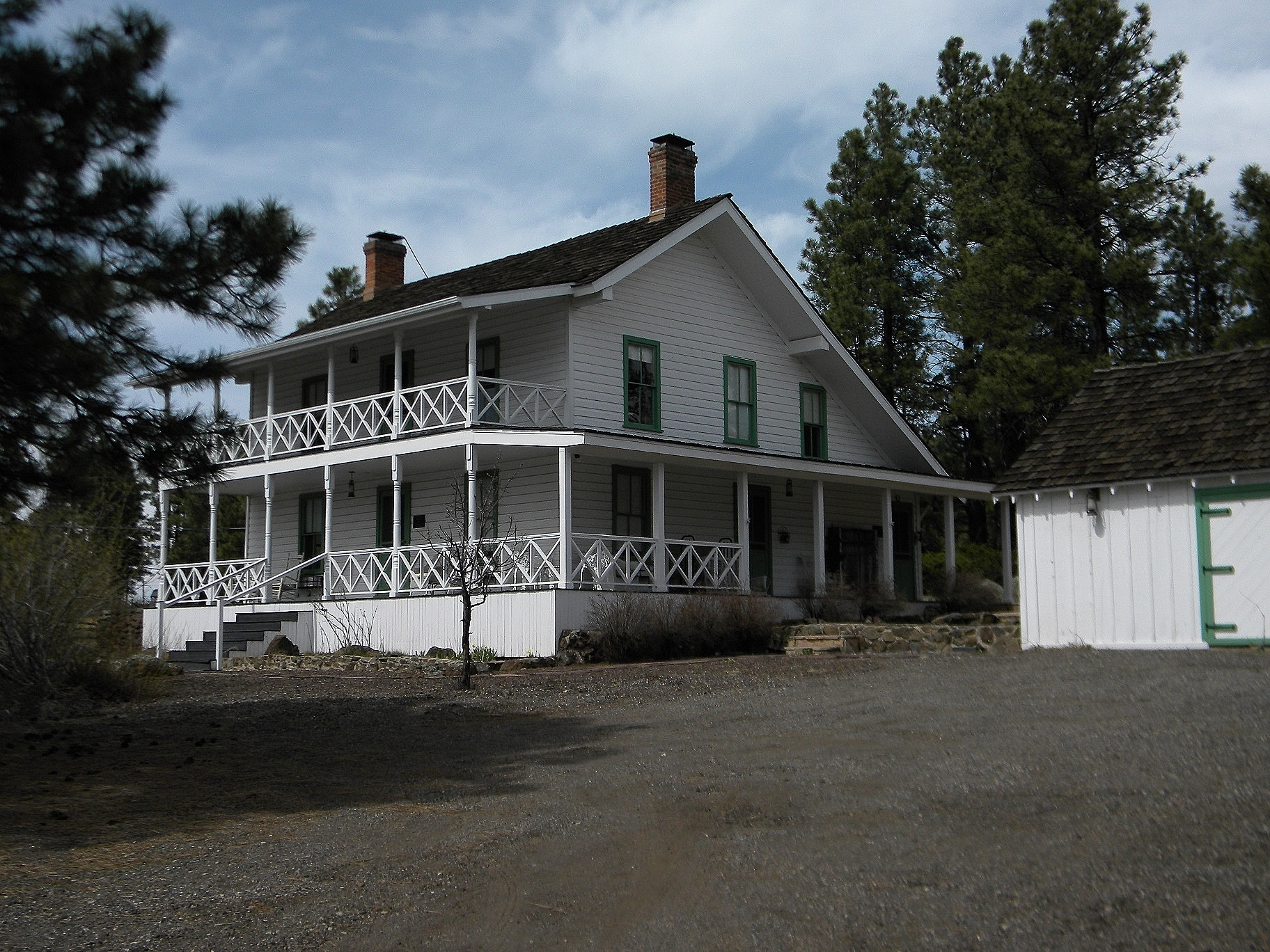
The Homestead is located north of Flagstaff on U.S. Route 180. Pictured is the 1885 McMillan House, one of the oldest homes in the area.

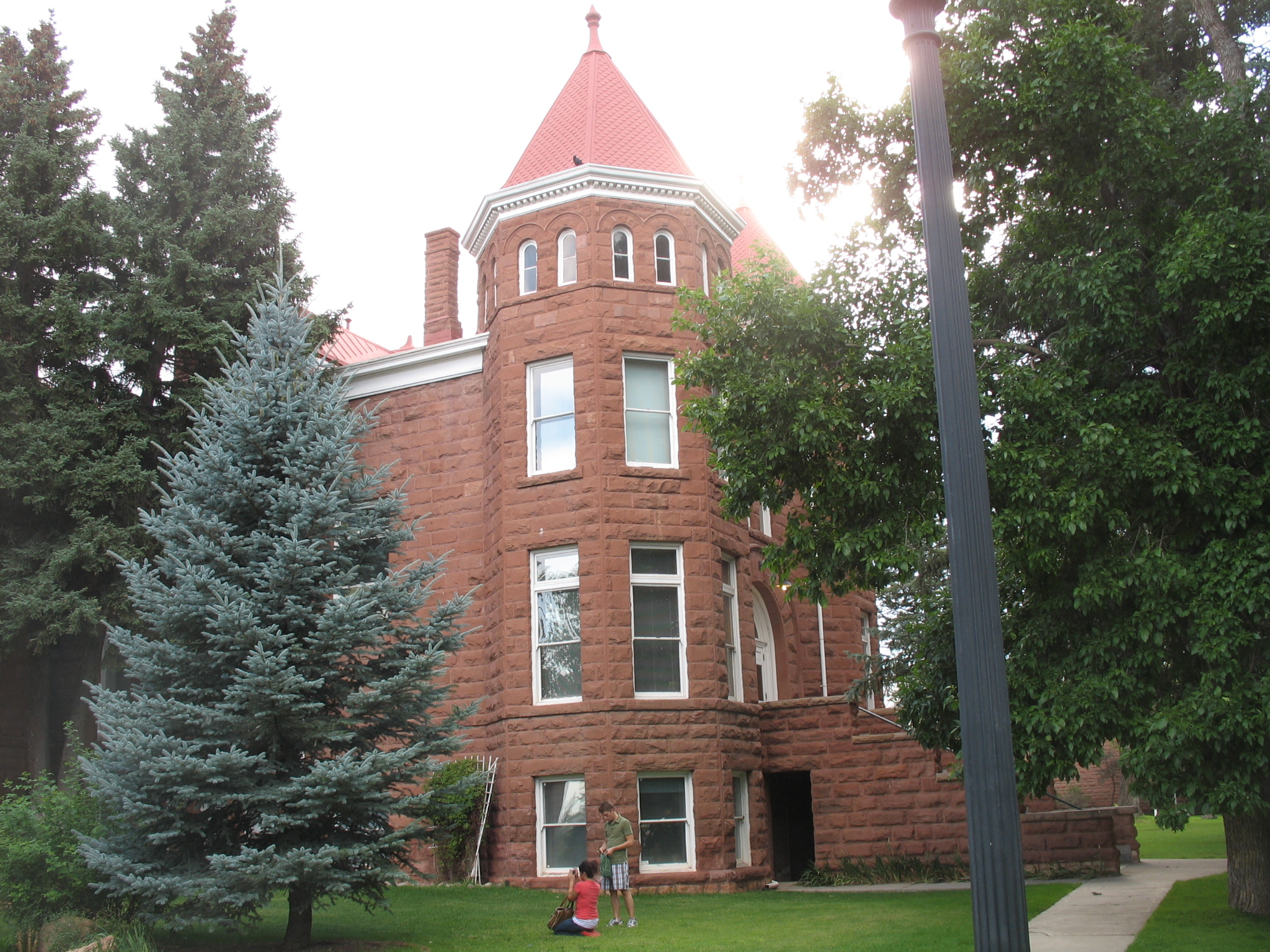
The Northern Arizona Normal School Historic District is located on the Northern Arizona University campus, near Route 66 on Milton Road.

=== Lowell Observatory ===
Historic Lowell Observatory

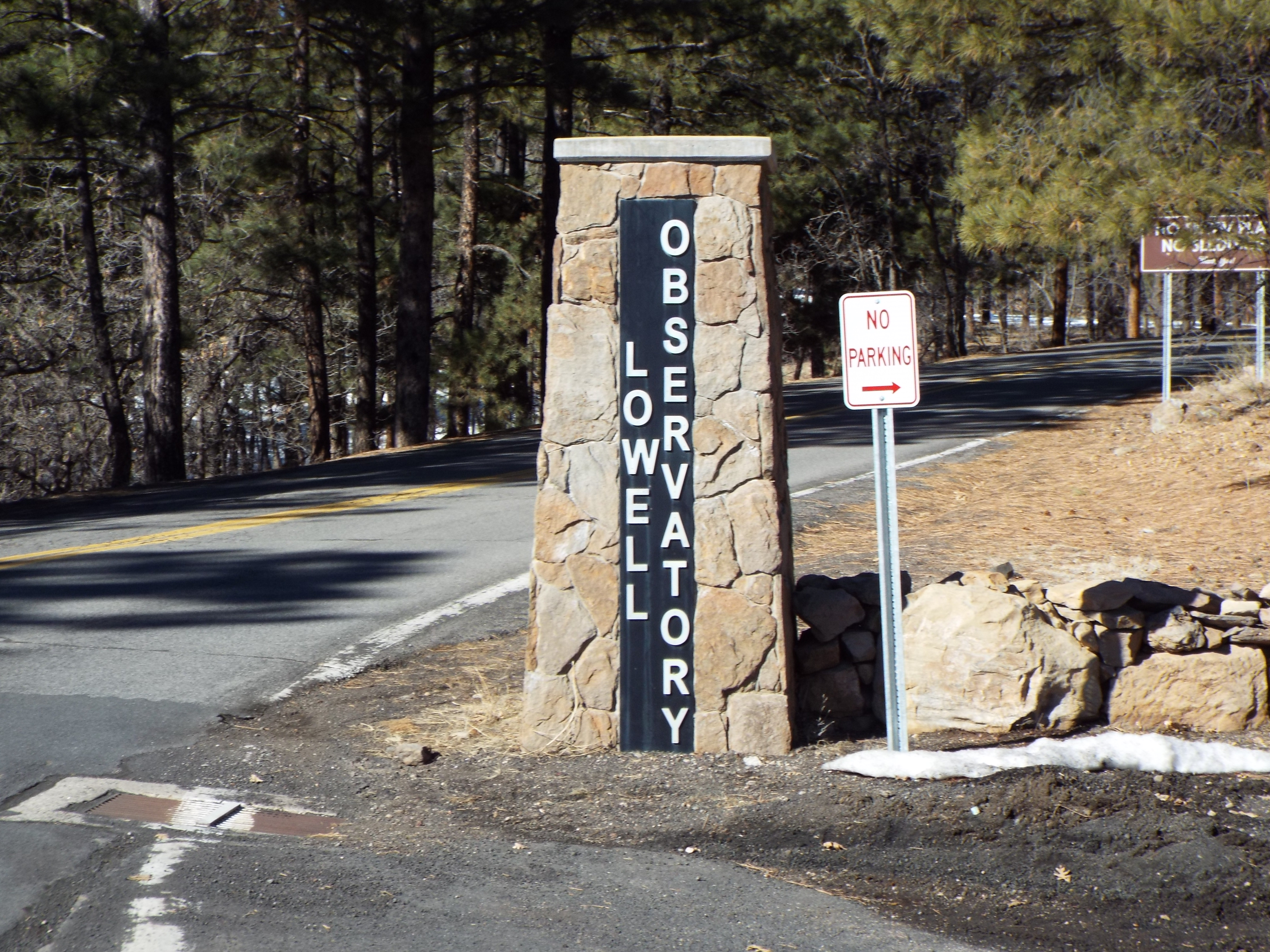
Lowell Observatory entrance

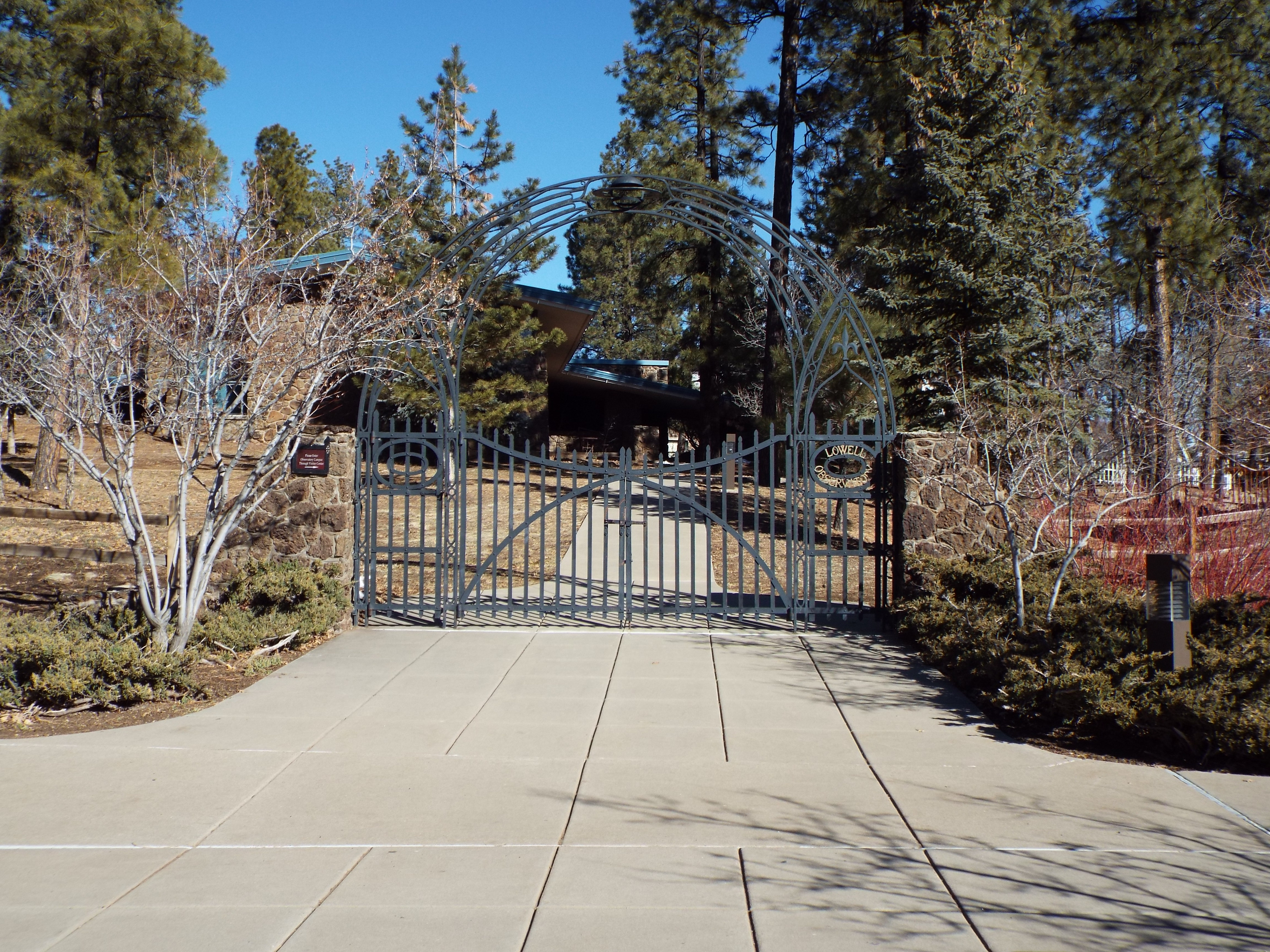
Lowell Observatory gate.

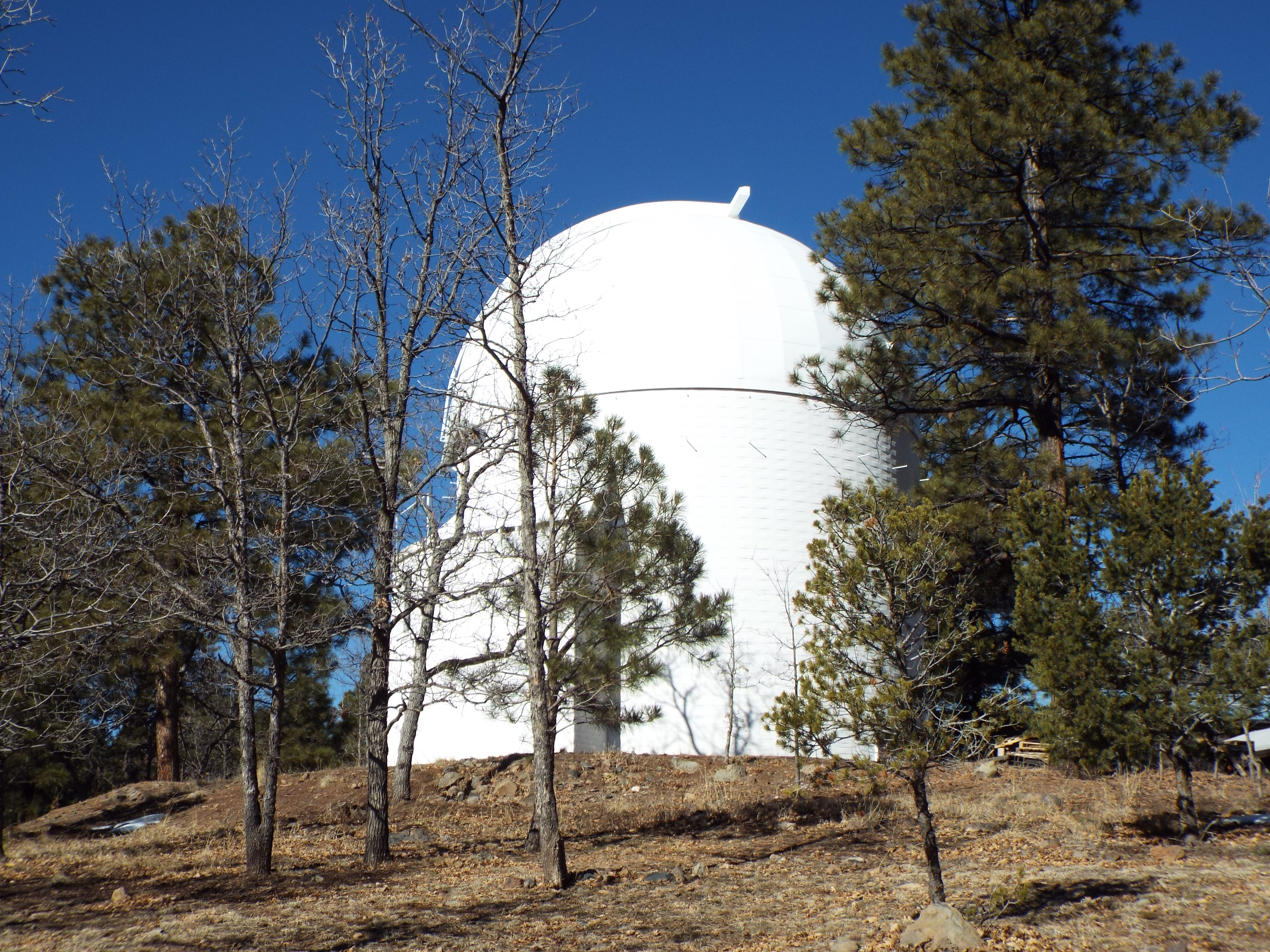
18" LENEOS Astrograph Dome.

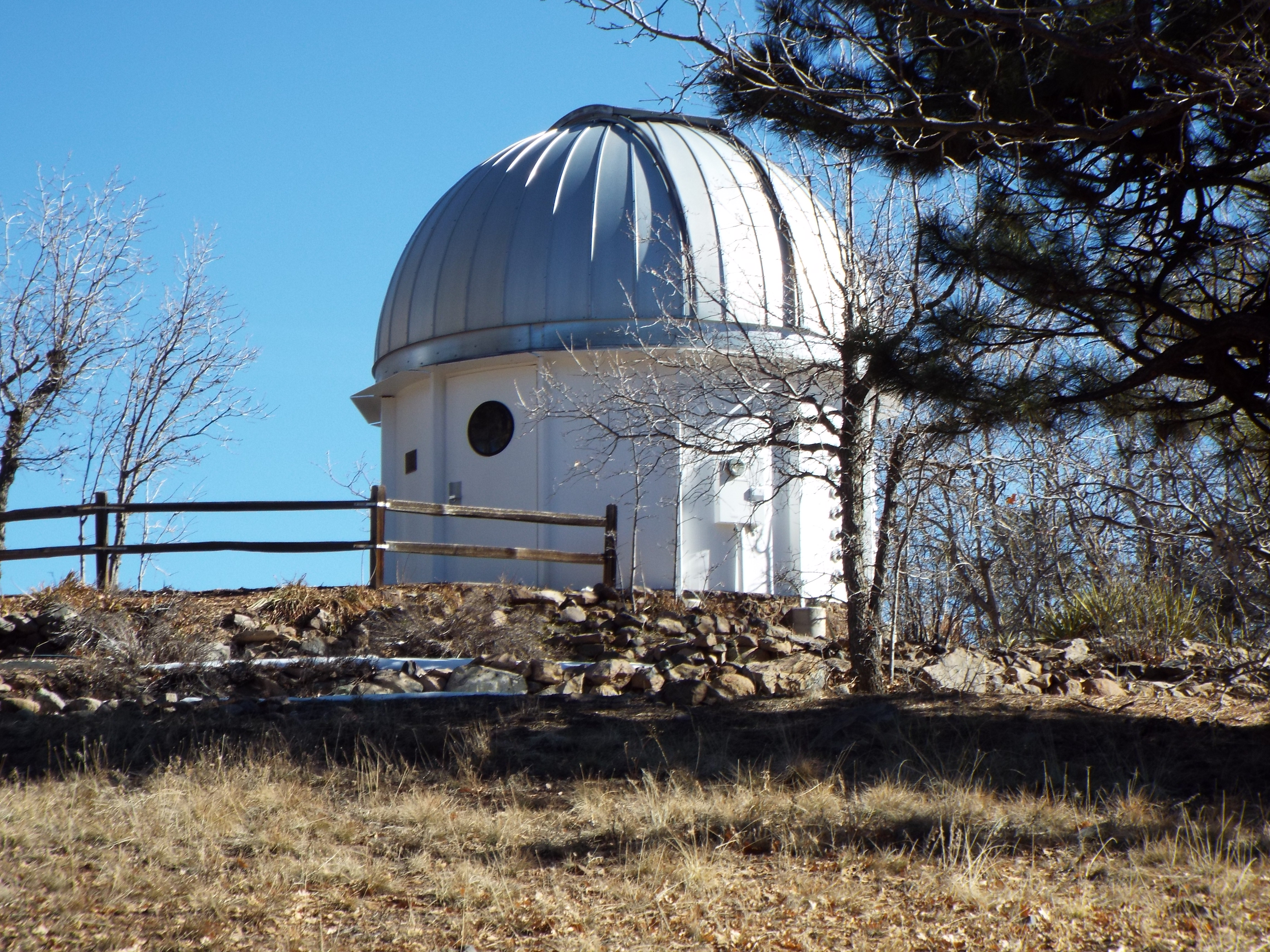
McAllister Dome.

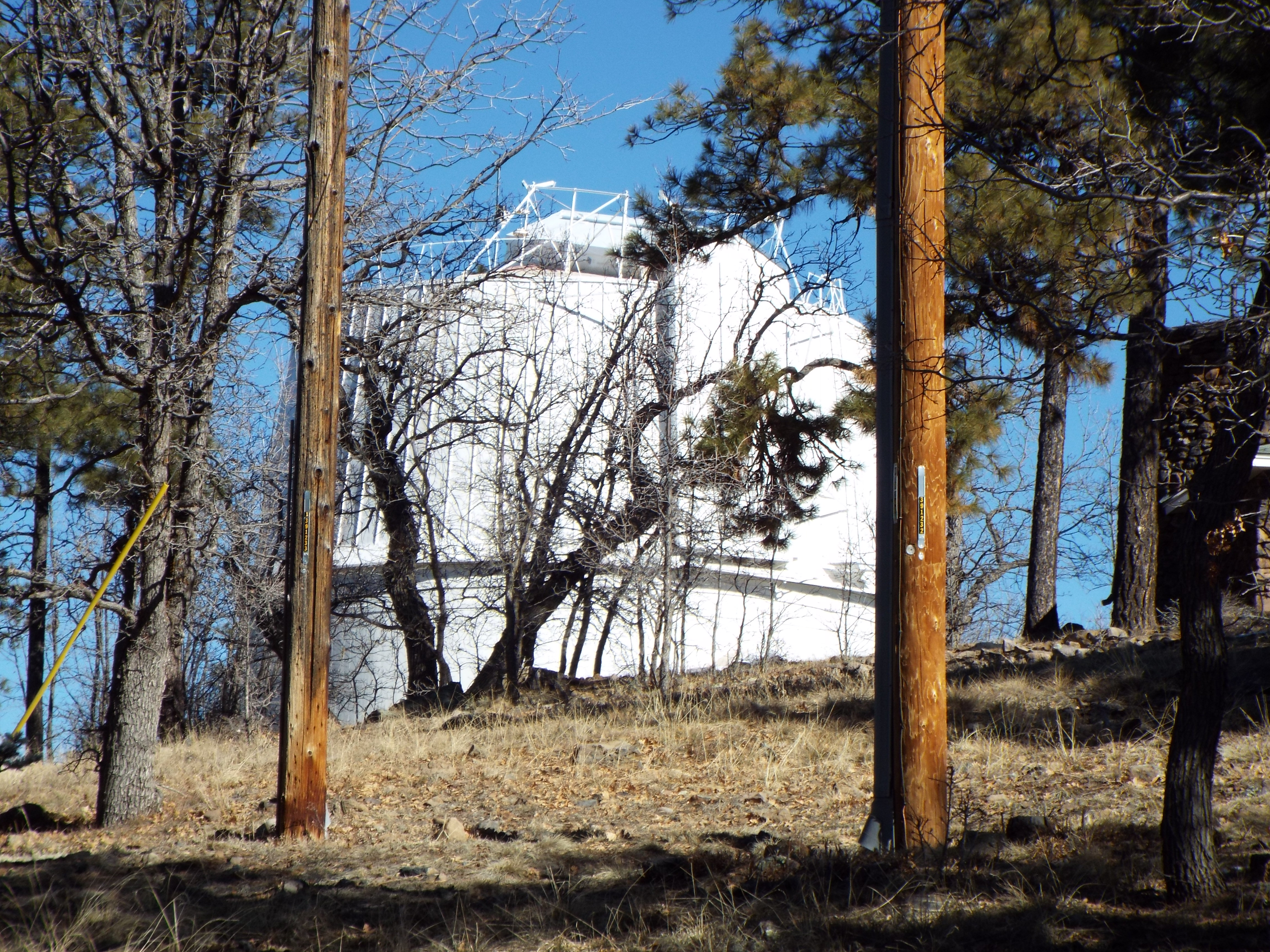
The Clark Telescope Dome on Mars Hill.

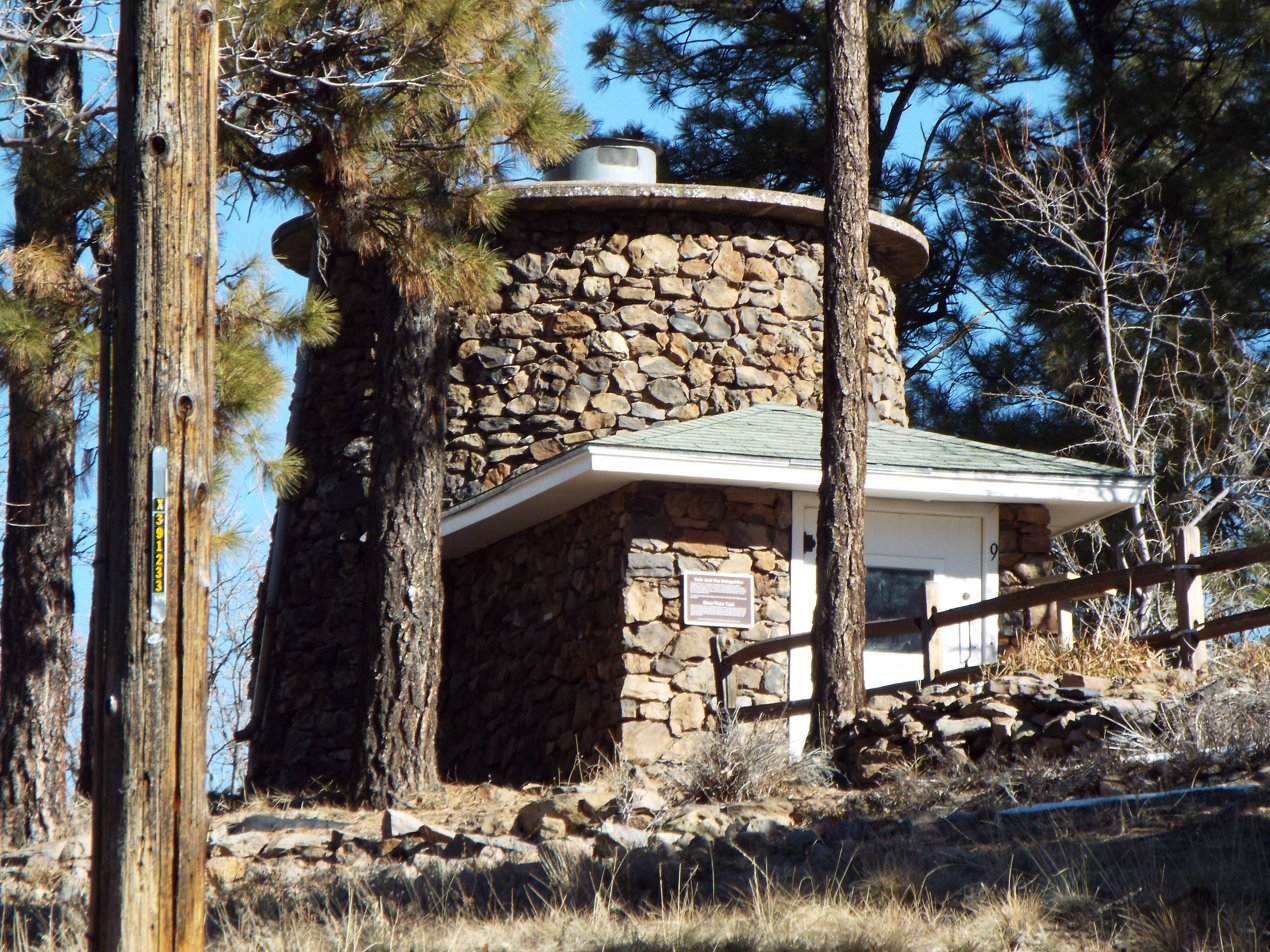
Stone Water Tank built in 1901

=== Flagstaff Citizens Cemetery ===
The historic Flagstaff Citizens Cemetery was established in 1891 and is located at 1300 South San Francisco St. This cemetery includes the 1956 TWA Disaster Memorial. The victims of the same crash, in United Airlines 718, are memorialized in Grand Canyon Pioneer Cemetery.

Buried in Tract J; Block A; Lot 13; Space 2 in the cemetery is the notable former Coconino County Sheriff Commodore Perry Owens. Owens confronted and killed three men in what became known as the Owens-Blevins Shootout during the Pleasant Valley War.

Also buried is astronomer Vesto Melvin Slipher (1875–1969). He was director of the Lowell Observatory in Flagstaff, Arizona, from 1916 to 1952. He made spectrographs of the atmospheres of Jupiter, Saturn, and Uranus. He also photographed Mars and was part of the team that discovered the ninth planet, Pluto, in March 1930.

Historic Flagstaff Citizen Cemetery

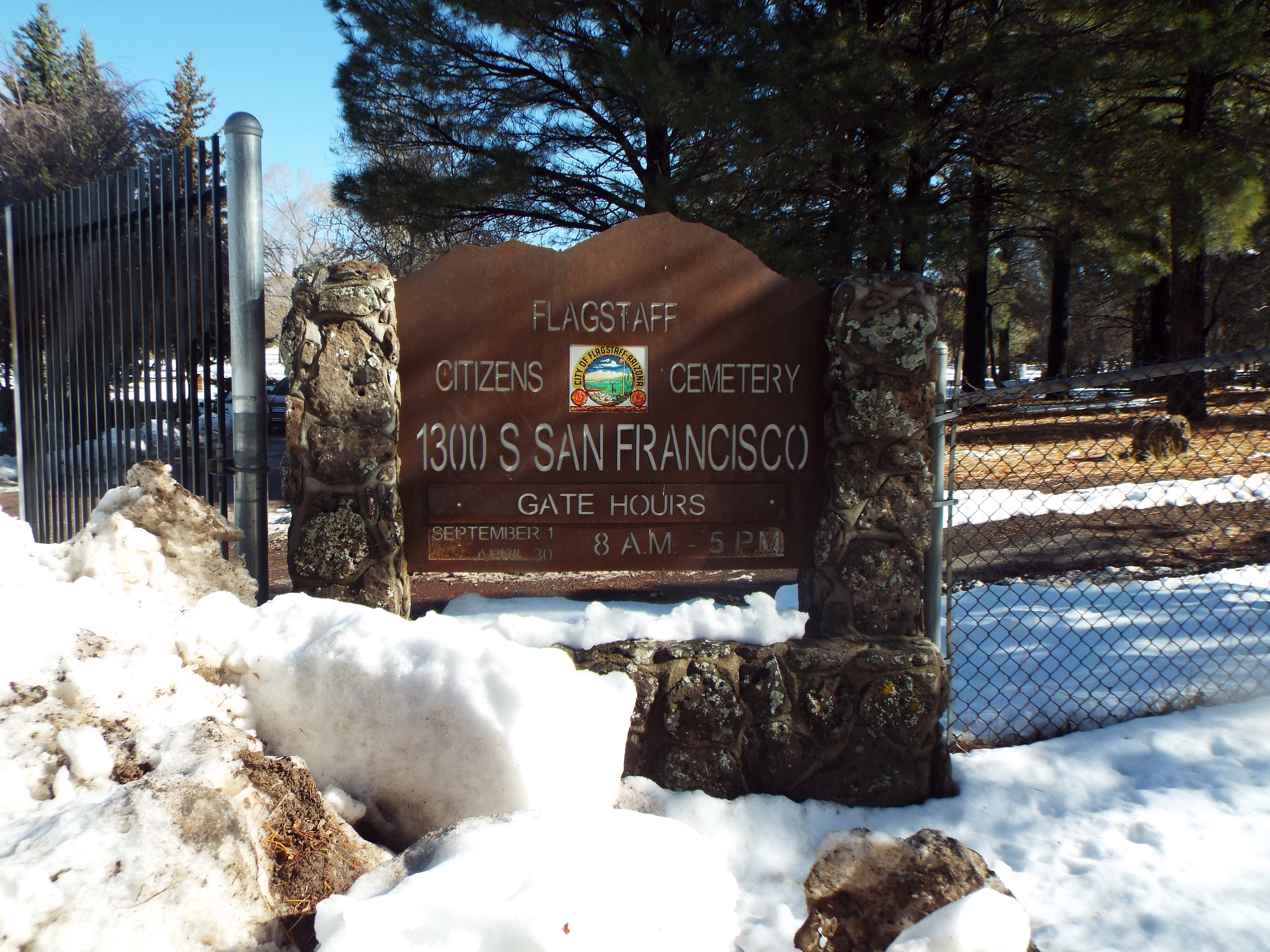
Citizen Cemetery entrance

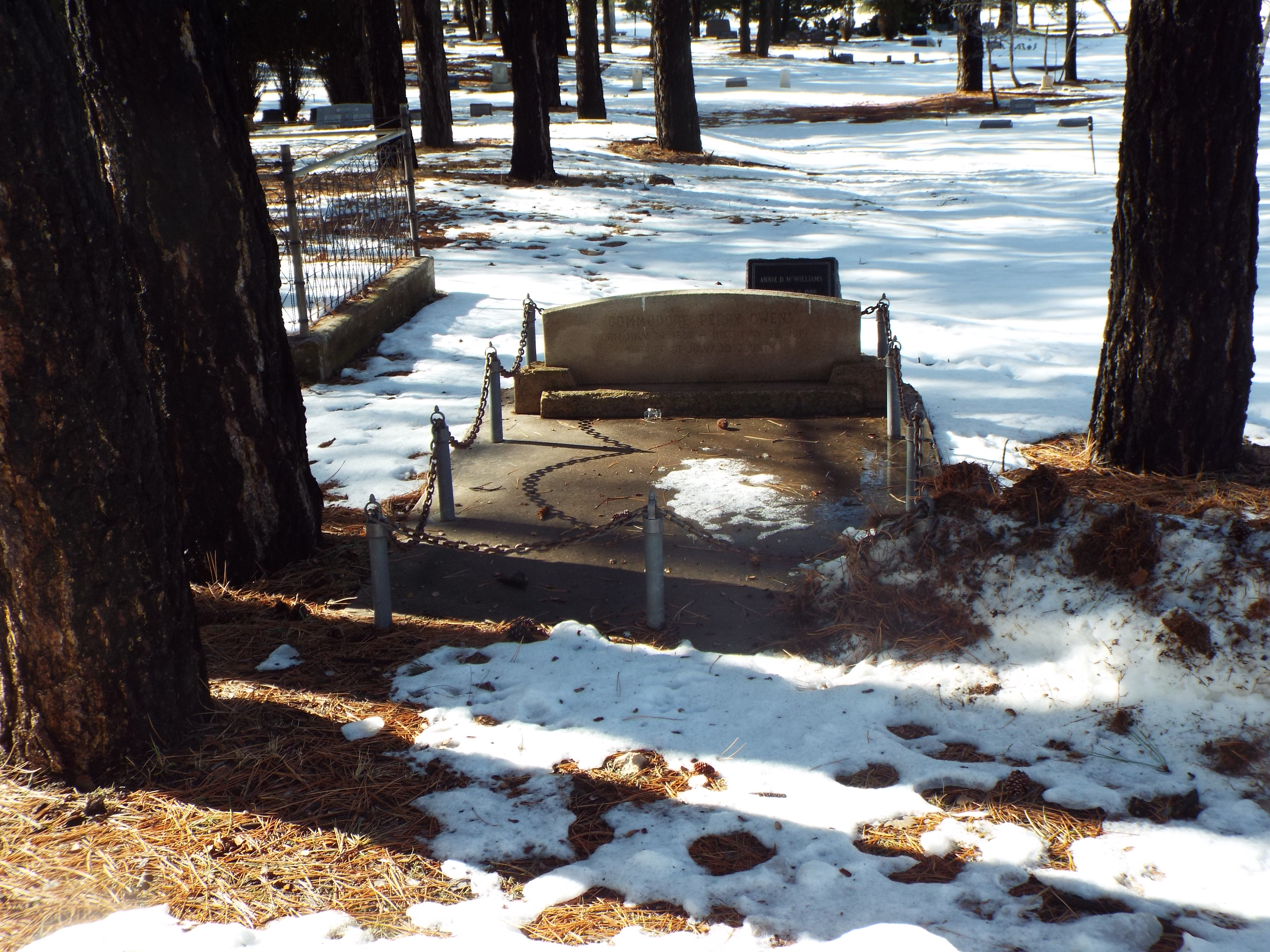
Grave of Commodore Perry Owen

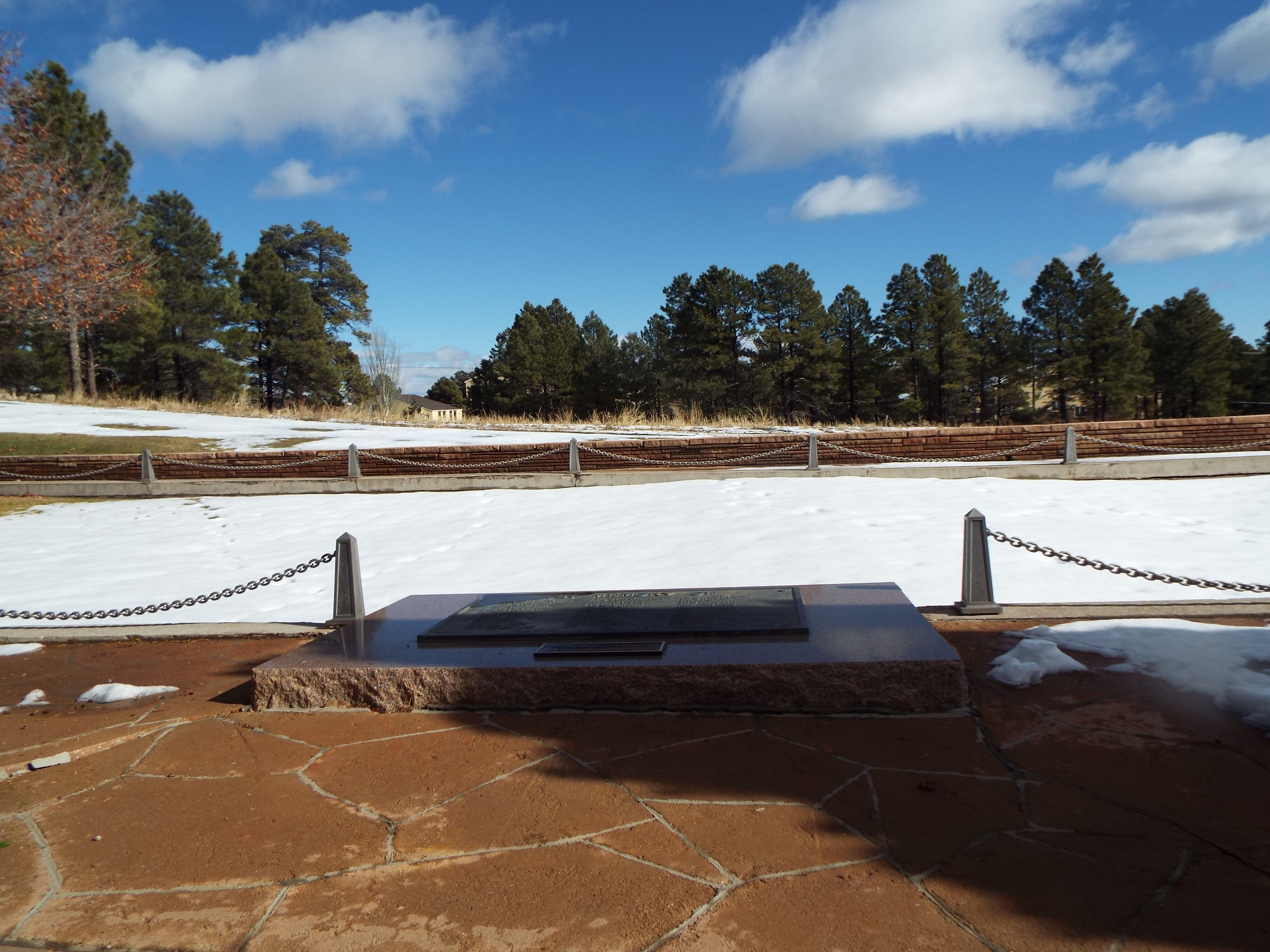
Mass Grave of those who perished in the 1956 TWA disaster

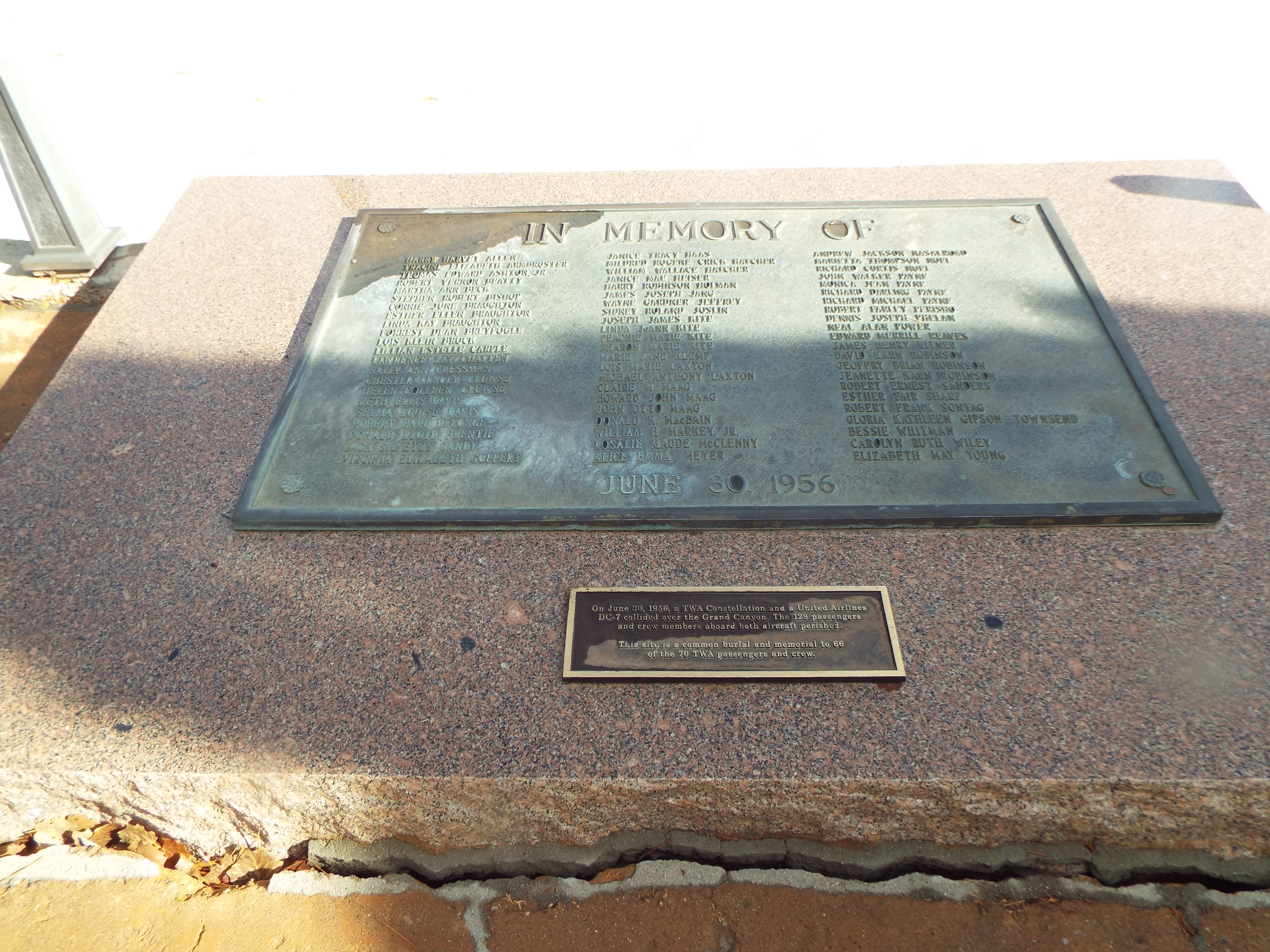
Plaque honoring those who perished in the 1956 TWA disaster

=== Elden Pueblo ===
Elden Pueblo, originally known as Pasiwvi ("Pah-see-'oo-vi") by the Native-American Hopi tribe, was an ancient village inhabited by the Hopi's from 1070 AD to 1275 AD. Euro-Americans arrived in the area in the 1870s and named the nearby mountain Elden Mountain. after John Elden, a sheepherder. Archaeologists referred to the Hopi's as "Sinagua" which in Spanish means "without water". They also named the ruins after Mount Elden. Elden Pueblo, which is located just off highway 89A, is preserved as a cultural heritage site by the US Forest Service.

Elden Pueblo

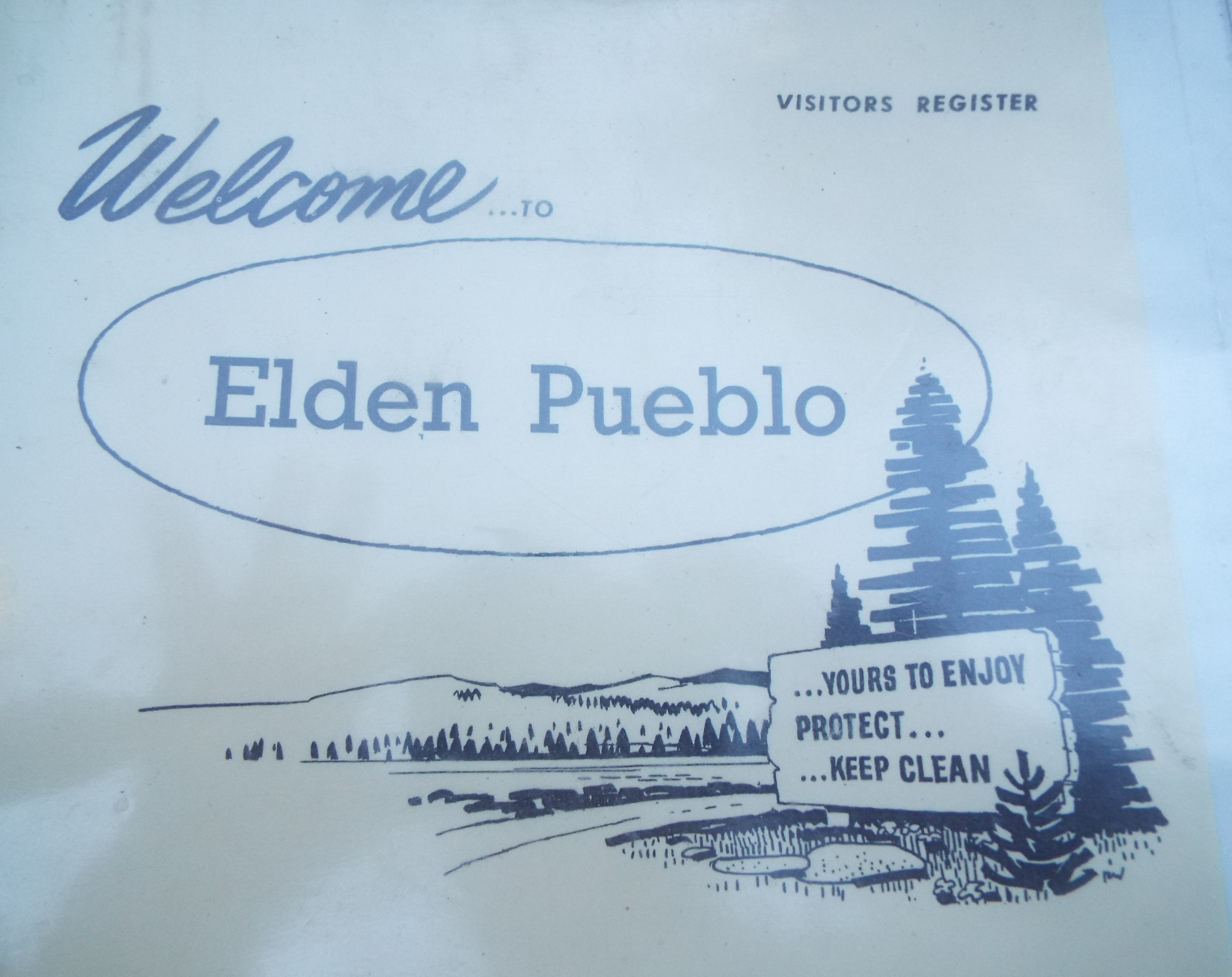
Elden Pueblo entrance sign

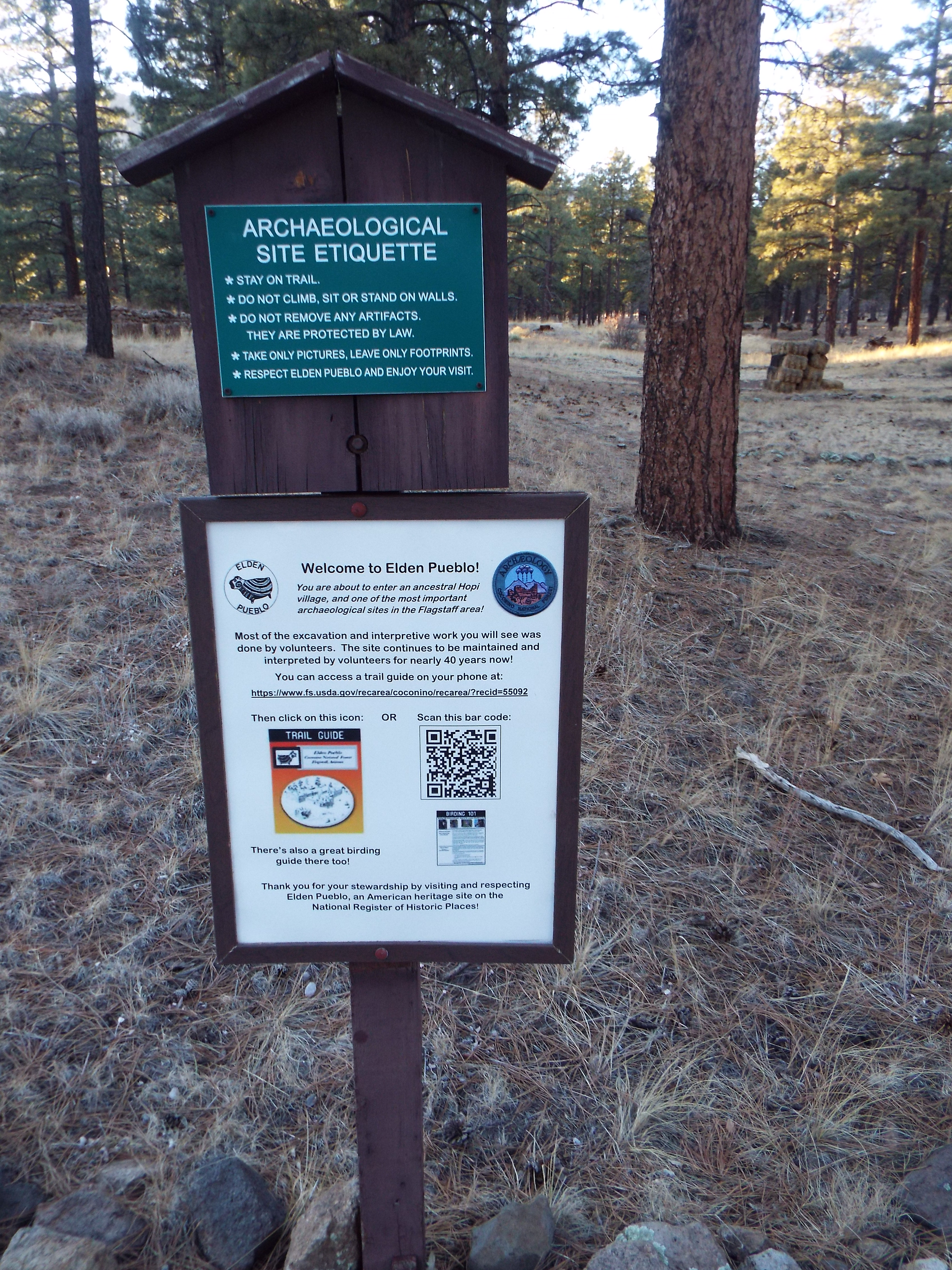
Elden Pueblo Archaeological sign

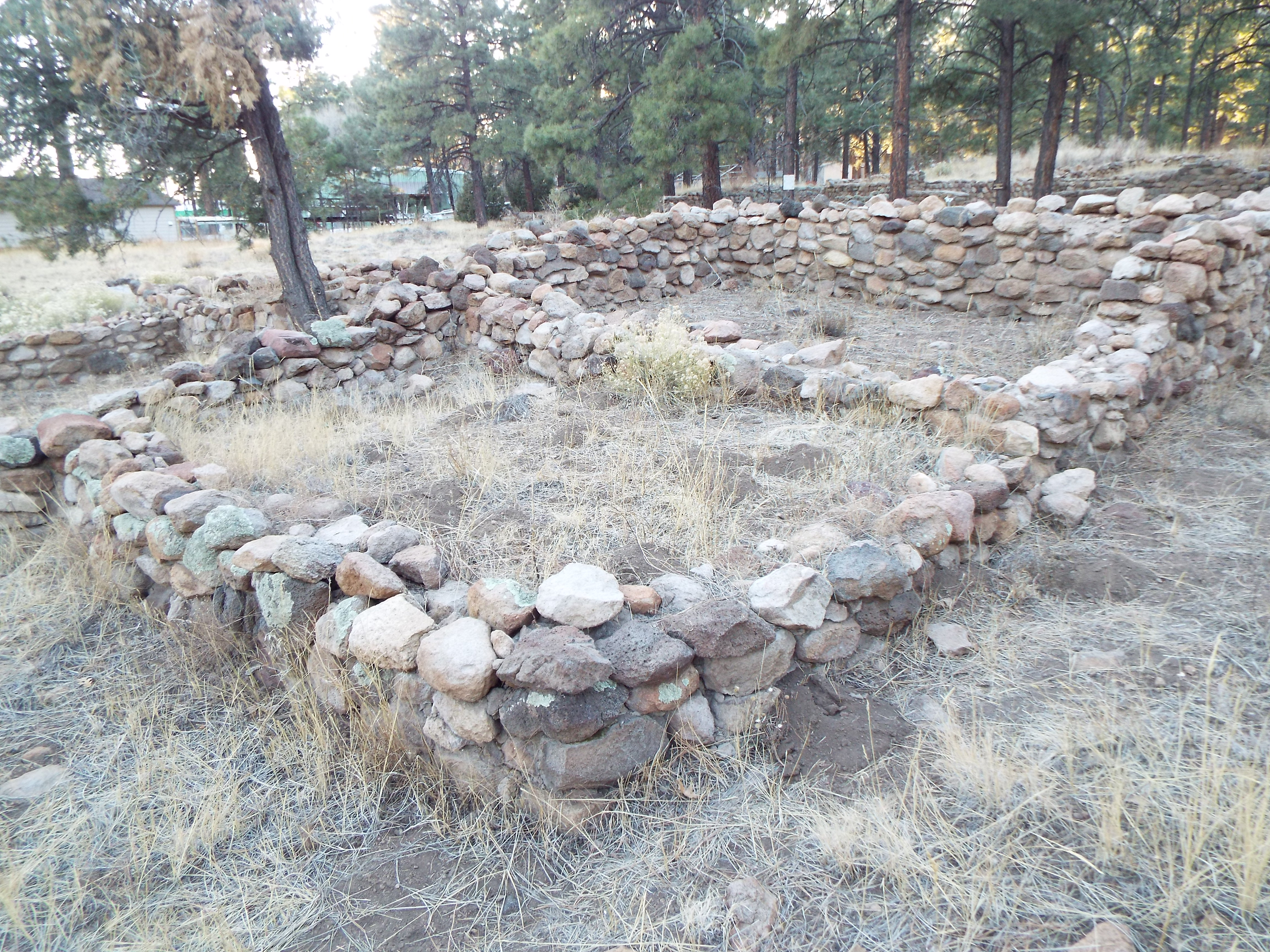
Elden Pueblo Structure

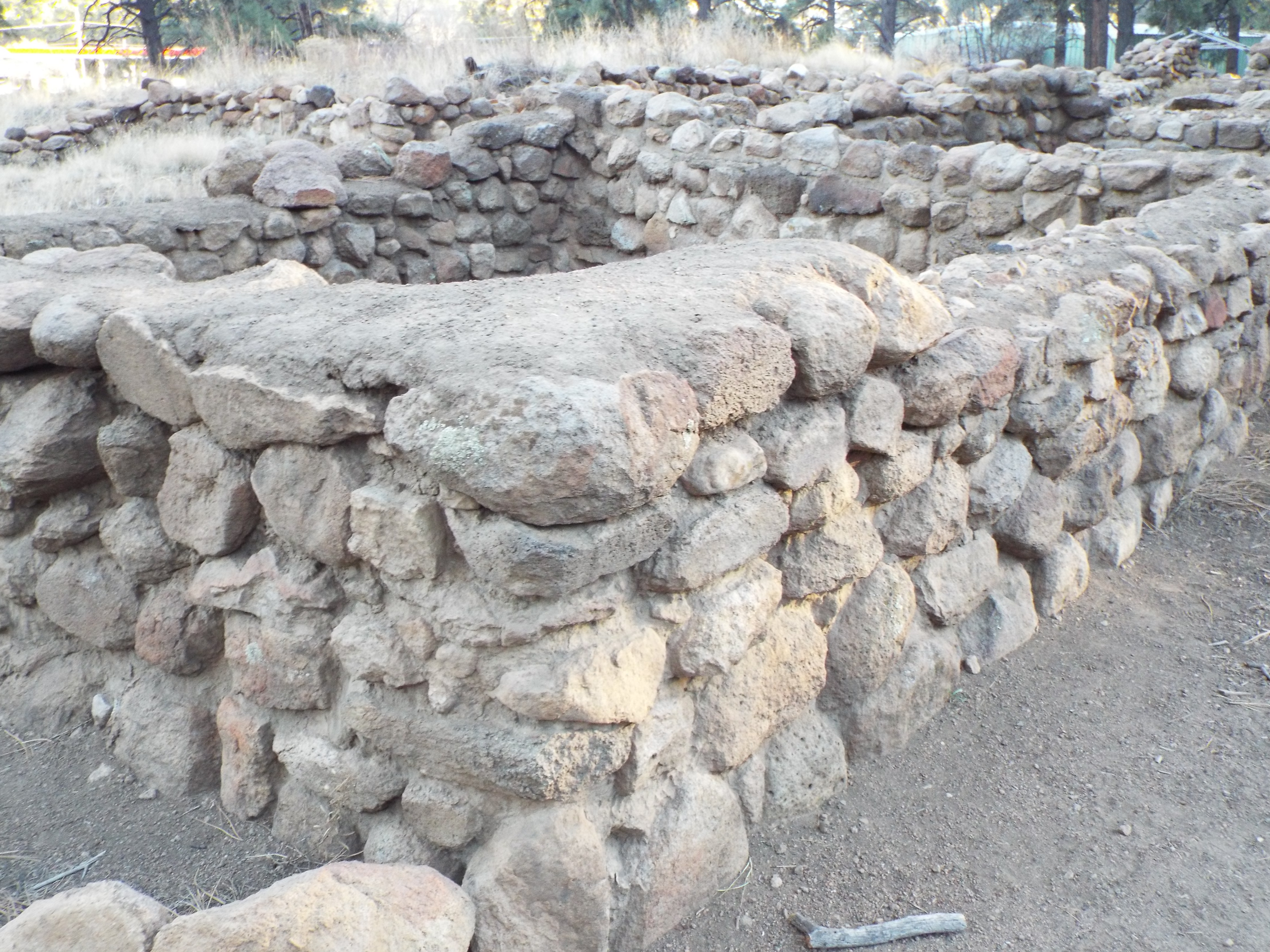
Room

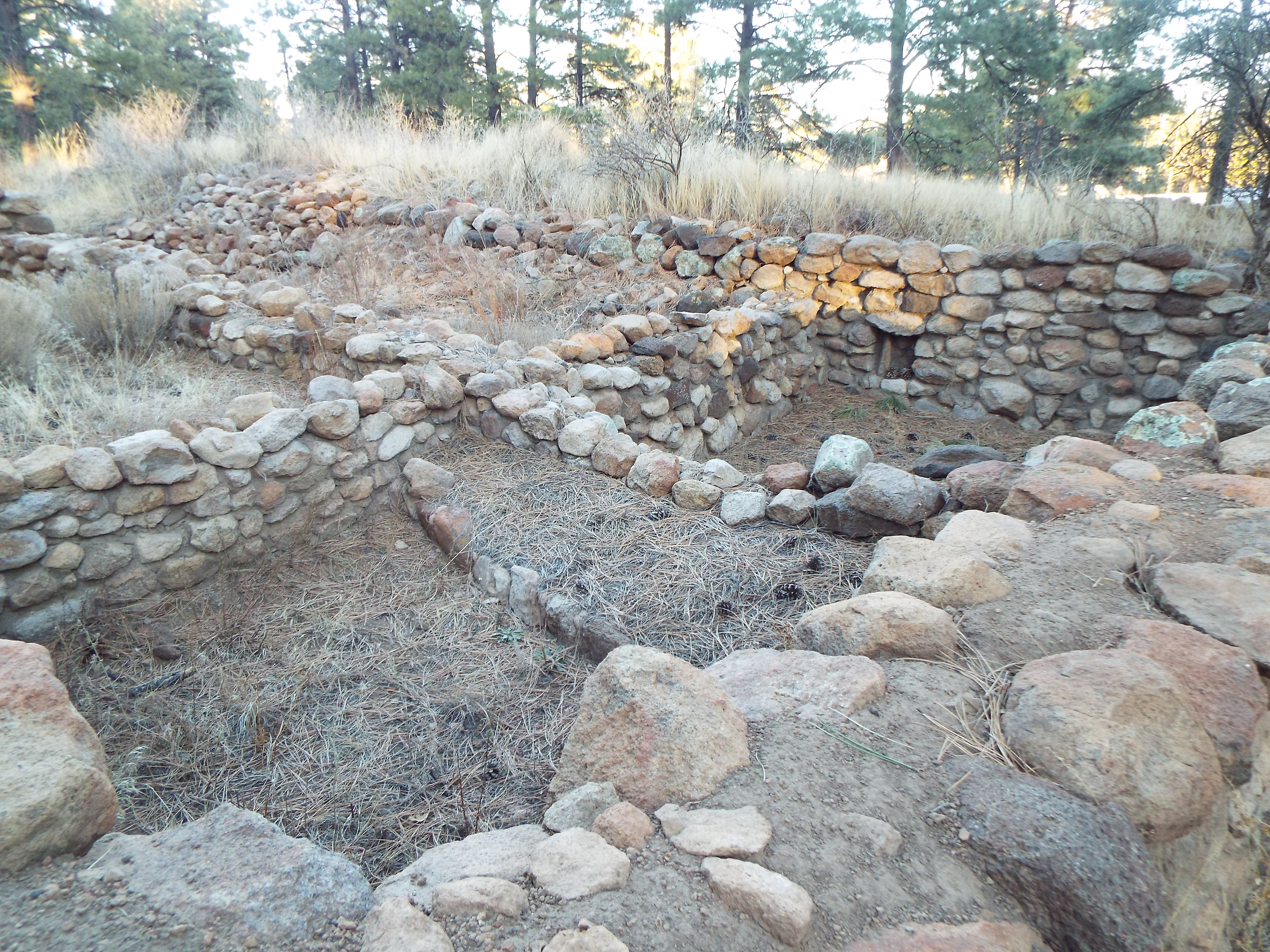
Mud Mortar Room

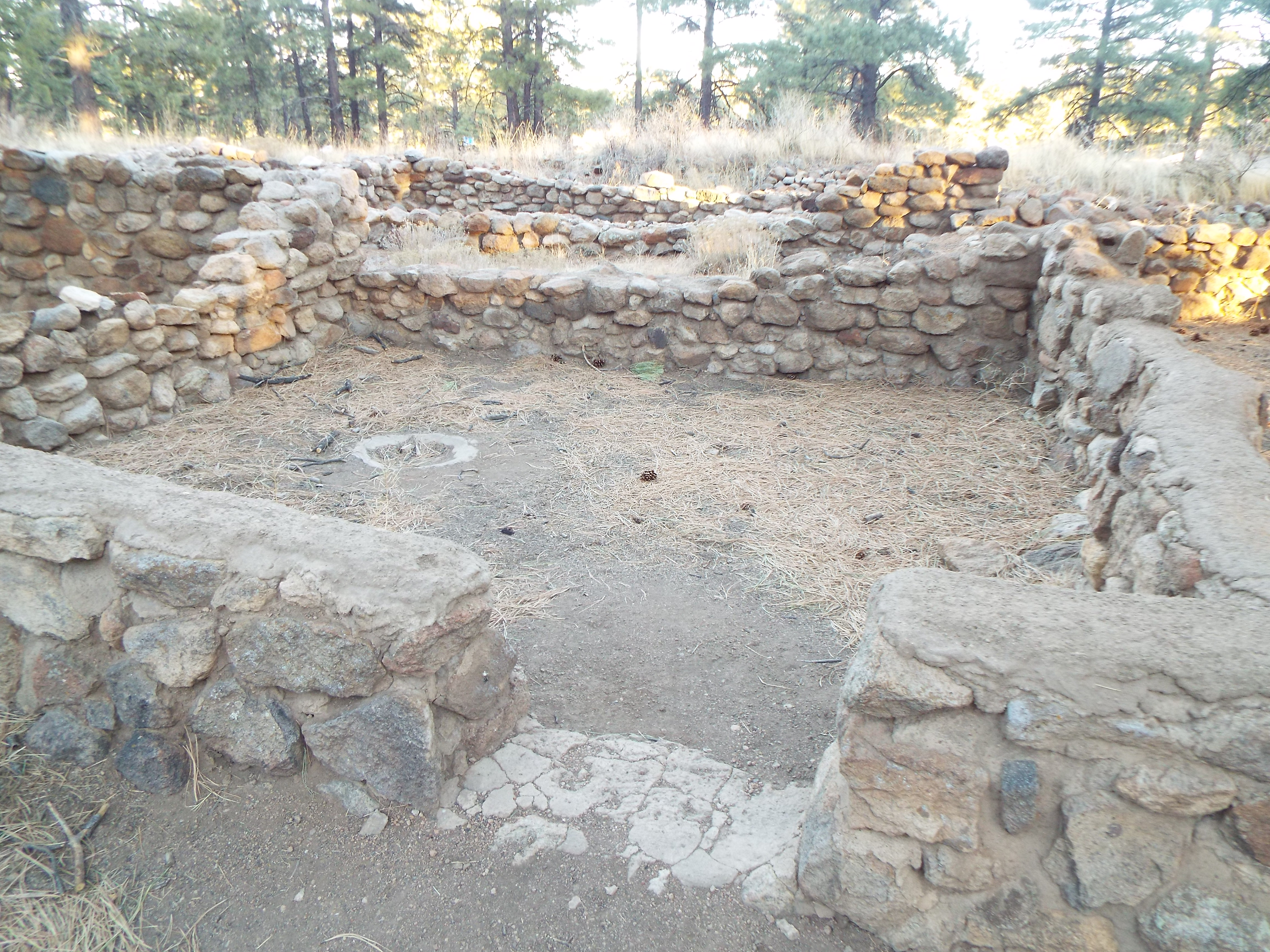
Mud Mortar Rooms

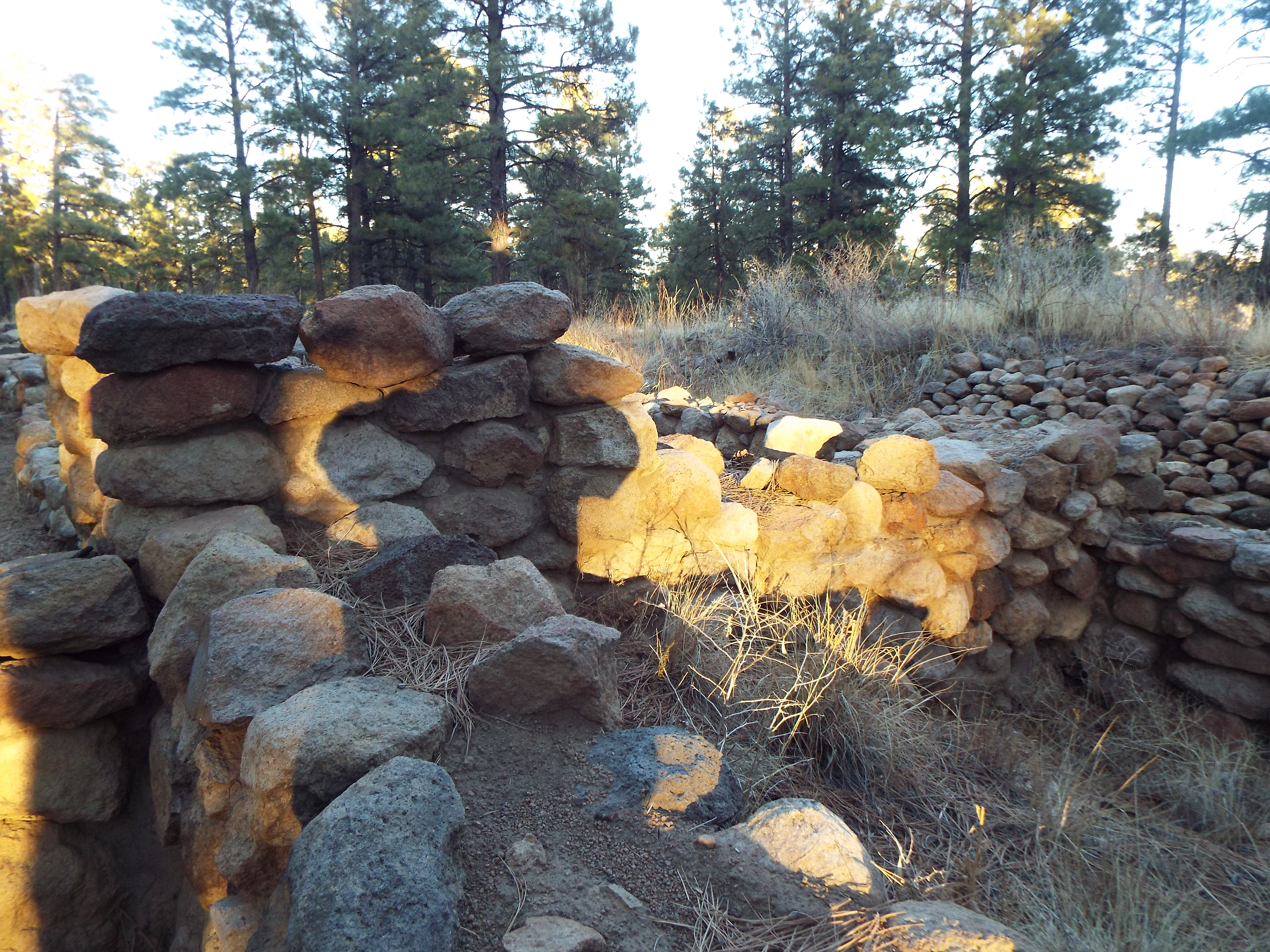
Mud Mortar Room

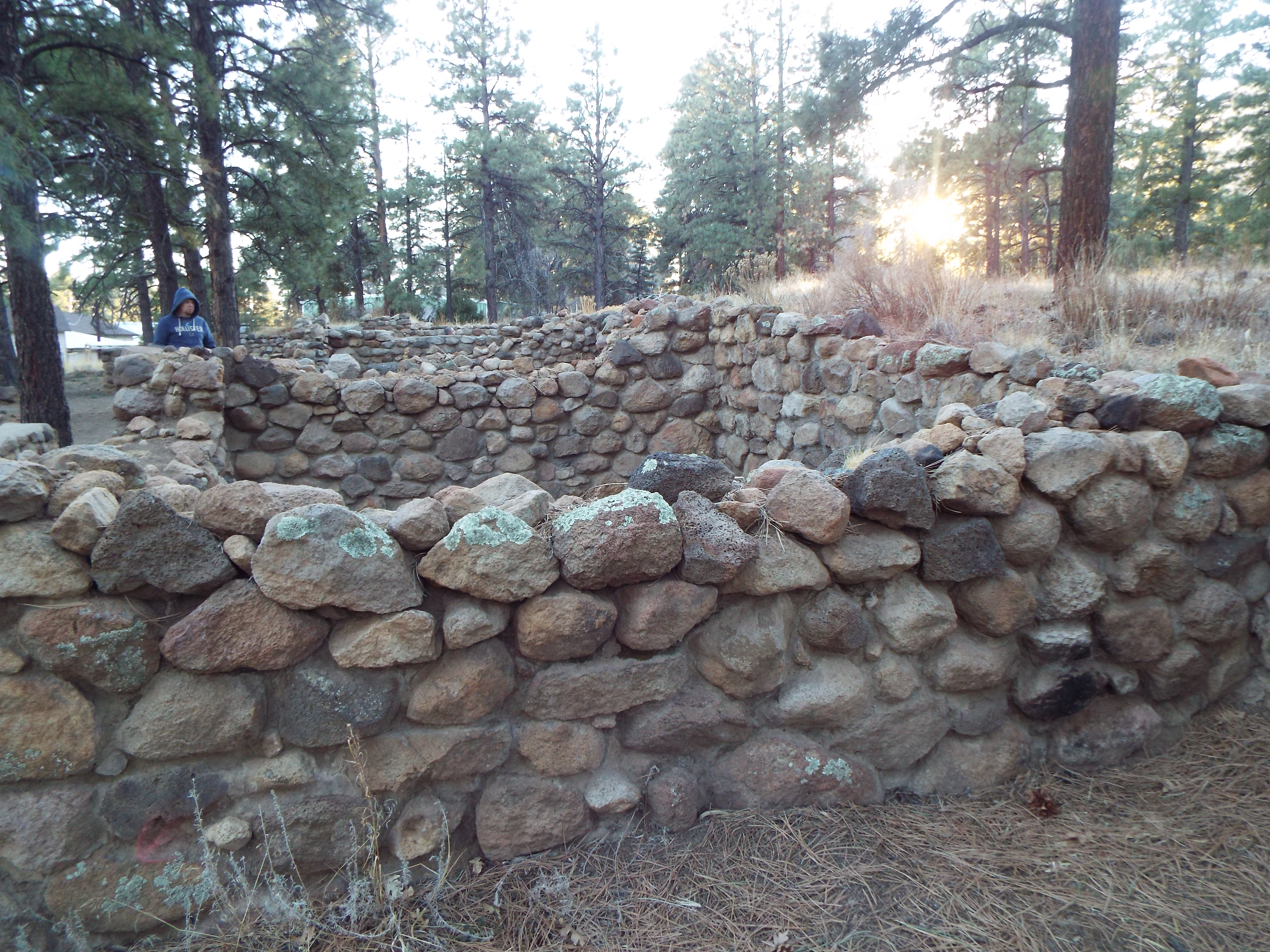
Early Pit House

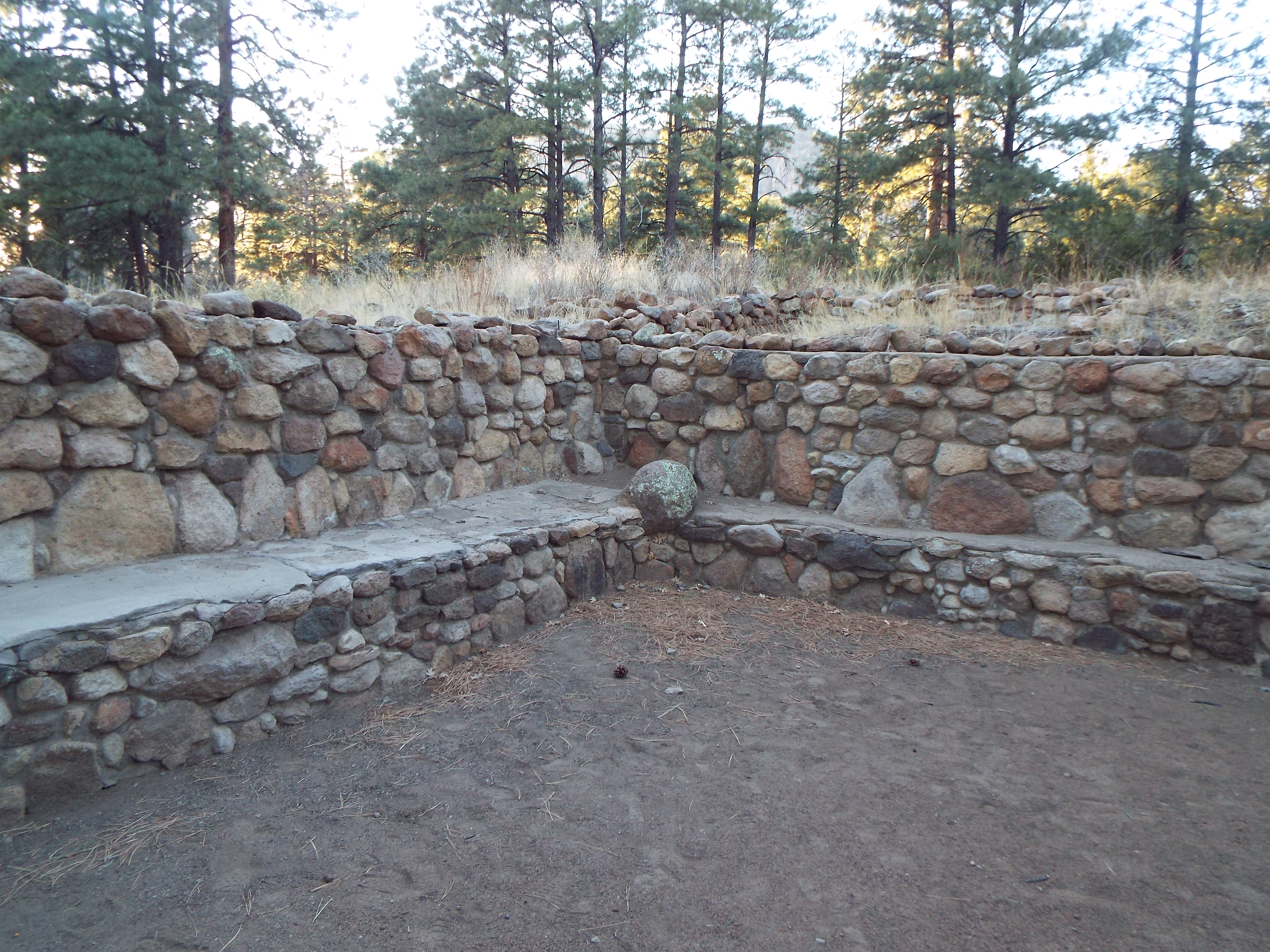
Community Room –

=== Flagstaff's Pioneer Museum ===
Flagstaff's Pioneer Museum, operated by the Arizona Historical Society, was established in 1963 and is located at 2340 North Fort Valley Road. The following are images of some of the outside exhibits of the museum. The building which houses the museum was built in 1908 with rocks from Mount Elden. The hospital, the "Coconino County Hospital" served the indigent until 1938.

- The Coconino County Hospital Building – built in 1908
- The Baldwin Locomotive #12 – built in 1929
- The Pioneer Barn – built in 1910
- The Emerson High School Bell – The school was established in 1886
Flagstaff's Pioneer Museum

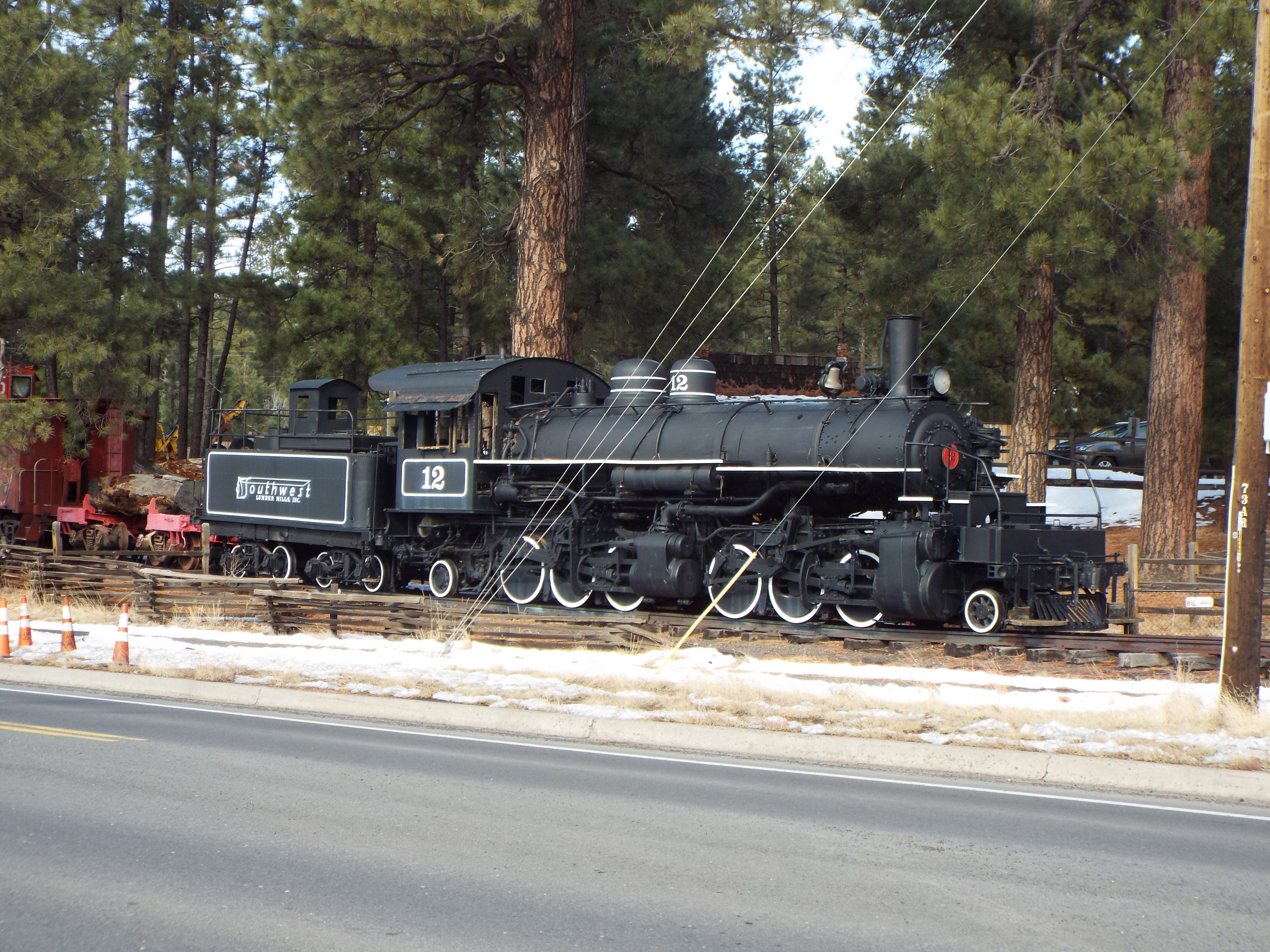
1929 Baldwin Locomotive#12

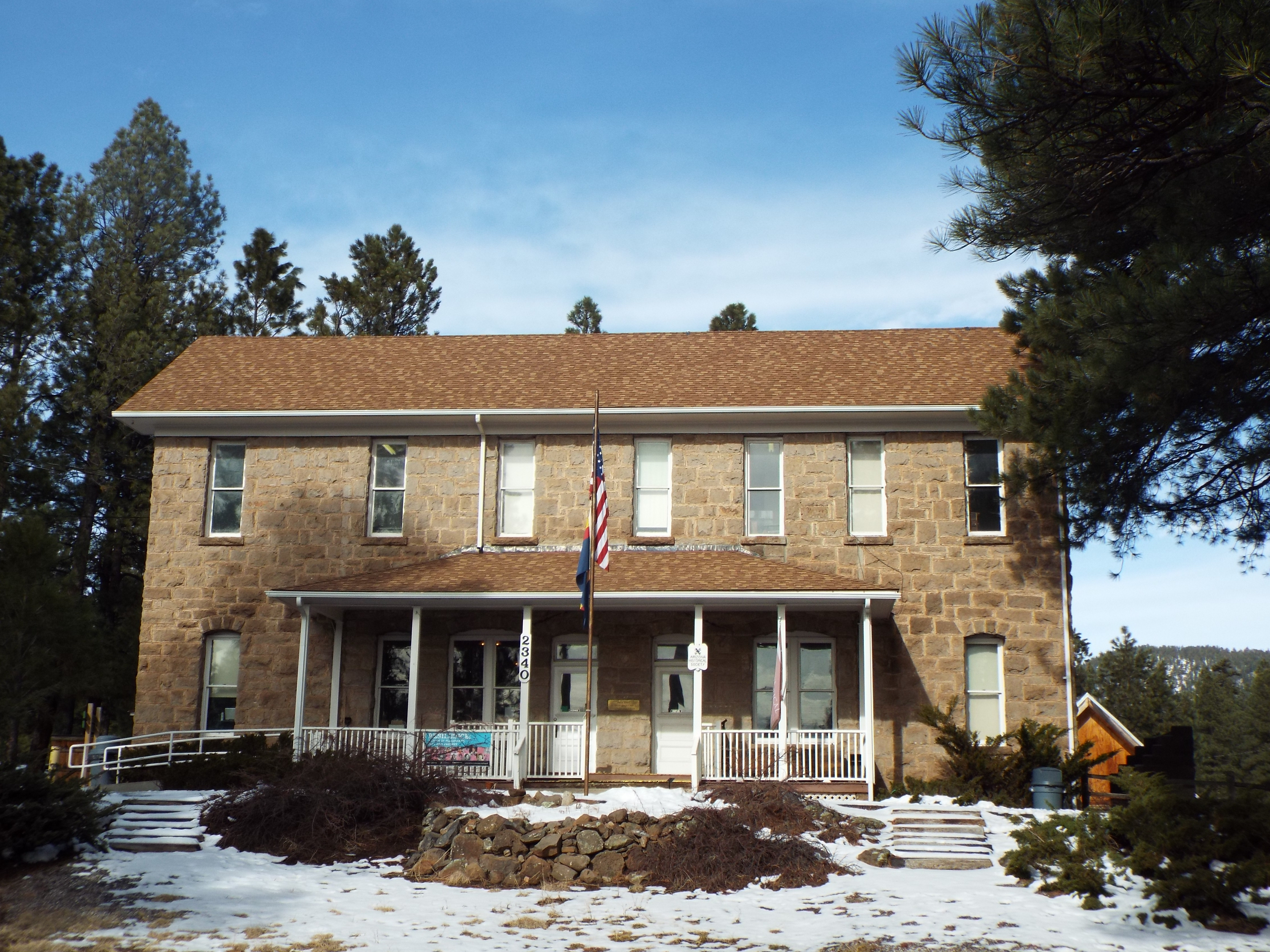
Coconino County Hospital Building – 1908

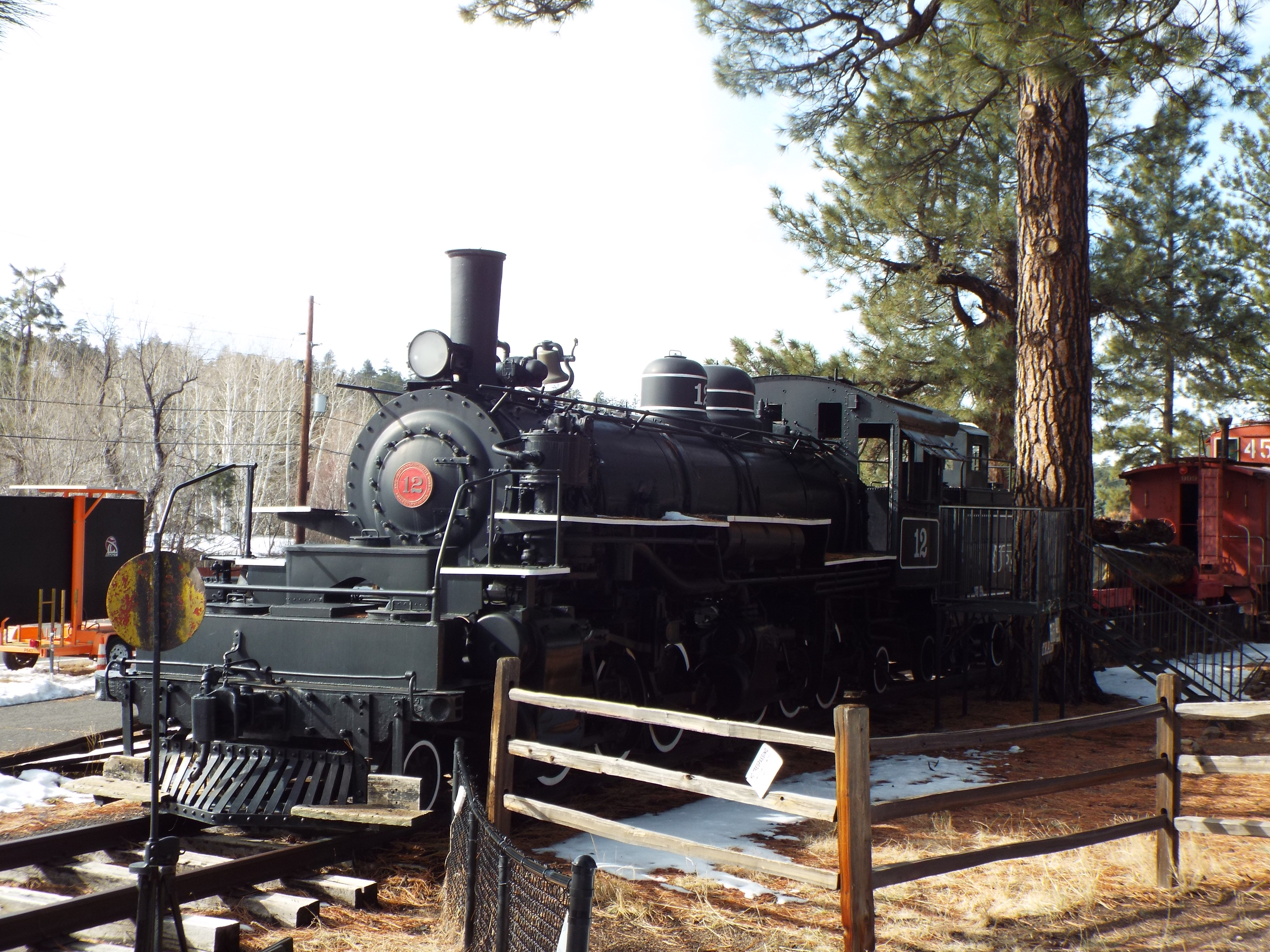
Baldwin Locomotive #12 – 1929

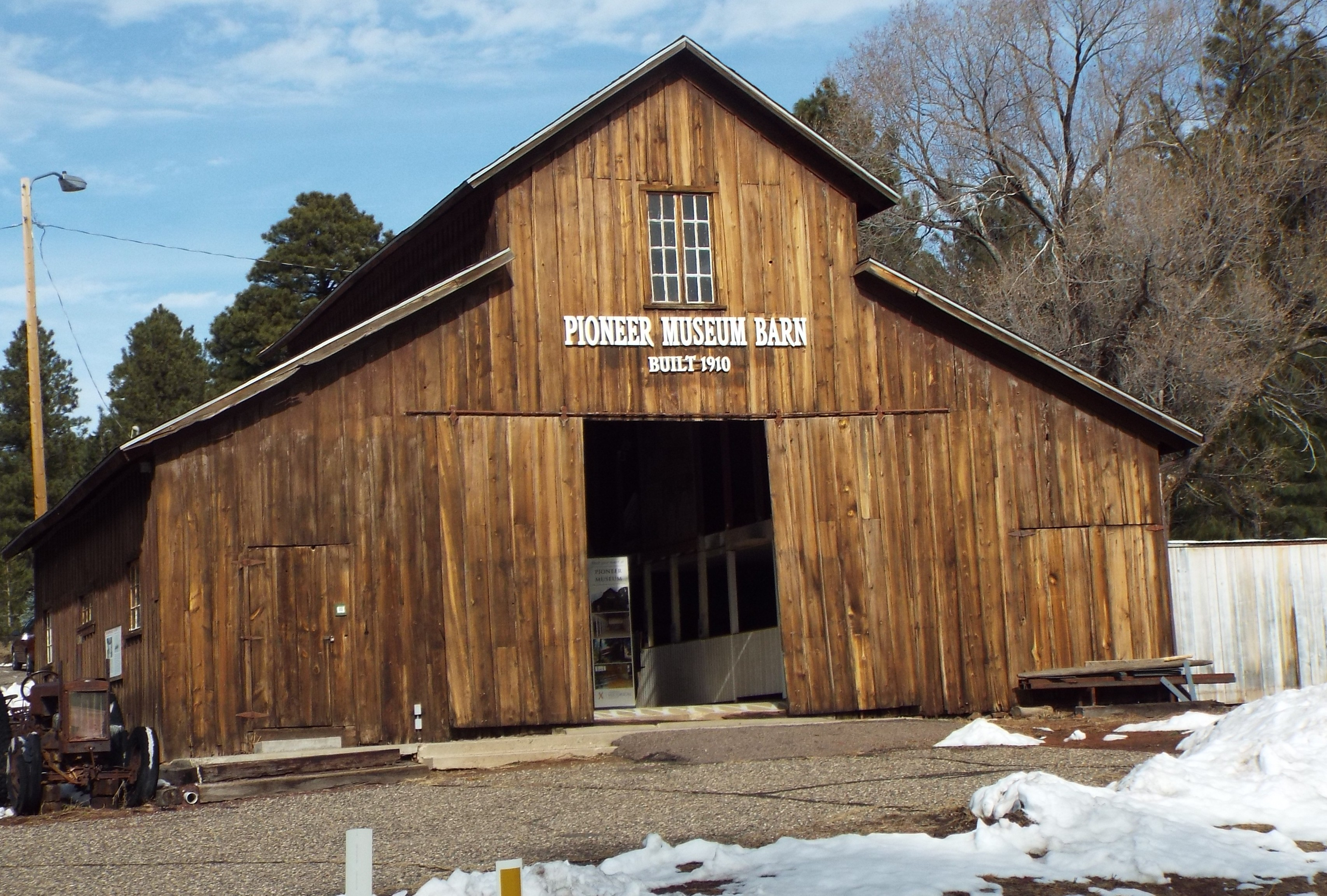
Pioneer Barn – 1910

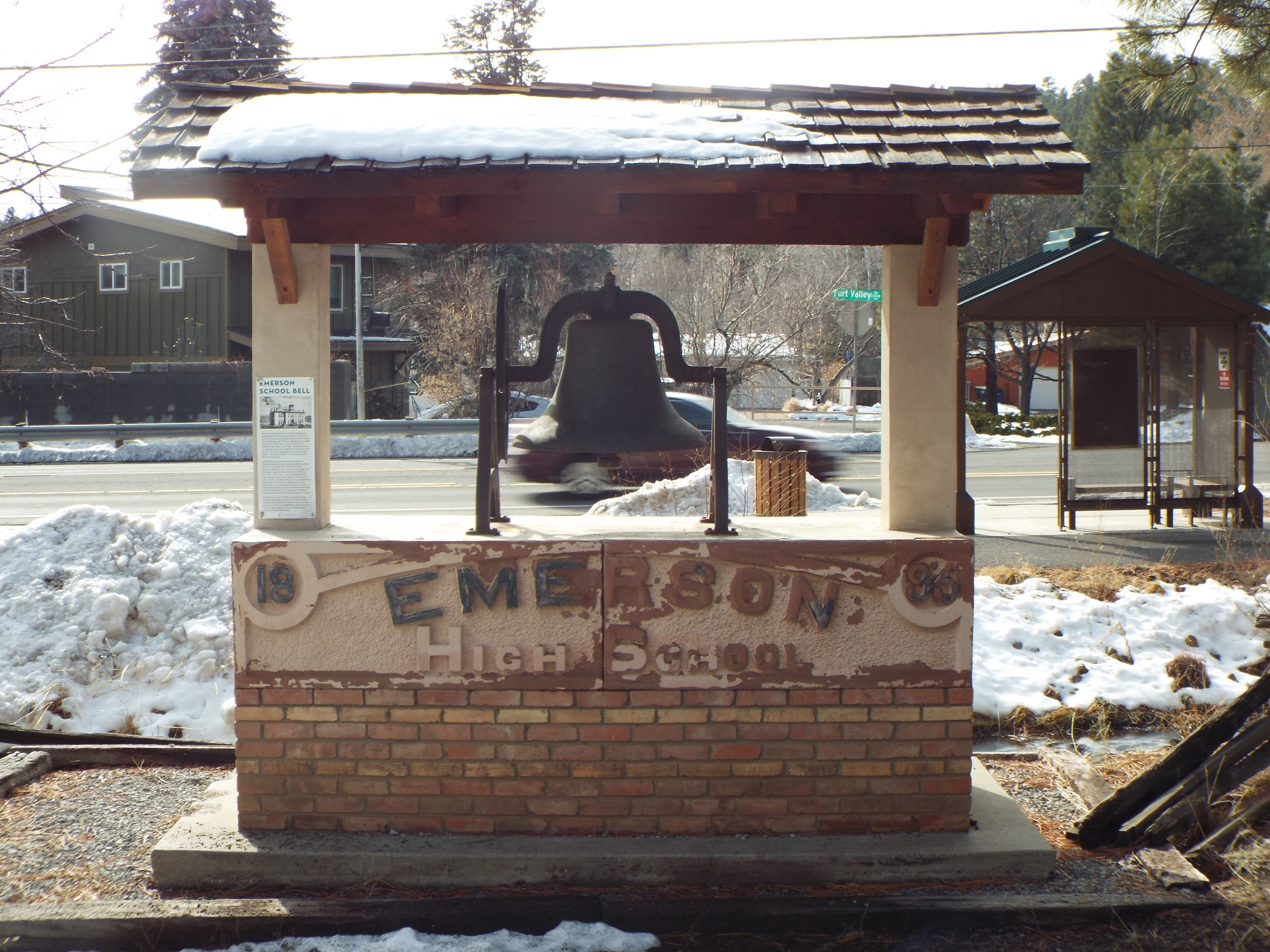
Emerson High School Bell – 1886

=== Historic National Monuments ===
Historic National Monuments
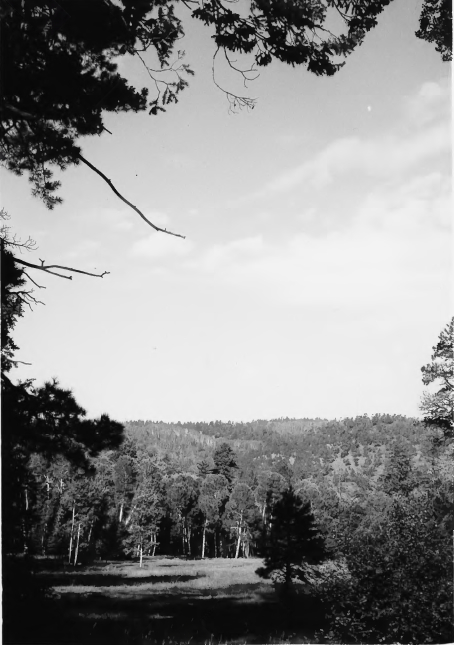
The C. Hart Merriam Base Camp Site is located on the northwest of Flagstaff in the Coconino National Forest

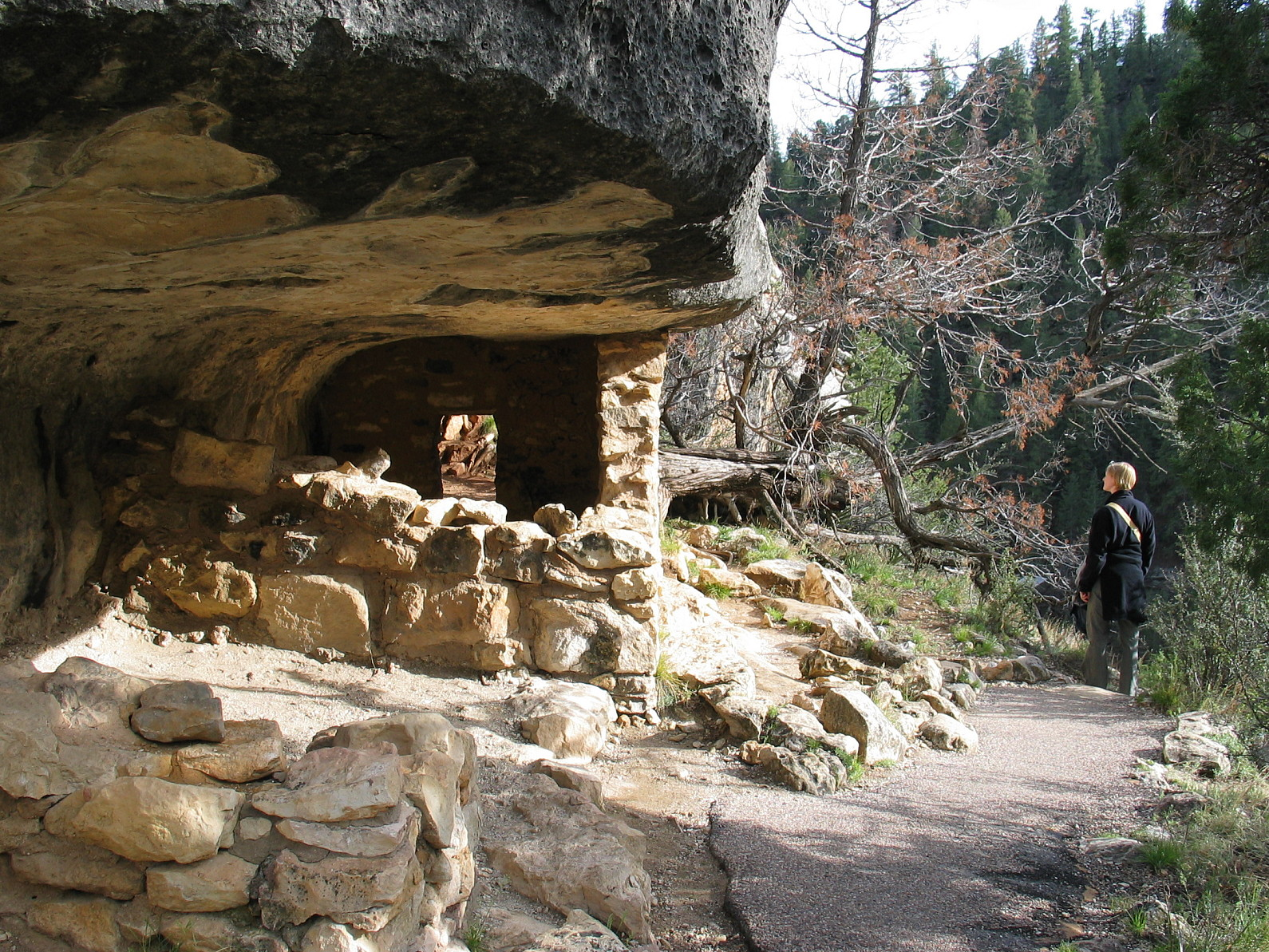
The Walnut Canyon National Monument is located east of Flagstaff off Old U.S. Route 66.

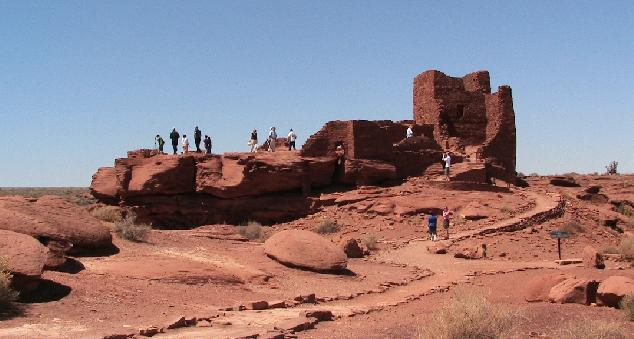
The Wupatki National Monument is located north of Flagstaff off U.S. Route 89

== See also ==
- National Register of Historic Places listings in Coconino County, Arizona
