= National Register of Historic Places listings in Coconino County, Arizona =

Location of Coconino County in Arizona

This is a list of the National Register of Historic Places listings in Coconino County, Arizona.

It is intended to be a complete list of the properties and districts on the National Register of Historic Places in Coconino County, Arizona, United States. The locations of National Register properties and districts for which the latitude and longitude coordinates are included below, may be seen in a map.

There are 155 properties and districts listed on the National Register in the county, including 11 that are also National Historic Landmarks. There are also two former listings.

This National Park Service list is complete through NPS recent listings posted April 24, 2026.

== Current listings ==
	Name on the Register	Image	Date listed	Location	City or town	Description
1	1956 Grand Canyon TWA – United Airlines Aviation Accident Site	1956 Grand Canyon TWA – United Airlines Aviation Accident Site	April 22, 2014 (#14000280)	Near the confluence of the Colorado River and Little Colorado River; 36°10′30″N 111°50′00″W	Grand Canyon National Park	
2	Abandoned Route 66, Ash Fork Hill		May 19, 1989 (#89000380)	North of Interstate 40 between Ash Fork and Williams; 35°13′10″N 112°21′39″W	Ash Fork	
3	Abandoned Route 66, Parks (1921)	Abandoned Route 66, Parks (1921)	May 19, 1989 (#89000377)	West of Parks, several feet north of current road alignment 35°15′36″N 111°57′19″W	Parks	
4	Abandoned Route 66, Parks (1931)	Abandoned Route 66, Parks (1931)	May 19, 1989 (#89000378)	East of Parks, following straight course through woods north of current, curved/bypass alignment 35°15′35″N 111°56′43″W	Parks	
5	Horace M. Albright Training Center	Horace M. Albright Training Center	September 13, 2013 (#13000784)	Albright Ave. & Center Rd. 35°58′41″N 111°59′26″W	Grand Canyon National Park	
6	Anderson Mesa Incline		February 24, 1995 (#95000154)	Address Restricted	Flagstaff	
7	Archeological Site No. AR-03-04-03-810		February 24, 1995 (#95000149)	Address Restricted	Flagstaff	
8	Archeological Site No. AR-03-04-03-811		February 24, 1995 (#95000150)	Address Restricted	Flagstaff	
9	Archeological Site No. AR-03-04-03-812		February 24, 1995 (#95000151)	Address Restricted	Flagstaff	
10	Archeological Site No. AR-03-04-05-414		February 24, 1995 (#95000152)	Address Restricted	Flagstaff	
11	Archeological Site. No. AR-03-04-05-440		February 24, 1995 (#95000153)	Address Restricted	Flagstaff	
12	Arizona Lumber and Timber Company Office	Arizona Lumber and Timber Company Office	April 30, 1986 (#86000900)	1 Riordan Rd. 35°11′29″N 111°40′00″W	Flagstaff	
13	Ash Fork Steel Dam	Ash Fork Steel Dam	July 30, 1976 (#76000373)	East of Ash Fork off Old U.S. Route 66; 35°13′31″N 112°24′54″W	Ash Fork	
14	Ashurst House	Ashurst House	November 29, 1984 (#84000529)	417-421 W. Aspen Ave. 35°11′59″N 111°39′12″W	Flagstaff	
15	Bank Hotel	Bank Hotel	December 7, 1977 (#77000232)	Route 66 and Leroux St. 35°11′52″N 111°38′57″W	Flagstaff	Also known as McMillan Building
16	Barney Flat Historic Railroad Logging Landscape	Barney Flat Historic Railroad Logging Landscape	February 24, 1995 (#95000155)	Perkinsville Rd., south of Williams in the Kaibab National Forest; 35°09′26″N 112°08′52″W	Williams	Only stump field in the NRHP
17	Big Springs Lookout Tower	Big Springs Lookout Tower	January 28, 1988 (#87002478)	Kaibab National Forest; 36°35′36″N 112°20′03″W	Big Springs	
18	Big Springs Ranger Station	Big Springs Ranger Station	June 10, 1993 (#93000519)	Along Ryan Rd. in the Kaibab National Forest; 36°36′12″N 112°20′59″W	Big Springs	
19	Brannen-Devine House	Brannen-Devine House	April 30, 1986 (#86000912)	209 E. Cottage; 35°11′41″N 111°38′51″W	Flagstaff	
20	Brow Monument	Brow Monument	July 13, 1987 (#87001159)	N. Kaibab Ranger District in the Kaibab National Forest; 36°35′27″N 112°23′54″W	Big Springs	
21	Buck Mountain Lookout Tower		January 28, 1988 (#87002460)	Coconino National Forest; 34°40′01″N 111°24′53″W	Buck Mountain	
22	Bullethead		November 21, 1992 (#92001544)	Address Restricted	Fredonia	
23	C&M Garage	C&M Garage	April 30, 1986 (#86000908)	204 S. Mikes Pike St. 35°11′44″N 111°39′15″W	Flagstaff	
24	Cameron Suspension Bridge	Cameron Suspension Bridge	June 5, 1986 (#86001206)	Carries U.S. Route 89 over the Little Colorado River; 35°52′38″N 111°24′40″W	Cameron	
25	Camp Clover Ranger Station	Camp Clover Ranger Station	July 16, 1993 (#93000520)	Off U.S. Route 89 southwest of Williams in the Kaibab National Forest; 35°14′13″N 112°13′08″W	Williams	
26	H.E. Campbell House	H.E. Campbell House	April 30, 1986 (#86000910)	215 N. Leroux; 35°12′00″N 111°38′54″W	Flagstaff	
27	Canyon Diablo Bridge	Canyon Diablo Bridge	September 30, 1988 (#88001664)	Abandoned grade of Old U.S. Route 66 over Diablo Canyon at Two Guns; 35°06′56″N 111°05′41″W	Two Guns	
28	Canyon Padre Bridge	Canyon Padre Bridge	September 30, 1988 (#88001666)	Abandoned grade of Old U.S. Route 66 over Padre Canyon; 35°09′44″N 111°17′12″W	Flagstaff	
29	Chapel of the Holy Cross	Chapel of the Holy Cross	October 6, 2011 (#10000947)	780 Chapel Rd. 34°49′55″N 111°46′00″W	Sedona	
30	Charles H. Spencer Hulk	Charles H. Spencer Hulk	October 15, 1989 (#89001593)	Address Restricted	Lee's Ferry	
31	Checkered Men		November 21, 1992 (#92001546)	Address Restricted	Fredonia	
32	J.M. Clark House	J.M. Clark House	December 5, 1984 (#84000446)	503 N. Humphreys St. 35°12′11″N 111°38′58″W	Flagstaff	
33	Cliffs Ranger Station	Cliffs Ranger Station	March 31, 1975 (#75000220)	2 miles (3.2 km) east of Flagstaff in Walnut Canyon National Monument; 35°10′30″N 111°31′02″W	Flagstaff	Renamed and boundary increased, August 28, 2019
34	Coconino County Hospital Complex	Coconino County Hospital Complex	April 30, 1986 (#86000905)	Ft. Valley Rd. 35°13′30″N 111°39′17″W	Flagstaff	Now the Pioneer Museum
35	Cooper Ridge Lookout Tree		January 13, 1992 (#91001962)	North of the junction of Alternate U.S. Route 89 and State Route 67 in the Kaibab National Forest; 36°44′48″N 112°13′05″W	Fredonia	
36	Corral Lake Lookout Tree		January 13, 1992 (#91001954)	Roughly 30 miles (48 km) southeast of Fredonia in the Kaibab National Forest; 36°36′18″N 112°15′58″W	Fredonia	
37	Coyote Range		May 14, 1984 (#84000641)	North of Flagstaff on U.S. Route 180; 35°13′52″N 111°39′20″W	Flagstaff	Perhaps better known as Colton House. Former home of Mary-Russell Ferrell Colton, part of the Museum of Northern Arizona
38	Dead Indian Canyon Bridge	Dead Indian Canyon Bridge	September 30, 1988 (#88001603)	Abandoned grade of US 64 [sic; actually State Route 64] over Dead Indian Canyon; 35°55′58″N 111°38′29″W	Desert View	Longest and last Warren truss bridge built in Arizona, in 1933, as part of opening the south rim of the Grand Canyon to the public.
39	DelSue Motor Inn	DelSue Motor Inn	May 4, 1998 (#98000356)	234 E. Old U.S. Route 66; 35°15′03″N 112°11′03″W	Williams	Now the "Grand Motel"
40	Desert View Watchtower Historic District	Desert View Watchtower Historic District	January 3, 1995 (#94001503)	East Rim Drive, about 17 miles (27 km) east of Grand Canyon Village, Desert View; 36°02′42″N 111°49′34″W	Grand Canyon National Park	
41	Dry Park Lookout Cabin and Storage Sheds	Dry Park Lookout Cabin and Storage Sheds	January 28, 1988 (#87002479)	Kaibab National Forest; 36°27′09″N 112°14′15″W	Big Springs	
42	El Tovar Hotel	El Tovar Hotel	September 6, 1974 (#74000334)	Grand Canyon National Park, Route 8A; 36°03′27″N 112°08′13″W	Grand Canyon National Park	
43	El Tovar Stables	El Tovar Stables	September 6, 1974 (#74000336)	Off Grand Canyon National Park Route 8A; 36°03′20″N 112°08′28″W	Grand Canyon National Park	
44	Elden Pueblo	Elden Pueblo	October 24, 1986 (#86002853)	U.S. Route 89, north of Flagstaff; 35°14′33″N 111°34′05″W	Flagstaff	
45	Dean Eldredge Museum	Dean Eldredge Museum	May 3, 1994 (#94000396)	3404 E. Route 66; 35°12′51″N 111°35′56″W	Flagstaff	Now the Museum Club, a roadhouse and dance club
46	Fern Mountain Ranch	Fern Mountain Ranch	March 29, 1978 (#78000542)	North of Flagstaff; 35°21′08″N 111°44′09″W	Flagstaff	
47	First Baptist Church	First Baptist Church	December 23, 1991 (#91001576)	123 S. Beaver St. 35°11′43″N 111°39′06″W	Flagstaff	
48	First Methodist Episcopal Church and Parsonage	First Methodist Episcopal Church and Parsonage	November 29, 1984 (#84000403)	127 W. Sherman St. 35°19′47″N 112°11′17″W	Williams	
49	Flagstaff Armory	Flagstaff Armory	April 30, 1986 (#86000903)	503 W. Clay Ave. 35°11′44″N 111°39′23″W	Flagstaff	Now the site of a Natural Grocers store
50	Flagstaff Southside Historic District	Flagstaff Southside Historic District	March 31, 2010 (#10000107)	South of downtown bordered by Route 66 and Santa Fe Railroad, Rio de Flag, and Northern Arizona University; 35°11′40″N 111°38′58″W	Flagstaff	
51	Flagstaff Townsite Historic Residential District	Flagstaff Townsite Historic Residential District	April 30, 1986 (#86000897)	Roughly bounded by Cherry, Humphreys and Sitgreaves Sts., Railroad Ave., and Toltec and Aztec Sts. 35°12′04″N 111°39′13″W	Flagstaff	
52	Fort Tuthill Historic District		April 6, 2004 (#04000257)	State Route 89A and Interstate 17; 35°08′31″N 111°41′25″W	Flagstaff	
53	Fracas Lookout Tree		January 13, 1992 (#91001955)	Roughly 30 miles (48 km) southeast of Fredonia in the Kaibab National Forest; 36°39′39″N 112°16′16″W	Fredonia	
54	D.M. Francis House		April 30, 1986 (#86000902)	1456 Meade Ln. 35°13′06″N 111°39′32″W	Flagstaff	
55	Grand Canyon Airport Historic District	Grand Canyon Airport Historic District	August 28, 2007 (#07000278)	Approximately 2.6 miles (4.2 km) east of the junction of State Route 64 and Forest Rd. 305; 35°50′54″N 112°05′24″W	Tusayan	
56	Grand Canyon Inn and Campground	Grand Canyon Inn and Campground	September 2, 1982 (#82001872)	North Rim; 36°12′34″N 112°03′35″W	Grand Canyon National Park	
57	Grand Canyon Lodge	Grand Canyon Lodge	September 2, 1982 (#82001721)	North Rim on Bright Angel Point; 36°11′57″N 112°03′07″W	Grand Canyon National Park	Severely damaged by wildfire July 13, 2025.
58	Grand Canyon North Rim Headquarters	Grand Canyon North Rim Headquarters	September 2, 1982 (#82001722)	North Rim; 36°12′53″N 112°03′42″W	Grand Canyon National Park	
59	Grand Canyon Park Operations Building	Grand Canyon Park Operations Building	May 28, 1987 (#87001412)	Off West Rim Dr. 36°03′18″N 112°08′13″W	Grand Canyon National Park	
60	Grand Canyon Power House	Grand Canyon Power House	May 28, 1987 (#87001411)	Off West Rim Dr. 36°03′31″N 112°08′26″W	Grand Canyon National Park	
61	Grand Canyon Railroad Station	Grand Canyon Railroad Station	September 6, 1974 (#74000337)	Grand Canyon National Park Route 8A; 36°03′22″N 112°08′11″W	Grand Canyon National Park	
62	Grand Canyon Railway	Grand Canyon Railway	August 23, 2000 (#00000319)	From Williams to Grand Canyon National Park; 35°35′59″N 112°12′44″W	Williams	
63	Grand Canyon Village Historic District	Grand Canyon Village Historic District	November 20, 1975 (#75000343)	State Route 64; 36°03′22″N 112°08′21″W	Grand Canyon National Park	
64	Grandview Lookout Tower and Cabin	Grandview Lookout Tower and Cabin	January 28, 1988 (#87002482)	Off Coconino Rim Rd. 35°57′28″N 111°57′15″W	Twin Lakes	
65	Grandview Lookout Tree		January 13, 1992 (#91001945)	South of Grandview Point, Grand Canyon National Park, in the Kaibab National Forest; 35°55′58″N 111°58′44″W	Grand Canyon National Park	
66	Grandview Mine	Grandview Mine	July 9, 1974 (#74000347)	Grand Canyon National Park; 36°01′05″N 111°58′32″W	Grand Canyon National Park	
67	Hart Store	Hart Store	October 25, 2007 (#07001099)	100 Brewer Rd. 34°51′52″N 111°45′55″W	Sedona	
68	Head Hunters		November 21, 1992 (#92001548)	Address Restricted	Fredonia	
69	Hermits Rest Concession Building	Hermits Rest Concession Building	August 7, 1974 (#74000335)	Grand Canyon National Park; 36°03′40″N 112°12′40″W	Grand Canyon National Park	
70	The Homestead	The Homestead	May 27, 1975 (#75000341)	3 miles (4.8 km) north of Flagstaff on U.S. Route 180; 35°14′05″N 111°39′48″W	Flagstaff	Oldest home in Flagstaff, home of Thomas McMillan. Part of the Museum of Northern Arizona
71	House at 310 South Beaver	House at 310 South Beaver	April 30, 1986 (#86000913)	310 S. Beaver; 35°11′37″N 111°39′03″W	Flagstaff	
72	House at 720 Grand Canyon Avenue		April 30, 1986 (#86000909)	720 Grand Canyon Ave. 35°11′58″N 111°39′26″W	Flagstaff	
73	Hull Cabin Historic District	Hull Cabin Historic District	October 23, 1985 (#85003370)	1.5 miles (2.4 km) south of Grand Canyon South Rim in the Kaibab National Forest; 35°58′05″N 111°56′46″W	Grand Canyon National Park	
74	Hull Tank Lookout Tree	Hull Tank Lookout Tree	January 13, 1992 (#91001947)	Southeast of Grandview Point, Grand Canyon National Park, in the Kaibab National Forest; 35°56′25″N 111°57′28″W	Grand Canyon National Park	
75	The Ice House	The Ice House	April 8, 2009 (#09000174)	201 East Birch Avenue; 35°11′54″N 111°38′44″W	Flagstaff	
76	Jacob Lake Lookout Tower	Jacob Lake Lookout Tower	January 28, 1988 (#87002477)	Grand Canyon Highway; 36°41′59″N 112°12′47″W	Jacob Lake	
77	Jacob Lake Ranger Station	Jacob Lake Ranger Station	July 13, 1987 (#87001151)	N. Kaibab Ranger District off State Route 67 in the Kaibab National Forest; 36°42′23″N 112°13′43″W	Jacob Lake	Historic cabin and barn
78	Jordan Ranch	Jordan Ranch	January 28, 2004 (#03001489)	735 Jordan Rd. 34°52′42″N 111°45′40″W	Sedona	Jordan Farmhouse
79	Kane Ranch Headquarters		January 2, 2008 (#07001348)	Approximately 11 miles (18 km) south of U.S. Route 89A on Forest Rd. 8910; 36°34′05″N 112°00′14″W	House Rock Valley	
80	Kendrick Lookout Cabin	Kendrick Lookout Cabin	January 28, 1988 (#87002480)	Kaibab National Forest; 35°24′30″N 111°50′46″W	Pumpkin Center	Built in 1911
81	I.B. Koch House		April 30, 1986 (#86000901)	7 Riordan Rd. 35°11′27″N 111°39′56″W	Flagstaff	
82	Krenz-Kerley Trading Post		August 24, 1998 (#98001040)	78 N. Main St. 36°07′53″N 111°14′21″W	Tuba City	Now the Tuba City Public Library
83	La Ciudad de Mexico Grocery	La Ciudad de Mexico Grocery	April 30, 1986 (#86000906)	217 S. San Francisco; 35°11′38″N 111°38′59″W	Flagstaff	
84	La Iglesia Metodista Mexicana, El Divino Redentor	La Iglesia Metodista Mexicana, El Divino Redentor	January 30, 1985 (#85000147)	319 S. San Francisco St. 35°11′34″N 111°39′01″W	Flagstaff	
85	Laws Spring	Laws Spring	July 5, 1984 (#84000645)	Kaibab National Forest; 35°25′36″N 112°04′07″W	Williams	
86	Lee Butte Lookout Tower and Cabin		January 28, 1988 (#87002461)	Woods Canyon; 34°50′04″N 111°32′10″W	Happy Jack	
87	Lee's Ferry and Lonely Dell Ranch	Lee's Ferry and Lonely Dell Ranch	November 4, 1997 (#97001234)	Confluence of Colorado and Paria Rivers, near the Utah-Arizona border 36°51′53″N 111°35′40″W	Marble Canyon	
88	Lees Ferry	Lees Ferry	March 15, 1976 (#76000374)	Southwest of Page at the Colorado River; 36°52′02″N 111°34′53″W	Page	
89	Little Mountain Lookout Tree		January 13, 1992 (#91001950)	Roughly 30 miles (48 km) southeast of Fredonia in the Kaibab National Forest; 36°35′22″N 112°21′30″W	Fredonia	
90	Lonely Dell Ranch Historic District	Lonely Dell Ranch Historic District	May 19, 1978 (#78000277)	Southwest of Page in the Glen Canyon National Recreation Area; 36°52′15″N 111°35′41″W	Page	
91	Lowell Observatory	Lowell Observatory	October 15, 1966 (#66000172)	1 mile (1.6 km) west of Flagstaff on Mars Hill; 35°12′08″N 111°39′46″W	Flagstaff	
92	Mary Jane Colter Buildings (Hopi House, The Lookout, Hermit's Rest, and the Desert View Watchtower)	Mary Jane Colter Buildings (Hopi House, The Lookout, Hermit's Rest, and the Desert View Watchtower)	May 28, 1987 (#87001436)	Several locations along the South Rim; 36°03′15″N 112°03′18″W	Grand Canyon National Park	The Hopi House built in 1904
93	C. Hart Merriam Base Camp Site	C. Hart Merriam Base Camp Site	October 15, 1966 (#66000173)	20 miles (32 km) northwest of Flagstaff in the Coconino National Forest; 35°22′30″N 111°43′30″W	Flagstaff	
94	W.W. Midgley Bridge	W.W. Midgley Bridge	March 31, 1989 (#88001614)	Milepost 375.7 on Alternate U.S. Route 89 over Wilson Canyon; 34°53′07″N 111°44′30″W	Sedona	
95	Milligan House	Milligan House	November 29, 1984 (#84000389)	323 W. Aspen; 35°11′59″N 111°39′11″W	Flagstaff	
96	Moqui Lookout Cabin	Moqui Lookout Cabin	January 28, 1988 (#87002457)	Coconino National Forest; 34°33′52″N 111°09′57″W	Blue Ridge	
97	Moqui Ranger Station	Moqui Ranger Station	June 10, 1993 (#93000521)	Off U.S. Route 180 north of Tusayan in the Kaibab National Forest; 35°59′17″N 112°07′13″W	Tusayan	
98	Museum of Northern Arizona Exhibition Building	Museum of Northern Arizona Exhibition Building	April 27, 1993 (#93000305)	3001 N. Fort Valley Rd. 35°14′04″N 111°39′53″W	Flagstaff	
99	Navajo National Monument	Navajo National Monument	October 15, 1966 (#66000176)	30 miles (48 km) southwest of Kayenta; 36°41′07″N 110°32′07″W	Kayenta	
100	Navajo Steel Arch Highway Bridge	Navajo Steel Arch Highway Bridge	August 13, 1981 (#81000134)	Southwest of Lee; 36°49′05″N 111°37′52″W	Lee's Ferry	
101	Negrette House	Negrette House	October 8, 2014 (#14000823)	120 S. 6th St. 35°14′54″N 112°11′33″W	Williams	
102	North End Historic Residential District		April 30, 1986 (#86000899)	Roughly bounded by Hunt, San Francisco and Verde, Elm and Cherry, and Beaver and Humphreys Sts. 35°12′06″N 111°39′04″W	Flagstaff	Flagstaff MRA
103	Northern Arizona Normal School Historic District	Northern Arizona Normal School Historic District	May 22, 1986 (#86001107)	Northern Arizona University campus, near Route 66 (Milton Rd.); 35°11′35″N 111°39′18″W	Flagstaff	Old Main and other historic buildings
104	Nuvakwewtaqa		August 2, 1977 (#77000233)	Address Restricted	Winslow	
105	Buckey O'Neill Cabin	Buckey O'Neill Cabin	October 29, 1975 (#75000227)	Off State Route 64 in Grand Canyon National Park; 36°03′26″N 112°08′26″W	Grand Canyon National Park	
106	Our Lady of Guadalupe Church	Our Lady of Guadalupe Church	April 30, 1986 (#86000907)	302 S. Kendrick; 35°11′44″N 111°39′10″W	Flagstaff	
107	Pendley Homestead Historic District	Pendley Homestead Historic District	December 23, 1991 (#91001857)	State Route 89A, 7 miles (11 km) north of Sedona; 34°56′54″N 111°45′10″W	Sedona	Within Slide Rock State Park
108	Picture Canyon Archaeological Site	Picture Canyon Archaeological Site	January 10, 2008 (#07001349)	Address Restricted	Flagstaff	
109	Presbyterian Church Parsonage	Presbyterian Church Parsonage	April 30, 1986 (#86000911)	15 E. Cherry; 35°12′00″N 111°38′50″W	Flagstaff	
110	Prochnow House	Prochnow House	April 30, 1986 (#86000898)	304 S. Elden; 35°11′32″N 111°38′42″W	Flagstaff	
111	Promontory Butte Lookout Complex	Promontory Butte Lookout Complex	January 28, 1988 (#87002455)	Rim Rd. in the Apache-Sitgreaves National Forest; 34°22′03″N 111°00′43″W	Beaver Park	
112	Pumphouse Wash Bridge	Pumphouse Wash Bridge	September 30, 1988 (#88001605)	Milepost 387.4 on U.S. Route 89 over Pumphouse Wash; 35°01′30″N 111°44′06″W	Flagstaff	
113	Railroad Addition Historic District	Railroad Addition Historic District	January 18, 1983 (#83002989)	15 W. Aspen; also roughly bounded by Santa Fe railroad tracks, Agassiz and Beaver Sts., Birch and Aspen Aves.; also 122 E. Old U.S. Route 66; 35°11′52″N 111°38′50″W	Flagstaff	Additional addresses represent two boundary increases
114	Ranger's Dormitory	Ranger's Dormitory	September 5, 1975 (#75000219)	Off State Route 64 in Grand Canyon National Park; 36°03′20″N 112°08′11″W	Grand Canyon National Park	
115	Ridge Ruin Archeological District		April 20, 1992 (#92000339)	Address Restricted	Flagstaff	
116	Riordan Estate	Riordan Estate	February 28, 1979 (#79000416)	2 Kinlichi Knoll; 35°11′14″N 111°39′33″W	Flagstaff	
117	Rock Family		November 21, 1992 (#92001550)	Address Restricted	Fredonia	
118	Rocketeers		November 21, 1992 (#92001547)	Address Restricted	Fredonia	
119	Rural Route 66, Brannigan Park		May 19, 1989 (#89000375)	Forest Rd. 146 east of Parks to Brannigan Park; 35°15′46″N 111°53′40″W	Parks	
120	Rural Route 66, Parks		May 19, 1989 (#89000374)	Forest Rd. 146 between Beacon Hill and Parks; 35°15′50″N 112°02′45″W	Parks	
121	Rural Route 66, Pine Springs		May 19, 1989 (#89000379)	Forest Rd. 108 at Pine Springs Ranch; 35°12′55″N 112°16′42″W	Williams	
122	Saginaw & Manistee Camp 2		February 24, 1995 (#95000148)	Address Restricted	Flagstaff	
123	Sedona Ranger Station	Sedona Ranger Station	August 29, 2008 (#08000810)	Brewer Road, south of Hart Road; 34°51′45″N 111°45′57″W	Sedona	
124	South Beaver School	South Beaver School	August 6, 1987 (#87001342)	506 S. Beaver St. 35°11′30″N 111°39′06″W	Flagstaff	
125	Sunset Crater-Cinder Lake Apollo Mission Testing and Training Historic District	Sunset Crater-Cinder Lake Apollo Mission Testing and Training Historic District	November 8, 2019 (#100004595)	Roughly bounded by Sunset Crater Volcano National Monument and Sunset Crater West Quadrangle; 35°22′09″N 111°31′04″W	Flagstaff	
126	Summit Mountain Lookout Tree		January 13, 1992 (#91001948)	Off Perkinsville Rd. southeast of Williams in the Kaibab National Forest; 35°07′51″N 112°07′56″W	Williams	
127	Superintendent's Residence	Superintendent's Residence	September 6, 1974 (#74000450)	Off Route 8A in Grand Canyon National Park; 36°03′22″N 112°08′05″W	Grand Canyon National Park	
128	Tater Point Lookout Tree		January 13, 1992 (#91001946)	Forest Rd. 240 east of State Route 67 and south of U.S. Route 89A in the Kaibab National Forest; 36°32′22″N 112°06′05″W	Fredonia	
129	Taylor Cabin Line Camp		July 16, 1985 (#85001580)	Sycamore Canyon Wilderness Area; 34°59′18″N 111°59′19″W	Sedona	
130	Telephone Hill Lookout Tree		January 13, 1992 (#91001952)	Off State Route 67 south of its junction with U.S. Route 89A in the Kaibab National Forest; 36°32′50″N 112°10′33″W	Fredonia	
131	Tipover Lookout Tree		January 13, 1992 (#91001953)	Northwest of North Rim Entrance Station, Grand Canyon National Park, in the Kaibab National Forest; 36°21′56″N 112°08′19″W	Fredonia	
132	Trans-Canyon Telephone Line, Grand Canyon National Park	Trans-Canyon Telephone Line, Grand Canyon National Park	May 13, 1986 (#86001102)	Grand Canyon along the Bright Angel and North Kaibab Trails from the South Rim to Roaring Springs and the South Kaibab Trail to Tipoff; 36°06′36″N 112°05′34″W	Grand Canyon National Park	
133	Tuba Trading Post	Tuba Trading Post	November 29, 1996 (#96001362)	10 N. Main St. 36°07′49″N 111°14′25″W	Tuba City	Native limestone trading post building complex, built in 1891, 1905, and later.
134	Tusayan Lookout Tree	Tusayan Lookout Tree	January 13, 1992 (#91001951)	West of U.S. Route 180, southwest of Tusayan in the Kaibab National Forest; 35°58′16″N 112°08′11″W	Tusayan	
135	Tusayan Ruins	Tusayan Ruins	July 10, 1974 (#74000285)	Grand Canyon National Park; 36°00′49″N 111°51′56″W	Grand Canyon National Park	
136	Tutuveni		December 3, 1986 (#86003283)	Address Restricted	Cameron	
137	Twins		November 21, 1992 (#92001545)	Address Restricted	Fredonia	
138	Two Spot Logging Train	Two Spot Logging Train	September 14, 1999 (#99001066)	Junction of San Francisco St. and BNSF Railroad; 35°11′48″N 111°38′46″W	Flagstaff	
139	Urban Route 66, Williams	Urban Route 66, Williams	May 19, 1989 (#89000376)	Bill Williams Ave. between 6th St. and Pine St. 35°14′56″N 112°11′31″W	Williams	
140	USFS Fort Valley Experimental Forest Station Historic District		July 25, 2001 (#01000002)	1/3 mile (0.54 km) west of the junction of U.S. Route 180 and Bader Rd. 35°16′04″N 111°44′34″W	Flagstaff	
141	Volunteer Lookout Cabin		January 28, 1988 (#87002481)	Kaibab National Forest; 35°13′05″N 111°53′41″W	Bellemont	
142	Walnut Canyon Bridge	Walnut Canyon Bridge	September 30, 1988 (#88001660)	Townsend-Winona Highway; 35°12′42″N 111°25′14″W	Winona	
143	Walnut Canyon Dam	Walnut Canyon Dam	January 18, 1979 (#79000417)	Southeast of Flagstaff; 35°09′59″N 111°28′30″W	Flagstaff	
144	Walnut Canyon National Monument	Walnut Canyon National Monument	October 15, 1966 (#66000174)	8 miles (13 km) east of Flagstaff off Old U.S. Route 66; 35°09′51″N 111°30′03″W	Flagstaff	
145	Water Reclamation Plant	Water Reclamation Plant	September 6, 1974 (#74000348)	South of Grand Canyon National Park, Route 8A; 36°02′54″N 112°09′19″W	Grand Canyon National Park	
146	Weatherford Hotel	Weatherford Hotel	March 30, 1978 (#78000543)	23 N. Leroux St. 35°11′54″N 111°38′53″W	Flagstaff	
147	White Man Cave		November 21, 1992 (#92001543)	Address Restricted	Fredonia	
148	Williams Historic Business District	Williams Historic Business District	December 20, 1984 (#84000436)	Roughly bounded by Grant and Railroad Aves. and 1st and 4th Sts. 35°15′03″N 112°11′20″W	Williams	
149	Williams Residential Historic District	Williams Residential Historic District	January 8, 1998 (#97001603)	Roughly bounded by Grant and Fairview Aves. and Taber and 6th Sts. 35°14′47″N 112°11′12″W	Williams	
150	Willow Springs		December 3, 1986 (#86003285)	Address Restricted	Cameron	
151	Charles Wilson, Jr. House	Charles Wilson, Jr. House	April 30, 1986 (#86000904)	100 Wilson Dr. 35°12′01″N 111°39′41″W	Flagstaff	
152	Winona		October 15, 1966 (#66000177)	Address Restricted	Winona	Archaeological site.
153	Wise Men		November 21, 1992 (#92001549)	Address Restricted	Fredonia	
154	Woody Mountain Lookout Tower	Woody Mountain Lookout Tower	January 28, 1988 (#87002458)	Rogers Lake; 35°08′32″N 111°44′57″W	Flagstaff	
155	Wupatki National Monument	Wupatki National Monument	October 15, 1966 (#66000175)	30 miles (48 km) north of Flagstaff off U.S. Route 89; 35°33′01″N 111°23′02″W	Flagstaff	

== Former listings ==
	Name on the Register	Image	Date listed	Date removed	Location	City or town	Description
1	Mayhew's Lodge		February 13, 1975 (#75000346)	October 31, 1980	10.5 mi. N of Sedona on U.S. 89A	Flagstaff	Destroyed by fire March 26, 1980
2	Mormon Lake Lookout Cabin		January 28, 1988 (#87002459)	July 8, 2019	Coconino National Forest; 34°53′12″N 111°25′42″W	Mormon Lake	

== See also ==
- List of National Historic Landmarks in Arizona
- National Register of Historic Places listings in Arizona
