= Camp Merriam =

Camp Merriam may be:

- Camp Merriam (San Luis Obispo)
- Camp Merriam (San Francisco)
- C. Hart Merriam Base Camp Site
