= The Ice House =

The Ice House may refer to:

- The Ice House (novel), a 1992 novel by Minette Walters
- The Ice House (comedy club), a California comedy club
- The Ice House (1978 film), a BBC drama featured as A Ghost Story for Christmas
- The Ice House (1969 film), an American trash/horror/thriller film
- The Ice House (Flagstaff, Arizona), a 1946 ice house in Flagstaff, Arizona
- The Ice House (St. Petersburg), an ice house built in 1740 in Russia

== See also ==
- Icehouse (disambiguation)
