= Icehouse =

Icehouse or ice house may refer to:

- Ice house (building), a building where ice is stored
- Ice shanty, a shelter for ice fishing also known as an Icehouse
- Ice rink, a facility for ice skating.
- Ice hockey arena, an area where ice hockey is played, often professionally.

Places

- The Ice House (comedy club), a folk music- turned comedy-club in Pasadena, California
- The Ice House, Great Yarmouth, a Grade II listed building in Norfolk, England
- Ice House (Moulton, Alabama), listed on the National Register of Historic Places
- Tugnet Ice House, a category A listed building in Scotland, the largest of its kind remaining in the UK
- The Icehouse (business growth centre), a business growth centre in New Zealand
- London Ice House, an arena in London, Ontario, Canada
- Medibank Icehouse (Winter Olympic Institute of Australia), Australia's only dual ice skating and ice sports venue
- Vivekanandar Illam, a palace at Chennai, India, also known as Ice House

Music

- Icehouse (band), an Australian rock band from 1981, formerly known as Flowers (1977-1981)
  - Icehouse (album), the 1980 debut Australian rock album by band Flowers, later called Icehouse
    - "Icehouse (song)", the title track, released as a single in 1981 by Icehouse

Film

- Ice House (film), a 1989 film starring Melissa Gilbert and Bo Brinkman

Other

- Icehouse (beer), a brand of American beer
- Icehouse pieces, nestable and stackable pyramid-shaped pieces with which the abstract strategy game Icehouse and many other games are played
- Icehouse Earth, a climate state describing glaciated periods of Earth history

== See also ==
- The Ice House (disambiguation)
