= Clinton Hart Merriam =

American zoologist and ornithologist

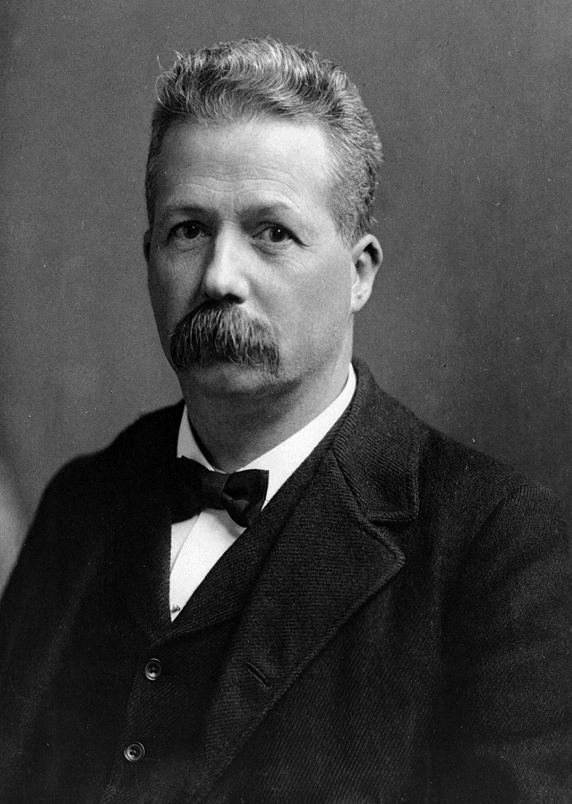
- Hart Merriam, c. 1901
- Born: December 5, 1855; New York City, U.S.
- Died: March 19, 1942 (aged 86); Berkeley, California, U.S.
- Education: Yale University; Columbia University
- Known for: Life zone concept
- Relatives: Clinton L. Merriam (father); Florence Merriam Bailey (sister); Vernon Orlando Bailey (brother-in-law)
- Scientific career
- Fields: Zoology; Ornithology; Mammalogy; Ethnography; Anthropology
- Workplaces: Academy of Sciences; US Biological Survey; United States Department of Agriculture; National Geographic Society; Biological Society of Washington; American Ornithologists' Union; US Board of Geographic Names; American Society of Mammalogists; Anthropological Society of Washington; American Society of Naturalists
- Author abbrev. (botany): Merriam

Clinton Hart Merriam (December 5, 1855 – March 19, 1942) was an American zoologist, mammalogist, ornithologist, entomologist, ecologist, ethnographer, geographer, naturalist and physician. He was commonly known as the "father of mammalogy," a branch of zoology referring to the study of mammals.

== Early life ==
Clinton Hart Merriam was born in New York City in 1855 to Clinton Levi Merriam, a U.S. congressman, and Caroline Hart, a judge's daughter and a graduate of Rutgers Institute. The name Clinton, shared by both father and son, was in honor of New York governor DeWitt Clinton, whom the Merriam family had connections with. To avoid confusion, the younger Merriam went by his first initial combined with his middle name, his mother's maiden name, and thus often appears as C. Hart Merriam in both the literature of his time and thereafter.

Although born in New York City, where his parents were staying the winter, the family home and place where Merriam spent his boyhood days was "Locust Grove," a homestead in Lewis County, New York. It was located near the Adirondack Mountains, where Merriam's interests in the natural world flourished. Encouraged by his father, who gave the young Merriam a muzzle-loading rifle and an old storeroom to keep his trophies, Merriam began a collection of natural specimens at a young age, learning the basics of taxidermy from a retired army surgeon. At the age of fifteen, Merriam's father took him to see naturalist Spencer F. Baird at the Smithsonian Institution, who was impressed with the boy's collection. Professor Baird would have a lasting impact on Merriam's career as a naturalist, and he supported Merriam's entrance into the scientific community by setting up lessons with the taxidermist John Wallace, recommending Merriam to the Hayden Geological Survey, and providing assistance in Merriam's first publication following the expedition.

=== 1872 Hayden Expedition ===
Through the recommendation of Professor Baird, the 16-year-old Merriam was appointed as naturalist of the Hayden Geological Survey of 1872. In June 1872 Congress had appropriated another $20,000 for completion of the notable Hayden Geological Survey of 1871. It had contributed to the founding of Yellowstone National Park. Both were part of the United States Geological and Geographical Survey of the Territories (1871–1877). Beginning in Ogden and the Wasatch Mountains of Utah, the expedition pushed between the Teton Basin and up through Idaho, Wyoming, and Montana and into the newly established Yellowstone National Park.

Merriam returned from the expedition with 313 bird skins and 67 nests with eggs. His report from the trip appears in the Sixth Annual Report of the U.S. Geological Survey of the Territories and marks his first major contribution to the zoological literature. Following the expedition, Lt. George Wheeler, a rival of Hayden's in surveying the American West, tried to poach Merriam for his own survey, putting Merriam in the midst of an old feud between the two explorers. A third expedition, without Merriam, explored Colorado in 1873. Again Professor Baird stepped in on behalf of Merriam, resolving the issue by recommending that Merriam return to school to prepare for college.

=== Education ===
Merriam followed Professor Baird's advice and prepared for college in 1872 and 1873 by attending Pingry Military School in Elizabeth, New Jersey, and Williston Seminary in Easthampton, Massachusetts.

In 1874, Merriam attended the Sheffield Scientific School of Yale University, where he studied natural history and anatomy. While at Yale, he joined St. Anthony Hall. Among the faculty there, Merriam received instruction from such prominent figures as Alpheus Hyatt Verrill, Sidney Irving Smith, and Daniel Cady Eaton. During this time, Merriam published a short paper entitled "Ornithological Notes from the South," following a trip to Florida with his father.

Around this time, Merriam also published "A Review of the Birds of Connecticut," significant in that it recognized that the distribution of birds' ranges is governed by temperature during the breeding season; as well as a number of short papers from observations of birds near his Locust Grove house.

From assisting a Dr. Bacon in New Haven with surgeries, Merriam developed an interest in anatomy, and Merriam and his roommates would practice dissections of human cadavers obtained through a New York morgue. This interest in medicine and surgery led Merriam to move from Yale to the College of Physicians and Surgeons of Columbia University in 1877.

In 1878, while at medical school, Merriam helped organize the Linnaean Society of New York and served as its first president. Merriam also was an early member of the Nuttall Ornithological Club and an early contributor to its bulletin.

Merriam graduated with his M.D. from Columbia University in 1879 and returned to Locust Grove to practice medicine.

== Medical career and continued study of wildlife ==
From 1879 to 1885, after earning his M.D., Merriam returned to Locust Grove to practice medicine as a country doctor, becoming quite successful in the endeavor. During this time, Merriam invented scientific and surgical instruments as well as wrote a medical treatise, though the manuscript was unfortunately lost on the way to the printer. While practicing medicine, Merriam corresponded with his naturalist colleagues, and continued to build his collection of animal specimens, with a growing interest in mammals.

In 1881, he published a "Preliminary List of the Birds of the Adirondacks," followed by an exhaustive "Mammals of the Adirondacks" in 1884, which set a new standard for local wildlife studies, particularly in mammalogy, which was not then a well-established field. At this time, Merriam became interested in the underlying questions of species distribution, and hired a clerk to search meteorological records and compute monthly mean temperature in preparation. Merriam met with prominent figures in the sciences, including famed geologist and paleontologist James Hall and Charles Doolittle Walcott of the US Geological Survey, in an attempt to enlist their aid in securing state funding from the New York legislature for a statewide biological survey, but this effort was ultimately unsuccessful.

Merriam continued to expand his private collection of mammal specimens through correspondence, purchase from local taxidermists, and sometime placing orders for the collection of certain species. Through these efforts he met Vernon Bailey, a farmer's boy from Elk River, Minnesota with an impressive ability to collect species considered rare at the time, such as the vole. Merriam continued to employ Bailey as a collector throughout his career, remotely or as a travel companion, and Bailey would eventually marry Merriam's younger sister, Florence, in 1899. By 1884, the year Merriam described his first new species, Atophyrax bendirii (the marsh shrew), Merriam's working collection of mammals numbered over 7,000 specimens, rivaling any public collection at the time. Besides his zeal for collection and Bailey's mammal-collecting ability, Merriam's large mammal collection and emergence as a leader in mammalogy was aided by the invention of the "cyclone" deadfall trap, which made the systematic collection of small mammals a possibility.

In 1883, growing interest in ornithology in the US precipitated the formation of the American Ornithologists' Union, modeled after the then-established British Ornithologists' Union. Though the organization included such distinguished senior members as Spencer Fullerton Baird, George Newbold Lawrence, Charles Bendire, Elliott Coues, Joel Asaph Allen, and Robert Ridgeway, the young Merriam was elected secretary and treasurer of the newly formed organization and was appointed chairman of the Committee on Bird Migration and the Committee on Geographic Distribution and Economic Ornithology. So intensive were Merriam's plans for his committees that they exceeded the resources of the Union, and Merriam's father, with support of a New York senator and Professor Baird, secured a congressional appropriation of $10,000 to hire a chief ornithologist and establish an ornithology section under the Division of Entomology, within the U.S. Department of Agriculture. The formation of this political position, which Merriam would soon fill, would mark Merriam's transition from medical practitioner to career scientist.

== Zoology ==
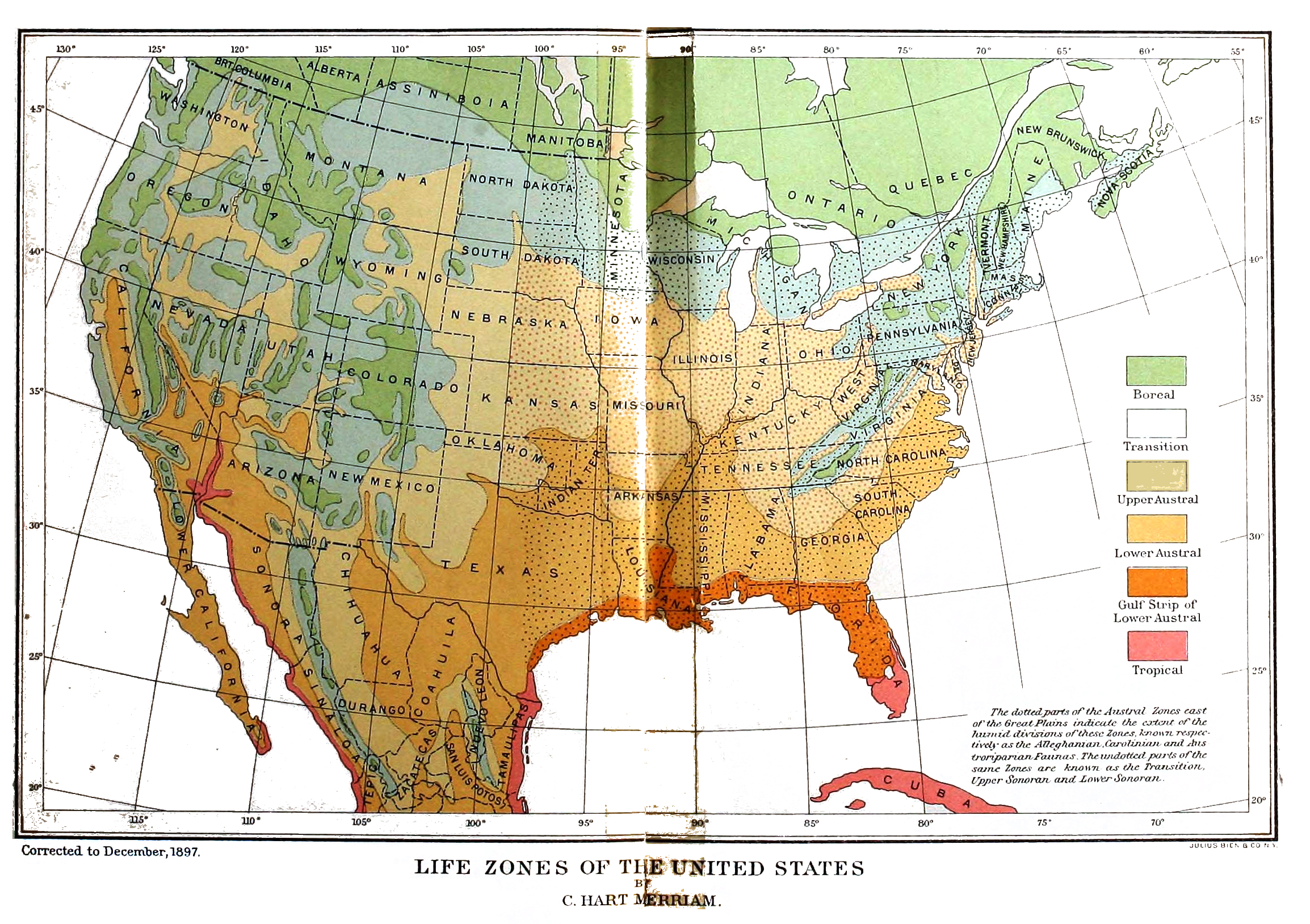
Life and crop zones according to Merriam (1898)

In 1886, he became the first chief of the Division of Economic Ornithology and Mammalogy of the United States Department of Agriculture, predecessor to the National Wildlife Research Center and the United States Fish and Wildlife Service. In 1883, he was a founding member of the American Ornithologists' Union. He was one of the original founders of the National Geographic Society in 1888. He developed the concept of "life zones" to classify biomes found in North America along an altitudinal sequence corresponding to the zonal latitudinal sequence from Equator to Pole. In mammalogy, he is known as an excessive splitter, proposing, for example, tens of different species of North American brown bears in several genera.

In 1899, he helped railroad magnate E. H. Harriman to organize an exploratory voyage along the Alaska coastline.

Some species of animals that bear his name are Merriam's canyon lizard (Sceloporus merriami ), Merriam's wild turkey (Meleagris gallopavo merriami ), the now extinct Merriam's elk (Cervus elaphus merriami ), Merriam's pocket mouse (Perognathus merriami ), Merriam's chipmunk (Tamias merriami ), and Merriam's ground squirrel (Urocitellus canus ).

His detail-oriented taxonomy and thorough field work were influential with zoologists for many years.

The standard author abbreviation Merriam is used to indicate this person as the author when citing a botanical name.

== American mammalogy ==
He began his career in natural science, at the age of 16, with an 1872 Harden Survey. At 18, he published a report of his biological studies on mammals and birds. Following his induction into natural sciences, Merriam studied at Yale and received his M.D from Columbia in 1879.

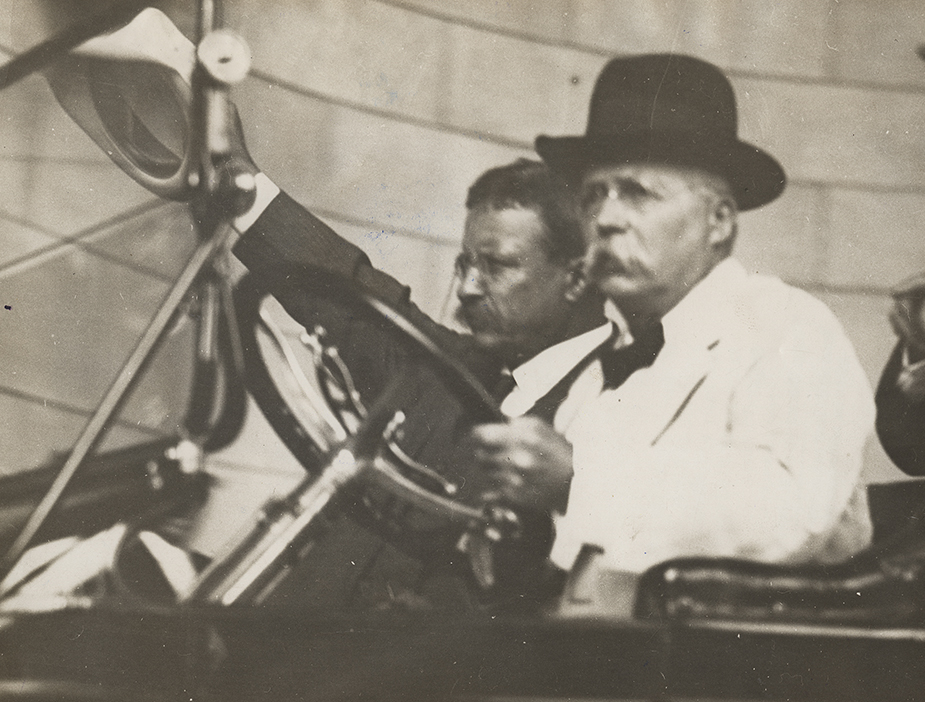
Merriam with Theodore Roosevelt in 1914

After college he began a brief career in medicine, but in 1883 his early fascination with the study of mammal species was revived, and he became one of the founding members of the American Ornithologists' Union in 1883, where he continued his studies on different species of mammals. The first term he coined was Atophyrax bendirii in 1884. With his growing reputation in the natural science sphere, he became close friends with future president Theodore Roosevelt (after whom he named the Roosevelt elk) and, at the age of 30, was asked to take charge of the newly established section of ornithology in the Entomological Division of the United States Department of Agriculture in 1885. This later became known as the Bureau of Biological Survey in 1905. Heading the Bureau for 25 years, he became a nationally known figure and improved the scientific understanding of the birds and mammals of the United States.

As head of the Bureau, Merriam inaugurated the North American Fauna series, in which he described 71 new species and several new genera of mammals. After revising brown and grizzly bears of North America, he named an additional 84 species. Merriam visited the Colorado Plateau in 1889. He published the results of a biological survey of the San Francisco Mountain region and desert of the Little Colorado in 1890, including the idea of "life zones" he had developed on the expedition. Merriam's concept of seven altitudinal "life zones" distinguished by differences in temperature and humidity was an important idea. In 1899, he helped organized the Harriman Alaska Expedition, with Edward Harriman, in which they explored coast of Alaska for two months, from Seattle to Siberia. Subsequently, he was named president of the American Ornithologists' Union in 1902. That same year, he was elected as a member to the American Philosophical Society.

Circa 1910 he began to focus on the ethnology of the peoples native to California.

== Native Americans ==
During Merriam's multiple trips to western North America to research and catalog biological organisms, he came to rely on the indigenous "locals" (Native Americans) for valuable information about the mammals he was studying. Through these inquiries and encounters, Merriam tried to learn Native languages to communicate with his contacts. He also became fascinated with the Native American cultures of California. As the North American Indian populations decreased dramatically in the late 19th century, Merriam realized that the people, languages, culture, and knowledge of these diverse tribes was being lost. He became determined to collect information about the Native American tribes of California before it was too late. Merriam stunned his colleagues in East Coast academic institutions by abandoning his career in mammalogy for anthropological and linguistic field work, for which he had no formal training. When Merriam's friend Harriman died, his widow offered Merriam an open academic grant and encouraged him to study whatever he pleased. Funded by the Harriman family, Merriam's focus shifted to studying and assisting the Native American tribes in the western US. His contributions on the myths of central California and on ethnogeography were noteworthy. Merriam is credited for collecting in his field notes a vast amount of information on the languages and customs of tribes that would otherwise have been unstudied. Merriam published many papers on his findings, and used his findings to advocate for California tribes; the majority of his field notes remain unpublished, and are largely stored in the basement of the University of California Berkeley Anthropology Museum, where they were transferred from The Smithsonian Institution, Merriam's academic home base.

== Personal life ==
Merriam married Virginia Elizabeth Gosnell, his secretary at the time, on October 15, 1886. Though he initially had qualms about her poor grammar and marrying beneath what he saw as his social level, he loved her and thought highly of her, ultimately encouraging her education. Virginia Elizabeth was Merriam's lifelong companion, often traveling with him during his field work in California. They had two daughters, Dorothy and Zenaida, the latter of whom would sometimes travel with her parents during Merriam's field work prior to her marriage.

Merriam's sister Florence Augusta Merriam Bailey was a pioneering ornithologist who published both popular books on birding and significant field guides for both the Western United States and New Mexico. She married Vernon Bailey, a field naturalist and long-time collecting partner of C. Hart Merriam's.

His grandson Lee Merriam Talbot (1930–2021) was a geographer and ecologist who was among the IUCN team which rediscovered the Persian fallow deer in 1957, and served as secretary general of the IUCN from 1980 to 1983.

== See also ==
- Category:Taxa named by Clinton Hart Merriam
- C. Hart Merriam Base Camp Site
- Mount Merriam
- Merriam Peak (California)

== Bibliography ==
- Bean, Lowell John. 1993. "Introduction". In The Dawn of the World: Myths and Tales of the Miwok Indians of California, by C. Hart Merriam, pp. 1–12. University of Nebraska Press, Lincoln.
- Kroeber, A. L. 1955. "C. Hart Merriam as Anthropologist". In Studies of California Indians, by C. Hart Merriam, pp. vii–xiv. University of California Press, Berkeley.
- Sterling, Keir B. 1974. The Last of the Naturalists: The Career of C. Hart Merriam. Arno Press, New York.
- Anon (1942). "[Merriam, C. H.]". Entomol. News. 53: 150.
- Anon (1942). "[Merriam, C. H.]". Science. 95: 318.
- Daubunnire, R. F. (1938). "[Merriam, C. H.]". Quart. Rev. Biol. 13: 327–332.
