= C. Hart Merriam Base Camp Site =

NRHP site in Coconino County, Arizona

- U.S. National Register of Historic Places
- U.S. National Historic Landmark
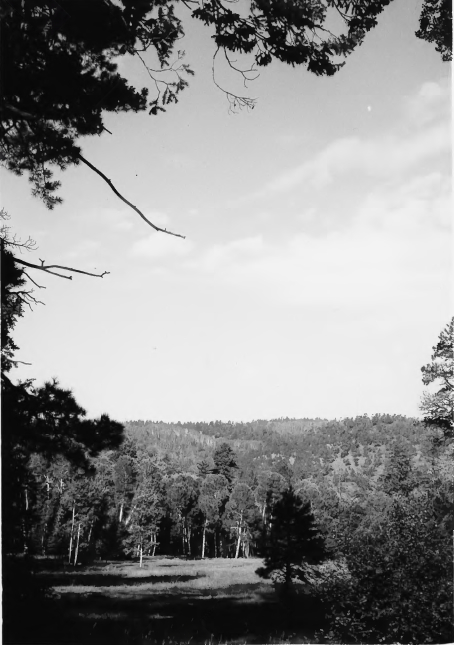
- The meadow at Merriam's base camp site, 1964

- Location within Arizona Location within the United States
- Nearest city: Flagstaff, Arizona
- Coordinates: 35°18′10″N 111°57′32″W
- Area: 2.5 acres (1.0 ha)
- Built: 1889
- NRHP reference No.: 66000173

Significant dates
- Added to NRHP: October 15, 1966
- Designated NHL: December 21, 1965

The C. Hart Merriam Base Camp Site is a historic campsite in Coconino National Forest, north of Flagstaff, Arizona. It is significant for its association with Clinton Hart Merriam (1855–1942), the United States' first eco-biologist. The site was designated a National Historic Landmark in 1965.

== Description and history ==
The Merriam Base Camp Site is located about 20 miles (32 km) northwest of Flagstaff, Arizona; about three miles east of U.S. Highway 180, southeast of the intersection of Forest Roads 151 and 418, within the Coconino National Forest. The Arizona Trail passes near the Merriam Base Camp Site. The campsite is located at an elevation of about 8,300 feet (2,500 m), on a knoll in the foothills northwest of Humphreys Peak, near Little Spring, a natural spring emanating from a meadow.

This camp is the site from which Clinton Hart Merriam, then head of a predecessor of the United States Fish and Wildlife Service, performed the fieldwork and research leading to the development of the ecological concept of the life zone. He described life zones in the San Francisco Mountains, in which the distribution of animal and plant life was described with respect to latitude, altitude, and other environmental factors. Merriam's work in this area was flawed but important, driving the development and refinement of what was then a new concept.

== See also ==
- List of National Historic Landmarks in Arizona
- National Register of Historic Places listings in Coconino County, Arizona
