= D. M. Francis House =

Historic house in Arizona, United States

- U.S. National Register of Historic Places
- Location within Arizona
- Location: 1456 Meade Ln., Flagstaff, Arizona
- Coordinates: 35.21845°N 111.65717°W
- Area: less than one acre
- Built: 1917
- Architectural style: Bungalow/craftsman
- MPS: Flagstaff MRA
- NRHP reference No.: 86000902
- Added to NRHP: April 30, 1986

The D. M. Francis House, at 1456 Meade Lane in Flagstaff, Arizona, is a historic bungalow house which was home of a large-scale sheepman. It was built in 1917 and was listed on the National Register of Historic Places in 1986.

It was built as a home for D. M. Francis, who was prominent in sheepraising in Coconino County. Francis "was one of the only 47 pioneer sheepmen who established ranches in Coconino County between 1881 and 1890." Francis teamed up with Hugh E. Campbell in forming the Campbell-Francis Sheep Co., which was one of the largest sheepraising companies in Arizona in the early 1900s.

In 1943 the front of the house was partially covered by vines.

The house was surveyed as part of a study of historic resources of Flagstaff in 1985; the study termed it "the finest local academic example of the Craftsman Bungalow style combining wood detailing with the massive walls and porch piers of locally available malpais rubble."

It was deemed significant for association with Francis and as the "best local representative of the Bungalow style." The house "fully articulates the design concepts and themes of the Bungalow style", and its "use of locally available malpais rock in construction combined with wood shingled walls is a classic expression of the Craftsman principles.

Google Streetview imagery from 2009 shows that the porch has been closed in with windows in between the malpais columns of the porch, which detracts from the Bungalow styling and from the historic character of the house.
