= Big Springs, Arizona =

Unincorporated community in the state of Arizona, United States

- Unincorporated community
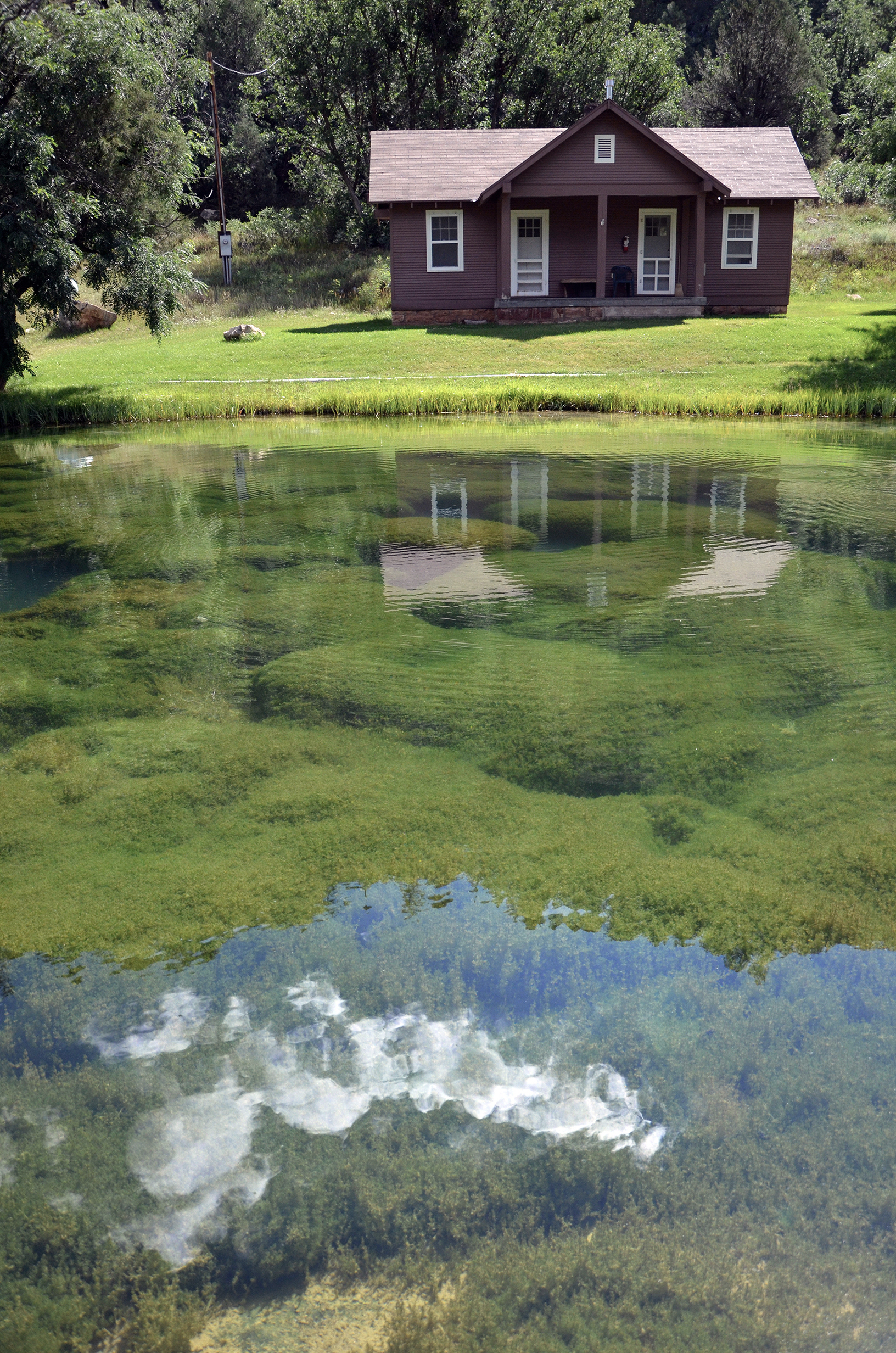
- Big Springs Cabin and Pond, USFS

- Location within Arizona Location within the United States
- Coordinates: 36°36′06″N 112°21′00″W
- Country: United States
- State: Arizona
- County: Coconino
- Elevation: 6,949 ft (2,118 m)
- Time zone: UTC-7 (Mountain (MST))
- Area code: 928
- GNIS feature ID: 1379

Big Springs is an unincorporated community in Coconino County, Arizona, United States. Big Springs is located in Kaibab National Forest, 10.8 miles (17.4 km) southwest of Jacob Lake.

The Big Springs Lookout Tower and Big Springs Ranger Station, which are both listed on the National Register of Historic Places, are located near Big Springs.

The Big Springs location is used at times by the Forest Service as summer crew station for surveys and firefighting. Buildings include crew cabins, shower and bath house, cafeteria, barn, and house for staff.

== Gallery ==
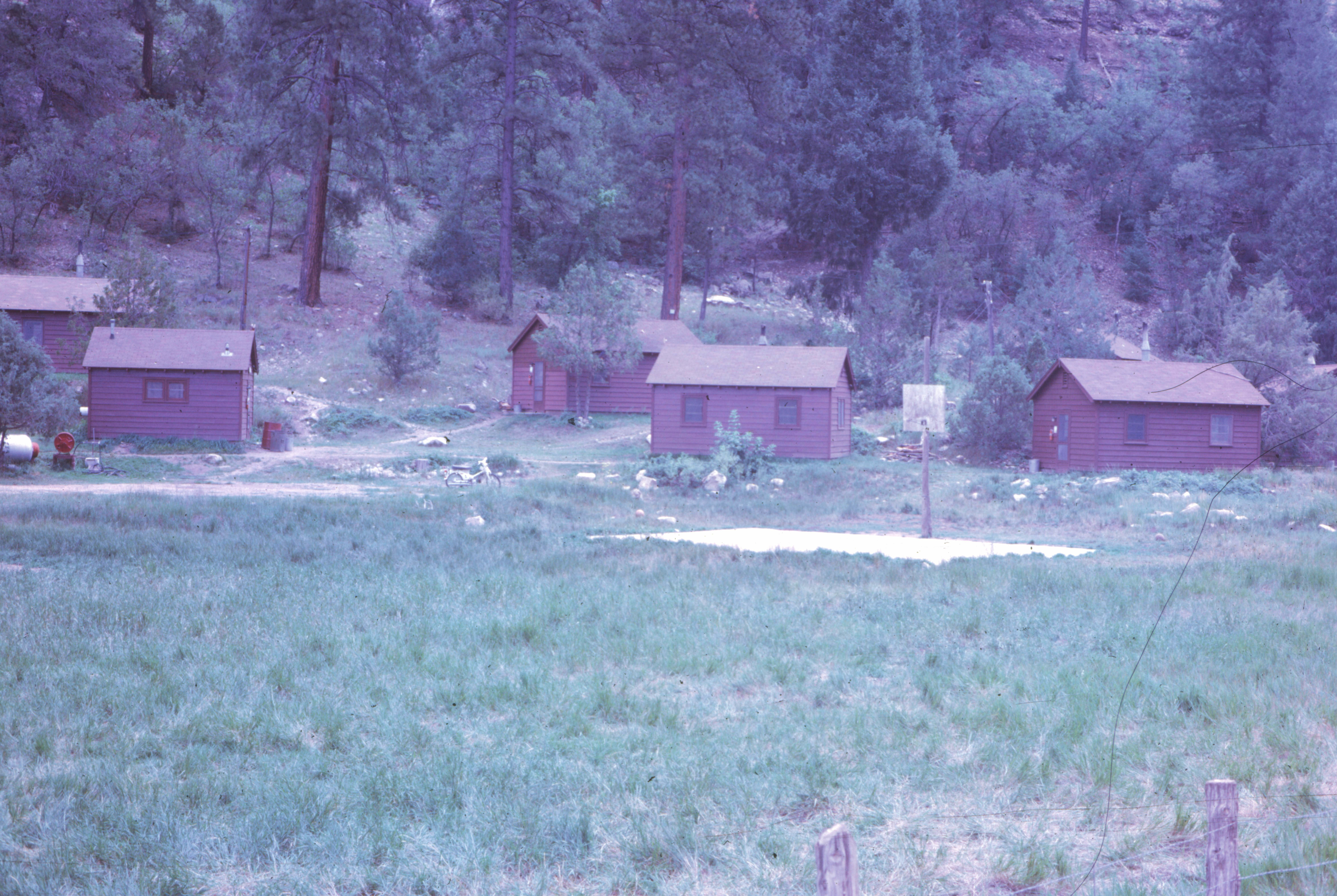
Crew cabins in 1970.
