= Williams Residential Historic District =

- U.S. National Register of Historic Places
- Location: Roughly bounded by Grant, and Fairview Aves., and Taber, and Sixth Sts., Williams, Arizona
- Area: 65 acres (26 ha)
- Built by: George Baumann, Carl Hinds, William Raver, others
- Architect: Orville Bell, others
- Architectural style: Late Victorian, Late 19th And 20th Century Revivals, Late 19th And Early 20th Century American Movements
- NRHP reference No.: 97001603
- Added to NRHP: January 8, 1998

The Williams Residential Historic District is a 65 acres (26 ha) historic district in Williams, Arizona which was listed on the National Register of Historic Places in 1998.The district is roughly bounded by Grant and Fairview Aves. and by Taber and Sixth Streets.

It includes works by architect Orville Bell. The district included 130 contributing buildings.

The district includes a concentration of late nineteenth and early to middle twentieth century buildings that still retain historic and architectural integrity. All of the buildings relate to residential development that occurred in the Williams Townsite and the Perrin Addition from 1890 to 1941. Some of the houses in the district incorporated a few prefabricated millwork components. The district was added to the National Register of Historic Places on January 8, 1998, reference #97001603. There are two individual properties within the historic district which are solely listed in the NRHP. They are the First Methodist Episcopal Church and Parsonage and the Negrette House.

Among other properties, it includes:

- First Methodist Episcopal Church and Parsonage (1891), 127 W. Sherman Ave (aka Community United Methodist Church). The church was separately listed in the National Register in 1984.
- American Legion Clubhouse (1936), 425 W. Grant Ave.
- C.E. Boyce House (1890), 133 W. Grant Ave. Cormick E. Boyce has been credited with being the pioneer merchant of Williams. He came to the Williams area in 1881. By the middle of the 1880s Boyce had already acquired considerable real estate in Williams. In the early 1890s Boyce's two-story brick Grand Canyon Hotel (WMB-41, 1892) was erected. It opened its doors to the public in January, 1892, as the Grand Canyon Hotel. The Grand Canyon Hotel in Williams is the oldest hotel in Arizona.
- Henry Cone House (1892), 341 W. Sherman Ave.
- John Keck House (1891), 101 W. Sherman Ave.
- Michael Shelley House (1891), 228 S. 2nd Street.
- Negrette House – The Saginaw Mill built house in 1893, which is located at 160 E. 6th Street, as a bunk house and office. In 1919, the Negrette family bought the house for $810. The house was listed in the National Register of Historic Places on October 8, 2014, reference #14000823.
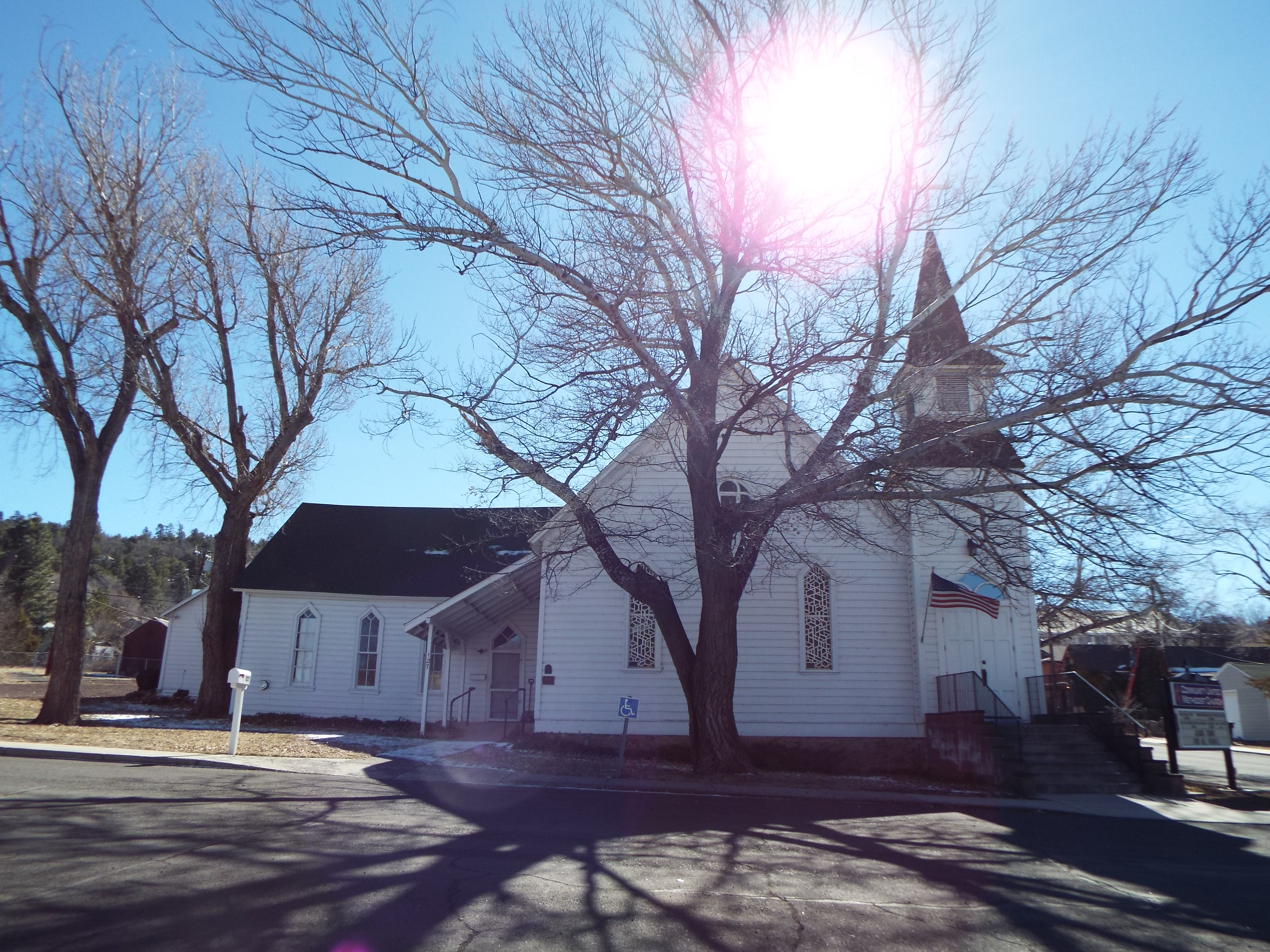
First Methodist Episcopal Church and Parsonage

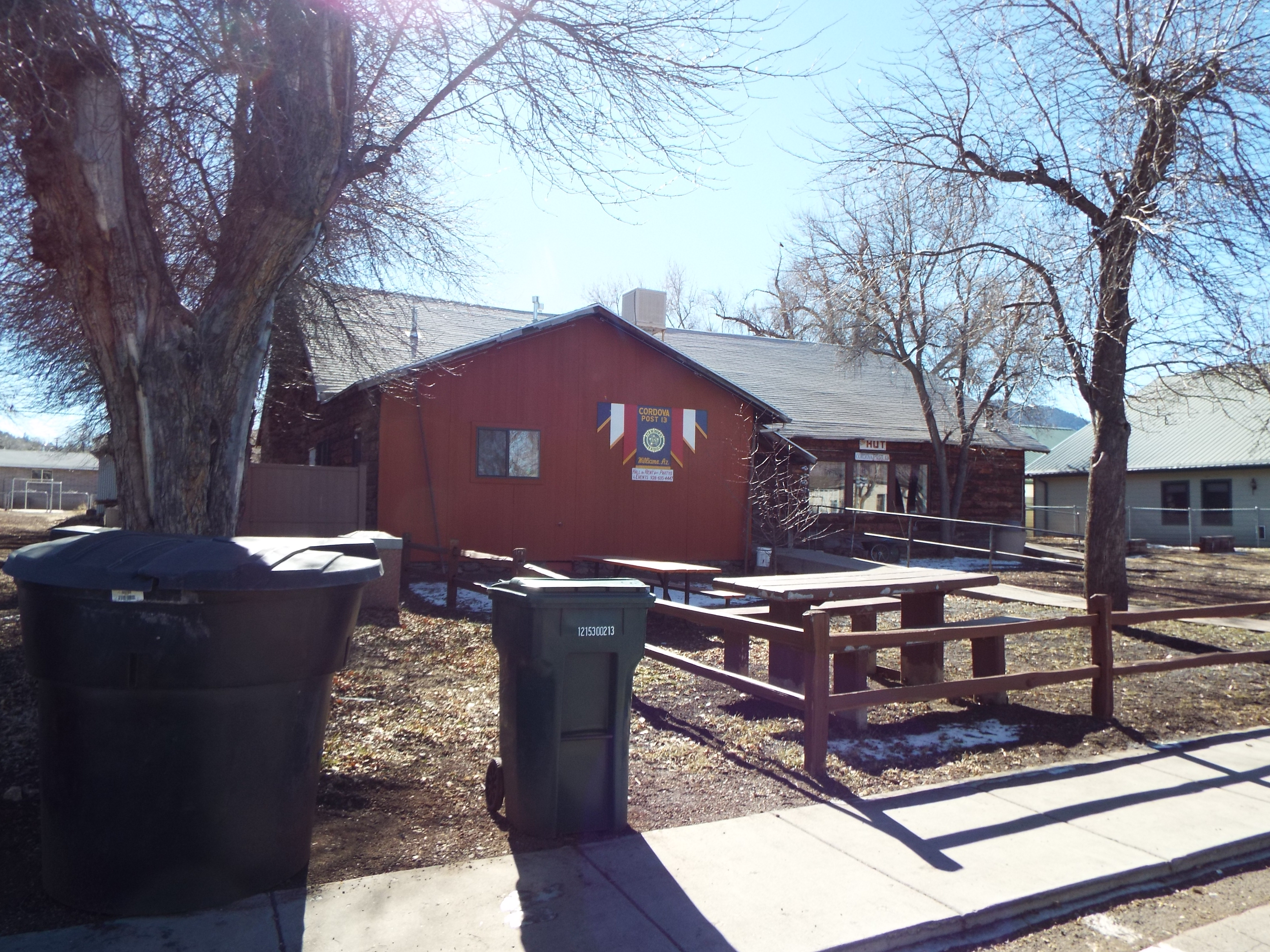
The American Legion Clubhouse

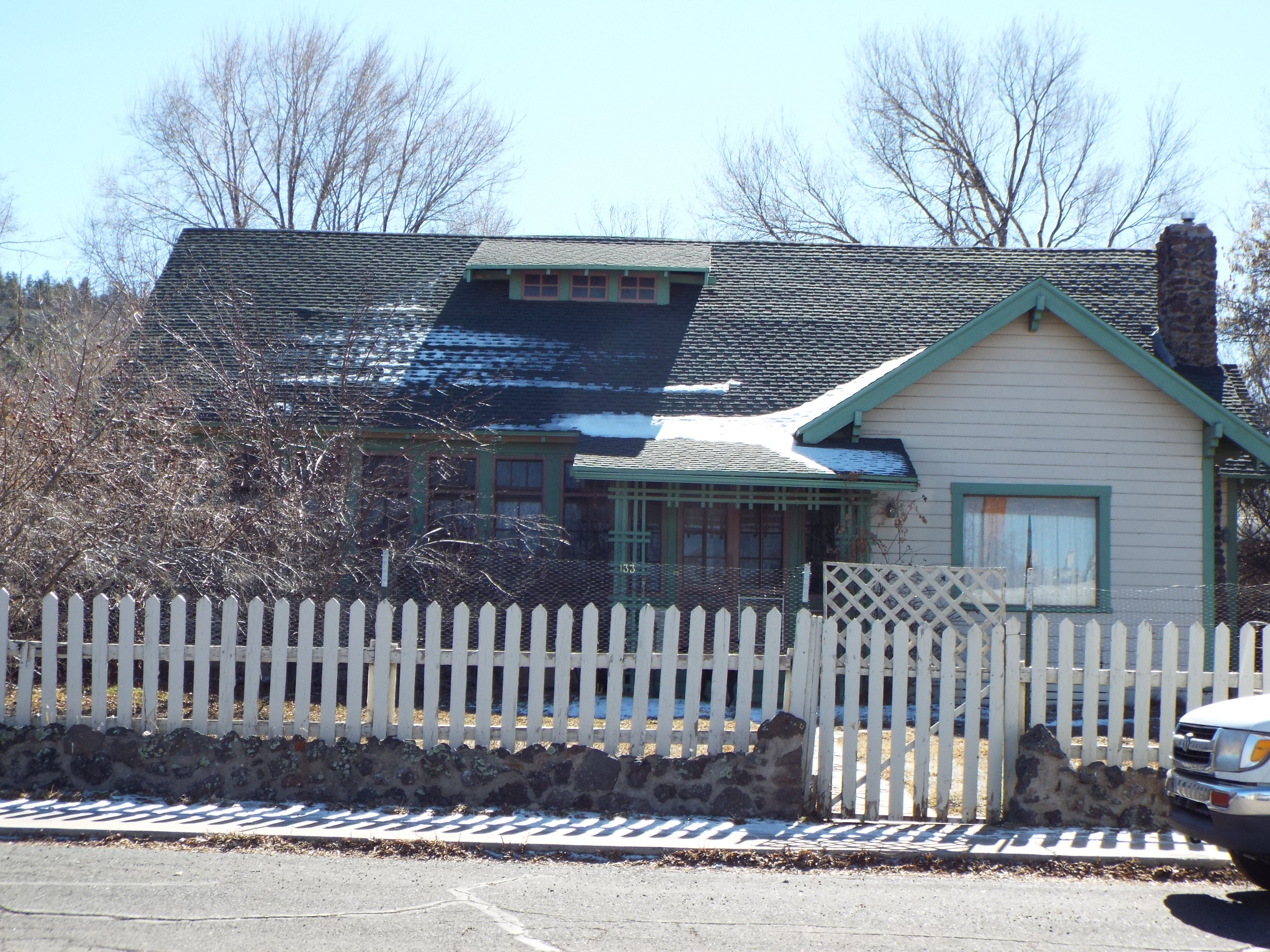
The C.E. Boyce House

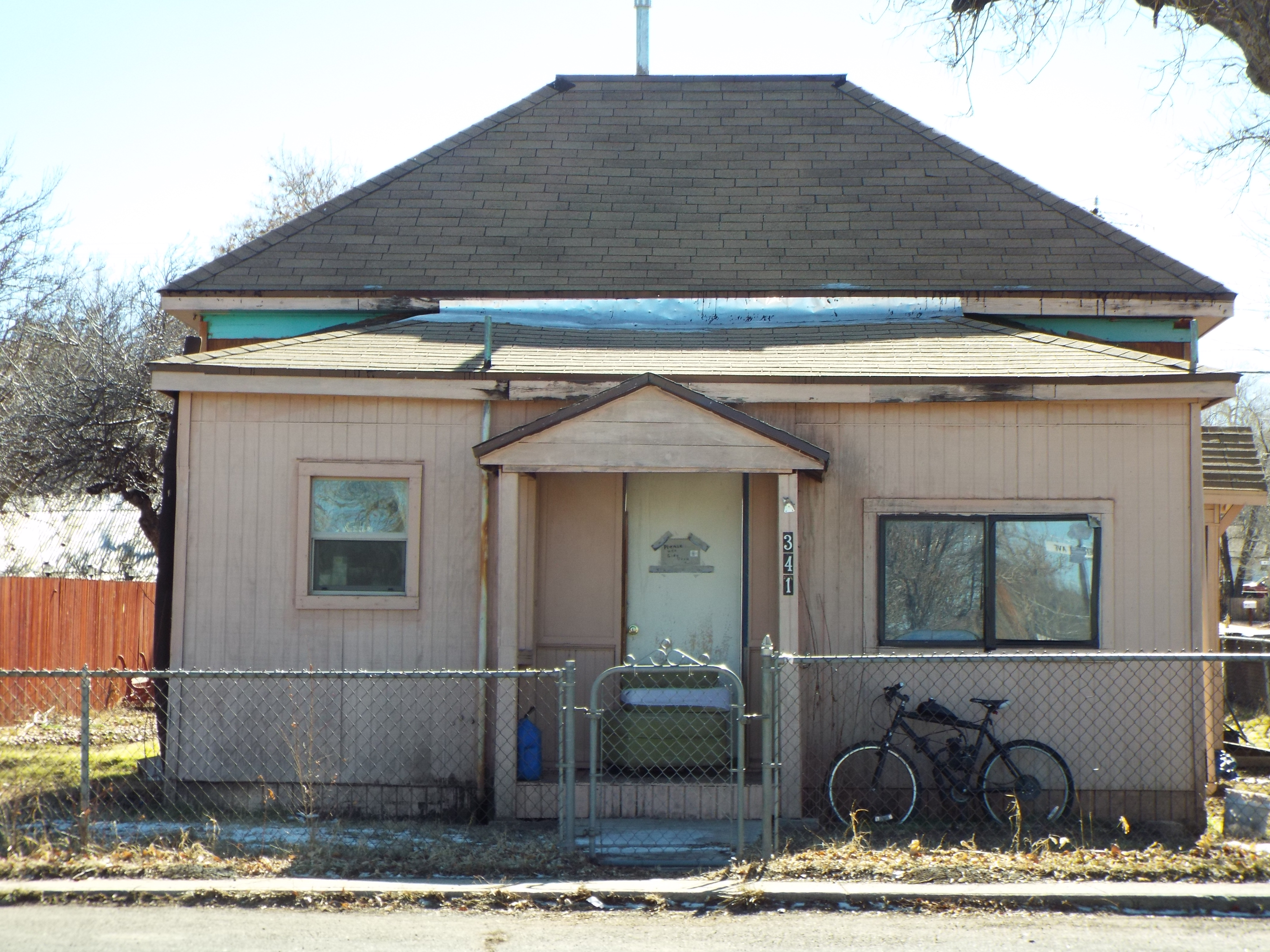
The Henry Cone House

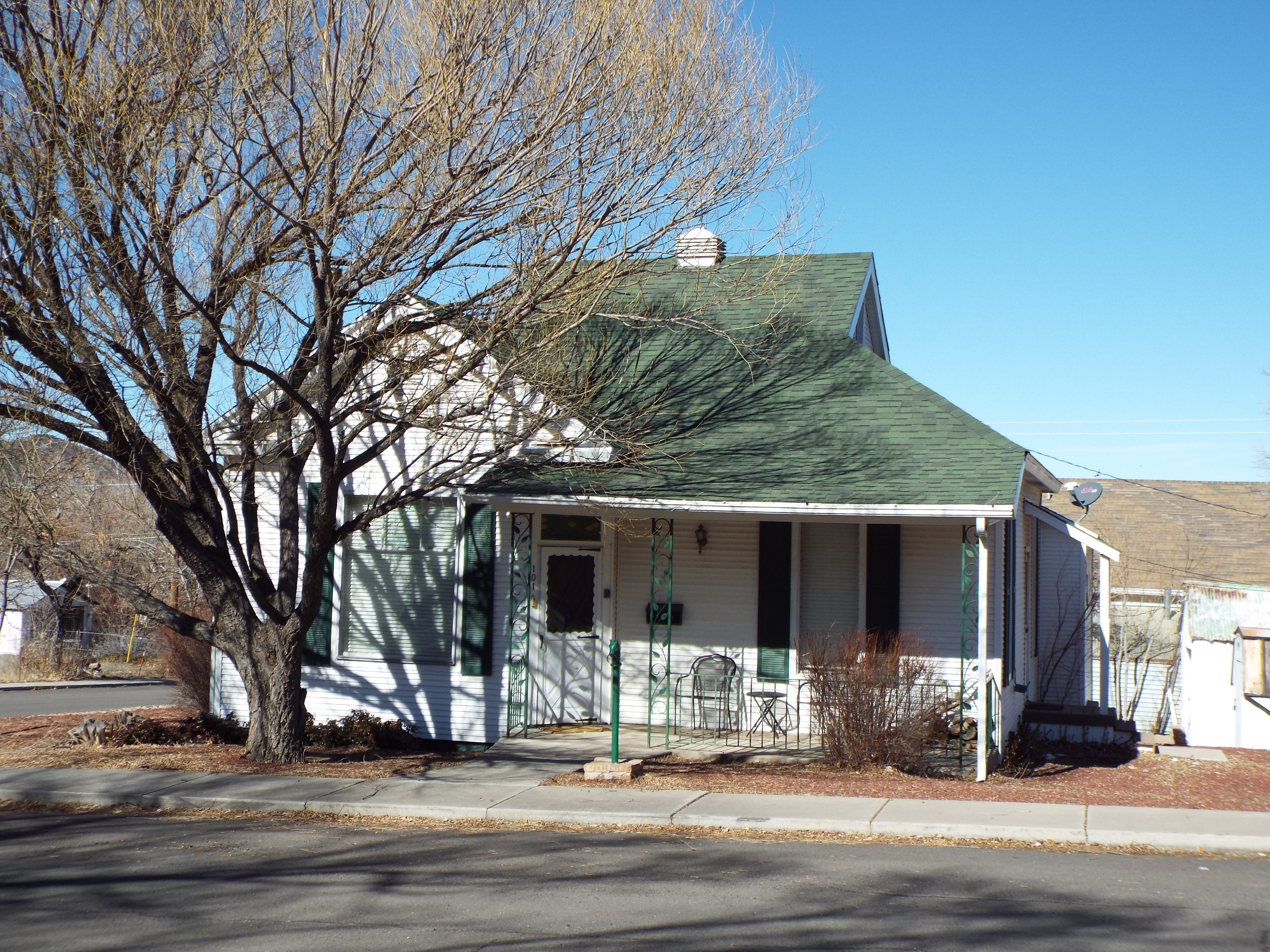
The John Keck House

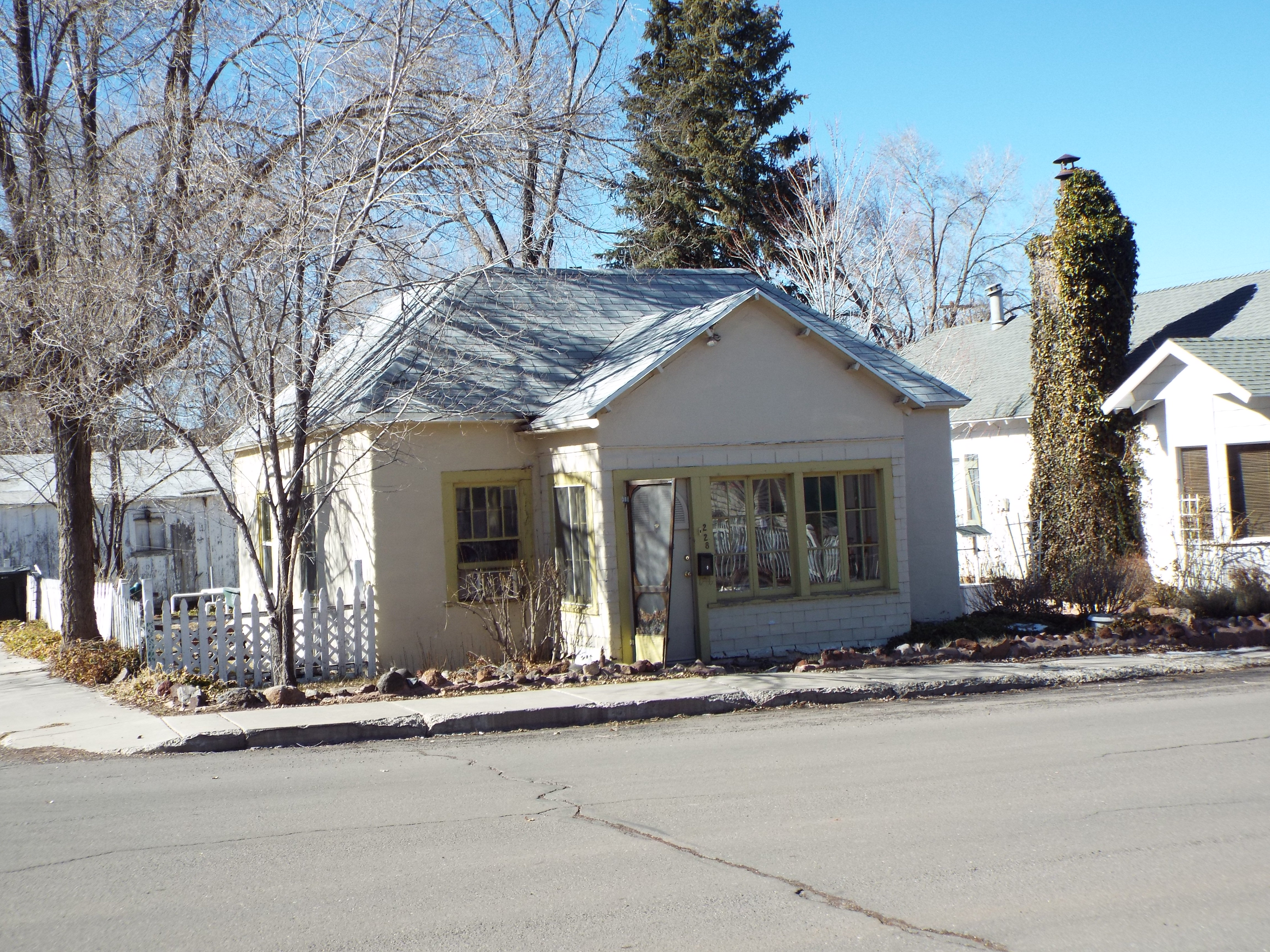
The Michael Shelley House

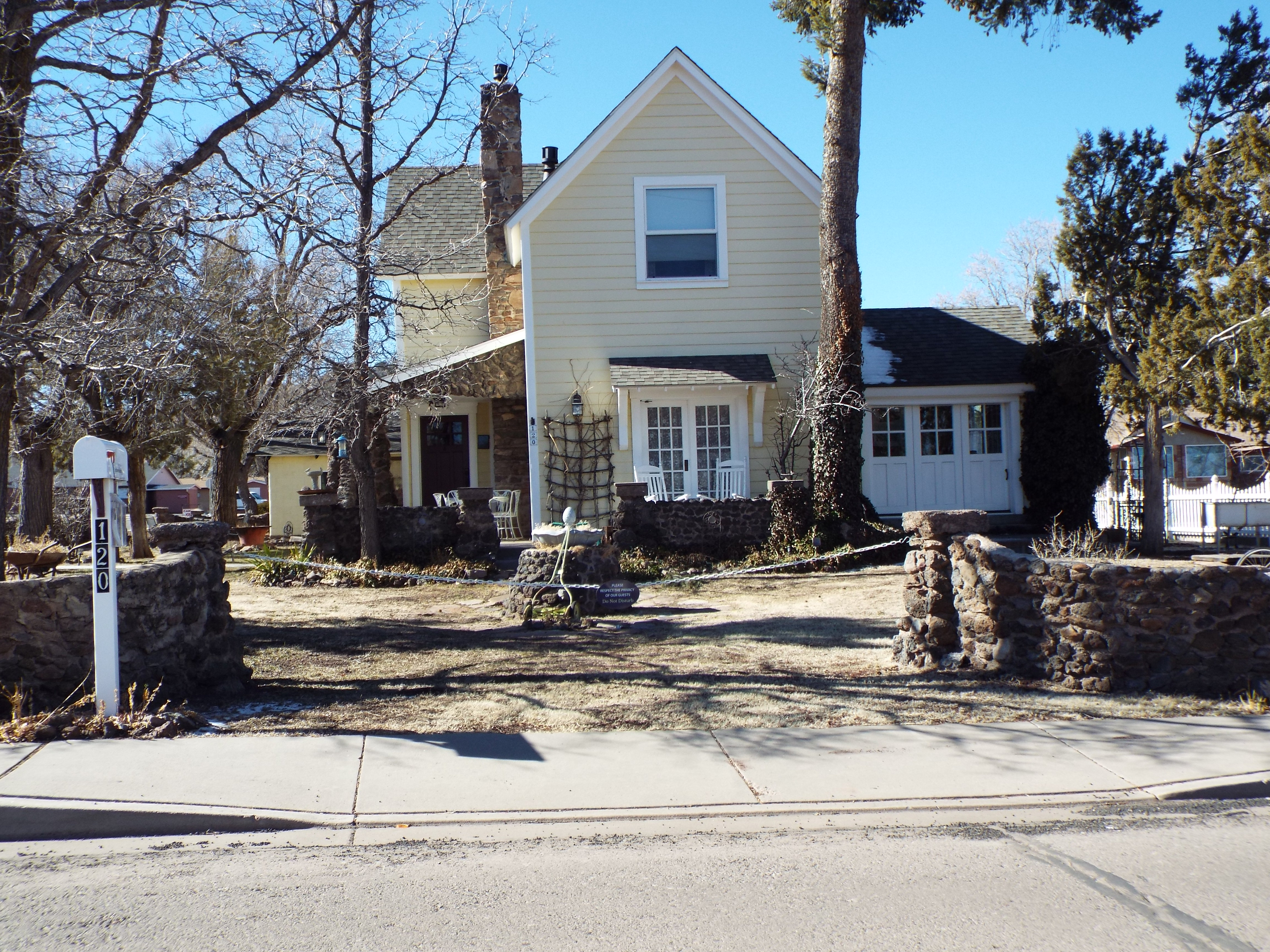
The Negrette House
