= Big Springs Ranger Station =

- U.S. National Register of Historic Places
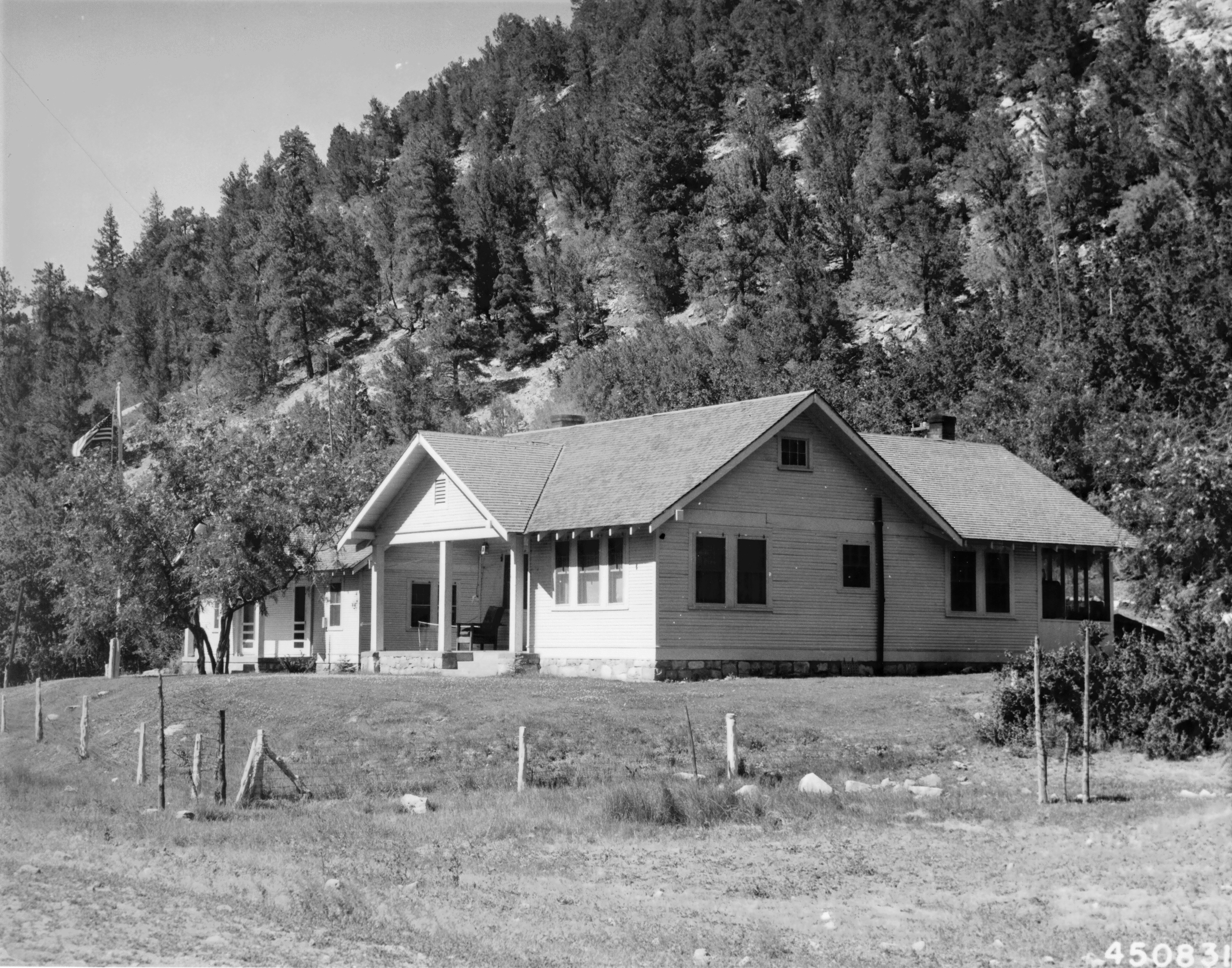
- Big Springs Ranger Station. 1948 by E. L. Perry

- Location within Arizona Location within the United States
- Nearest city: Big Springs, Arizona
- Coordinates: 36°36′12″N 112°20′59″W
- Area: 2 acres (8,100 m^{2})
- Built: 1934
- Architect: USDA Forest Service
- Architectural style: Bungalow
- MPS: Depression-Era USDA Forest Service Administrative Complexes in Arizona MPS
- NRHP reference No.: 93000519
- Added to NRHP: June 10, 1993

The Big Springs Ranger Station is a ranger station located in Kaibab National Forest near Big Springs, Arizona. The ranger station was built by the Civilian Conservation Corps in 1934. The complex includes a house, an office building, and a barn with an attached corral; while these are the only contributing structures to the district, it also includes a number of outbuildings. U.S. Forest Service architects designed the buildings in a Bungalow style characteristic of Forest Service architectural plans during the 1930s.

The ranger station was added to the National Register of Historic Places on June 10, 1993.

== See also ==
- Big Springs Lookout Tower, also NRHP-listed
