= Big Springs Lookout Tower =

- U.S. National Register of Historic Places
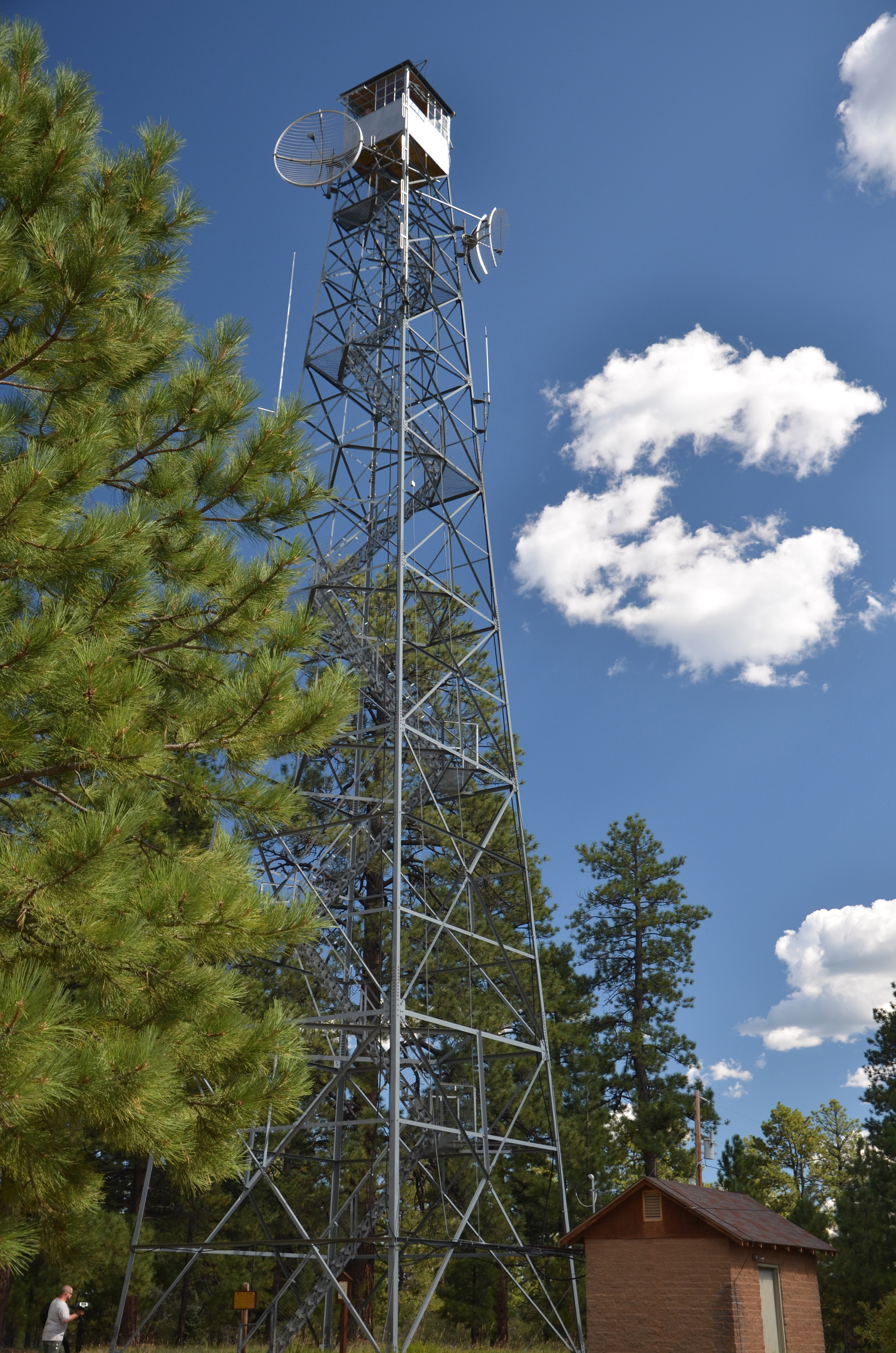

- Location within Arizona Location within the United States
- Location: Kaibab National Forest, Big Springs, Arizona
- Coordinates: 36°35′36″N 112°20′3″W
- Area: less than one acre
- Built: 1934
- MPS: National Forest Fire Lookouts in the Southwestern Region TR
- NRHP reference No.: 87002478
- Added to NRHP: January 28, 1988

The Big Springs Lookout Tower is a fire lookout tower in Kaibab National Forest near Big Springs, Arizona. The tower was built in 1934 for the U.S. Forest Service by contractors from Kanab, Utah. The steel tower is 100 feet (30 m) tall and features a 7-foot (2.1 m) square cab at the top. A wood-frame cabin is located near the base of the tower; the cabin was built in 1959 to replace an older log cabin.

The tower was listed on the National Register of Historic Places in 1988.

== See also ==
- Big Springs Ranger Station
