= Life zone =

Concept developed by C. Hart Merriam in 1889

The life zone concept was developed by C. Hart Merriam in 1889 as a means of describing areas with similar plant and animal communities. Merriam observed that the changes in these communities with an increase in latitude at a constant elevation are similar to the changes seen with an increase in elevation at a constant latitude.

== Merriam ==
The life zones Merriam identified are most applicable to western North America, being developed on the San Francisco Peaks, Arizona and Cascade Range of the northwestern USA. He tried to develop a system that is applicable across the North American continent, but that system is rarely referred to.

=== List ===
The life zones that Merriam identified, along with characteristic plants, are as follows:

- Lower Sonoran (low, hot desert): creosote bush, Joshua tree
- Upper Sonoran (desert steppe or chaparral): sagebrush, scrub oak, Colorado pinyon, Utah juniper
- Transition (open woodlands): ponderosa pine
- Canadian (fir forest): Rocky Mountain Douglas fir, quaking aspen
- Hudsonian (spruce forest): Engelmann spruce, Rocky Mountains bristlecone pine
- Arctic-Alpine (alpine meadows or tundra): lichen, grass

The Canadian and Hudsonian life zones are commonly combined into a Boreal life zone.

=== Criticism ===
This system has been criticized as being too imprecise. For example, the scrub oak chaparral in Arizona shares relatively few plant and animal species with the Great Basin sagebrush desert, yet both are classified as Upper Sonoran. However it is still sometimes referred to by biologists (and anthropologists) working in the western United States. Much more detailed and empirically based classifications of vegetation and life zones now exist for most areas of the world, such as the list of world ecoregions defined by the World Wide Fund for Nature, or the list of North American ecoregions defined by the Commission for Environmental Cooperation.

== Holdridge ==
Holdridge life zone classification scheme. Although conceived as three-dimensional by its originator, is usually shown as a two-dimensional array of hexagons in a triangular frame.

In 1947, Leslie Holdridge published a life zone classification using indicators of:

- mean annual biotemperature (logarithmic)
- annual precipitation (logarithmic)
- ratio of annual potential evapotranspiration to mean total annual precipitation.

Biotemperature refers to all temperatures above freezing, with all temperatures below freezing adjusted to 0 °C, as plants are dormant at these temperatures. Holdridge's system uses biotemperature first, rather than the temperate latitude bias of Merriam's life zones, and does not primarily use elevation. The system is considered more appropriate to the complexities of tropical vegetation than Merriam's system.

== See also ==
- Biogeographic realm
- Biome
- Ecoregion
- Köppen climate classification
