= Grand Canyon Water Reclamation Plant =

- Water Reclamation Plant
- U.S. National Register of Historic Places
- U.S. Historic district
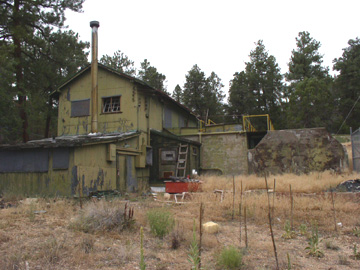

- Location within Arizona Location within the United States
- Location: S of Grand Canyon National Park, Rte. 8A, Grand Canyon, Arizona
- Coordinates: 36°2′54″N 112°9′19″W
- Built: 1926
- NRHP reference No.: 74000348
- Added to NRHP: September 6, 1974

The Grand Canyon Water Reclamation Plant in Grand Canyon National Park was one of the first water reclamation plants in the United States, pioneering operating principles that are in use in modern facilities. It is located on the South Rim in Grand Canyon Village, the center of tourist development in the park.

The scarcity of water and the high demand for fresh water in the developed areas of the park encouraged the development of a system to treat wastewater so that it could be used for non-potable purposes such as flushing toilets, supplying steam locomotive boilers, irrigation and similar uses. The Grand Canyon water plant was completed in May 1926, producing water that was claimed to be potable (but never used for drinking) at a cost that was one-sixth of the cost for new water. The plant was expanded in 1934 to serve the Bright Angel Lodge.

== Description ==
The treatment plant consists of a set of bar-screen boxes, a sedimentation tank, three aeration tanks, two clarifiers, one secondary tank, two filters, an approximately 300,000-US-gallon (1,100,000 L) holding tank, and a water tank for backwashing filters. The mechanical systems are housed in a two-story frame structure on a concrete base that contains filters, aeration generators and the chlorination system, as well as an office, laboratory and shop.

The treatment process passed wastewater through the bar screen, which filtered out large solids, then to a measuring followed by a finer bar screen flume. Solids from the bar screens went to a sludge pond, while coarsely filtered water went to a pre-sedimentation tank, which separated grease and additional solids. An aeration stage allowed aerobic bacteria to work, followed by a pass through clarifier tanks. Filters used anthracite coal to give final clarity, followed by chlorination and storage. The plant operated with its original equipment until it closed. Most of the equipment is original.

== Historic designation ==
The historic land embraced in this site is a rectangle formed by using the aeration tanks as a center and extending lines 100 yards to the north, 200 yards to the east, 200 yards to the west, and 400 yards to the south. The treatment plant was placed on the National Register of Historic Places on September 6, 1974.
