= Barney Flat Historic Railroad Logging Landscape =

- U.S. National Register of Historic Places
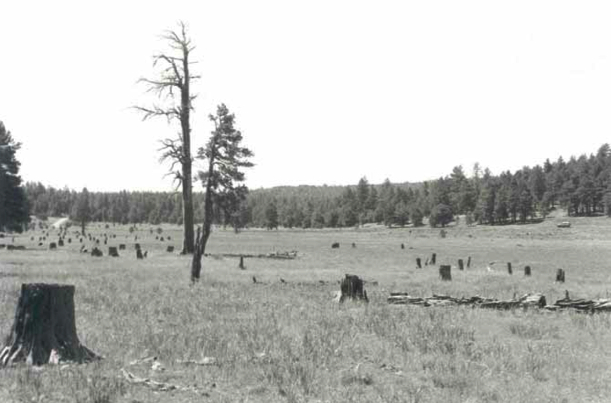
- Stump field in Barney Flat. High stumps like these are evidence of historic logging practices. It was too difficult for loggers to use a hand cross-saw at the base of trees.

- Location within Arizona Location within the United States
- Nearest city: Williams, Arizona
- Coordinates: 35°9′26″N 112°8′52″W
- Built: 1899
- MPS: Logging Railroad Resources of the Coconino and Kaibab National Forests MPS
- NRHP reference No.: 95000155
- Added to NRHP: February 24, 1995

The Barney Flat Historic Railroad Logging Landscape is the historic remains of railroad logging on the South Kaibab Plateau in the early 20th century. Barney Flat is the only stump field on the US National Register of Historic Places. Barney Flat is located in the Kaibab National Forest, along the Perkinsville Road, south of Williams, Arizona. It was added to the National Register of Historic Places on February 24, 1995.

== Railroad logging (1897–1936) ==
The Saginaw and Manistee logging company used temporary logging railroads to clearcut the South Kaibab of ponderosa pines between 1897 and 1936. When the Williams mill ran out of timber in 1928, operations turned north to the Tusayan Ranger District, south of Grand Canyon National Park. The Saginaw and Manistee used the Grand Canyon Railway line between 1928 and 1936. To access the timber stands loggers simply laid ties and set down rail. As almost all rail was reused until it was worn out, then sold for scrap iron, only the wooden cross ties remain as evidence of this historic logging practice.

== Barney Flat stump field ==
Many foresters believe that pre-settlement Southwestern ponderosa pine forests contained 20–40 trees per acre. However, detailed mapping of the Barney Flat Stump Field counted 300 stumps in a 40-acre (160,000 m^{2}) area. This is less than 10 trees per acre.

== Historic logging railroad grades ==
Kaibab National Forest archaeologists have now mapped the locations and conditions of over 100 miles of logging railroad grades. These maps provide information about when and how the forests were logged. Based on the condition of these historic features, archaeologists determine their eligibility for the National Register of Historic Places.

== Gallery ==
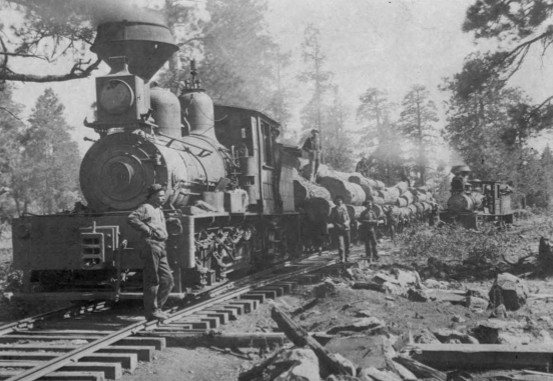
Railroad Logging in the South Kaibab, circa 1900
