= First Baptist Church (Flagstaff, Arizona) =

Historic church in Coconino County, Arizona

- U.S. National Register of Historic Places
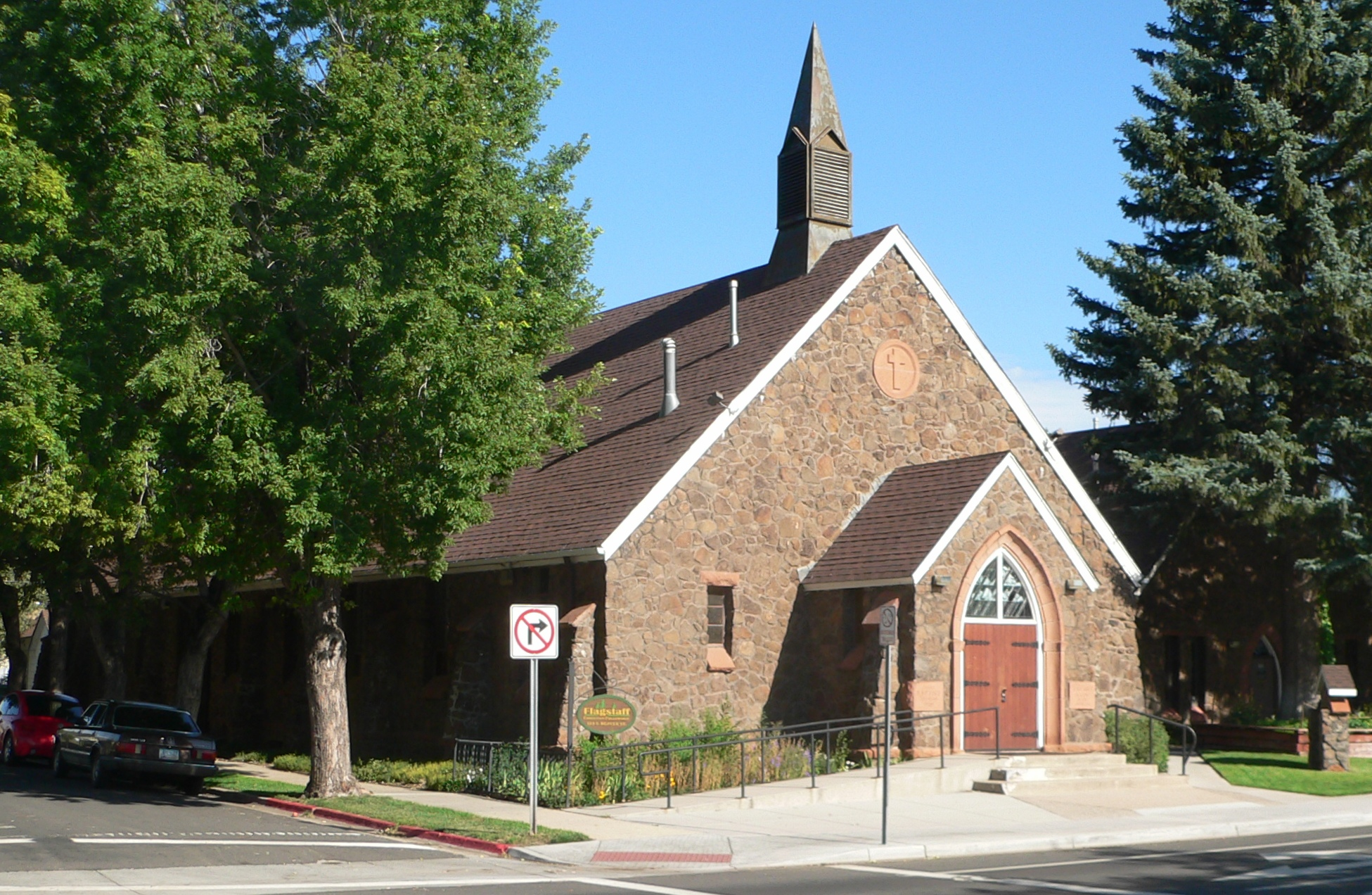

- Location within Arizona Location within the United States
- Location: 123 S. Beaver St., Flagstaff, Arizona
- Coordinates: 35°11′44″N 111°39′06″W
- Area: less than one acre
- Built: 1939
- Architect: Bell, Orville
- Architectural style: Late Gothic Revival
- NRHP reference No.: 91001576
- Added to NRHP: December 23, 1991

First Baptist Church (also known as Glad Tidings Baptist Church; Flagstaff Christian Fellowship) is a historic Conservative Baptist church at 123 S. Beaver Street in Flagstaff, Arizona, United States.

It was built in 1939 and added to the National Register in 1991.
