= Krenz-Kerley Trading Post =

- U.S. National Register of Historic Places
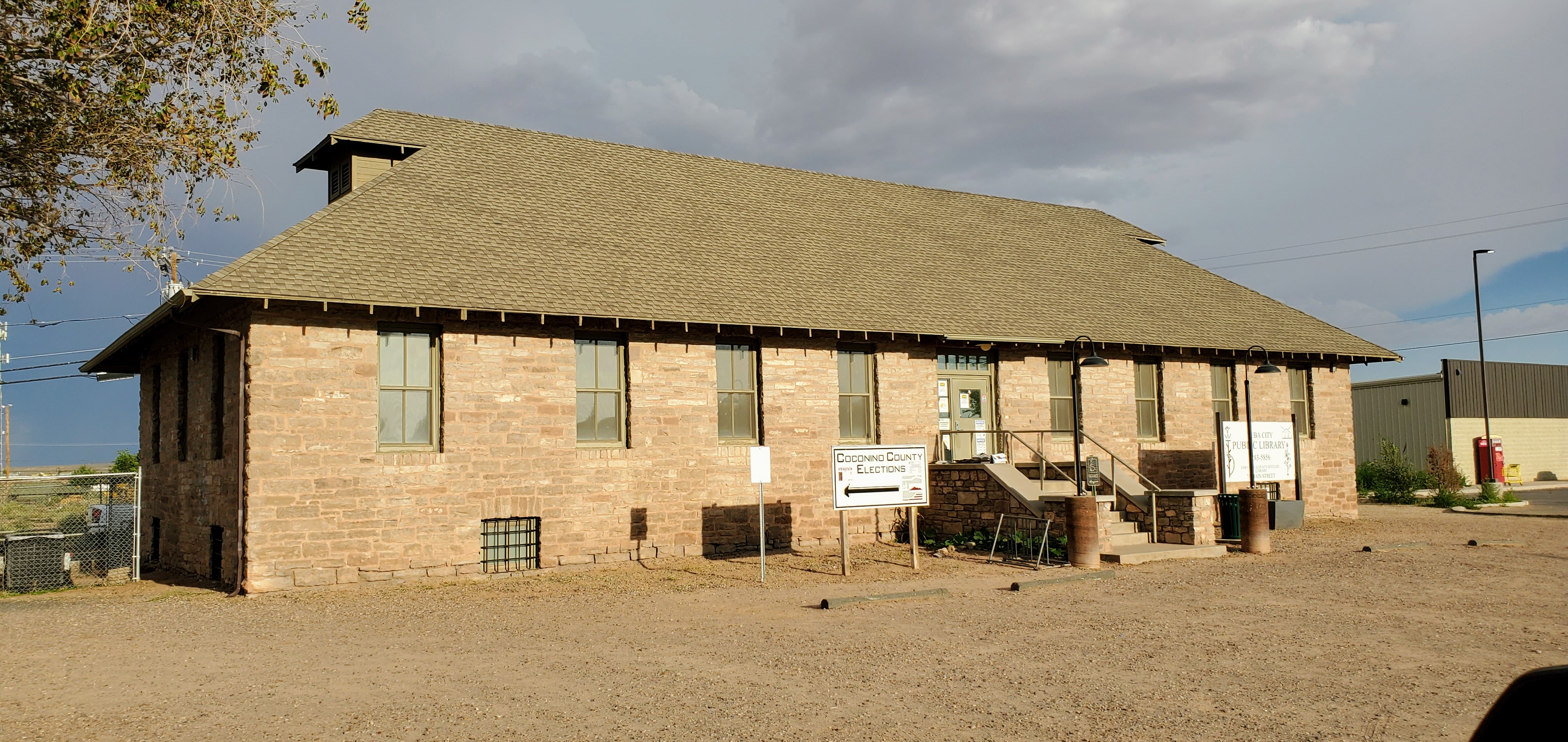
- Krenz-Kerley Trading Post, 2022

- Location within Arizona
- Location: E. side of Main St., Tuba City, Arizona
- Coordinates: 36°07′53″N 111°14′21″W
- Area: 0.4 acres (0.16 ha)
- Built: 1915
- Built by: Frederick D. Krenz
- Architectural style: Colonial Revival
- NRHP reference No.: 98001040
- Added to NRHP: August 24, 1998

The Krenz-Kerley Trading Post, in Tuba City, Arizona, was built in 1915. It was listed on the National Register of Historic Places in 1998.

It is located at 78 N. Main St., on the east side of Main Street.

It is located "within the part of Tuba City that was a Mormon townsite from 1878 until 1903 (Judd 1965; Brugge 1972). The Mormons installed an irrigation system that watered fruit trees, Lombardy poplars, cottonwoods, and vegetable fields. Although the irrigation system is gone, many of the trees planted by the settlers still thrive, defining the verdant core of the city. The Krenz-Kerley Trading Post in recent decades has often been called "the Old Mormon Laundry Building" (see, for example, Threinen 1981) because of its townsite location, its masonry (stone was a material favored by Mormon settlers in northern Arizona), and recollections of it as a laundry facility. However, research conducted to prepare this nomination indicates that the building was constructed more than a decade after the Mormon era ended in Tuba City and that it did not become a laundry until after World War II."

Today, it is the home of the Tuba City Public Library.

It is a one-story building built by Frederick D. Krenz as a trading post.

It includes some aspect of Colonial Revival style, somehow.

Other names: Building 78;Old Mormon Laundry Building Historic function: Commerce/trade; Government Historic subfunction: Department Store; Government Office

The Tuba Trading Post, across Main St. and down, is also listed on the National Register.
