= Tuba Trading Post =

- U.S. National Register of Historic Places
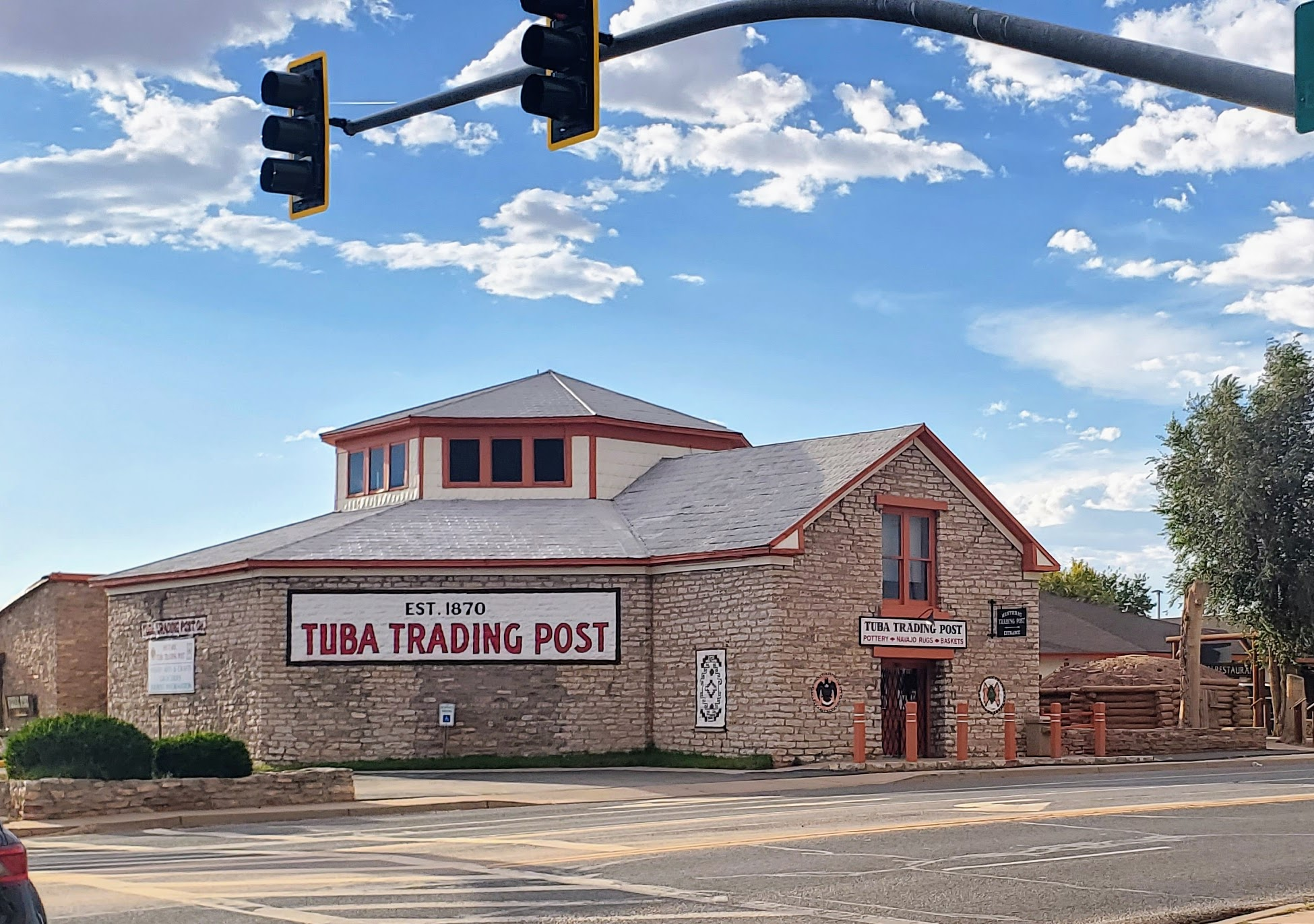
- Tuba Trading Post, 2022

- Location within Arizona
- Location: Jct. of Main and Moenave Sts., NW corner, Tuba City, Arizona
- Coordinates: 36.130217°N 111.240202°W
- Area: 2.4 acres (0.97 ha)
- Built: 1891, 1905, other
- Built by: Charles H. Algert; Oscar Dietzman
- Architectural style: Mixed (more than two styles from different periods), octagonal
- NRHP reference No.: 96001362
- Added to NRHP: November 29, 1996

The Tuba Trading Post, in Tuba City, Arizona, is a building complex which was started in 1891 by trader Charles H. Algert as a two-room shed built of native limestone. It is a mostly stone building made up of segments of different styles. It was listed on the National Register of Historic Places in 1996.

East of the initial two-room shed is an octagonal building, built in 1905 by Oscar Dietzman for trader Samuel S. Preston. Its foundation and walls were built of native blue limestone from Moenkopi Wash. Construction involved cement mortar mixing powered by horses, in a circular vat on-site. The building has a second story clerestory.

West of the shed is a two-room living quarters space, built of the same native limestone as the octagon and shed, which was added in 1927.

Also on the property is a traditional Navajo-style hogan built with peeled logs and an earthen roof in 1985. It was erected as a tourist attraction in a small yard northeast of the octagon. It was deemed non-contributing in the National Register listing.

It is located at 10 N. Main St., at the northwest corner of the intersection of Main and Moenave Streets.

It "is located on the only private land inholding within Tuba City, a spring-fed oasis on the western Navajo Indian Reservation."

The Krenz-Kerley Trading Post is another historic building nearby, at 78 N. Main St., and is also listed on the National Register.
