= Brannen-Devine House =

Historic house in Arizona, United States

- U.S. National Register of Historic Places
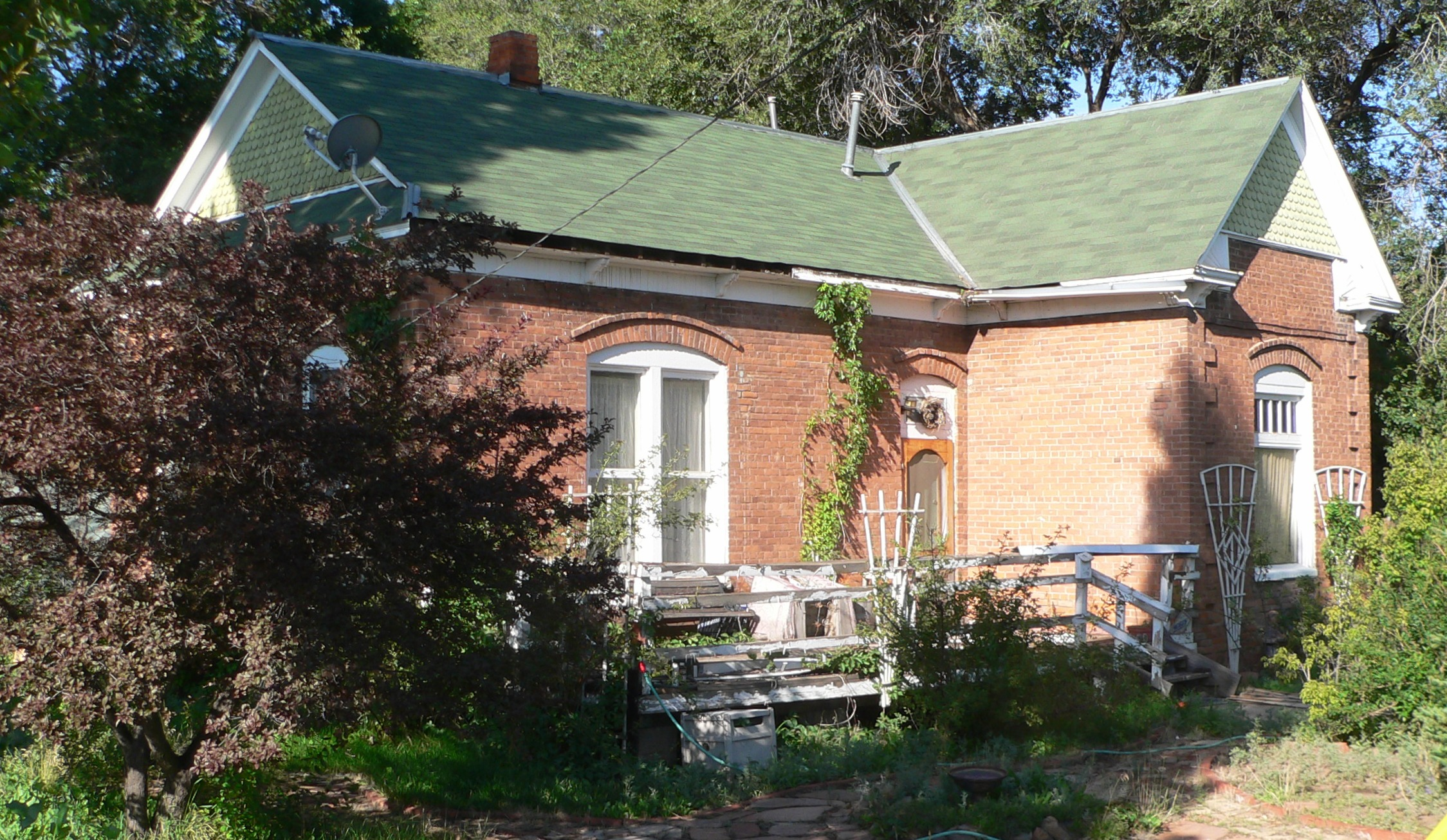

- Location within Arizona
- Location: 209 E. Cottage, Flagstaff, Arizona
- Coordinates: 35°11′41″N 111°38′51″W
- Area: less than one acre
- Built: 1892
- Architectural style: Queen Anne
- MPS: Flagstaff MRA
- NRHP reference No.: 86000912
- Added to NRHP: April 30, 1986

The Brannen-Devine House, at 209 E. Cottage in Flagstaff, Arizona, United States, was built in 1892. It was listed on the National Register of Historic Places in 1986.

It is a 30 by 40 feet (9.1 m × 12.2 m) brick house built upon a stone foundation, vernacular Queen Anne in style.

It was originally a home of Flagstaff pioneer J.M. Brannen in 1892. It was home during 1903 to 1908 for Thomas Devine, an engineer for the Arizona Lumber and Timber Co.

It was deemed significant as a "good representative of the Queen Anne Cottage style, [exemplifying] the design characteristics of this simple, locally popular form."

It also was an anchor of the 1884-created Brannen Addition neighborhood; a P.J. Brannen was the first merchant in Flagstaff to move from the "Old Town" to the "New Town" here.

In 2021, it is available for rental through Airbnb.
