= The Ice House (Flagstaff, Arizona) =

Historic building in Flagstaff, Arizona, United States

- U.S. National Register of Historic Places
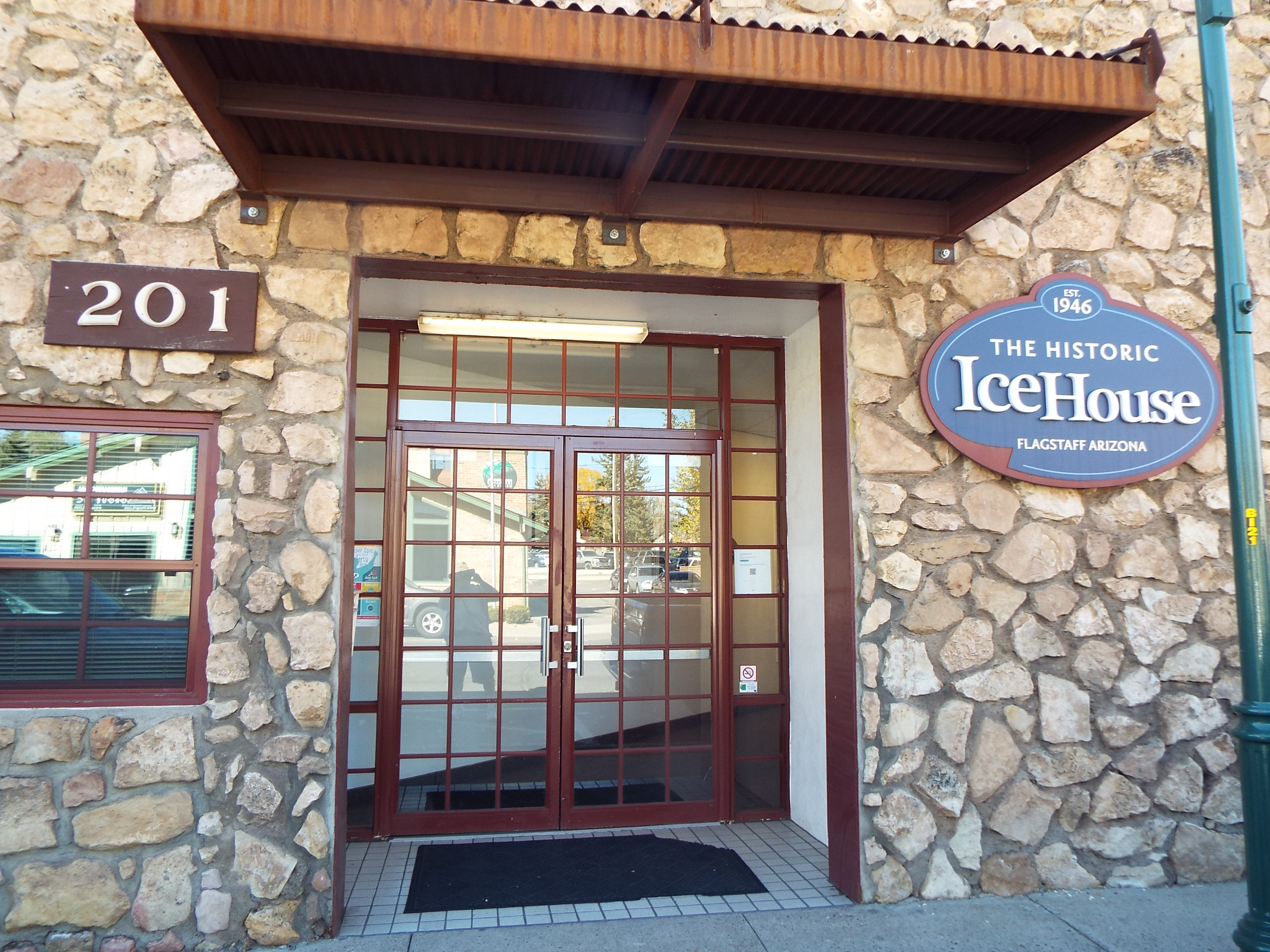

- Location within Arizona
- Location: 201 East Birch Avenue, Flagstaff, Arizona, U.S.
- Coordinates: 35.19828°N 111.64568°W
- Area: 1 acre (0.40 ha)
- Built: 1946; 80 years ago
- Architect: H. H. Green
- Architectural style: Stone construction
- NRHP reference No.: 09000174
- Added to NRHP: April 8, 2009

The Ice House, also known as Babbitt's Ice Plant, is a historical commercial building made of stone, built in 1946 and located at 201 East Birch Avenue in Flagstaff, Arizona. It was listed on the National Register of Historic Places in 2009.

== History ==
The Ice House was built by or for the Babbitt Brothers to be a large ice house for manufacture, storage, and sale of ice. The building was finished in 1946, right after World War II, and it was the first commercial building during that time period. It opened for operations in August 1947. Its walls are built of Kaibab Limestone, a stone that is found locally, and it is the only building of this type in the city of Flagstaff.

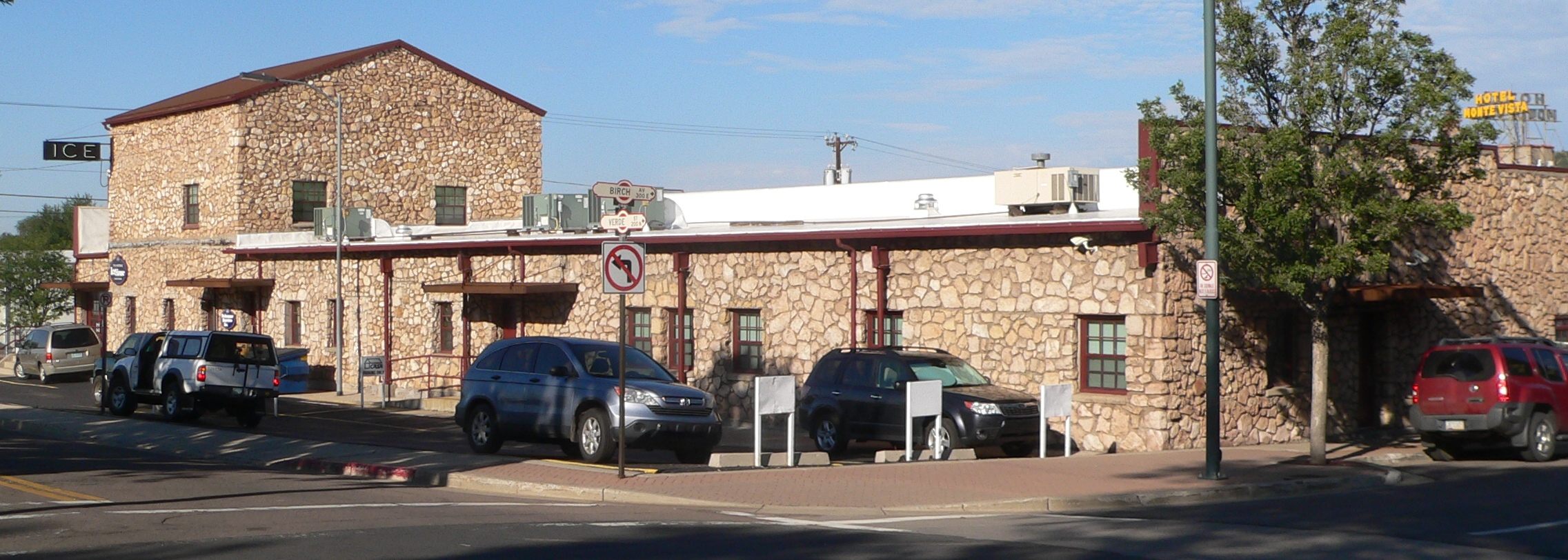
The Ice House's on North Verde Street, in 2012

It is an important building because of its role in early commercial business growth in the city. Trains, and trucks on route 66 would stop to purchase ice before continuing their travels, and it served as a regional hub.

After the ice business closed around 1950, the building turned into a grocery store and later into a distribution warehouse.

== See also ==
- National Register of Historic Places listings in Coconino County, Arizona
