= Ice House (Moulton, Alabama) =

Historic place in Alabama, United States

- U.S. National Register of Historic Places
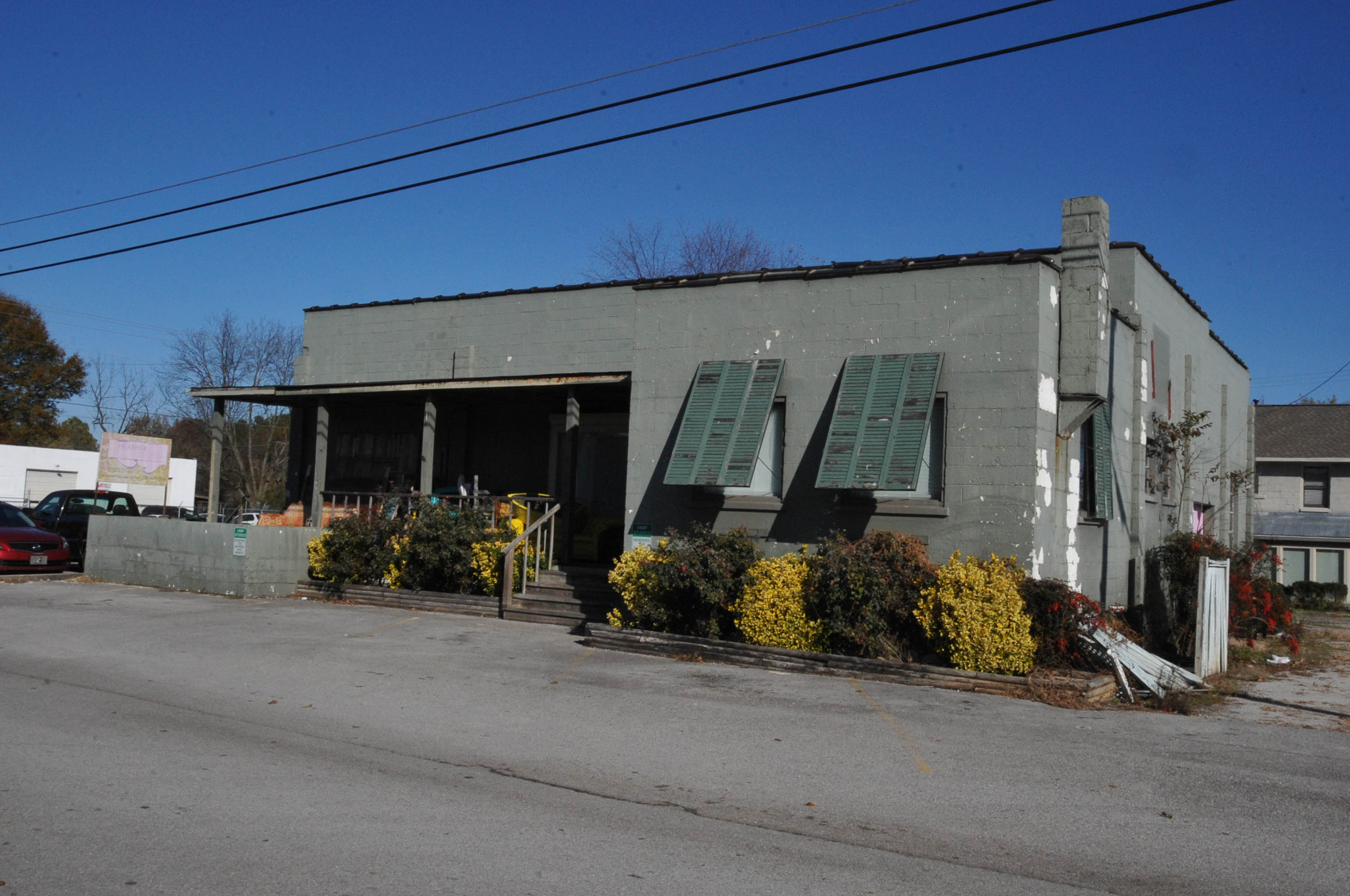
- The building in May 2008

- Location within Alabama Location within the United States
- Location: 844 Seminary St., Moulton, Alabama
- Coordinates: 34°28′56″N 87°17′24″W
- Area: less than one acre
- Architectural style: One story commercial block
- NRHP reference No.: 00000712
- Added to NRHP: June 22, 2000

The Ice House is a historic commercial building in Moulton, Alabama. It was built in 1946 at the beginning of Moulton's post-World War II boom period. After the town's previous ice house on the courthouse square was demolished to make way for new construction, R. W. Carter built a new ice house one block from the square with state-of-the-art ice making equipment. The ice house operated until 1977, serving homes and businesses in and around Moulton, as well as customers including Legion Field in Birmingham and the Browns Ferry Nuclear Power Plant across the Tennessee River. Today, the building houses an antique store, but the icemaking equipment is still intact. The building is a one-story, concrete block structure with a parapet roof. The façade has three original wood doors which originally enclosed the ice storage rooms, an entry door, and a window, all under a flat canopy. An office with two windows also projects from the façade. A concrete block residence constructed at the same time as the ice house sits behind the structure. The building was listed on the National Register of Historic Places in 2000.
