= Baaj Nwaavjo I'tah Kukveni – Ancestral Footprints of the Grand Canyon National Monument =

U.S. national monument in Arizona

- IUCN category V (protected landscape/seascape)
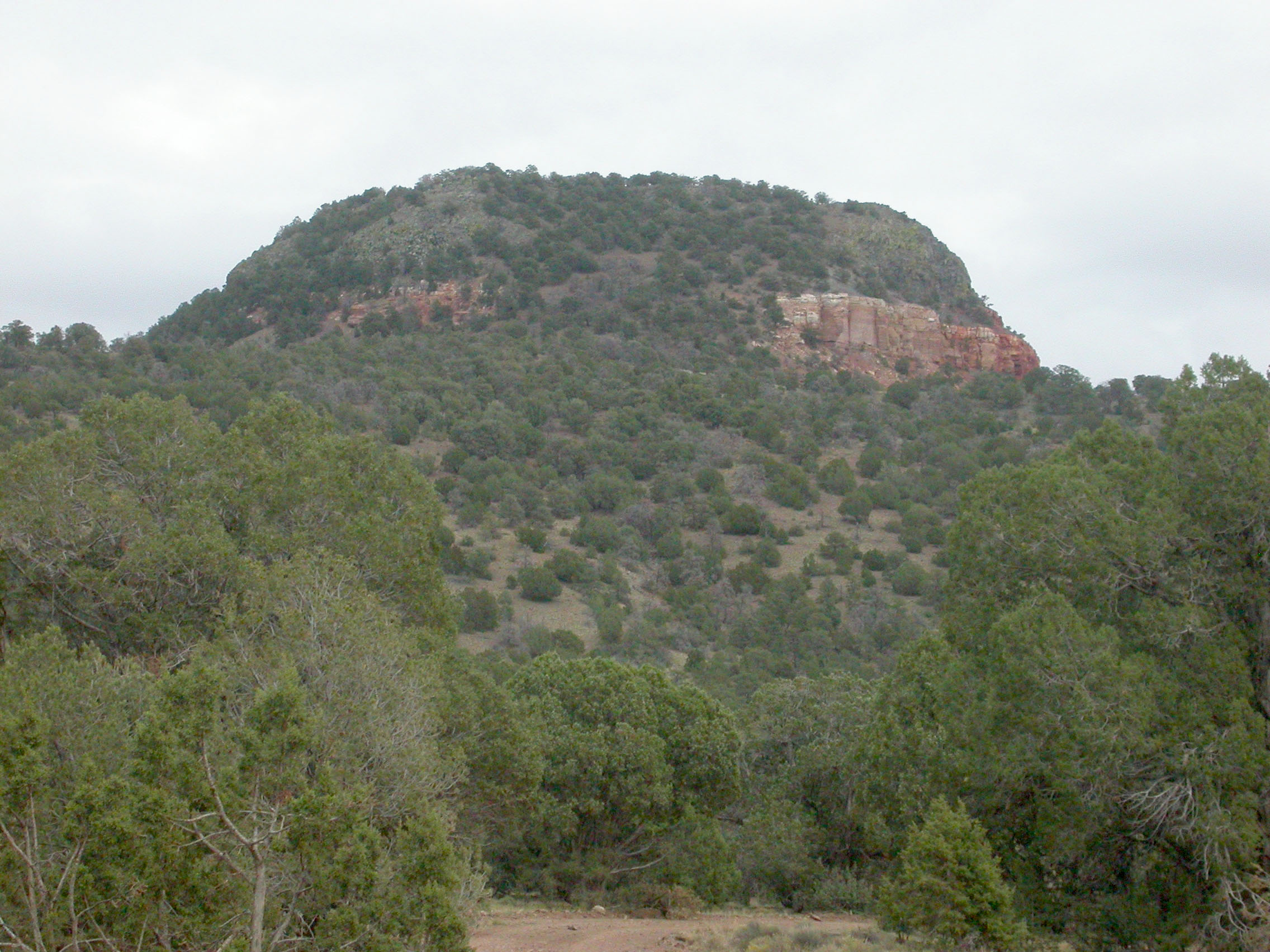
- Red Butte
- Interactive map of Baaj Nwaavjo I'tah Kukveni – Ancestral Footprints of the Grand Canyon National Monument
- Location: Coconino and Mohave Counties, Arizona, United States
- Nearest city: Tusayan, Arizona
- Coordinates: 35°54′N 112°00′W
- Area: 917,618 acres (3,713.47 km^{2})
- Established: August 8, 2023
- Governing body: United States Forest Service, Bureau of Land Management
- Website: https://www.blm.gov/national-conservation-lands/arizona/ancestral-footprints https://www.fs.usda.gov/r03/kaibab/newsroom/stories/preserving-sacred-ancestral-lands

Baaj Nwaavjo I'tah Kukveni – Ancestral Footprints of the Grand Canyon National Monument is a United States national monument that protects over 900,000 acres (3,600 km^{2}) surrounding the Grand Canyon in northern Arizona. President Joe Biden established it as a monument under the authority of the Antiquities Act on August 8, 2023, to be managed by the United States Forest Service within Kaibab National Forest and the Bureau of Land Management as part of the National Conservation Lands. While the area was already protected from most development, the monument designation made permanent a 20-year moratorium on new uranium mining put in place in 2012. The name combines the Havasupai words for "where tribes roam" and Hopi words for "our ancestral footprints", and many sites are considered sacred to the peoples who have lived in the region since time immemorial.

== Geography and features ==
The national monument includes three large segments: to the south of Grand Canyon National Park, the 388,376 acres (1,571.70 km^{2}) entire Tusayan Ranger District of the Kaibab National Forest; to the northeast, 529,242 acres (2,141.77 km^{2}) of Bureau of Land Management (BLM) lands south of Vermilion Cliffs National Monument and east of the forest's North Kaibab Ranger District, including House Rock Valley; and to the northwest, BLM lands west of the North Kaibab Ranger District and south of the Kaibab Indian Reservation on the Kanab Plateau, including part of Kanab Creek Wilderness. It excludes state and private lands within the outer boundaries of each section.

The total area of 917,618 acres (3,713.47 km^{2}) is smaller than the 1,069,970 acres (4,330.0 km^{2}) proposed in legislation. The monument spans a range of elevations across the Colorado Plateau and its ecosystems include the Mojave Desert; Great Basin grasslands, woodlands, and scrublands; and subalpine conifer forests and grasslands. It protects significant aquifer and watershed resources that feed the Colorado River, including the Kanab Creek.

It includes four areas of critical environmental concern: Moonshine Ridge, Kanab Creek, Johnson Spring, and Marble Canyon.

The monument includes more than 3,000 historic and cultural sites. These include cliff dwellings, petroglyphs, building remnants, troves of pottery, and sites with ancient stone tools. Sites on the National Register of Historic Places include the Hull Cabin Historic District, Red Butte Airfield, Grandview Lookout Tower and Cabin, and Moqui Ranger Station.

The Arizona Trail passes through the southern segment of the monument.

== Protection ==
The area was first protected as part of the Grand Canyon Forest Reserve in 1893. It became a national forest in 1907 and was later organized as Kaibab National Forest. The first Grand Canyon National Monument, established in 1908 by President Theodore Roosevelt, became Grand Canyon National Park in 1919. A second Grand Canyon National Monument was created in 1932 and later incorporated into the park.

Native American tribes and conservationists have advocated for greater protections in the region for many years. The Grand Canyon Tribal Coalition includes the Havasupai, Hopi, Hualapai, Kaibab Paiute, Moapa Band of Paiutes of Southern Nevada, Las Vegas Band of Paiute, Paiute Indian Tribe of Utah, Navajo Nation, San Juan Southern Paiute Tribe, Yavapai–Apache Nation, Pueblo of Zuni, and the Colorado River Indian Tribes.

In 2012, President Barack Obama's Interior Secretary Ken Salazar issued a moratorium on new uranium mining claims in the region surrounding the Grand Canyon, effective until 2032. The area includes 1.3% of U.S. uranium reserves, as well as many abandoned mines that may pose risks to water quality.

=== National monument designation ===
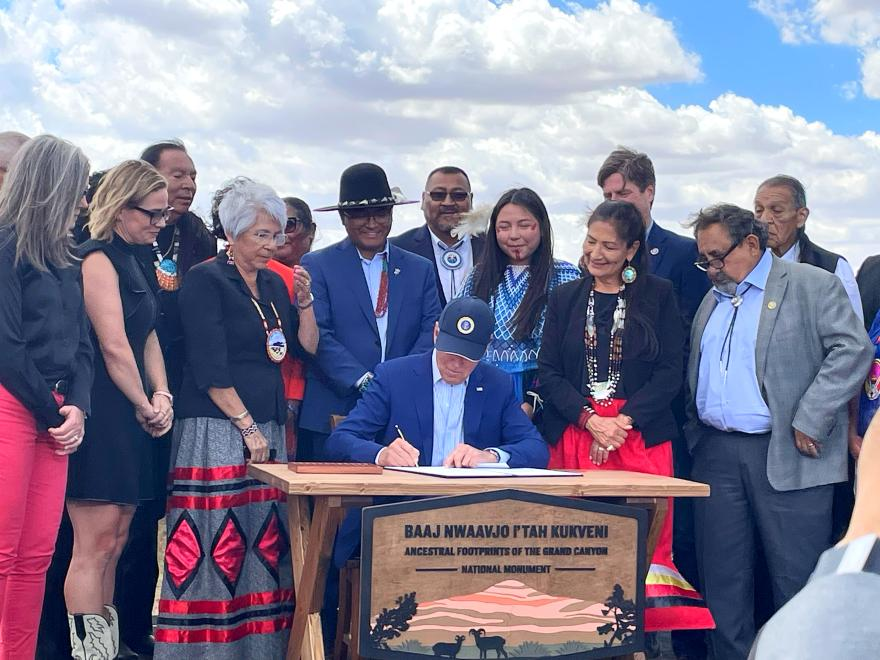
President Biden established the National Monument. The signing event brought together state politicians and tribal community leaders.

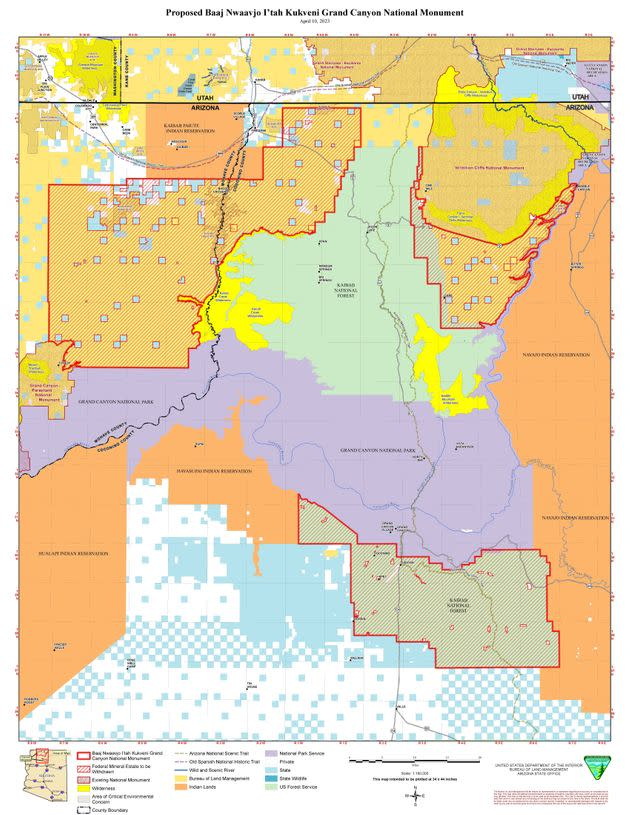
Map of proposal

Congressman Raúl Grijalva and Senator Kyrsten Sinema called for the creation of the monument and introduced bills to do so in July 2023. Secretary of the Interior Deb Haaland visited the Grand Canyon with Grijalva and Sinema's staff in May.

President Joe Biden visited Arizona on August 8, 2023 and issued a proclamation establishing the monument near Red Butte in its southern portion. Event attendees included Grijalva, Sinema, Haaland, Arizona Governor Katie Hobbs, Arizona Secretary of State Adrian Fontes, Deputy Secretary of Agriculture Xochitl Torres Small, Congressman Greg Stanton, and tribal representatives. It was Biden's fifth national monument designation, coming just two weeks after that of Emmett Till and Mamie Till-Mobley National Monument. Similar to the nearby Avi Kwa Ame National Monument in Nevada, the monument will include tribal leaders in its management. The act is part of President Biden's 30 by 30 conservation goals.

The designation permanently prevents new mining claims within the monument, though there are over 3,000 pre-existing leases that could still be developed. The Pinyon Plain Mine near Tusayan, which started development before the 2012 moratorium, began operations in December 2023. Uranium mining companies and some Republicans opposed the monument designation.

Management of the monument will be in cooperation with Tribal nations, including a monument commission made up of Tribal leaders and an advisory committee with a variety of stakeholders.

In February 2024, legislative Republicans in Arizona filed a lawsuit challenging the monument, alleging that it is too large and will unduly limit mining and ranching. A federal judge rejected the case and ruled that the plaintiffs lacked standing to sue in January 2025, a decision upheld by the federal appeals court in March 2026.

== In popular culture ==
In 2023, Native reggae rock band Tha 'Yoties had a free national tour in celebration of the monument's designation.

== See also ==
- List of national monuments of the United States
