= Hull Cabin Historic District =

Historic district in Arizona, United States

- U.S. National Register of Historic Places
- U.S. Historic district
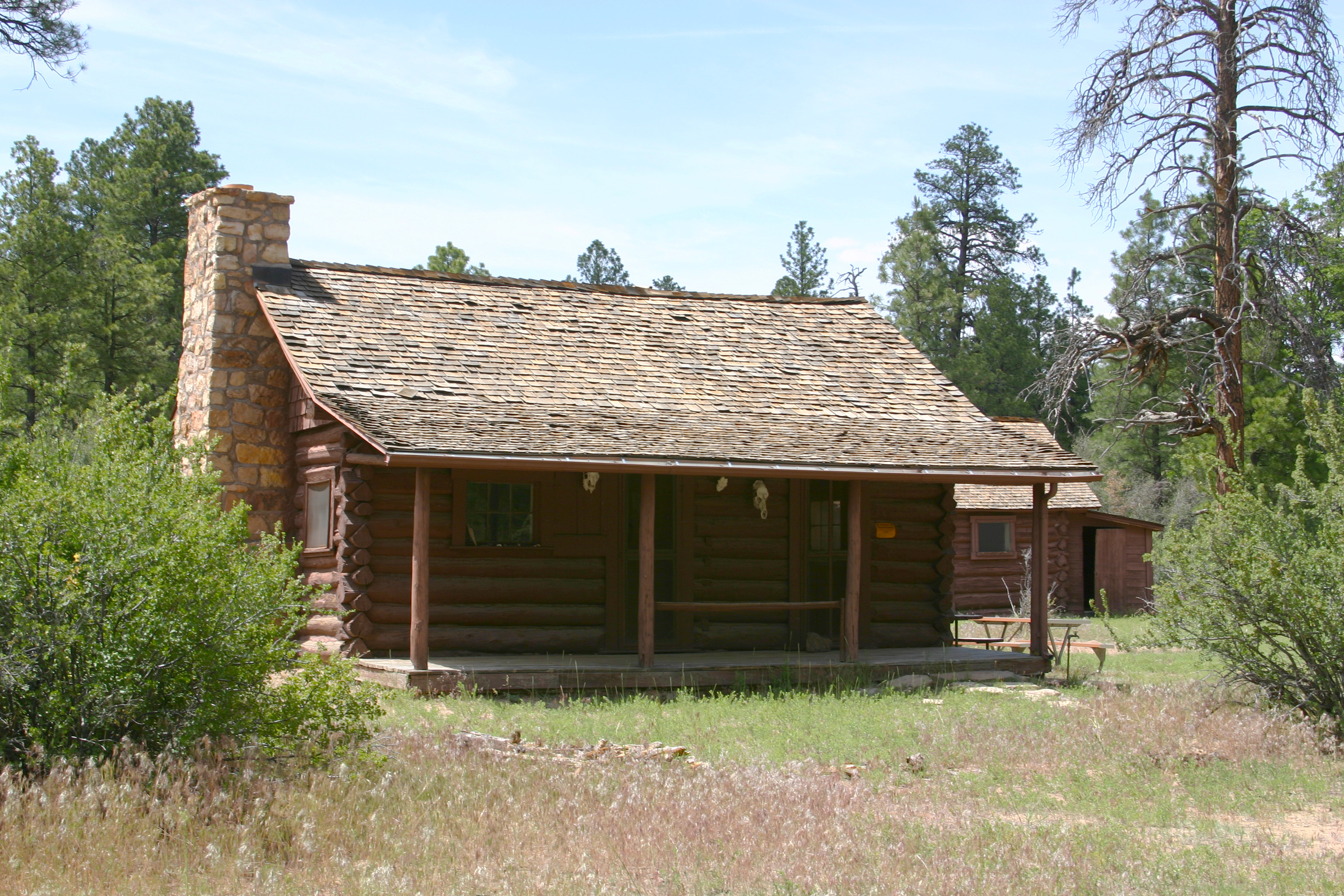
- Hull Cabin

- Location within Arizona Location within the United States
- Nearest city: Grand Canyon South Rim, Arizona
- Coordinates: 35°58′4.9″N 111°56′46.23″W
- Area: 35 acres (14 ha)
- Built: 1890
- Built by: William Hull
- Architectural style: Log Cabin
- NRHP reference No.: 85003370
- Added to NRHP: October 23, 1985

The Hull Cabin was built in the late 1880s near the South Rim of the Grand Canyon by settler William Hull. The Hull family arrived in the area in 1880 and established a ranch in the area, raising sheep and building the Hull Tank, a large earth-banked reservoir for their stock. The Hulls branched out into prospecting and were among the first to take in tourists heading to the Grand Canyon.

In 1893 the lands surrounding the Hull property were designated the Grand Canyon Forest Reserve. At some point after 1893 Hull left the area, and the cabins became property of the Department of the Interior. The cabin site was located near the somewhat boundary between Grand Canyon National Monument and Coconino National Forest, and at various times was considered to be within either property. However, on February 21, 1907 the cabin and its dependencies were transferred to Coconino National Forest, becoming the Hull Tank Ranger Station. In 1910 the cabin became the Hull Tank Ranger Station, the headquarters for Tusayan National Forest, which was created from Coconino. The forest managed the Grand Canyon area until the creation of the national park in 1919, working from the Hull Cabin in summer and from Anita, Arizona in the winter. Tusayan was incorporated into Kaibab National Forest in 1934., and the cabin became the headquarters of the Tusayan District until 1940, when operations were moved to the Moqui Ranger Station near Tusayan. The cabin's rear extension was added at that time, and probably the stone living room chimney. A 1950 proposal was advanced to include the area around the Hull Cabin in Grand Canyon National Park, but the idea was never pursued.

== Description ==
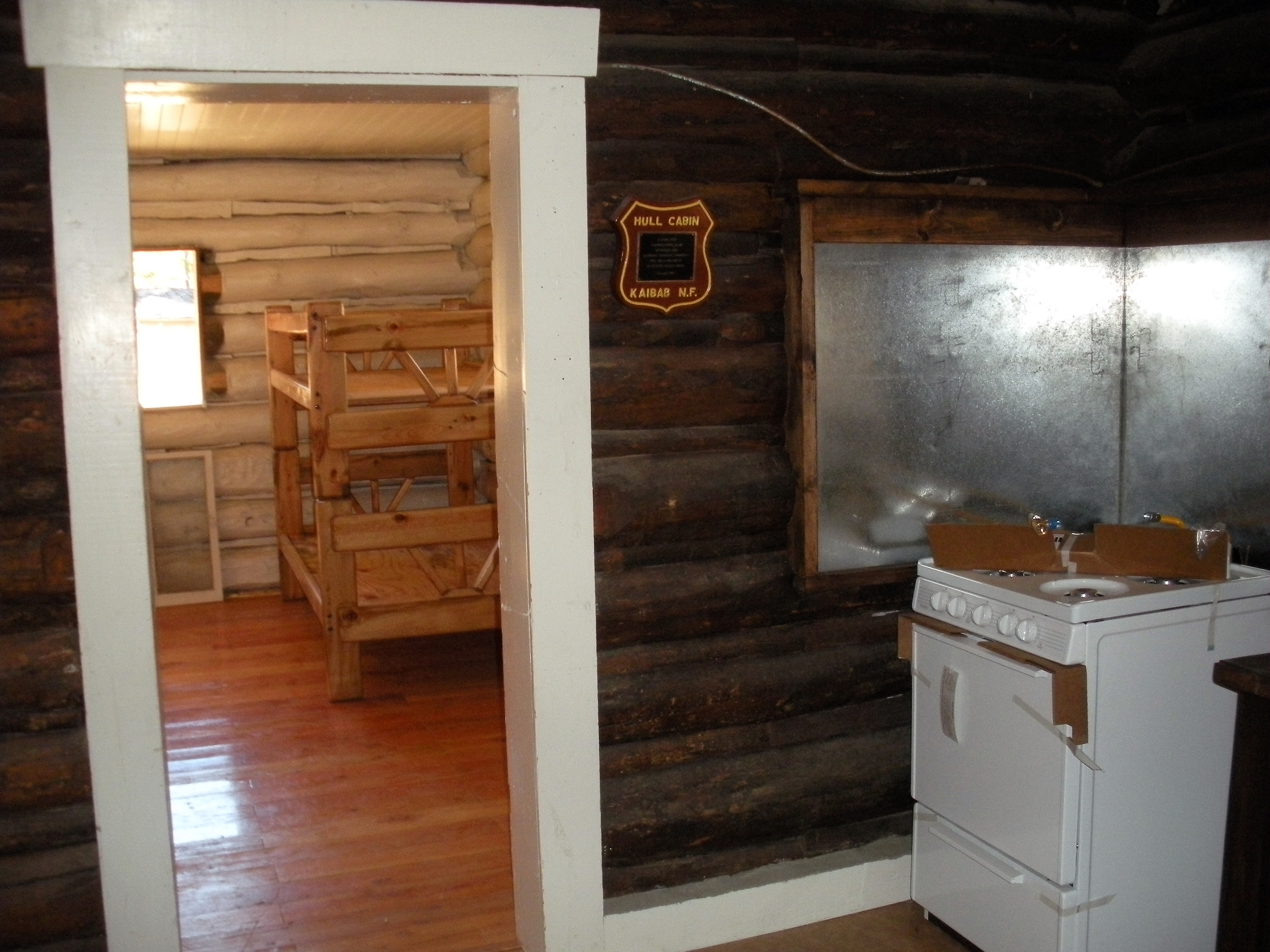
Interior of the Hull Cabin

The small historic district includes the Hull Cabin, a storage cabin, a barn, a root cellar, and the Hull Tank. The Hull Cabin is constructed of round Ponderosa pine logs, V-notched at the corners. In construction the cabin resembles the Buckey O'Neill Cabin at the South Rim. The cabin rests on a Coconino sandstone foundation. It measures 37 feet (11 m) by 27 feet (8.2 m), arranged in a main block with a shed-roofed porch along the front and a perpendicularly gabled ell extending to the rear. The front section comprises a kitchen and a living room, with the bedroom to the rear. The storage cabin measures 16 feet (4.9 m) by 18 feet (5.5 m), and is constructed to match the main cabin. It comprises a single concrete-floored room. A root cellar near the storage cabin has collapsed.

The barn is a 22-foot (6.7 m) by 26-foot (7.9 m) dovetailed log structure on a sandstone slab foundation. The roof is corrugated metal and the floor is dirt. Hull Tank is located about 1,500 feet (460 m) to the southeast of the main cabin. Built in 1888 by William and Philip Hull, it measures about 200 feet (61 m) square and is 14 feet (4.3 m) deep, impounded with earth embankments. The Hull Tank Lookout Tree is nearby.

== Present use ==
The Hull Cabin has been renovated by the Forest Service in 1989-90 and may be rented by the public for overnight stays. It is close to the Grandview Lookout Tower, about 1 mile (1.6 km) from the South Rim at Grandview Point.

The Hull Cabin Historic District was listed on the National Register of Historic Places on October 25, 1985.
