= Moqui Ranger Station =

- U.S. National Register of Historic Places
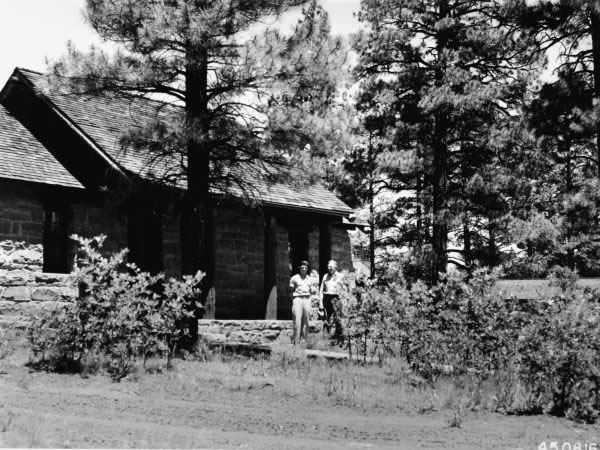
- Moqui Ranger Station, in 1948

- Location within Arizona Location within the United States
- Nearest city: Tusayan, Arizona
- Coordinates: 35°59′17″N 112°7′13″W
- Area: 2 acres (0.81 ha)
- Built: 1939
- Architect: USDA Forest Service
- Architectural style: Bungalow, Vernacular, Rustic
- MPS: Depression-Era USDA Forest Service Administrative Complexes in Arizona MPS
- NRHP reference No.: 93000521
- Added to NRHP: June 10, 1993

The Moqui Ranger Station in Kaibab National Forest near Tusayan, Arizona, also known as Tusayan Ranger Station, was built in 1939 by the Civilian Conservation Corps (CCC). It was listed on the National Register of Historic Places in 1993 for its architecture, which includes Bungalow architecture, Rustic architecture, vernacular and other styling. It was designed by the USDA Forest Service. The listing includes institutional housing and government office space in six contributing buildings and one other contributing structure over 2 acres (0.81 ha) In addition to CCC labor, workers from the Works Progress Administration (WPA) may have also been involved in the ranger station construction. The station replaced the old Hull Tank Ranger Station.

== Description ==
The ranger station complex features stone construction with rustic wood details, mostly executed using log construction. Although designed by the U.S. Forest Service, the design of the complex is closely related to the National Park Service Rustic style that prevails at nearby Grand Canyon National Park, and may be the best example of the style in the Forest Service. Wall construction uses local sandstone, sheltered by wide eaves, with wood plank doors and wood sash windows. The complex consists of the ranger dwelling, a pump house, barn, garage, seed house and a ranger's office, all built in 1942.

A newer complex, built in the 1960s, is located a short distance away and is screened from the historic area.
