= Grandview Lookout Tower and Cabin =

NRHP site in Coconino County, Arizona

- U.S. National Register of Historic Places
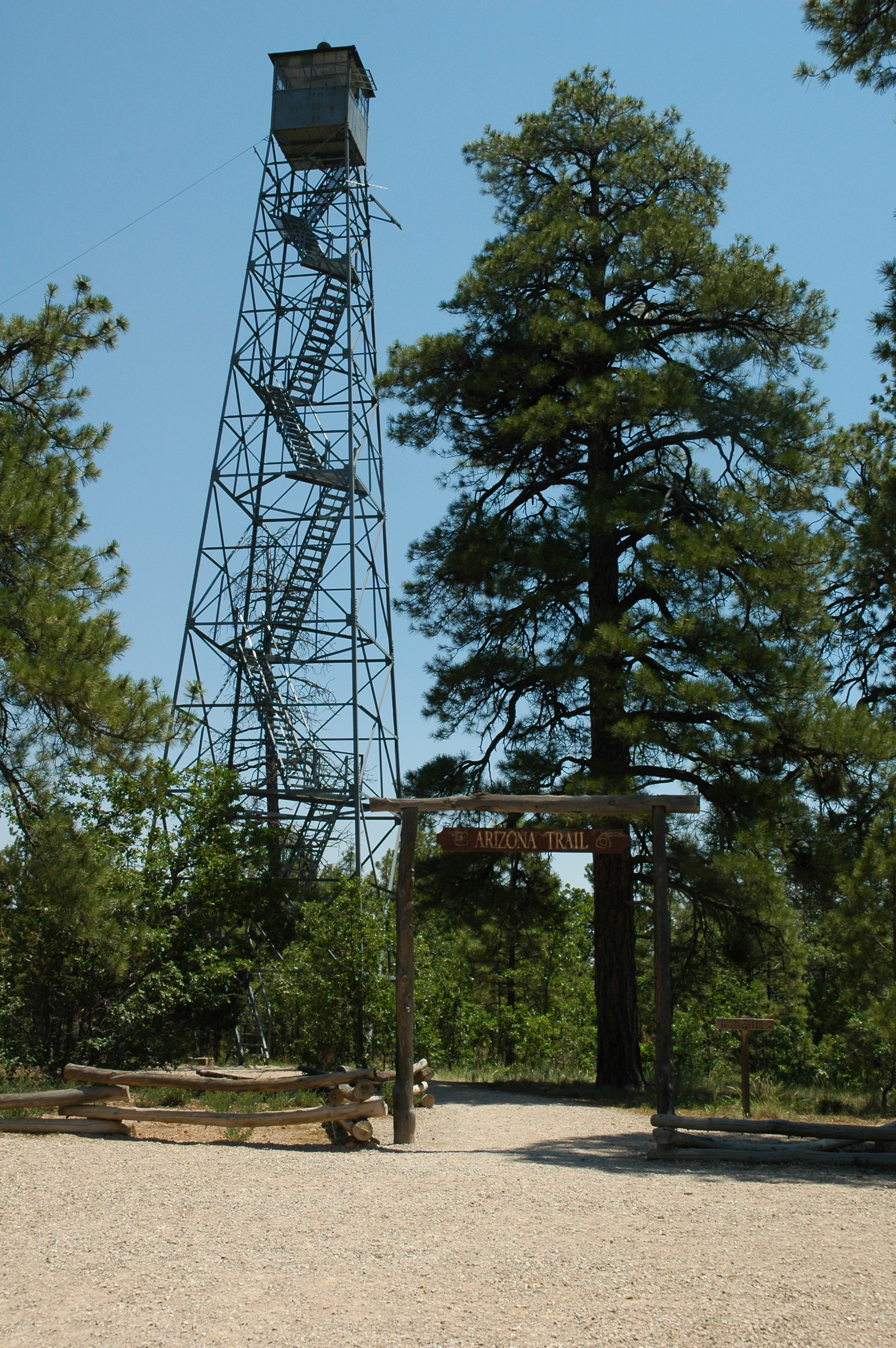

- Location within Arizona Location within the United States
- Location: Off Coconino Rim Rd., Twin Lakes, Arizona
- Coordinates: 35°57′28″N 111°57′17″W
- Area: less than one acre
- Built: 1936
- MPS: National Forest Fire Lookouts in the Southwestern Region TR
- NRHP reference No.: 87002482
- Added to NRHP: January 28, 1988

The Grand View Lookout Tower is a fire lookout in Kaibab National Forest near the South Rim of the Grand Canyon. The 80-foot (24 m) tall steel tower was built in the 1930s. Its observation cabin measures 7 feet (2.1 m) square. A small cabin is included in the designated area.

The Arizona Trail passes the tower. The Hull Cabin Historic District is nearby.

The Grandview Lookout Tower was placed on the National Register of Historic Places on January 28, 1988.
