= Apex, Arizona =

- Ghost town
- Location of Apex in Arizona Apex, Arizona (the United States)
- Coordinates: 35°56′35″N 112°11′09″W
- Country: United States
- State: Arizona
- County: Coconino
- Elevation: 6,590 ft (2,010 m)
- Time zone: UTC-7 (Mountain (MST))
  - Summer (DST): UTC-7 (MST)
- Area code: 928
- FIPS code: 04-02970
- GNIS feature ID: 25248

Apex was a lumber town on the Grand Canyon Railway situated in Coconino County, Arizona. Founded as company town on a wye on the Atlantic and Pacific Railroad, the community was dissolved when lumbering activity ceased in 1936.

== Geography ==
Apex was located near the junction of Forest Service Road 335 and the rail line.

== History ==
Apex was a company town founded on a spur track of the Atlantic and Pacific Railroad in the late 1920s by the Saginaw and Manistee Lumber Company of Arizona, which built a headquarters for their milling operations. In addition to the headquarters building, the community originally consisted of "seven houses perched on the east slope and seven more and the school on the west, along with two oil tanks and a water tank for the locomotives." There were also several sheds and other buildings used to service the train and support mill operations.

The houses in Apex rested on temporary foundations. The company maintained a commissary.

Men without families would typically live in camps moving with the cutting activity, while families lived in a community at Apex station. The settlement had its own school and telephone service. Many of the workers and their families were from Sweden and Norway. Lumber operations by the Saginaw and Manistee Lumber Company ended in 1936 and it was abandoned.

Apex School District #3 opened in fall 1929 in a boxcar converted into a one-room schoolhouse. The school at Apex, along with the neighboring one at the mining town of Anita, were at one time the only racially integrated schools in Arizona. The school never exceeded 15 pupils, and closed in spring 1936.

In May 1936, the community was disbanded when logging activities ceased. After removal, the houses were removed, leaving only the foundations. Shacks on boxcars were burned in bonfires. The schoolhouse was one of the last buildings in Apex; it, too, was removed.

Northern Arizona University maintains the Apex, Arizona Archaeology Project, educating the public on life in Apex during the Great Depression.

== See also ==
- Canyon Diablo, Arizona
