= XIT (band) =

Native American rock band

- Genres: Psychedelic rock; folk rock; progressive rock; pop rock
- Years active: 1968–2011
- Spinoff of: Lincoln St. Exit

XIT (Crossing of Indian Tribes) is a Native American rock band that released two albums in the 1970s on the Rare Earth label. The band consisted of members Mac Suazo, Michael Martinez, Lee Herrerra, and R.C. Garris, with Tom Bee acting as a producer and co-founder. Their music addresses themes of historic and contemporary Native American issues, resilience, and resistance. Their song "Reservation of Education" is about the residential school system, also known as the American Indian boarding schools.

Tom Bee belonged to the Diné (Najavo) tribe while bassist Jomac "Mac" Suezo was a member of the Taos Pueblo tribe. The band often incorporated the Navajo language into their songs, such as “Nihaa Shil Hozho (I Am Happy About You)” and “Reservation of Education”.

Their initial recording, 1972's Plight of the Redman, is a concept album with rock opera elements, telling "the story of Native life since the times of Columbus using traditional [symphonic] and electric sounds as well as chanting and Native language."

Due to XIT's criticism of governmental treatment of Native Americans and support of the American Indian Movement, the United States government and FBI took action to suppress their music. Circa 1972, they banned their first album from radio airplay and threatened Motown Records unless they defunded promotion of Plight of the Redman. Despite this, XIT toured Europe three times and opened for ZZ Top, Joe Cocker, Nitty Gritty Dirt Band, Steve Martin, Floyd Red Crow Westerman, Black Oak Arkansas, Three Dog Night, Rare Earth, Zephy, Buffy St. Marie, Redbone and the Beach Boys.

In 2007, the Encyclopedia of the Great Plains Indians described the band as "the first commercially successful all-Indian rock band."

== History ==
=== Predecessor ===
Lincoln St. Exit, a psychedelic rock garage band, was formed in June 1966, at Albuquerque, New Mexico's Valley High School. It was formed as a response to "intense racism" in New Mexico that made the state "a dangerous place to be Indian." The group consisted of musicians Siegi Chavez, Frank Viramontes, Paul Chapman, Michael Martinez, Mac Suazo, Larry Leyba, and Lee Herrera. They recorded their first LP, "Entrance," but the LP wasn’t released until 1974. In 1969, the members were Michael Martinez, Larry Leyba, Mac Suazo, and Lee Herrera. Larry Leyba was replaced by R.C. Gariss in 1970 and Lincoln St. Exit became Exit. In 1970, they recorded their only LP, "Drive It," which was released the following year.

=== Conception of XIT ===
Circa 1970, members A. Michael Martinez, Mac Suazo, Lee Herrerra, and R. C. Gariss lived together in a log cabin on the east side of the Sandia Mountains. Their band, then named Exit, was changed to XIT. Mac Suazo noticed an Exit sign at a bar where the band used to hang out and noticed the “E” was burned out, he then told everyone to look and pointed out that Xit should be the band's name, so they all agreed, band member and producer Tom Bee, XIT stands for "crossing of Indian Tribes." With the name change, the group decided to adopt a "more Native American image" through traditional clothing and instruments, namely a leather Taos drum set.

=== First album and FBI intervention ===
Around 1970, producers Mike Valvano and Ralph Terrana of Motown Records visited the cabin to see a rough draft performance of Plight of the Redman. Both were impressed, and Terrana promised a large promotional budget and claimed Motown was "hot for the album."

The rock opera follows a singular Native American's peaceful life that is destroyed by contact with colonists; it describes the destruction of his society and the desecration of American land. The album ends with a denunciation of present-day conditions, such as Native American suicide, poverty, diseases, and poor access to healthcare in the "ghettos of reservations." On Plight of the Redman, Martinez provided vocals and lead guitar; Suazo narrated and played bass guitar; Herrerra provided drums; and R. C. Gariss was the 2nd lead guitar. It features a chorus, orchestral instruments, guitar solos, and a recurring melodic theme throughout the album. Its spoken-word narration directly denounced the U.S. government's treatment of Native Americans, such as in the final song "End?":

Your America has not been the land of your proclaimed liberty and justice for all. May your God forgive you. The treatment of our people has been a national tragedy and disgrace. The time has come to put an end to that disgrace: [the occupation of] Alcatraz, Fort Lawton, whatever necessary. We must now manage our own affairs and control our own lives, and, through it all, remain to be the true American.

The United States government's goal to "stabilize American Indian uprisings," such as the Occupation of Alcatraz Island of 1969 to 1971, necessitated suppressing XIT and other Native American bands expressing radical messages. Despite the government's interpretation, Bee has stated, "I never felt our music to be militant. I never felt our music to be radical. I never felt our music [should] upset anybody, but to educate everybody."

Michael Martinez stated, "Our message was a political statement about how Natives were treated in the U.S. We affiliated ourselves with the American Indian Movement. We did a lot of their rallies. That was a detriment to us." Taking note of their resistance, the United States government banned their music from the radio.

According to Suazo, the FBI "told Motown to stop the album's promotion or face an IRS audit."

Meanwhile, after the album release, XIT toured the country, opening for ZZ Top, Joe Cocker, The Beach Boys, Three Dog Night, Zephyr, Redbone, Nitty Gritty Dirt Band, Steve Martin, Buffy St. Martin, Floyd Redcrow Westerman, Johnny Otis, Dewey Martin, Crow, and Black Oak Arkansas

=== Second album and European tour ===
Their second album, Silent Warrior (1973), resulted in a European hit single "We Live," which sold millions of units, according to Suazo. The lyrics continued to describe the Native American experience; for example, "Reservation of Education" describes internalized racism in Indian boarding schools. Among its lyrics, one stated, "I'm sure when you were young, you played a game called Cowboys and Indians...only now it's called White Man and Indian."

Despite success in Europe, Motown Records ended its relationship with the band, possibly under the persuasion of the United States government.

As a result of the single's success, XIT toured Europe three times in the early 1970s. This began with a performance in Venice during the Venice Biennale's Festival Internazionale di Musica Contemporanea (International Festival of Contemporary Music). Their performance was viewed by a TV audience of 30 million.

The most recent members of XIT were Willie Bluehouse Johnson (Lead guitar), P.J. West (Drums, percussion to include timpani), Louie Running Wolf (bass guitar), and Jim Boyd (lead guitar). Original Xit has released 6 CDs since 2006, "eXit From the REZ" (2006), "No eXit" (2007), "eXit nOw" (2008), "neXt eXit" (2009), "The Red Album" (2010) and "Forty Years" (2011). Obie Sullivan played keyboards 1971–1975.

=== Disbanding ===
By 1976, the group had disbanded.

On May 20, 2000, XIT reunited for their 30th anniversary at the Celebrity Palace in the Mystic Lake Casino in Prior Lake, Minnesota. Their stage performances featured dancers in ceremonial dress.

== Legacy ==
In 1999, the Native American Music Awards presented Tom Bee and XIT with the Lifetime Achievement Award.

In a 2000 documentary, Tom Bee's The SOAR Corporation claimed XIT "carried a message of unity, hope, and truth to Indian people across America. Their lyrics brought to the surface the injustice that has been, and continues to be, inflicted upon Native Americans. They not only brought rock and roll to Indian people; they brought Indian consciousness to the world through rock and roll."

In 2013, the original XIT lineup of A. Michael Martinez, Mac Suazo, R.C. Gariss, and Lee Herrera played for the very last time at the Shiprock Chapter House for a two-hour-long concert. The concert was produced by Chili Yazzie, a former XIT member, and videographer Flora Benn.

In 2016, the band was inducted into the New Mexico Hall of Fame.

Since 2020, reggae rock band Ed Kabotie and Tha 'Yoties have referred to XIT as their "musical heroes." Tha 'Yoties have performed and recorded covers of XIT songs, including The Silent Warrior's "Reservation of Education." In 2020, Tha 'Yoties held a tribute performance featuring 10 covers of XIT songs, live-streamed from the Orpheum Theater in Flagstaff, Arizona.

In 2012, the formation of blues rock band Blue Mountain Tribe was inspired by a PBS performance by XIT. Band member Hairston stated, "[XIT] didn’t play the flute, the drum; they got up there and just rocked."

In 2023, Mac Suazo died. He was survived by his daughter Martha and son Matthew. A group of current AIM members put on a tribute to honor him as a fallen warrior. A. Michael Martinez, Ed Kabotie, and William Johnson played some of XIT's most memorable songs to honor him.

== Albums ==
- Plight of the Redman, 1972 (Rare Earth 536)
- Silent Warrior, 1973 (Rare Earth 545)
- Entrance, 1974 (early work from the sixties as Lincoln Street Exit) (Canyon 7114)
- Color Me Red, 1976 (SOAR)
- Backtrackin', 1976 (Canyon 7115)
- Relocation, 1977 (Canyon 7121)
- Drums Across the Atlantic, 1985 (Recorded February 6, 1981 - The Tropica Club, Luzern, Switzerland) (Commander 39003)
- Without Reservation, 2002 (SOAR)
- eXit From the REZ, 2006
- No eXit, 2007
- eXit nOw, 2008
- neXt eXit, 2009
- Wanted Alive, 2009
- The Red Album, 2010
- Forty Years, 2011
