= Tha 'Yoties =

American reggae rock band

- Origin: Flagstaff, Arizona, U.S.
- Genres: Reggae rock

Tha 'Yoties, occasionally called Ed Kabotie and Tha 'Yoties, are a reggae rock band based in Flagstaff, Arizona.

According to band leader Ed Kabotie, Tha 'Yoties "bring awareness to the issues and cultures of tribes on the Colorado Plateau" by performing "reggae and classic rock, with an upbeat, danceable style." He has described it as edutainment and New Native Folk.

The band's music addresses such topics as the pollution of Navajo lands by abandoned uranium mines, the protection of cultural sites, and the colonization of the Americas. Kabotie states that they "play in a hopeful vibe, but also drop some bombs about injustice." For example, their song "Don't Worry, Be Hopi" (an allusion to Bobby Ferrin's 1988 single "Don't Worry, Be Happy") describes thousands of years of history of the Hopi sovereign nation.

Tha 'Yoties have had multiple performances and album recordings in Flagstaff's Orpheum Theatre. The band has performed and released multiple tributes to 1970s Native American rock band, XIT.

== Members ==
Band leader, main vocalist Ed Kabotie, is also a visual artist, educator, and lecturer. Kabotie describes himself as an "edutainer" from the Tewa Badger Clan and Hopi Snow Clan, and he routinely introduces himself in Hopi language. His grandfather is artist and muralist Fred Kabotie. He is from the Hopi village of Shungopavi (near Second Mesa, Arizona) and the Tewa village of Khap’o Owinge. His work addresses topics of "spirituality, cultural achievements, and social injustices including arsenic contaminations and water depletion." In 2016, Ed Kabotie was invited by the National Park Service to perform flute in the Grand Canyon National Park's Desert View Watchtower.

Musicians included band leader, Tewa and Hopi singer/songwriter Ed Kabotie; Dine/Dakota flautist Hunter Eagleman RedDay; Dine/Apache singer/songwriter Sage Bond from Red Lake on the Navajo Nation; Andrew Baker on drums; and Alec Tippett on lead guitar.

== Etymology ==
Kabotie has stated that the 'Yoties is short for coyotes; the band is "howling for the people and lands of the Colorado Plateau," although they "also cover [their] favorite classic rock bands like Steve Miller and Led Zeppelin."

== Performances ==
On June 23, 2018, they performed in the Dolores, Colorado's River Brewery to fundraise for the Southwest Colorado Canyons Alliance. The same year, they also were featured at the Hopi Festival of Arts and Culture, and Kabotie was the artist in residence at the Museum of Northern Arizona.

=== 2022 tour ===
Their national Xoyote Soldier Tour began in Flagstaff June 8, 2022. It stopped in New Mexico, Colorado, Kansas, Minnesota, Indiana, Oklahoma and California at reservations, museums and educational institutions.

=== 2023 tour ===
Their 2023 tour was free of charge in support of the Baaj Nwaavjo I'tah Kukveni National Monument.

On September 20, 2023, Tha 'Yoties featured a presentation and performance titled “Alter-Native History” incorporating visual arts and music. That evening, the Copper Mountain College Alumni Association hosted Howlin’ at the Mountain, a "funky Yotie party."

On November 23, 2019, Tha 'Yoties performed a tribute to Native American rock band XIT at the Museum of Northern Arizona.

In 2023, Tha' Yoties performed at the National Museum of the American Indian's Native Voices of the Grand Canyon. This event was also MCed by Kabotie. Other performers were singer and flutist Ryon Polequaptewa; seven-time world champion hoop dancer, Derrick Davis (Hopi/Choctaw); and Havasupai traditional songs led by elders and a special Supai delegation including Red Rock Foundation president Carletta Tilousi.
