= Tusayan Ruins =

Archaeological site in Arizona, United States

- U.S. National Register of Historic Places
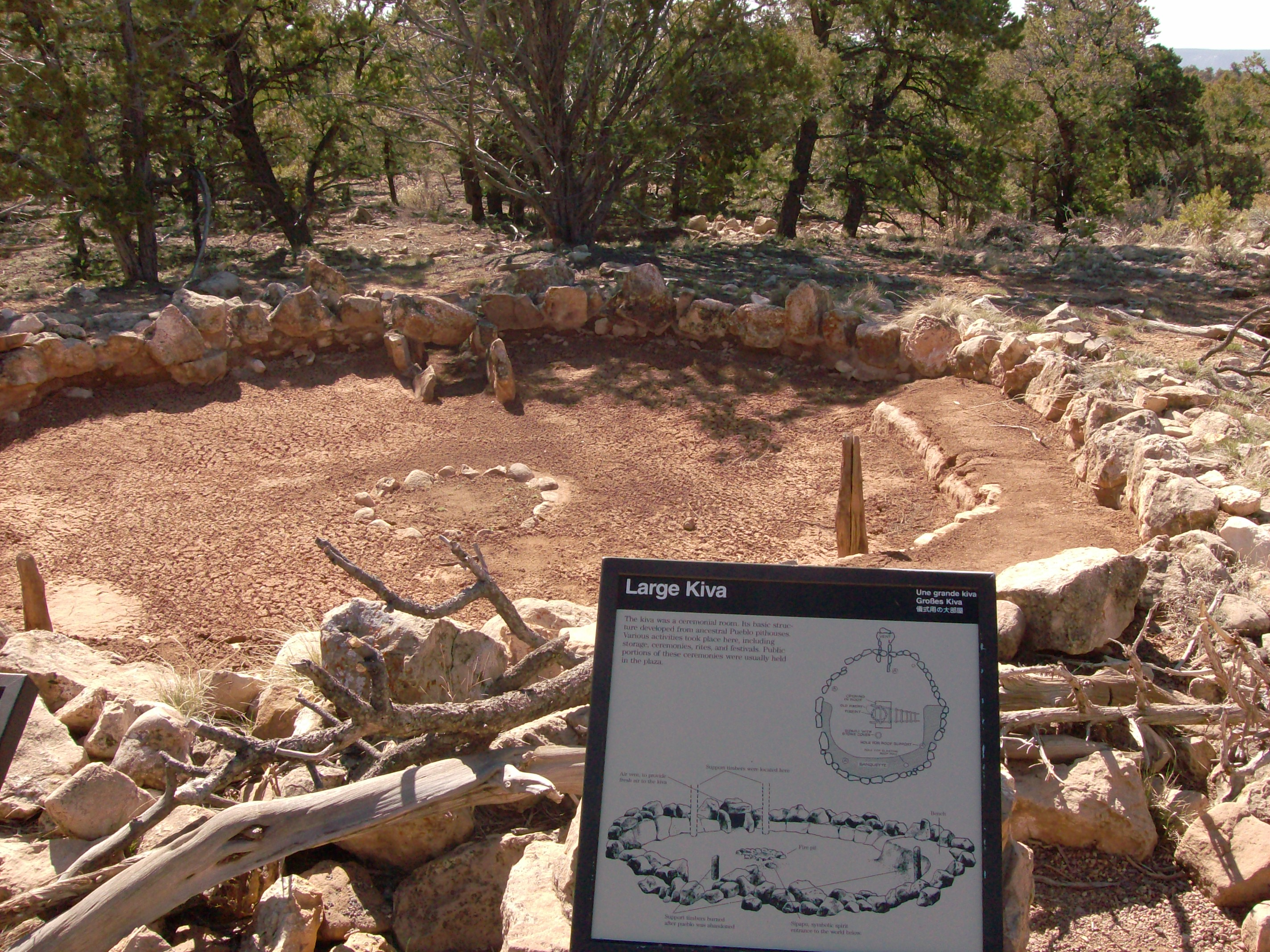
- A kiva at the pueblo ruins

- Location within Arizona Location within the United States
- Nearest city: Grand Canyon National Park, Arizona, United States
- Coordinates: 36°0′49″N 111°51′56″W
- Built: 1200
- Architectural style: Pueblo
- NRHP reference No.: 74000285
- Added to NRHP: July 10, 1974

The Tusayan Ruins (aka Tusayan Pueblo) is an 800-year-old Pueblo Indian site located within Grand Canyon National Park, and is considered by the National Park Service (NPS) to be one of the major archeological sites in Arizona. The site consists of a small, u-shaped pueblo featuring a living area, storage rooms, and a kiva. Tree ring studies indicate that the site was occupied for about twenty years, beginning around 1185. It is found on the Desert View Drive portion of Arizona State Route 64, 3 miles west of the Desert View Watchtower. The site was listed on the National Register of Historic Places in 1974.

The site was excavated in 1930 by members of the Gila Pueblo of Globe, Arizona. Preservation work took place in 1948 and 1965. The site represents the survival of an isolated Pueblo II culture into the Pueblo III era.

The Tusayan Ruin and Museum is a NPS interpreted location, which includes a trail from the museum thru part of the ruin. Tours may be ranger lead or self-guided. The Tusayan Museum was built in 1928 to a design by National Park Service architect Herbert Maier and sponsored by Laura Spelman Rockefeller as a trailside museum. It was expanded in 1934, and represents an interpretation of a Hopi structure.

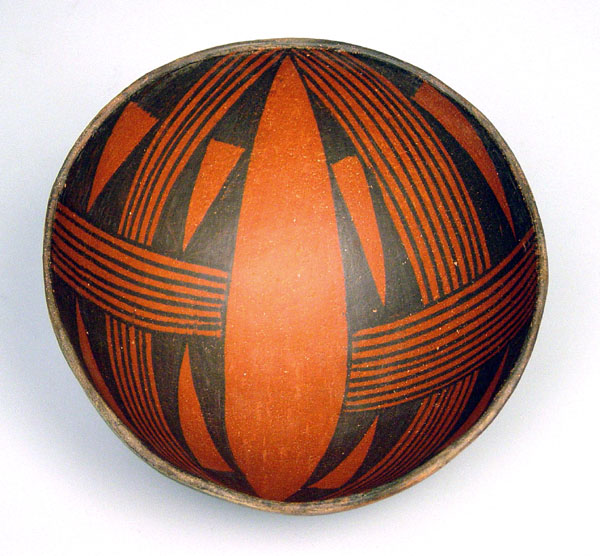
Tusayan black on red bowl, ca. 1050-1150 AD, likely from Tusayan ruin. Grand Canyon National Park Museum

== See also ==
- Tusayan National Forest
