= Sycamore Canyon Wilderness =

Protected area in northern Arizona

- IUCN category Ib (wilderness area)
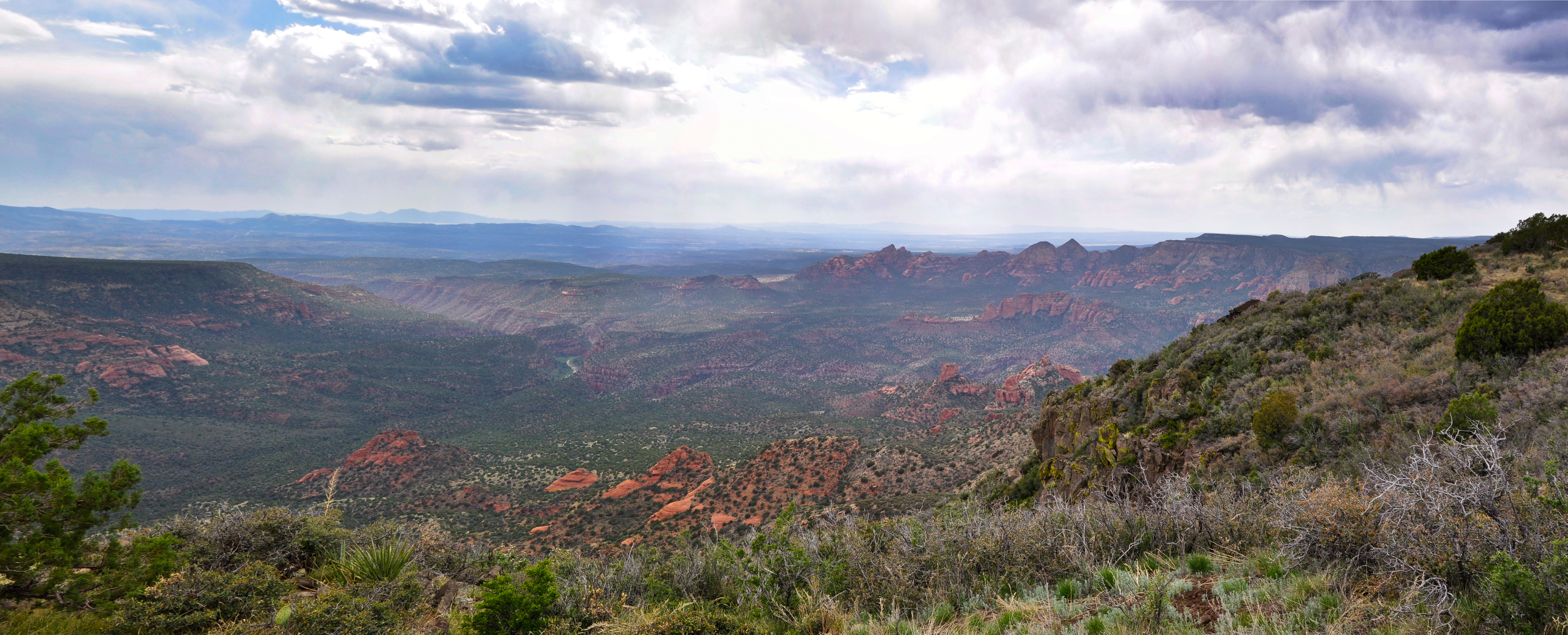

- Location within the United States Location within Arizona
- Location: Coconino and Yavapai counties, Arizona, United States
- Nearest city: Clarkdale
- Coordinates: 34°59′17″N 111°59′18″W
- Area: 55,937 acres (22,637 ha)
- Established: 1972
- Governing body: U.S. Forest Service

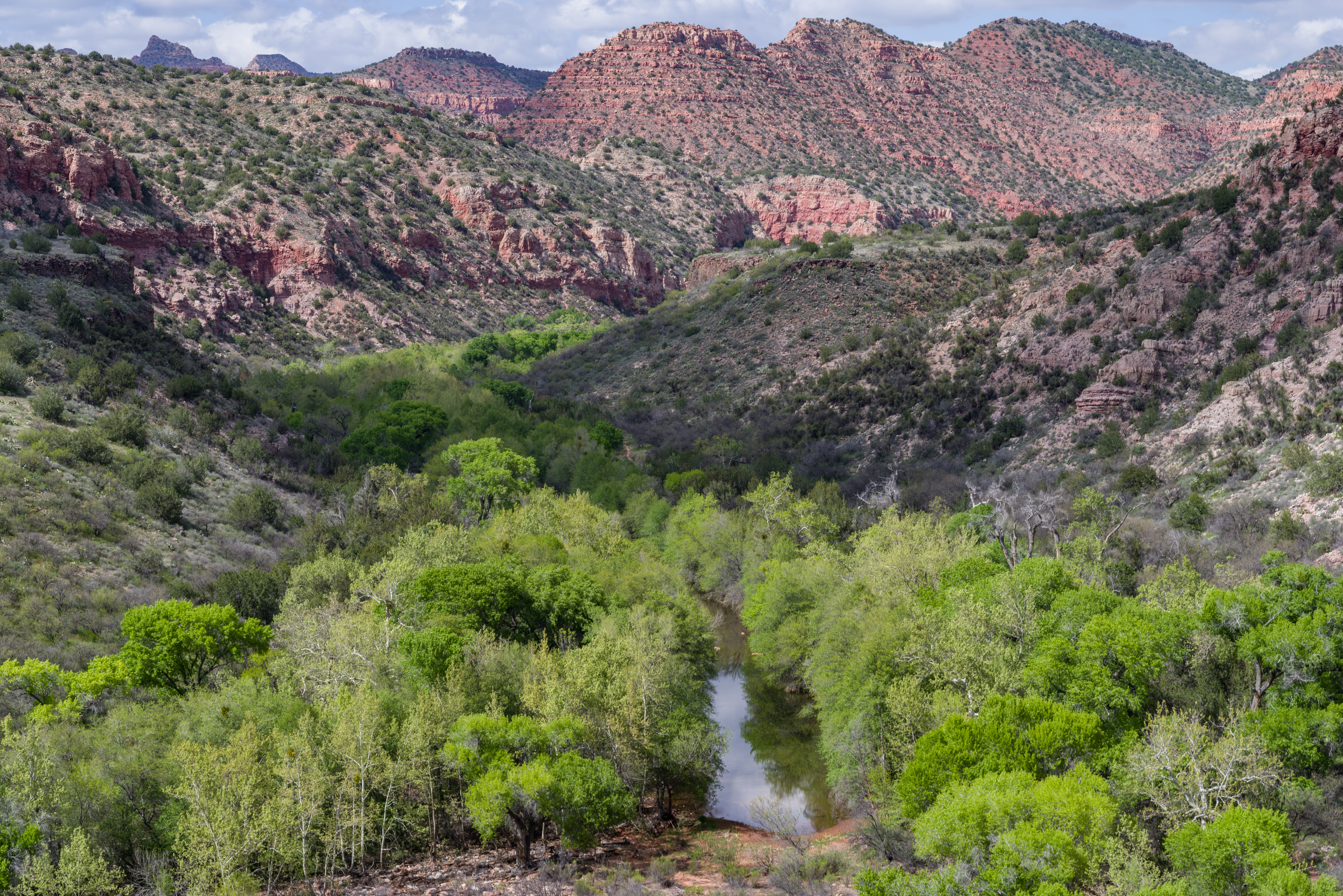
Parsons Trail in Sycamore Canyon Wilderness

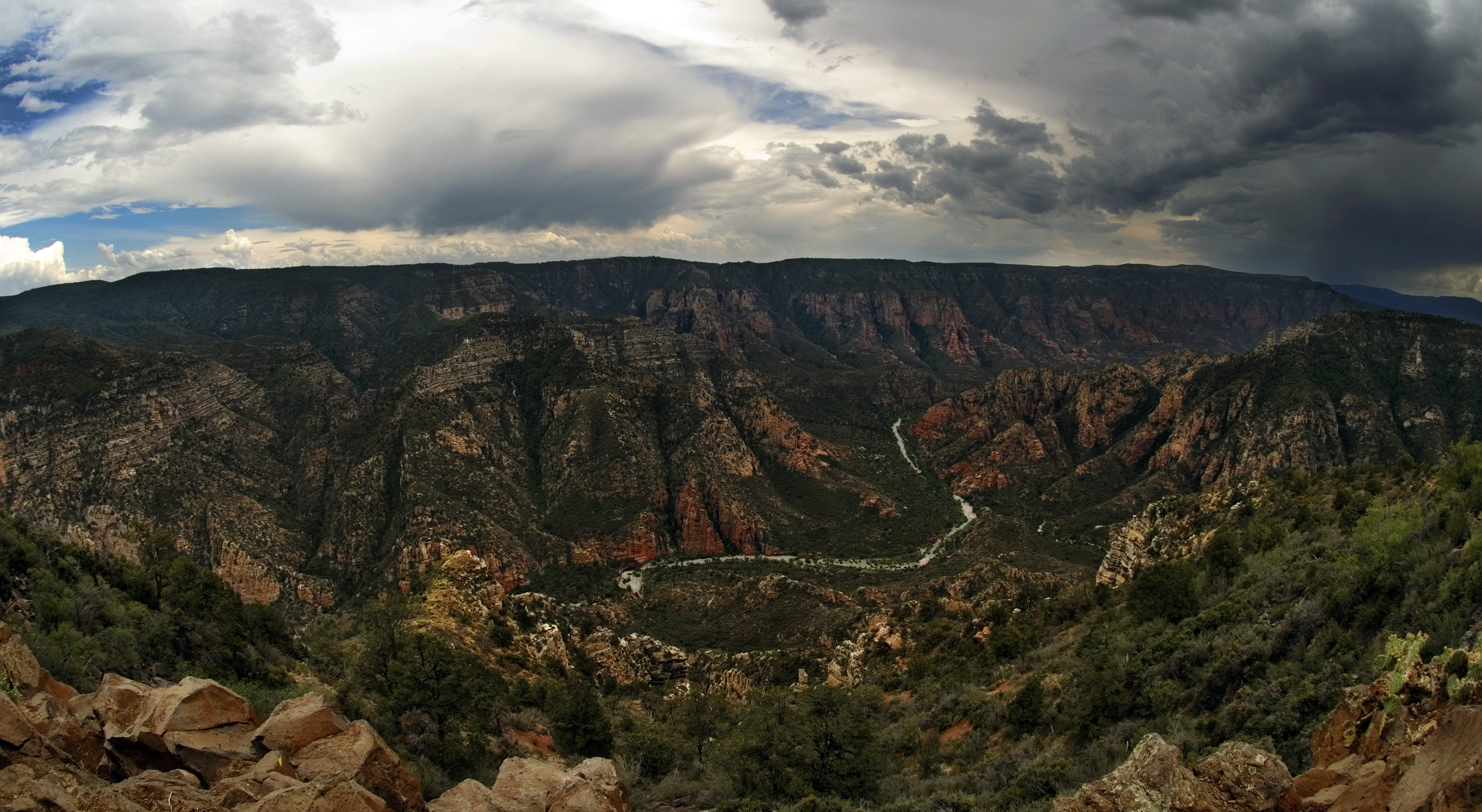
Sycamore Point, on the Rim Trail

Sycamore Canyon Wilderness is a 56,000-acre (22,662 ha) wilderness area in the Coconino, Kaibab and Prescott national forests in the U.S. state of Arizona. Encompassing Sycamore Canyon and its surrounds from south of Williams to the confluence of Sycamore Creek with the Verde River, the wilderness is about 40 miles (64 km) southwest of Flagstaff. The canyon is one of several in Arizona that cut through the Mogollon Rim. Relevant United States Geological Survey (USGS) map quadrangles are Davenport Hill, White Horse Lake, May Tank Pocket, Perkinsville, Sycamore Basin, and Clarkdale. Red Rock-Secret Mountain Wilderness borders Sycamore Canyon Wilderness on the east.

Ring-tailed cats, black bears, mountain lions, elk, deer, rattlesnakes, scorpions, canyon wrens, hermit thrushes, and many other creatures frequent the wilderness. Vegetation, which varies with elevation and the availability of water, includes stands of pine, fir, sycamore, walnut, and cottonwood. The canyon walls include exposures of red sandstone, white limestone, and brown lava. Parts of the wilderness are open for dispersed camping; many trails are open for horseback riding as well as hiking.

== Trails ==
A group of trails—Kelsey, Dorsey, Winter Cabin, Little Lo, and Hog Hill—with a combined length of 11.3 miles (18.2 km) wind through the upper parts of the wilderness. The longest of these is Kelsey Trail, 5.6 miles (9.0 km), which descends through a forest of ponderosa pine, Gambel oak, and juniper into chaparral at lower elevations.

The upper-canyon group of trails intersect with others further downstream. Among these is the 2.9-mile (4.7 km) Taylor Cabin Trail, which leads to a cabin formerly used by cowboys who grazed cattle in the canyon. The cabin is listed on the National Register of Historic Places. It may also be approached from downstream along the Sycamore Basin Trail, which intersects other trails such as the Dogie Trail that descends about 5.5 miles (8.9 km) into the canyon from Sycamore Pass, northwest of Sedona.

Sycamore Rim Trail is an 11-mile (18 km) loop in the Kaibab National Forest. Several trailheads provide access to the loop, which is relatively flat, ranging in elevation from 6,700 to 7,287 feet (2,042 to 2,221 m). Much of the trail passes through ponderosa pine forests; in other places the path crosses meadows or traverses mesas with desert plants like agave. The southern part of the loop follows the rim of the canyon along the northern boundary of the wilderness. The sections of trail outside of the wilderness are open to mountain biking as well as hiking.

Parsons Trail follows lower Sycamore Creek for about 4 miles (6 km) from near the Verde River upstream from Clarkdale and Tuzigoot National Monument to Parson Spring. Vegetation varies from cottonwoods to mesquite and includes plants such as columbine and watercress near seeps. Colorful rock formations, some bearing caves, form the canyon walls. The perennial flow of water in this part of the creek provides habitat for wildlife that includes otters and great blue herons. Camping is prohibited in the wilderness downstream of Parson Spring.

== See also ==
- Sycamore Canyon (Yavapai County, Arizona)
- List of Arizona Wilderness Areas
- List of U.S. Wilderness Areas
- Wilderness Act
