= Sycamore Canyon (Yavapai County, Arizona) =

Landform in Yavapai County, Arizona

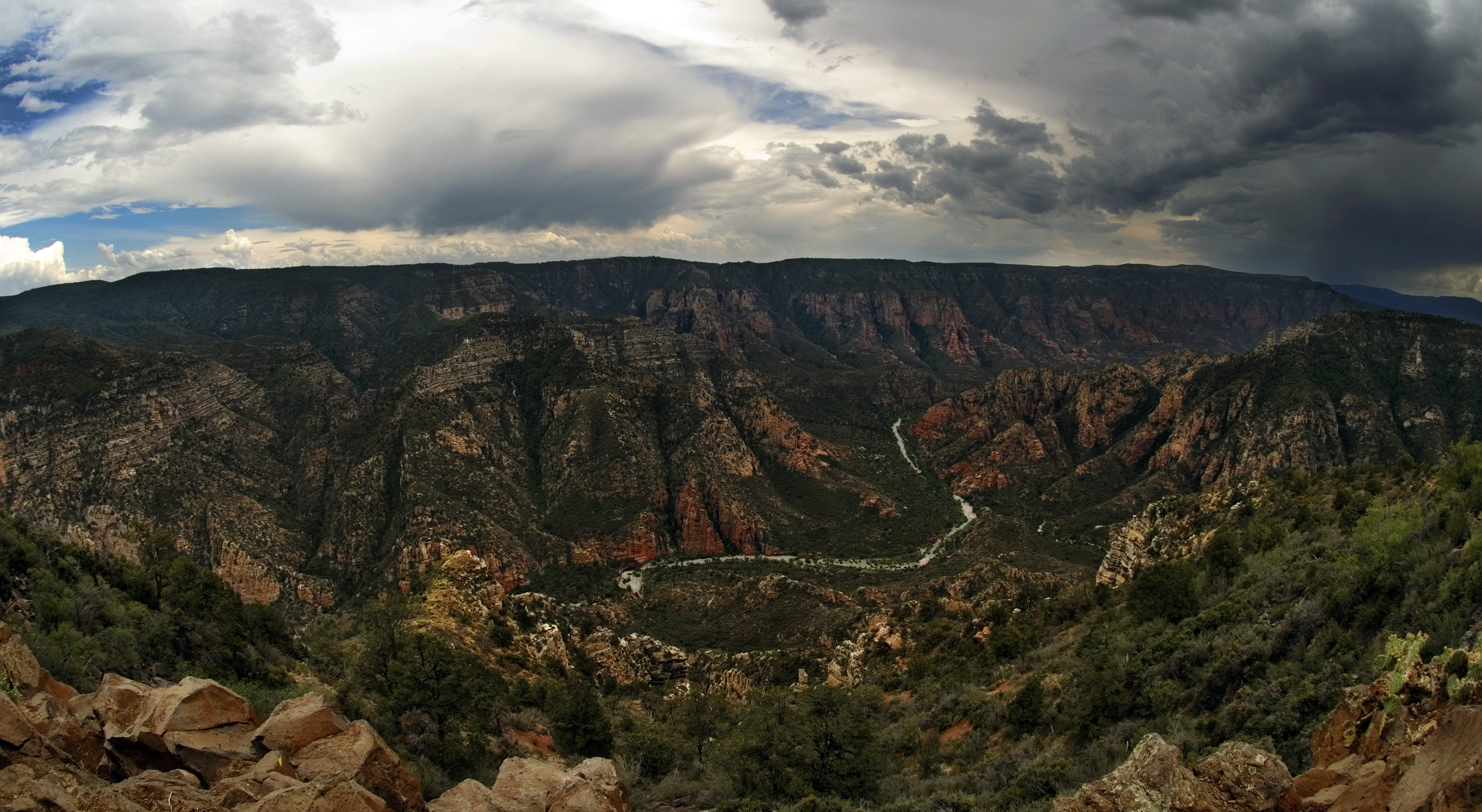
- Sycamore Canyon from Sycamore Point, south of Williams, Arizona.

- Location within Arizona Location within the United States
- Length: 21 miles (34 km)
- Width: 7 miles (11 km)

Geography
- Location: Sycamore Canyon Wilderness, Arizona, United States
- Coordinates: 35°03′06″N 111°57′33″W
- Topo map: USGS Davenport Hill, AZ
- Interactive map of Sycamore Canyon
- IUCN category Ib (wilderness area)
- Designated: 1972

Sycamore Canyon is the second largest canyon in the Arizona redrock country, after Oak Creek Canyon. The 21-mile (34 km) long scenic canyon reaches a maximum width of about 7 miles (11 km). It is in North Central Arizona bordering and below the Mogollon Rim, and is located west and northwest of Sedona in Yavapai and Coconino counties.

== Description ==
Sycamore Creek, a tributary of the Verde River, flows through the canyon. Sycamore Canyon enters the Verde River canyon 6.5 miles (10.5 km) north-northwest of Clarkdale.

Located within three different U.S. National Forests, the Coconino, Kaibab, and Prescott National Forests, Sycamore Canyon is home to a variety of wildlife including black bear, deer, and mountain lion. Unlike the nearby and more heavily visited Oak Creek Canyon, much of Sycamore Canyon is protected by the 56,000-acre (23,000 ha) Sycamore Canyon Wilderness, located at 35.05°N 111.96°W, and therefore roads and developed campgrounds are nonexistent. Hiking and horseback riding are the only ways to visit the canyon. The most popular access is via the Parsons Spring trail, upriver from Tuzigoot National Monument. A high-clearance vehicle is helpful to reach the trailhead.

Sycamore Canyon is one of the oldest designated Wilderness Areas in Arizona, originally being a Forest Service "Primitive Area" before the Wilderness Act of 1964.

== Gallery ==
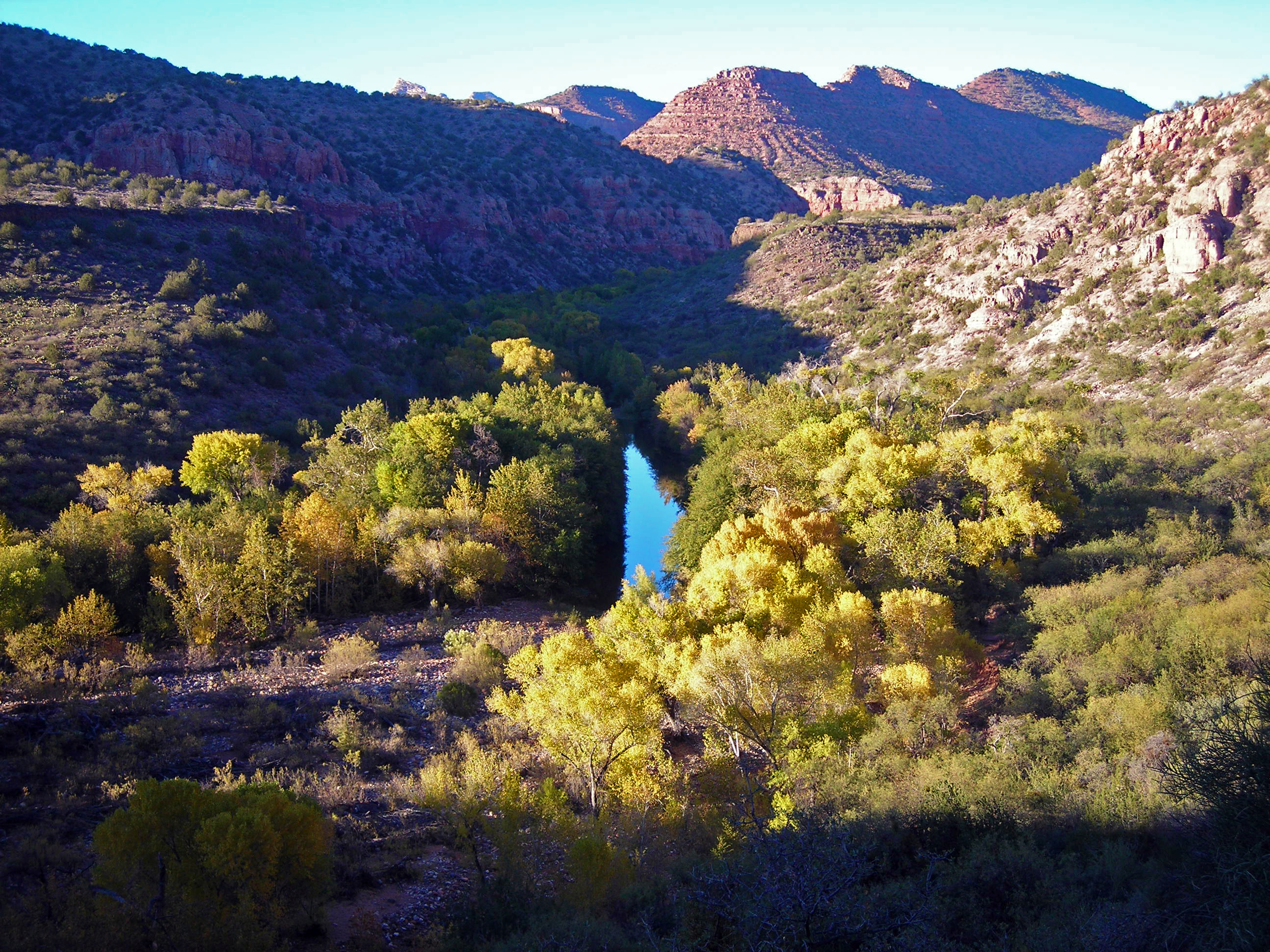
Lower Sycamore Canyon, near the trailhead

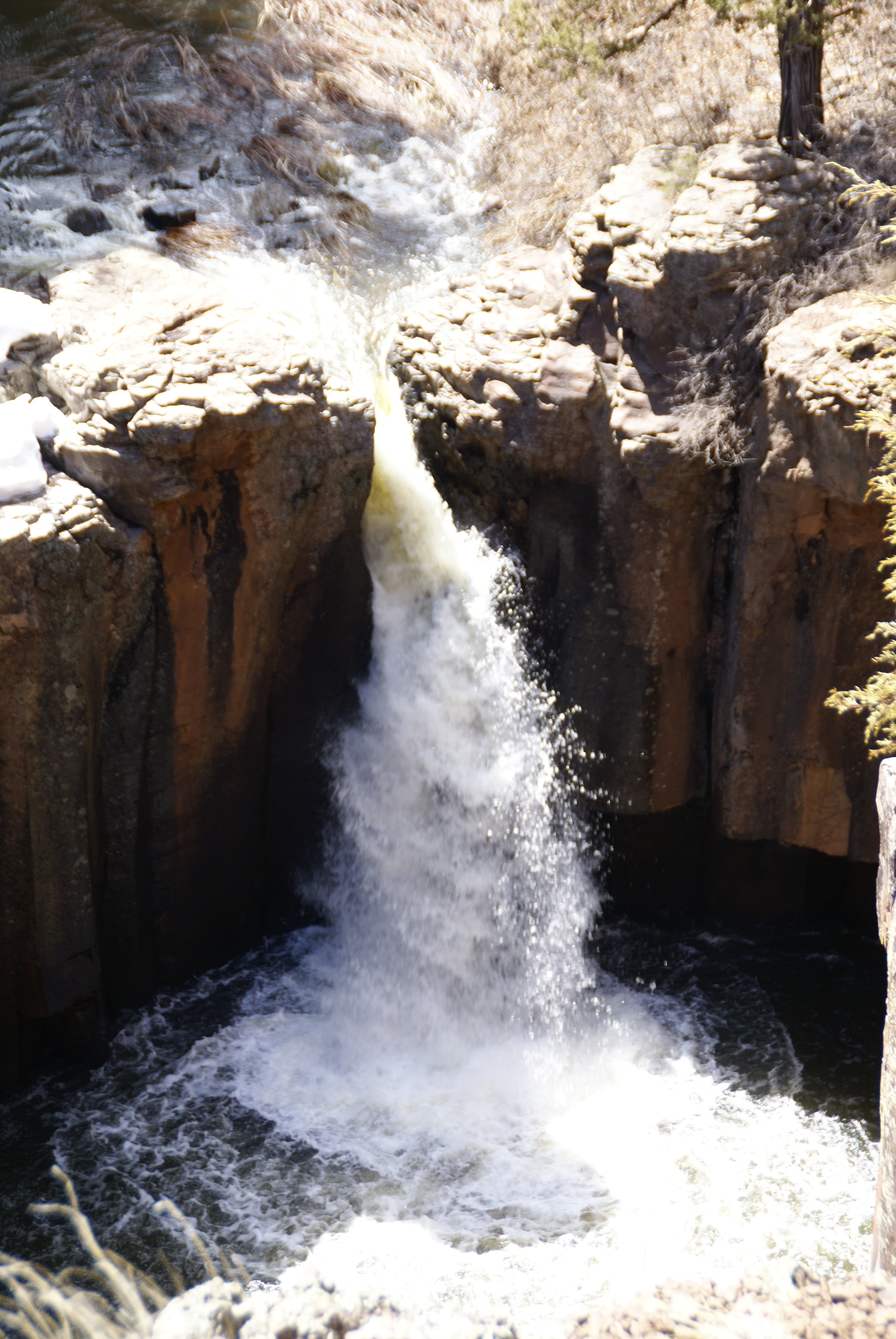
Sycamore Falls

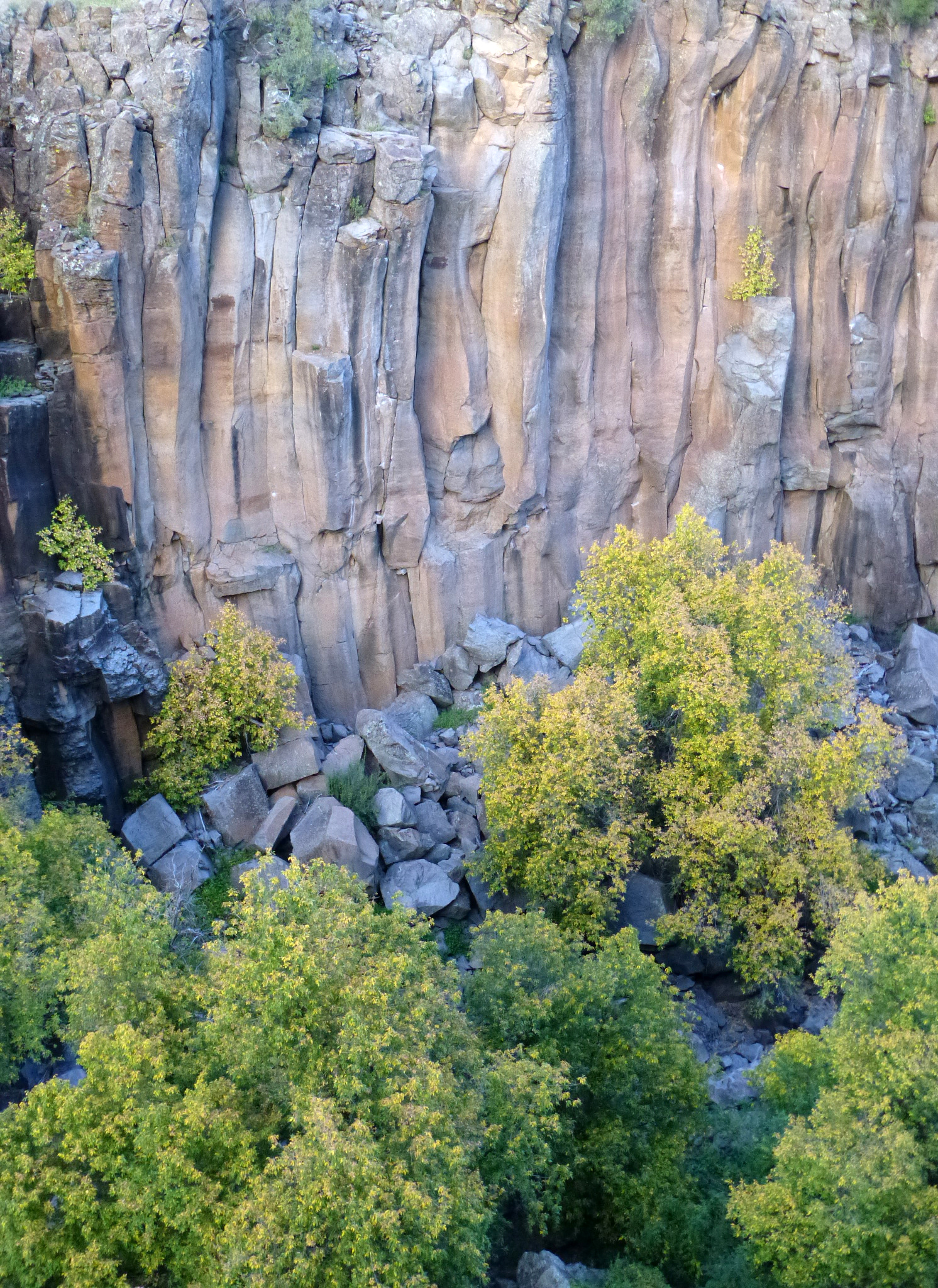
Columnar basalt in the lower canyon

== See also ==
- Keyhole Sink

== Additional Reading ==
- Paradise Forks Rock Climbing by David Bloom
