= Red Butte =

Landform in Coconino County, Arizona

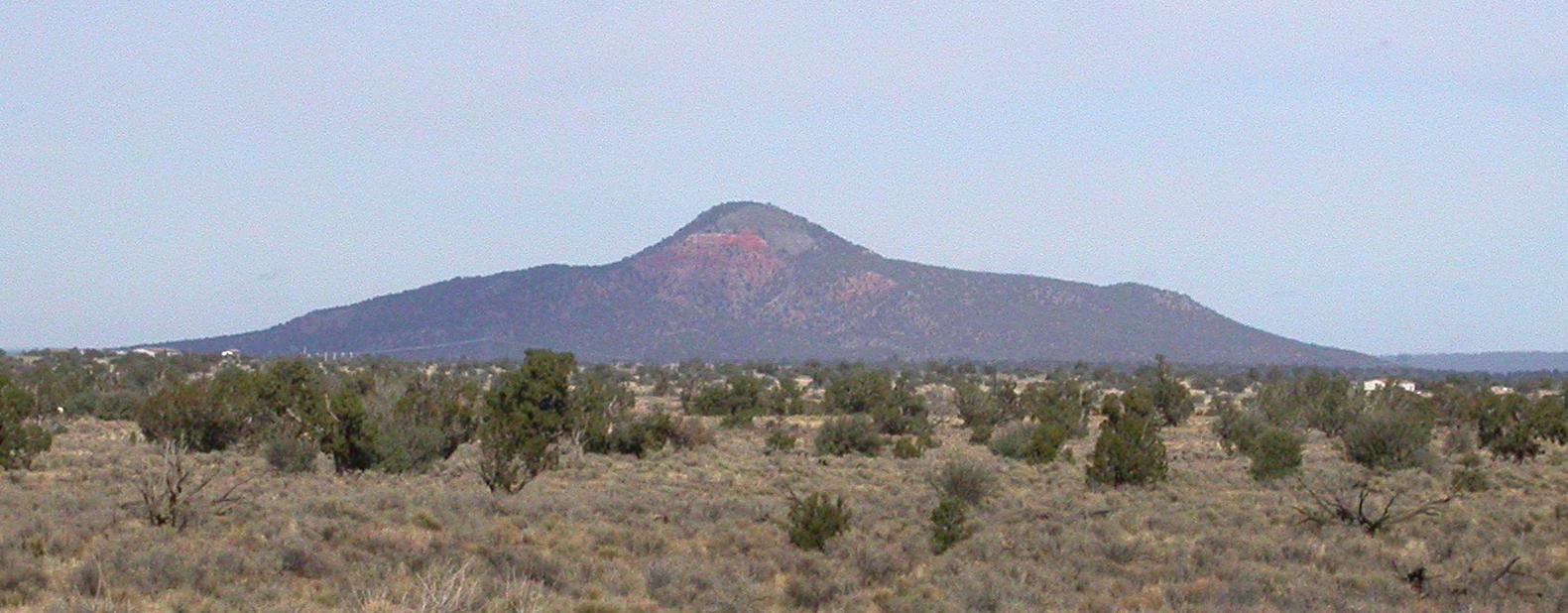
- Red Butte from the south

Highest point
- Elevation: 7,329 ft (2,234 m) NAVD 88
- Prominence: 956 ft (291 m)
- Coordinates: 35°49′14″N 112°05′23″W

Geography
- Location within Arizona Location within the United States
- Location: Coconino County, Arizona, U.S.
- Parent range: Coconino Plateau
- Topo map: USGS Red Butte

Geology
- Rock age: Mesozoic

Climbing
- Easiest route: USFS trail on west side

Red Butte is a butte located in the Kaibab National Forest in Coconino County, Arizona . It is known to the Havasupai nation as Wii'i Gdwiisa, "clenched fist mountain," and is regarded as a sacred site.

== Description ==
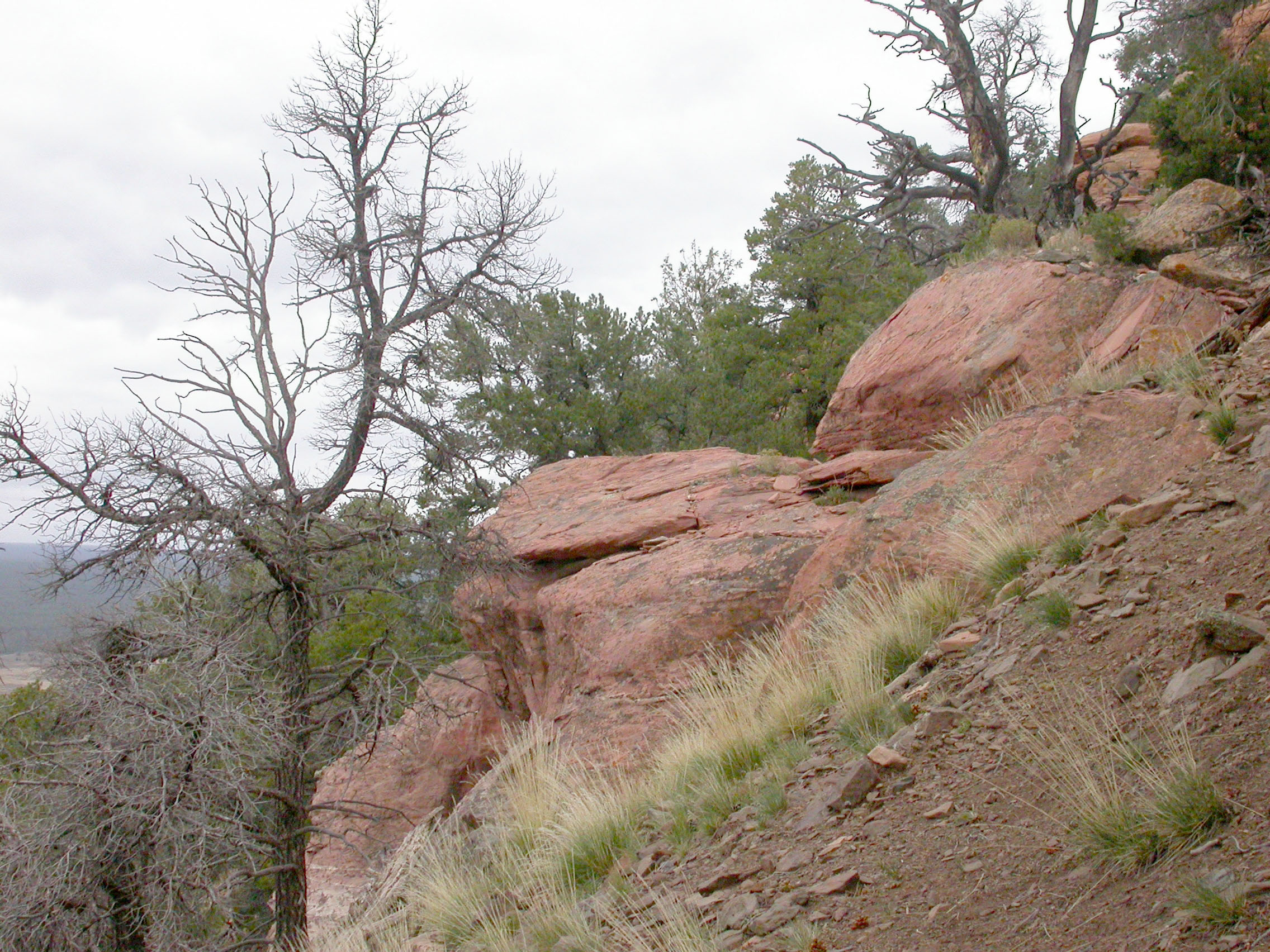
Moenkopi sandstone outcrop

Red Butte is not to be confused with Red Mountain, a blown out volcano located a few miles to the south. It is the most notable feature on the Coconino Plateau between the San Francisco volcanic field and the Grand Canyon. Its base is formed of sandstones of the Moenkopi Formation. Above that are strata of the Shinarump Conglomerate; the summit is capped with volcanic rocks.

A trail leads to the summit along the west side. The summit affords a good view of the San Francisco Peaks, but because of the slope of the Coconino Plateau, only the uppermost part of the North Rim of the Grand Canyon can be seen.

== Lookout tower ==
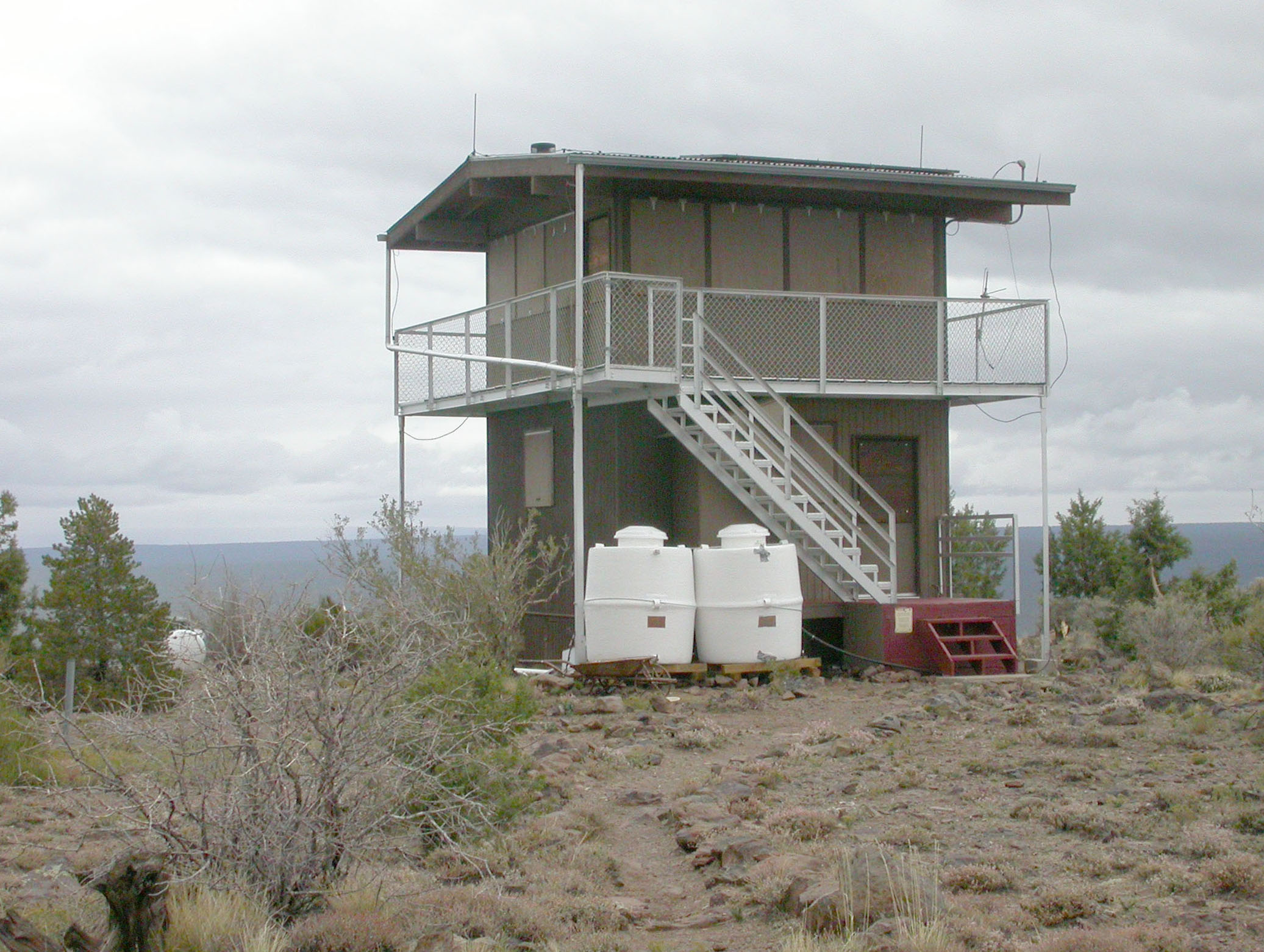
Fire lookout at summit

The Red Butte tower is listed on the National Historic Lookout Register. Its design is based on the USFS CL 100 plan with modifications. The 14' x 14' cab with tinted windows has a permanent roof overhang for shade. There is a metal catwalk and two cistern tanks for lookout staff water supply.
