= Keyhole Sink =

Canyon in the Kaibab National Forest, Arizona

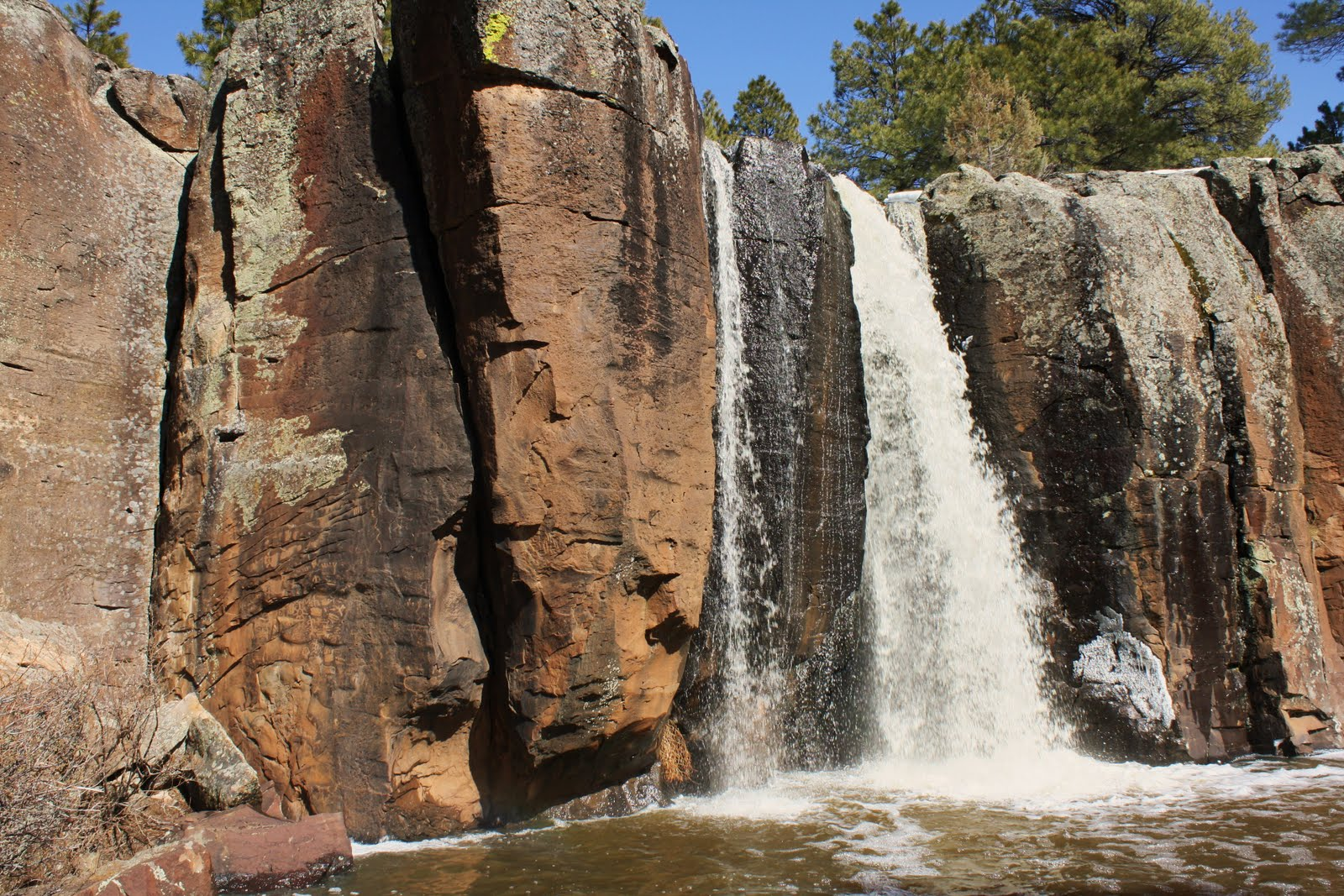
- A waterfall in Keyhole Sink.

- Location within Arizona
- Floor elevation: 7,024 ft (2,141 m)

Geography
- Location: Coconino County, Arizona, U.S.
- Coordinates: 35°16′12″N 112°00′50″W
- Topo map: USGS Sitgreaves Mountain
- Interactive map of Keyhole Sink

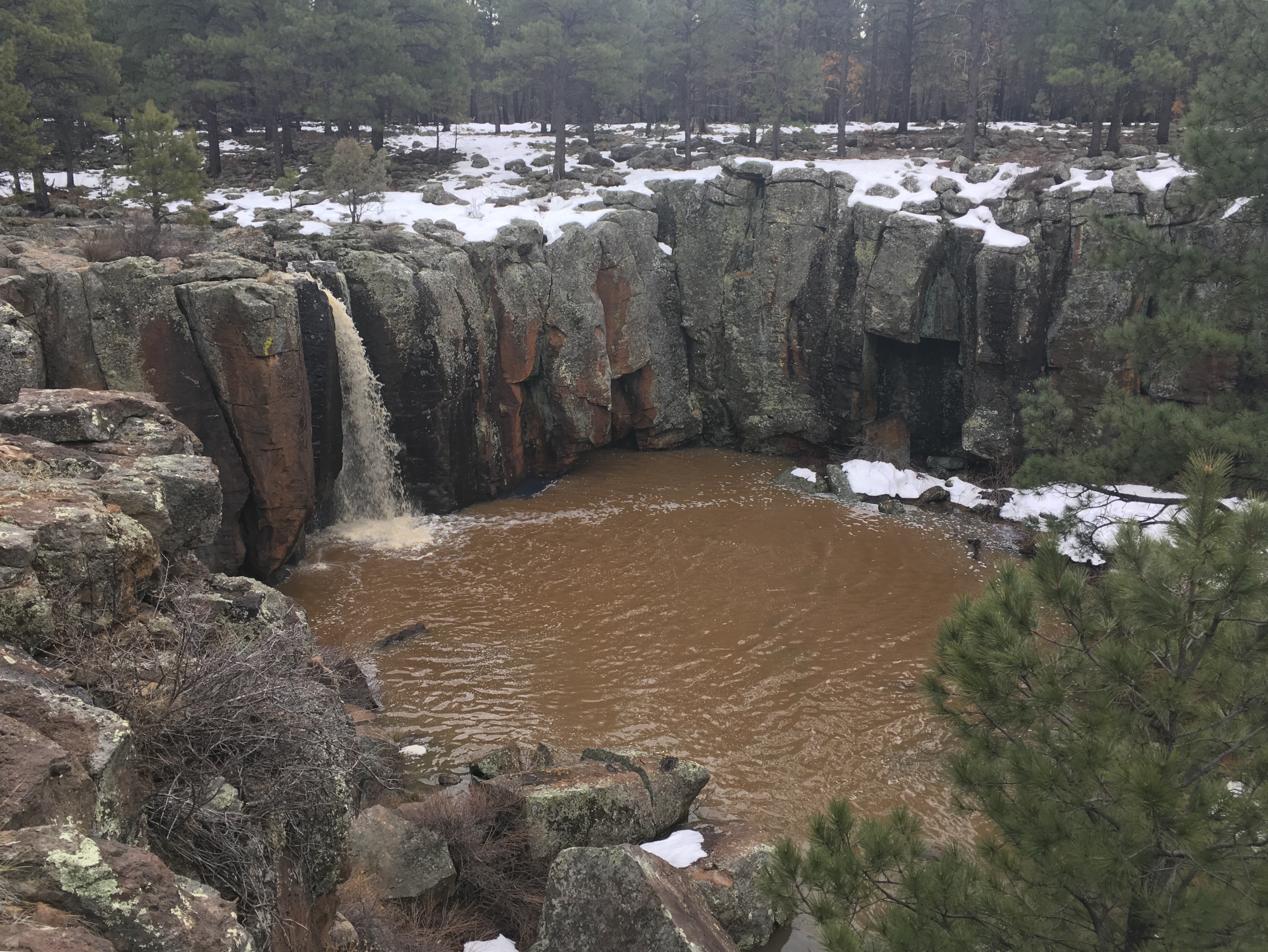
Water flowing into Keyhole Sink in winter.

Keyhole Sink is a canyon in the shape of a keyhole near Williams, Arizona. The canyon is best known for its petroglyphs, which were created about 1,000 years ago by the ancient Cohonina people, and the seasonal waterfalls that flow into the canyon.

== Archaeology ==
Keyhole Sink, formerly called Box Canyon, is a few miles east of Williams off Route 66 in Kaibab National Forest, and can be accessed on foot by a short, unpaved pathway known as Keyhole Sink Trail. Archaeological research suggests that not many people actually lived in Keyhole Sink, and that it was mainly used as a sort of sacred rest stop for hunters and as a place for clan initiations. Surrounding the site for a radius of fifteen miles are remnants of pit house foundations.

The petroglyphs, which were carved into volcanic basalt, date from between 700 and 1100 CE. Design elements include snakes, lizards, deer, and amorphous images. The petroglyphs are considered to be heavily weathered, and in August 2010 vandals caused extensive damage by painting huge letters on them with "silvery white paint." The petroglyphs have since been restored, but the damage is still evident.

== Gallery ==
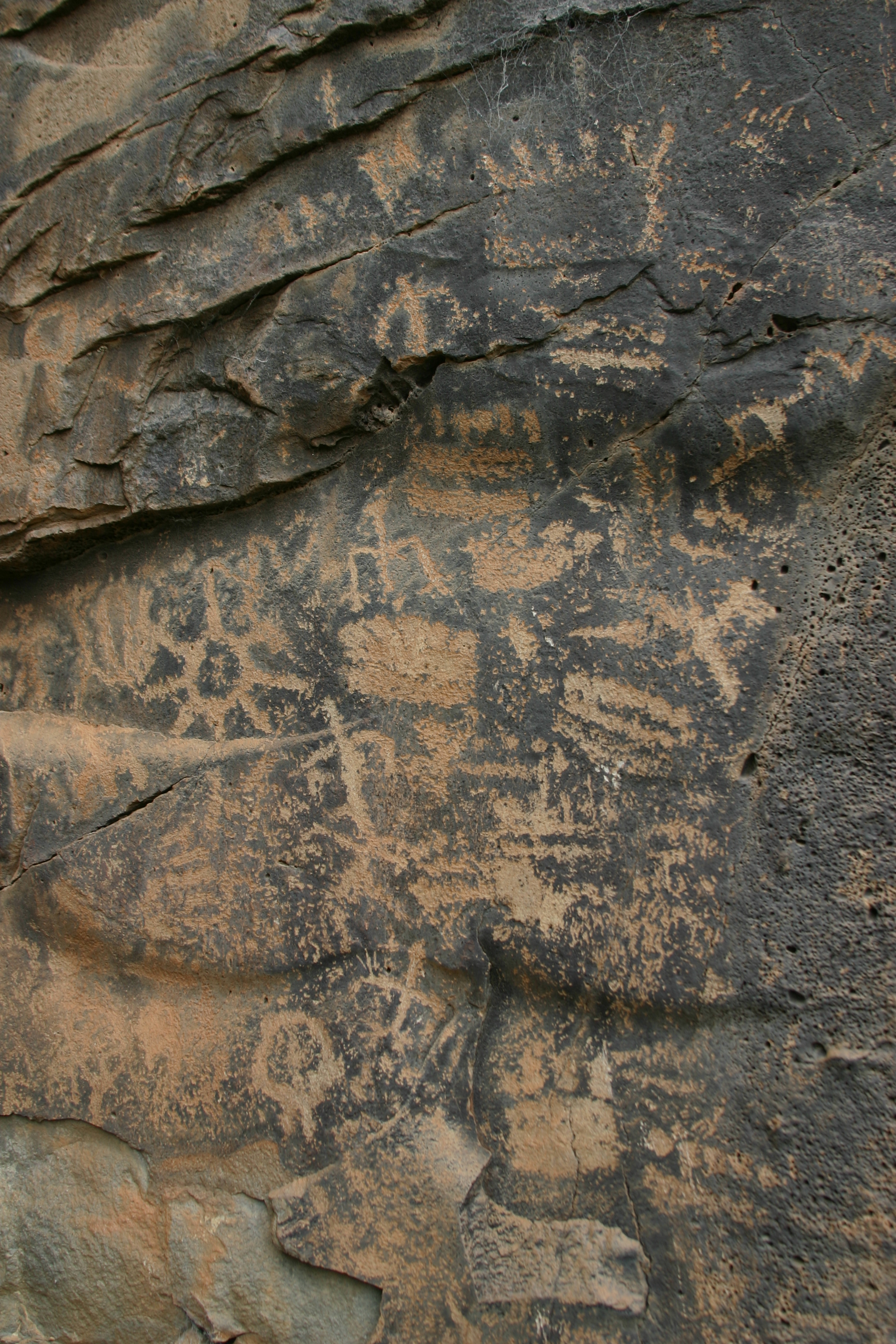
The Keyhole Sink Petroglyphs, as they appeared before being vandalized

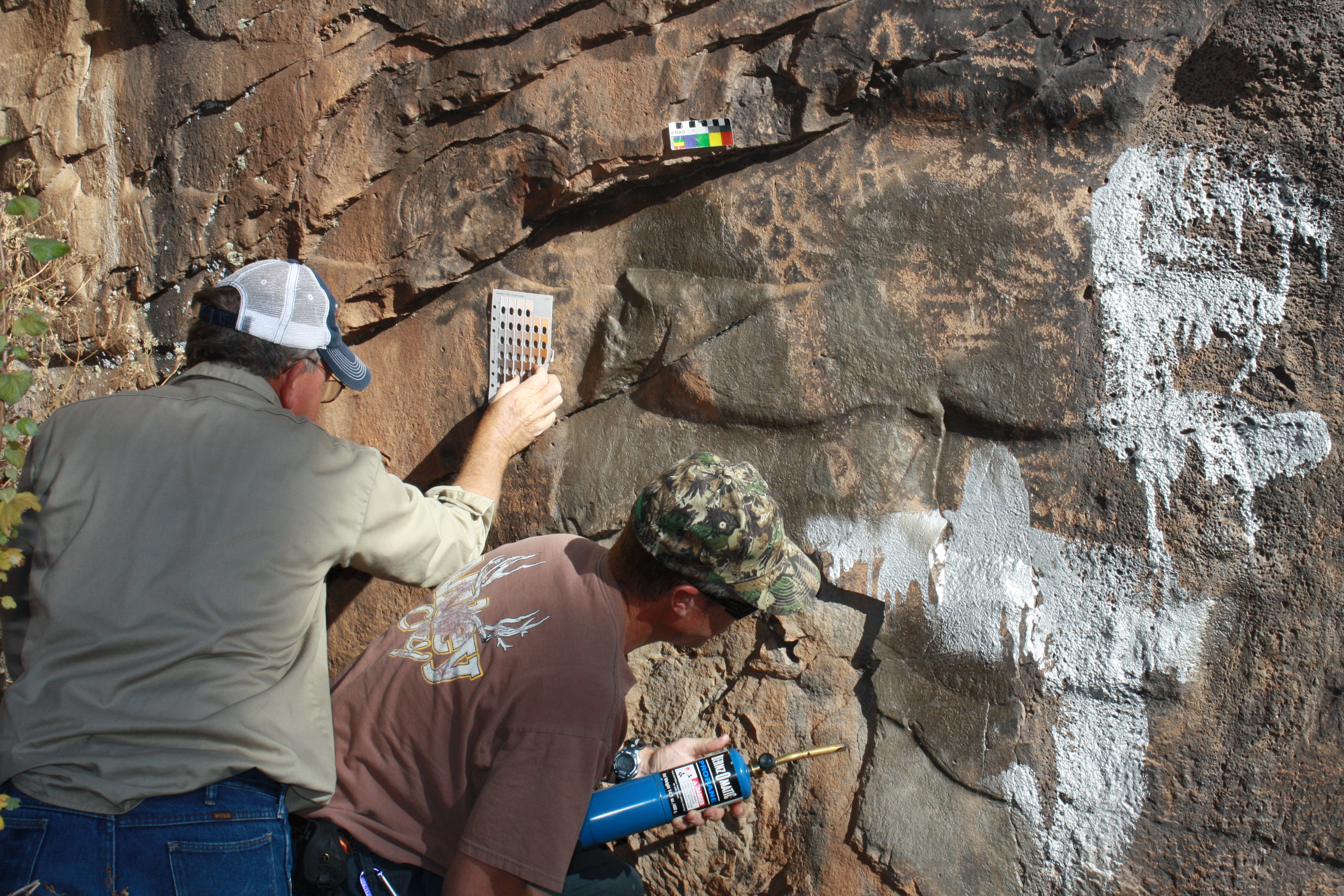
The petroglyphs during restoration

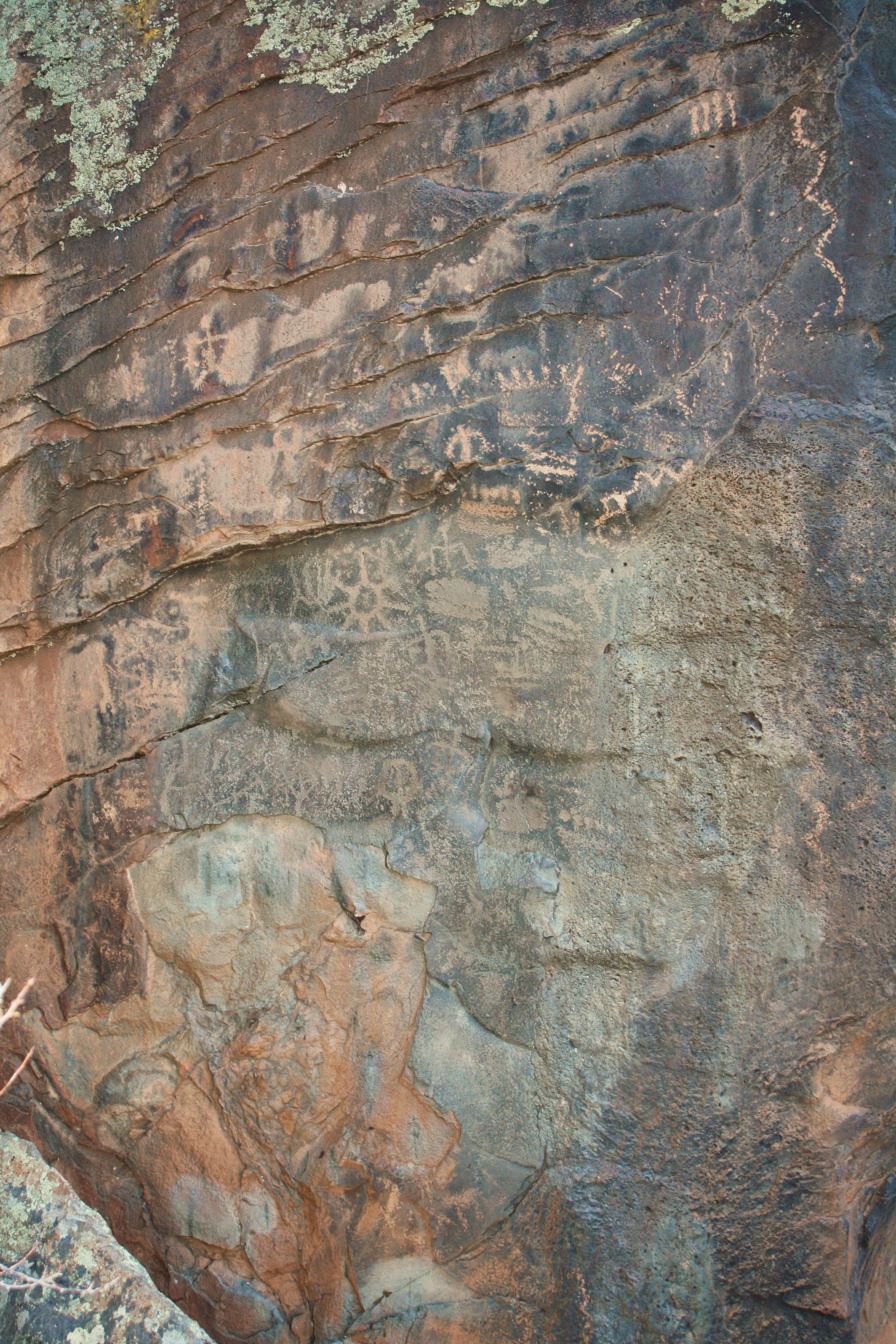
The petroglyphs after restoration

== See also ==
- Sycamore Canyon
