= Perkins Tank =

Reservoir in Coconino County, Arizona, US

- Location within Arizona Location within the United States
- Location: Coconino County, Arizona, United States
- Coordinates: 35°06′42″N 112°04′12″W
- Primary inflows: spring
- Basin countries: United States
- Surface area: 3 acres (1.2 ha)
- Average depth: 10 ft (3.0 m)
- Surface elevation: 6,820 ft (2,080 m)
- References: Perkins Tank – GNIS

Perkins Tank is located south of Williams in North Central Arizona within the acreage of Kaibab National Forest.

== Fish species & information ==
- Rainbow trout
