= Tusayan National Forest =

Former National Forest in Arizona

Coordinates: 35°45′05″N 110°36′02″W

Tusayan National Forest was established by the U.S. Forest Service in Arizona on July 1, 1910 with 1,830,487 acres (7,407.72 km^{2}) from part of Coconino National Forest and other lands. On October 22, 1934 the entire forest was transferred to Kaibab National Forest and the name was discontinued.

== See also ==
- Tusayan Ruins
- Tusayan, Arizona
