= Anita, Arizona =

- Ghost town
- Location of Anita in Arizona Anita, Arizona (the United States)
- Coordinates: 35.861°N 112.249°W
- Country: United States
- State: Arizona
- County: Coconino
- Elevation: 5,925 ft (1,806 m)
- Time zone: UTC-7 (Mountain (MST))
  - Summer (DST): UTC-7 (MST)
- Area code: 928
- FIPS code: 04-02970
- GNIS feature ID: 661

Anita was a mining town situated in Coconino County, Arizona on the Grand Canyon Railway. It was named in 1897 after a railroad surveyor's daughter.

== History ==
The town was founded around 1899 and was initially called Anita Junction.

The railroad was originally built to serve the Anita mines, just under three miles away on what became a spur of the line to Grand Canyon. The mines turned out to be worth little, which led to the continuation of the line to the canyon to serve tourists.

At its peak, Anita contained a school, post office, telephone, and the headquarters of the Anita-Moqui forest service district. It also had several railroad sidings.

The Anita section of the railroad was closed in 1942. By 1956, no structures remained at the site.

The school at Anita, along with the neighboring one at the lumber town of Apex, were at one time the only racially integrated schools in Arizona.
