= Grand Canyon Forest Reserve =

Former name for the National Forest

Coordinates: 36°N 112°W

The Grand Cañon Forest Reserve was established by the United States General Land Office in Arizona on February 20, 1893 with 1,851,250 acres (7,491.7 km^{2}). It was renamed Grand Canyon on August 8, 1906 and transferred to the U.S. Forest Service becoming a National Forest on March 4, 1907. On July 1, 1908 the entire forest was divided between Coconino National Forest and the newly established Kaibab National Forest, while other areas were returned to public lands, and the name was discontinued.
