= Kaibab National Forest =

Protected area in northern Arizona

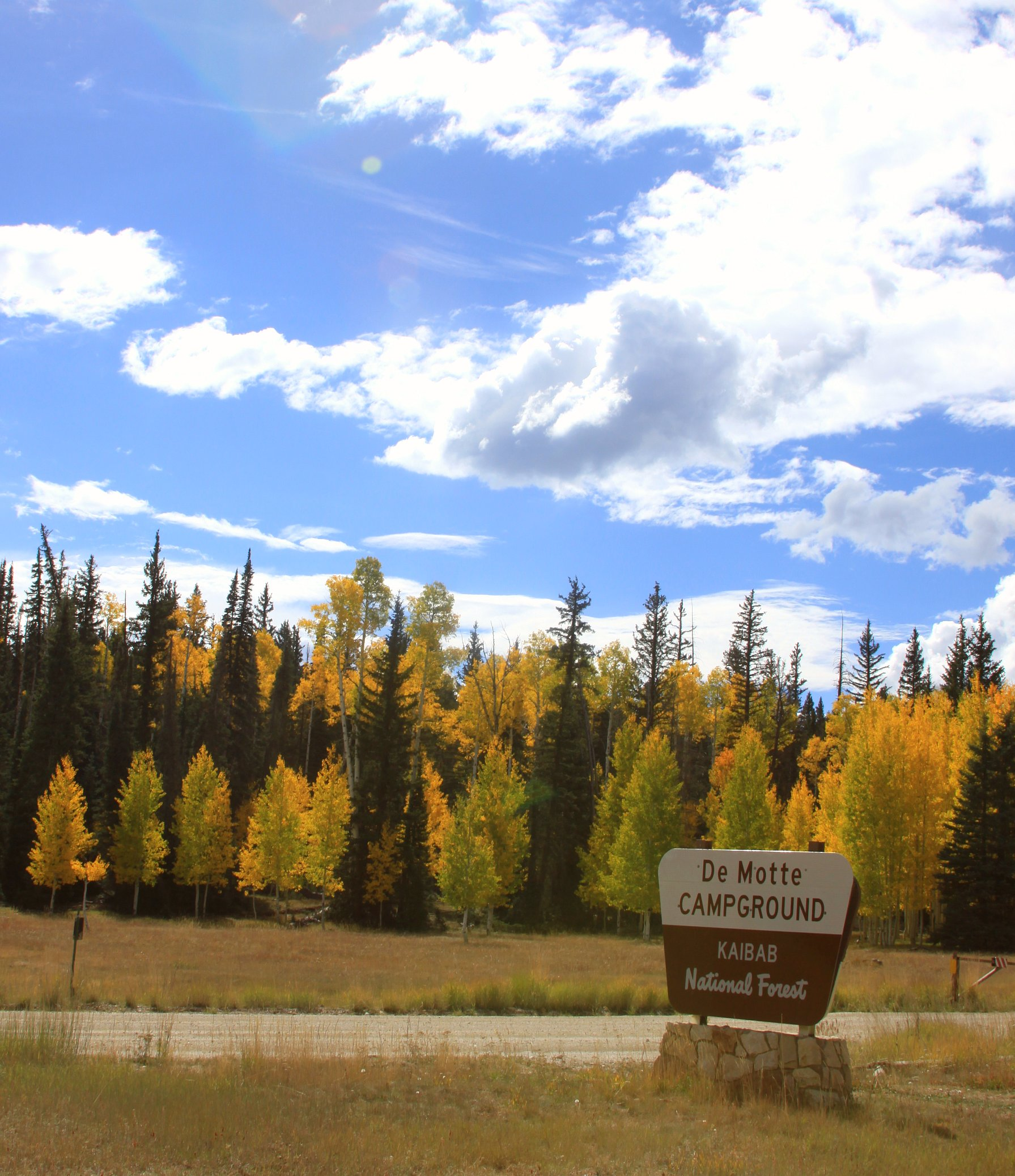
- Interactive map of Kaibab National Forest
- Location: Coconino, Yavapai, and Mohave counties, Arizona, U.S.
- Nearest city: Williams, Arizona
- Coordinates: 36°24′45″N 112°8′6″W
- Area: 1,600,000 acres (6,500 km^{2})
- Established: 1909
- Governing body: U.S. Forest Service
- Website: Kaibab National Forest

Kaibab National Forest (/ˈkaɪbæb/, KY-bab) borders both the north and south rims of the Grand Canyon, in north-central Arizona, United States. Its 1.6 million acres (650,000 ha) is divided into three sections: the North Kaibab Ranger District (offices in Fredonia), the Tusayan Ranger District (offices in the Grand Canyon), and the Williams Ranger District (offices in Williams). It is managed by the United States Forest Service. Grand Canyon National Park separates the North Kaibab and the South Kaibab (Tusayan and Williams). The South Kaibab covers less than 1,422 square miles (3,680 km^{2}) and the North Kaibab stretches over 1,010 square miles (2,600 km^{2}). Elevations vary on the forest from 5,500 feet (1,676 m) in the southwest corner to 10,418 feet (3,175 m) at the summit of Kendrick Peak on the Williams Ranger District. The forest as a whole is headquartered in Williams.

== North Kaibab ==
The Kaibab Plateau is an island surrounded by lower elevations. The plateau, with elevation up to 9,215 feet (2,800 m) is bordered on the south by the Grand Canyon, on the east and the west by tributary canyons of the Colorado River, and on the North by tiers of uplifted cliffs.

=== North Kaibab history ===
The North Kaibab Ranger District was part of the lands withdrawn from the public domain in 1893 and included in the Grand Canyon Forest Reserve. President Theodore Roosevelt created the Grand Canyon Game Preserve in 1906. The game preserve which includes 612,736 acres (2,479.65 km^{2}) of the Kaibab National Forest, is "set aside for the protection of game animals and birds," and is "to be recognized as a breeding place therefore." in 1908, the Forest Reserve north of the Grand Canyon, including the game preserve, was renamed Kaibab National Forest. In 1919, the National Park was created from the forest service lands surrounding the Grand Canyon. In 1934, the Tusayan National Forest south of the Grand Canyon was consolidated into the Kaibab National Forest, forming the present forest boundaries. Up until 1972, the North Kaibab consisted of two ranger districts, Big Springs and Jacob Lake. The headquarters of each were somewhat remote, particularly the Big Springs district. The two were combined and the forest area north of the canyon became the North Kaibab Ranger District and the district ranger station moved to Fredonia. The headquarters for the Kaibab National Forest is in Williams, Arizona.

=== North Kaibab climate ===
The climate of the North Kaibab, which encompasses the Kaibab Plateau, is a snowy highland climate, qualifying as Dsb/Csb under the Köppen climate classification, a type often described as Continental climate. There are two weather stations in this area: Jacob Lake, which is near the center of the plateau, and Bright Angel Ranger Station, which is located at a more southerly location and is higher in altitude. The higher altitude is reflected in Bright Angel's lower temperatures and increased precipitation versus Jacob Lake. Using the 0 °C (32 °F) isotherm between temperate and continental climates preferred by some climatologists, Bright Angel Ranger Station is Dsb, the dry-summer version of the warm summer humid continental climate. The North Kaibab is unusual for either a Csb or Dsb climate, featuring lower precipitation in early summer, with July and August being wetter (courtesy of the North American Monsoon). This is followed by a slightly drier period during the autumn months, and then a wetter period from December to March. Summers in this area feature warm days and cool nights. Winters are chilly, especially at night, and snowy. Jacob Lake averages 105 inches (270 cm) of snow per annum, and Bright Angel Ranger Station 135 inches (340 cm).

Climate data for Jacob Lake, Arizona (Elevation 7,920ft)
Month	Jan	Feb	Mar	Apr	May	Jun	Jul	Aug	Sep	Oct	Nov	Dec	Year
Record high °F (°C)	65 (18)	65 (18)	70 (21)	71 (22)	85 (29)	93 (34)	92 (33)	95 (35)	95 (35)	80 (27)	68 (20)	61 (16)	95 (35)
Mean daily maximum °F (°C)	40.9 (4.9)	41.6 (5.3)	45.1 (7.3)	52.3 (11.3)	64.1 (17.8)	74.5 (23.6)	79.5 (26.4)	77.6 (25.3)	71.4 (21.9)	58.8 (14.9)	46.9 (8.3)	41.0 (5.0)	57.8 (14.3)
Daily mean °F (°C)	28.4 (−2.0)	29.4 (−1.4)	32.7 (0.4)	39.4 (4.1)	50.1 (10.1)	59.3 (15.2)	65.0 (18.3)	63.3 (17.4)	57.0 (13.9)	45.7 (7.6)	35.0 (1.7)	29.0 (−1.7)	44.5 (7.0)
Mean daily minimum °F (°C)	15.9 (−8.9)	17.3 (−8.2)	20.2 (−6.6)	26.4 (−3.1)	36.2 (2.3)	44.1 (6.7)	50.5 (10.3)	49.0 (9.4)	42.6 (5.9)	32.6 (0.3)	22.9 (−5.1)	16.9 (−8.4)	31.2 (−0.5)
Record low °F (°C)	−20 (−29)	−13 (−25)	−9 (−23)	1 (−17)	15 (−9)	28 (−2)	35 (2)	30 (−1)	18 (−8)	−2 (−19)	−8 (−22)	−10 (−23)	−20 (−29)
Average precipitation inches (mm)	1.39 (35)	1.22 (31)	2.56 (65)	1.49 (38)	1.19 (30)	0.78 (20)	2.70 (69)	2.77 (70)	1.39 (35)	1.68 (43)	1.73 (44)	1.98 (50)	20.89 (531)
Average snowfall inches (cm)	15.2 (39)	14.9 (38)	27.7 (70)	11.6 (29)	3.3 (8.4)	0.0 (0.0)	0.0 (0.0)	0.0 (0.0)	0.1 (0.25)	2.9 (7.4)	14.0 (36)	15.6 (40)	105.4 (268)
Average precipitation days (≥ 0.01 in)	4.7	5.5	7.2	5.2	4.8	3.4	9.1	9.1	4.3	4.9	4.2	5.5	67.9
Average snowy days (≥ 0.1 in)	3.8	4.5	5.3	3.2	0.7	0.0	0.0	0.0	0.1	1.3	2.9	4.1	25.9
Source 1: Western Regional Climate Center
Source 2: XMACIS2

Climate data for Bright Angel Ranger Station, Arizona, 1991–2020 normals, extremes 1925–present
Month	Jan	Feb	Mar	Apr	May	Jun	Jul	Aug	Sep	Oct	Nov	Dec	Year
Record high °F (°C)	63 (17)	64 (18)	67 (19)	74 (23)	85 (29)	91 (33)	92 (33)	90 (32)	88 (31)	82 (28)	66 (19)	68 (20)	92 (33)
Mean maximum °F (°C)	49.4 (9.7)	50.8 (10.4)	58.1 (14.5)	66.2 (19.0)	76.4 (24.7)	84.1 (28.9)	87.7 (30.9)	83.9 (28.8)	78.6 (25.9)	68.4 (20.2)	58.5 (14.7)	50.3 (10.2)	88.0 (31.1)
Mean daily maximum °F (°C)	36.2 (2.3)	37.3 (2.9)	44.3 (6.8)	52.2 (11.2)	62.0 (16.7)	73.4 (23.0)	77.2 (25.1)	74.1 (23.4)	67.1 (19.5)	55.6 (13.1)	44.7 (7.1)	36.4 (2.4)	55.0 (12.8)
Daily mean °F (°C)	27.1 (−2.7)	28.2 (−2.1)	33.6 (0.9)	40.2 (4.6)	48.8 (9.3)	58.2 (14.6)	63.3 (17.4)	61.2 (16.2)	54.5 (12.5)	44.3 (6.8)	34.3 (1.3)	26.9 (−2.8)	43.4 (6.3)
Mean daily minimum °F (°C)	18.0 (−7.8)	19.0 (−7.2)	23.0 (−5.0)	28.2 (−2.1)	35.6 (2.0)	42.9 (6.1)	49.3 (9.6)	48.3 (9.1)	41.9 (5.5)	33.0 (0.6)	23.9 (−4.5)	17.4 (−8.1)	31.7 (−0.2)
Mean minimum °F (°C)	−0.3 (−17.9)	2.0 (−16.7)	6.5 (−14.2)	15.0 (−9.4)	23.6 (−4.7)	31.3 (−0.4)	40.1 (4.5)	40.4 (4.7)	30.4 (−0.9)	20.1 (−6.6)	6.7 (−14.1)	−0.9 (−18.3)	−5.3 (−20.7)
Record low °F (°C)	−23 (−31)	−23 (−31)	−14 (−26)	−4 (−20)	10 (−12)	22 (−6)	26 (−3)	24 (−4)	18 (−8)	6 (−14)	−11 (−24)	−22 (−30)	−23 (−31)
Average precipitation inches (mm)	3.56 (90)	3.48 (88)	2.95 (75)	1.56 (40)	0.79 (20)	0.37 (9.4)	1.78 (45)	2.75 (70)	1.93 (49)	1.75 (44)	1.40 (36)	1.86 (47)	24.18 (613.4)
Average snowfall inches (cm)	33.0 (84)	26.6 (68)	23.6 (60)	11.4 (29)	2.7 (6.9)	0.2 (0.51)	0.0 (0.0)	0.0 (0.0)	0.0 (0.0)	3.4 (8.6)	10.3 (26)	15.0 (38)	126.2 (321.01)
Average extreme snow depth inches (cm)	30.6 (78)	36.3 (92)	36.6 (93)	18.0 (46)	2.4 (6.1)	0.0 (0.0)	0.0 (0.0)	0.0 (0.0)	0.0 (0.0)	2.5 (6.4)	7.5 (19)	15.0 (38)	44.3 (113)
Average precipitation days (≥ 0.01 in)	7.3	7.3	6.1	4.6	4.1	2.3	9.1	11.0	7.1	5.4	4.4	6.5	75.2
Average snowy days (≥ 0.1 in)	6.9	6.8	5.0	3.1	1.0	0.1	0.0	0.0	0.0	0.8	3.3	6.1	33.1
Source 1: NOAA
Source 2: National Weather Service

== South Kaibab ==
The South Kaibab includes the Tusayan Ranger District and the Williams Ranger District. The Tusayan Ranger District is part of Baaj Nwaavjo I'tah Kukveni – Ancestral Footprints of the Grand Canyon National Monument.

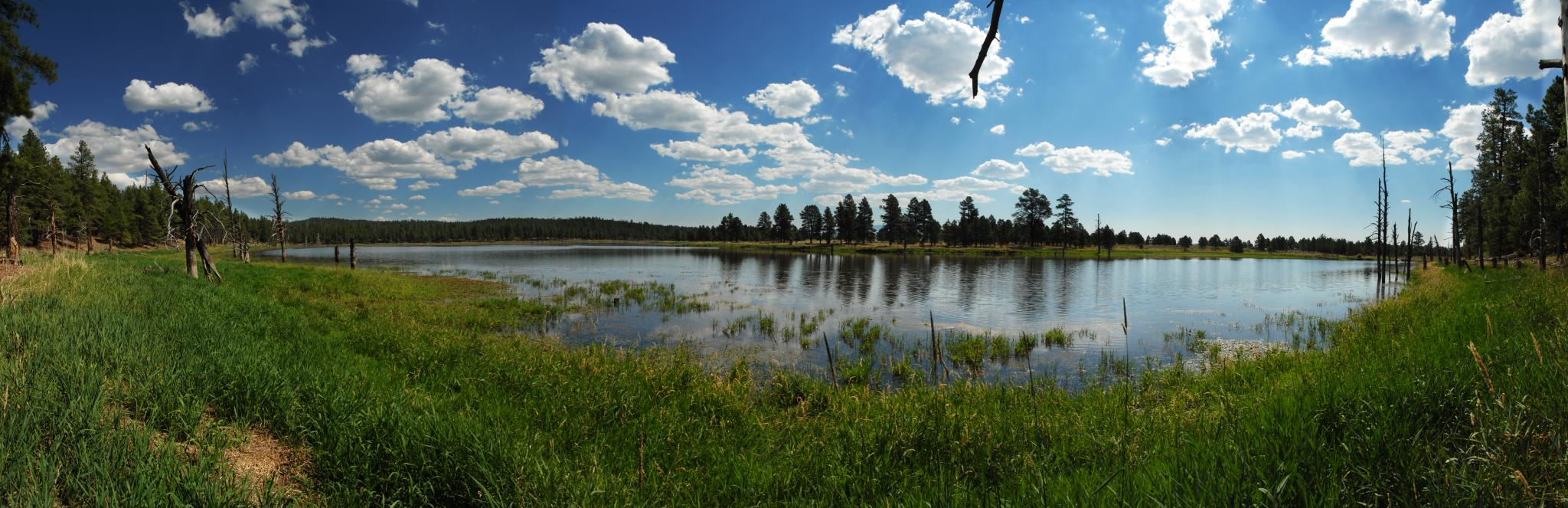
Panorama of Scholz Lake in the Williams Ranger District

== Vegetation ==
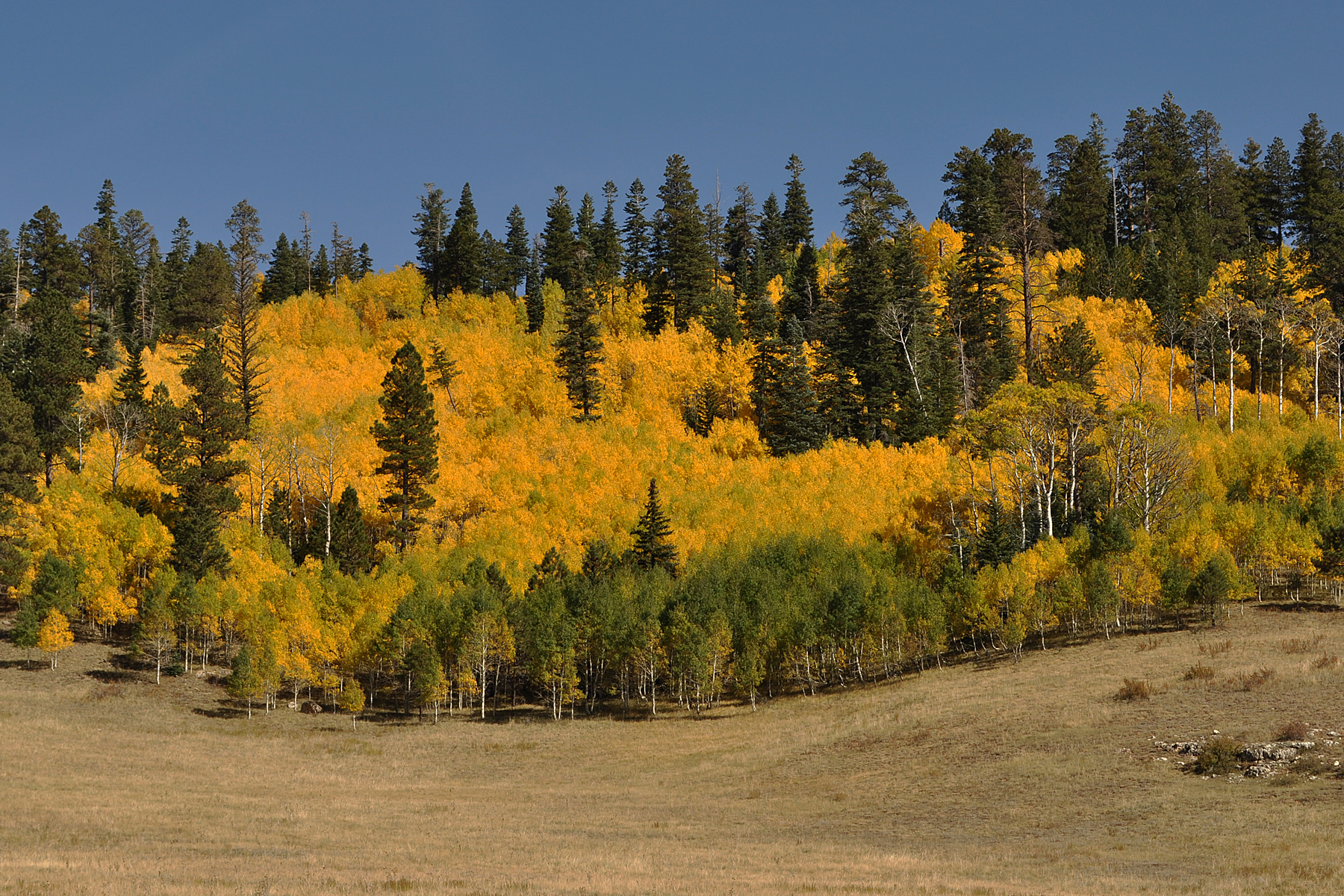
Aspen trees in fall colors, North Kaibab Ranger District

Vegetation in the forest varies by elevation and exposure. Principal tree species are ponderosa pine, Douglas-fir, Engelmann spruce, aspen, blue spruce, oak, pinyon pine, and juniper. Among other things, they enhance the beauty of the landscape, hold soil in place, and provide cover and food for wildlife. As elevation decreases, trees give way to bitterbrush, Gambel oak, sagebrush, and cliffrose. Within the forest, there are irregular areas entirely free of tree growth.

== Wildlife ==
Commonly seen large wild animals include Coues white-tailed deer, mule deer, elk, pronghorn, wild turkey and coyote. Cougar, bobcat, and black bear are seen less frequently. Bison that live in the forest and national park are owned by the state of Arizona that issues hunting permits within the national forest. Bison were introduced to northern Arizona in the early 1900s as part of a ranching operation to crossbreed them with cattle.

Common small animals in Kaibab National Forest include chipmunks, ground squirrels and Abert's squirrels. Less common are porcupines, small lizards, and rattlesnakes. Most common birds are bluebirds, robins, Steller's jays, nuthatches, flickers and other woodpeckers, crows, various hummingbirds, ravens, and a variety of hawks. Bats also occupy the park.

== Wilderness ==
There are four designated wilderness areas in the Kaibab National Forest. Two in the North Kaibab Ranger District and two in the Williams Ranger District.

- Kanab Creek Wilderness (North Kaibab Ranger District)
- Kendrick Mountain Wilderness (Williams Ranger District) (partly in Coconino NF)
- Saddle Mountain Wilderness (North Kaibab Ranger District)
- Sycamore Canyon Wilderness (Williams Ranger District) (partly in Prescott NF and in Coconino NF)

== Attractions ==
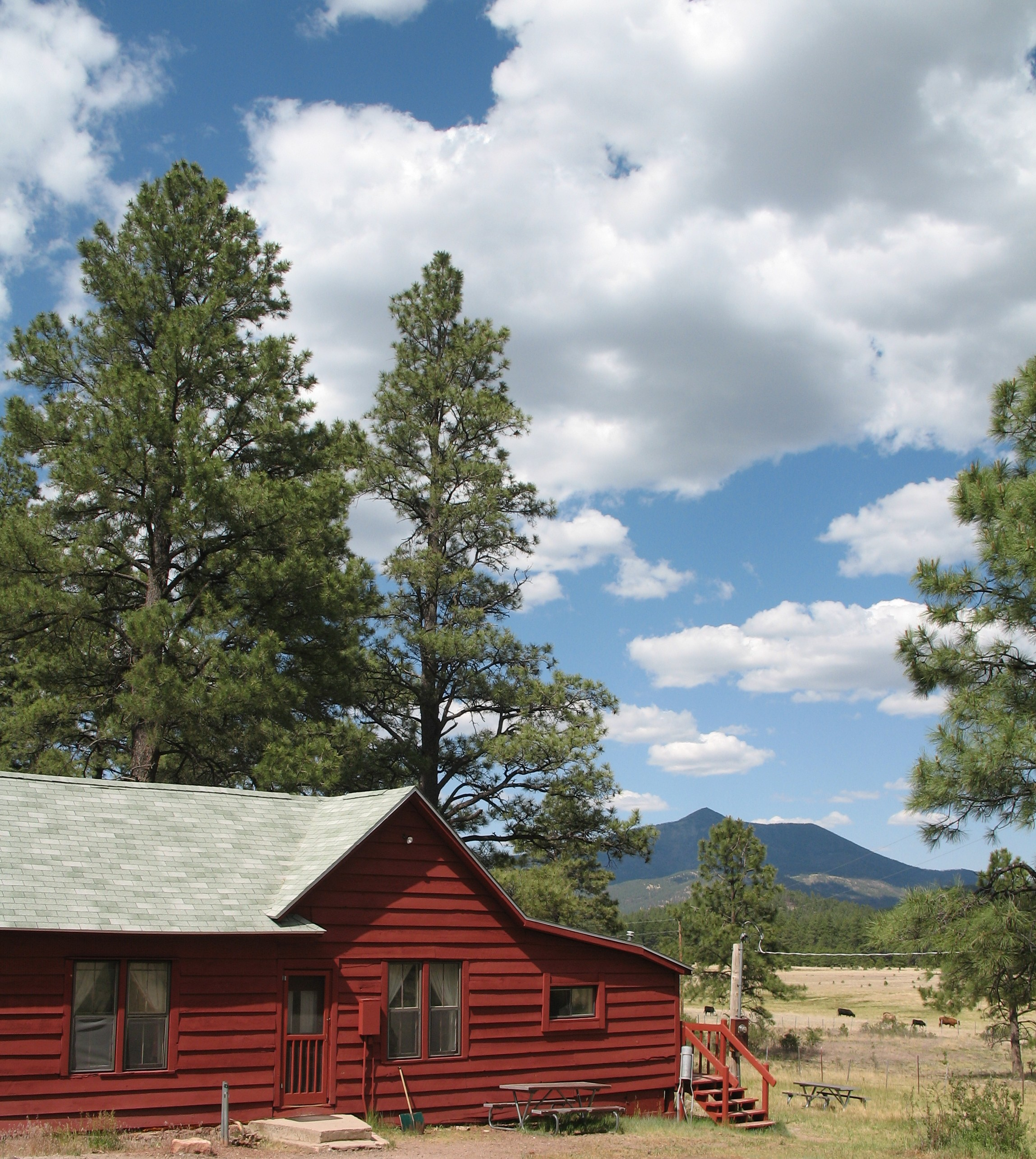
Historic Spring Valley Cabin

The historic Spring Valley Cabin, near Parks, Arizona in the Williams Ranger District, is available for rentals through the "Rooms with a View" Arizona Cabin Rental Program. The cabin was built in 1917. It served as the residence for rangers who worked at the guard station. The bunkhouse was the original office.

Located one mile south of the Grand Canyon, Hull Cabin is the oldest surviving historic cabin near the Grand Canyon’s south rim. This rustic cabin was built in 1889 as part of a sheep ranch, and was acquired by the Forest Service in 1907 for use as a ranger station. In 1985, the cabin was listed in the National Register of Historic Places. Hull Cabin is also available for rentals through the "Rooms with a View" program.

A three-acre fishing facility, Perkins Tank is a blue ribbon trout fishing area. The tank was recently drained because of illegal green sunfish stocking.

== See also ==
- Dogtown Reservoir
- Keyhole Sink
- Sycamore Canyon (Yavapai County, Arizona)
- List of national forests of the United States
