= Downtown Flagstaff, Arizona =

District in the city of Flagstaff

Coordinates: 35°11′53″N 111°38′46″W

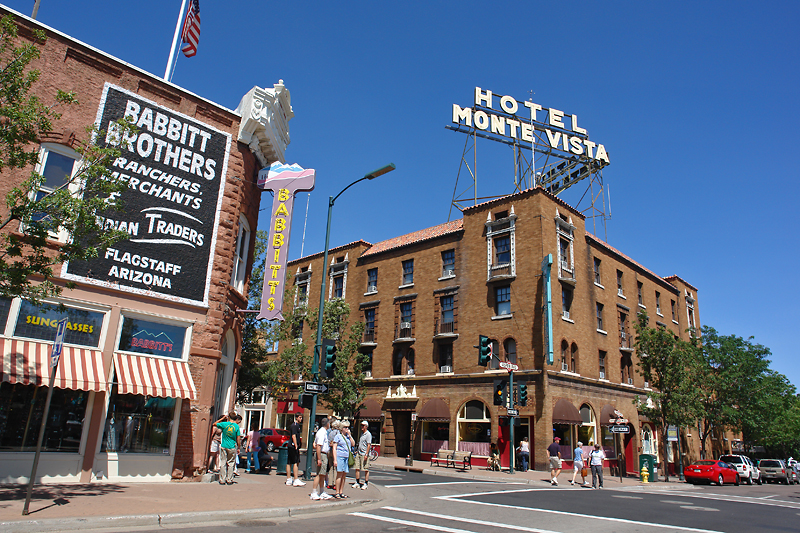
Babbitt Brothers Building and Hotel Monte Vista

Downtown Flagstaff, Arizona sits in the western part of the city, and consists of several culturally-connected blocks. The city of Flagstaff has a downtown culture of local, independent stores inside historic buildings.

== Location ==
Flagstaff's historic downtown is a "narrow and slender" area between the Northern Arizona University (NAU) campus at its south and the Museum of Northern Arizona at the north.

== Architecture ==
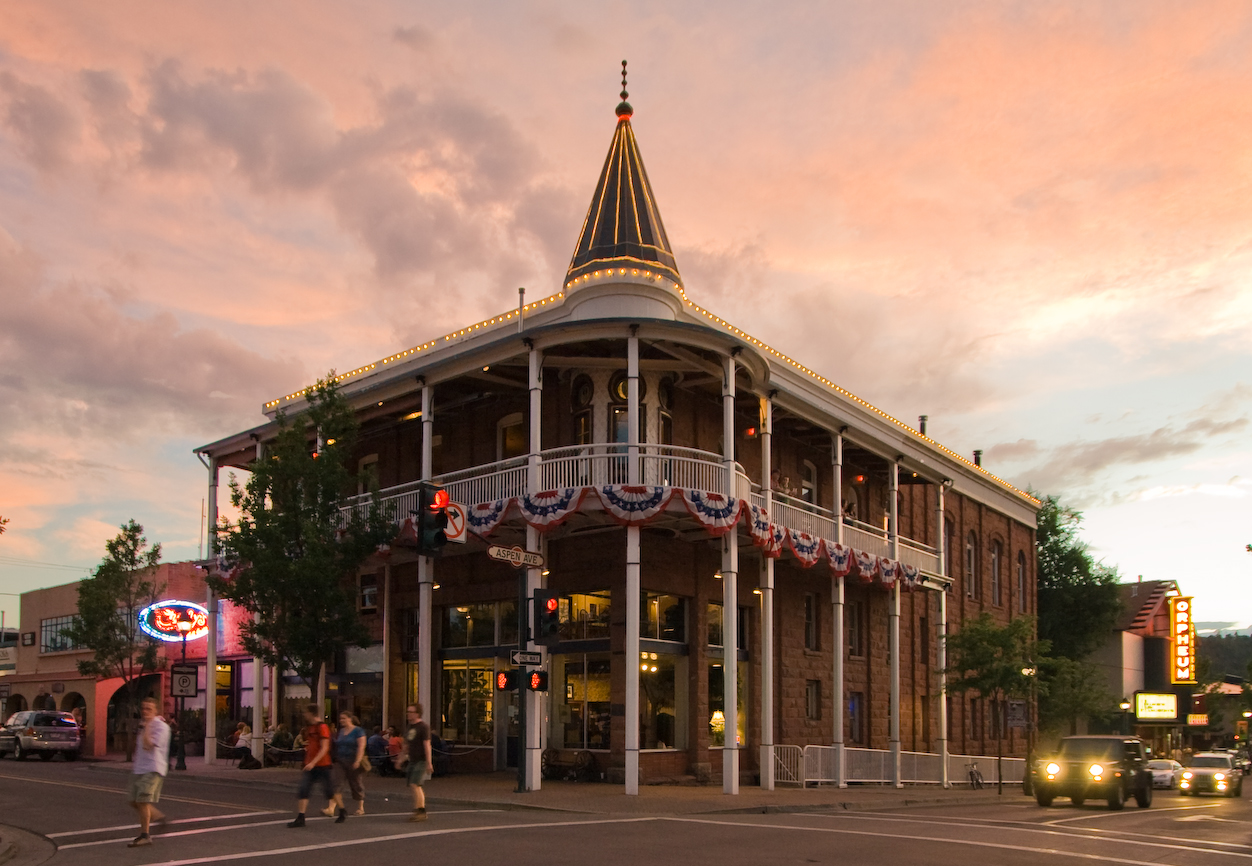
The Weatherford Hotel in 2007; Charly's is on the left and the Orpheum is on the right.

Architecturally, many of the buildings are historic, with stucco friezes; some stand out in the cityscape more than others, including the 1888 Babbitt Brothers building, the 1926 train station, and the Weatherford Hotel with its "grand two-story wraparound veranda and its sunroom". The train station serves as a visitors center, remaining the heart of Flagstaff's economy after originally bringing prosperity in by the railroad; both of the city's train depots were restored in the 1990s. Paradis describes the main station, which is an example of Tudor Revival architecture, (Note: Paradis writes that most of the Santa Fe railroad's depots being constructed at the time followed Spanish architectural styles to match them to their southwestern landscape, while the Tudor Revival style was intended to reflect Flagstaff as a mountain town.) as "probably the most prominent landmark in Flagstaff", adding that it "has further been described as perhaps the most unique architectural piece in town". Santa Fe Plaza, with the old depot, lies across the road a few hundred yards east of the visitors center/1926 station and includes a bronze sculpture of a railroad worker known as "Gandy Dancer" and an old locomotive.

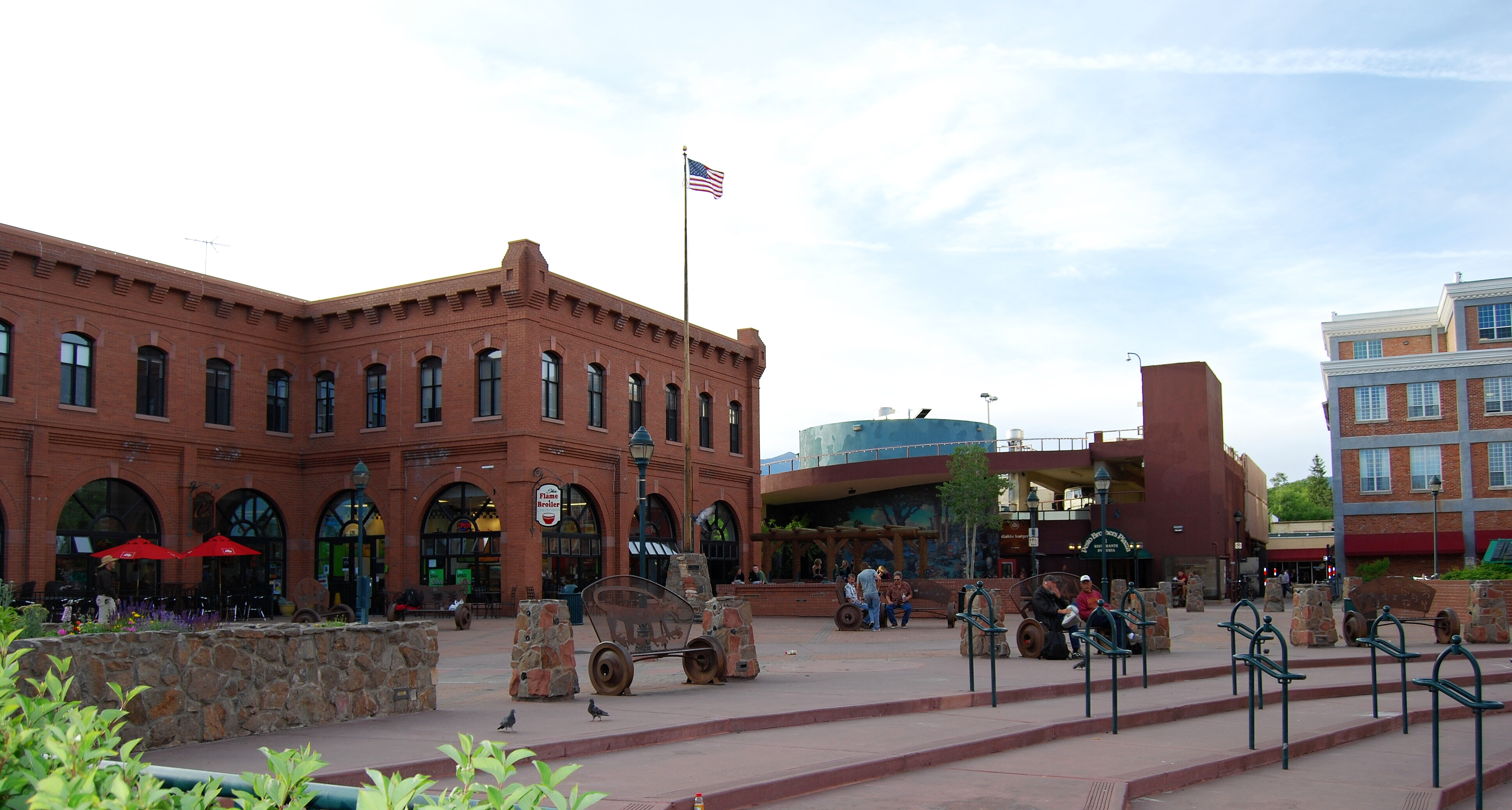
Heritage Square in 2008

A few blocks north of the train depots, turning west into East Aspen Avenue, is Heritage Square. Before the square was built, it had been a dirt tract from the demolition of historic Flagstaff buildings, including the Empress Theater – this name is written across an amphitheater in the square. Also on the square is a modern retail building that is a reconstruction of Flagstaff's original city hall, which had once sat a block south before being demolished in the 1970s. Paradis describes the square as "a celebratory railroad-oriented theme park", which he suggest Santa Fe Plaza can also be seen as. In human geography, he suggests that these are places designed by white males from a "perspective that cherishes the values of progress, technology, expansion, and economic growth"; he writes that while there are other elements of Flagstaff's heritage present (including rock strata of the Grand Canyon), the overwhelming theme is the Santa Fe railroad, reflecting Anglo-American expansionism and not representing the Native perspective. Heritage Square's design was largely influenced by Jim Babbitt, a local history activist and another original Babbitt descendant, with Paradis also acknowledging that with a wider selection of urban architects, Flagstaff is a population that may embrace more diverse perspectives in its cultural representations. When the city council bought the land from a broke developer in 1991, it was seen as an "opportunity to turn downtown into a beautiful area, something it [hadn't] been for the past 25 years".

The Babbitt Brothers Building from 1888, the city's first two-story building and a simplified Italianate architecture construction with "tall, arched windows and [a] heavy, bracketed cornice on its roofline", was restored to its original appearance in the 1990s after cladding applied in the 1950s and '60s hid the facade. It is also a downtown landmark, in appearance and in its historic function as the anchor to the district's success: a department store, smaller businesses nearby relied on its appeal to catch customers already in the area, as well as being a familiar name and a community social fixture with nearly 100 years of trading. It sits at the corner of North San Francisco Street and East Aspen Avenue, a few blocks directly north of the train depots (San Francisco Street bisects the railroad plazas) and just east on East Aspen Avenue from Heritage Square. The demolition of part of the building revealed the Empress Theater's shell and was part inspiration for Heritage Square.

A block north of Heritage Square on the east side of downtown is the old Coconino County Courthouse. Built when Coconino first became a county, this building has served as the political hub since 1895. Despite its importance in administering the second-largest county of the United States, it was "shoved aside" to a random city block during planning, as the grid for downtown had not considered institutional buildings, but was still "by far the most elaborate structure in Flagstaff". It is an example of Romanesque Revival architecture, but the "small-town version", featuring "heavy masonry construction, cavernous window and door openings, an impressive square tower, [and] round-arched windows that reflect the Roman architecture of Europe", with the arched entryway "probably its most distinguishing architectural feature". In 1956, a modern International Style addition to the building was added, which was contentious from the start not only in style but also for clashing in style with the rest of the city; it was replaced.

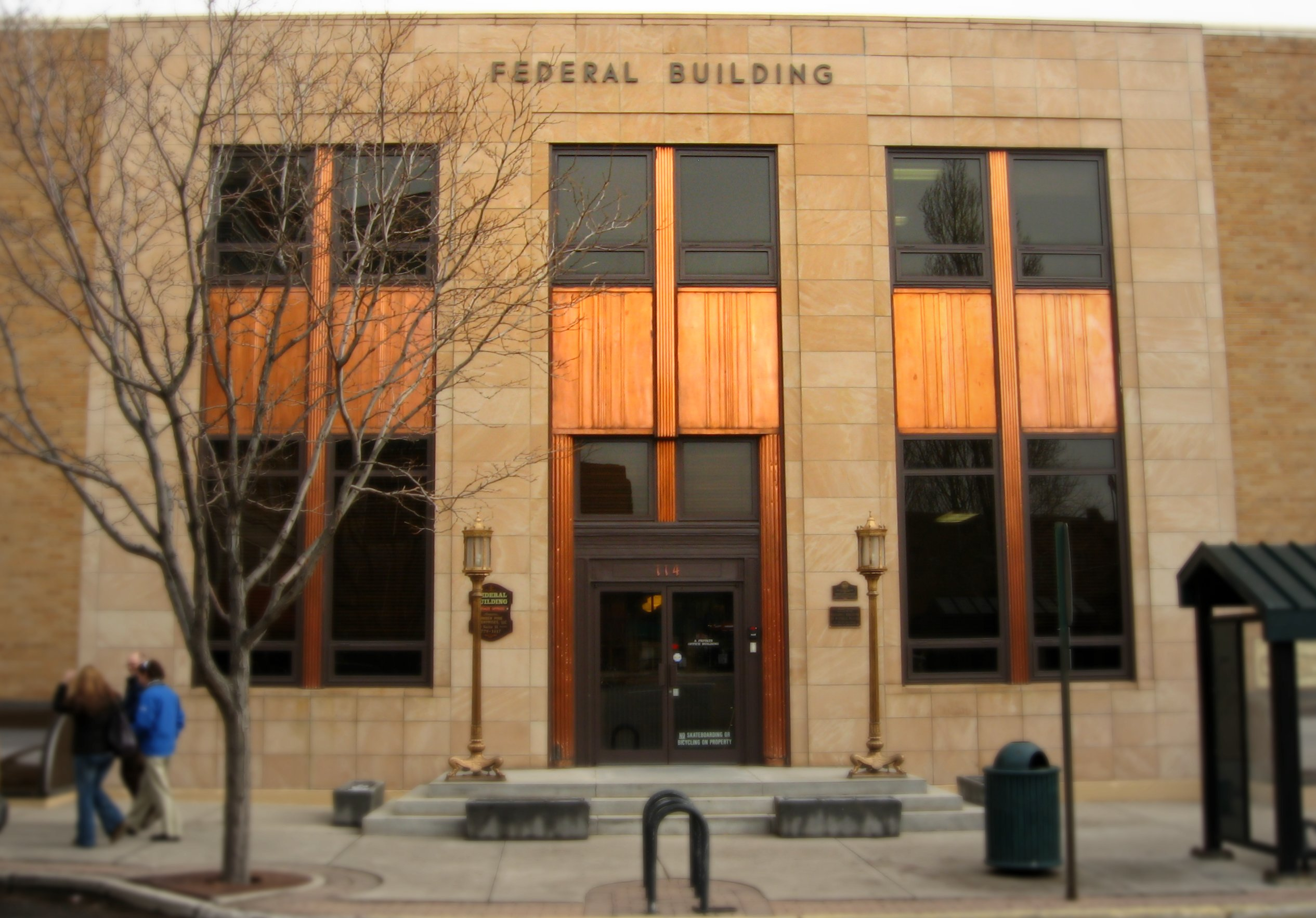
Art Deco architecture of the Federal Building

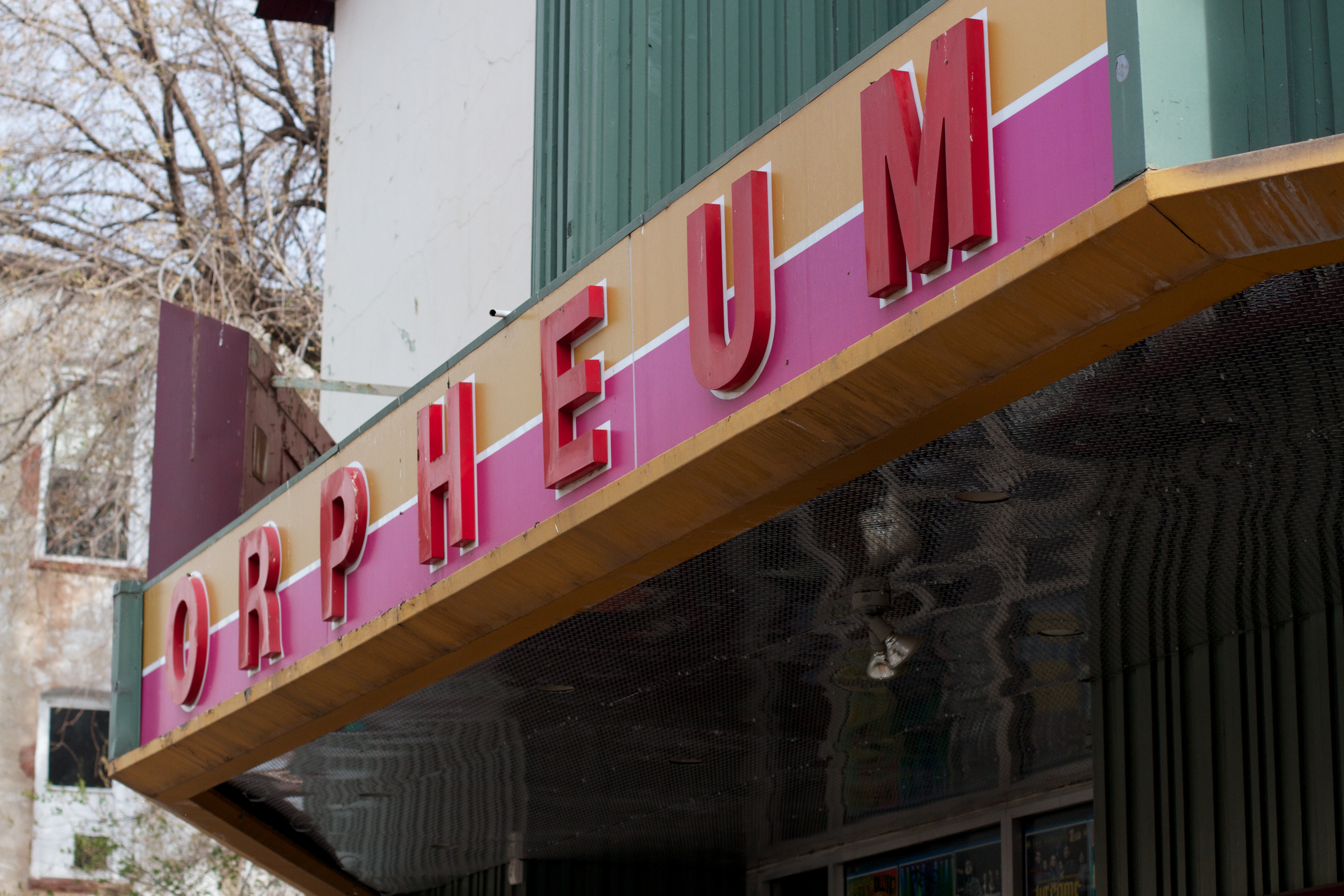
The late-20th century facade of the Orpheum Theater

Just west from Heritage Square and across the intersection at Aspen Avenue and North Leroux Street is the Weatherford Hotel and Orpheum Theater. The Orpheum originally had a Neoclassical facade before receiving modern upgrades that still remain, though retro in appearance in the 21st century, unlike other buildings downtown that have seen restoration.

Other 20th century styles in downtown include the Art Deco of the Federal Building on San Francisco Street. At the edge of downtown, on the block southeast of the old Courthouse, is "the closest thing to a skyscraper that can be found in Flagstaff"; it is five stories tall but impedes on the aesthetic of the rest of the area. Built in the early 1960s, it represents the end of Flagstaff's downtown development.

== Culture ==
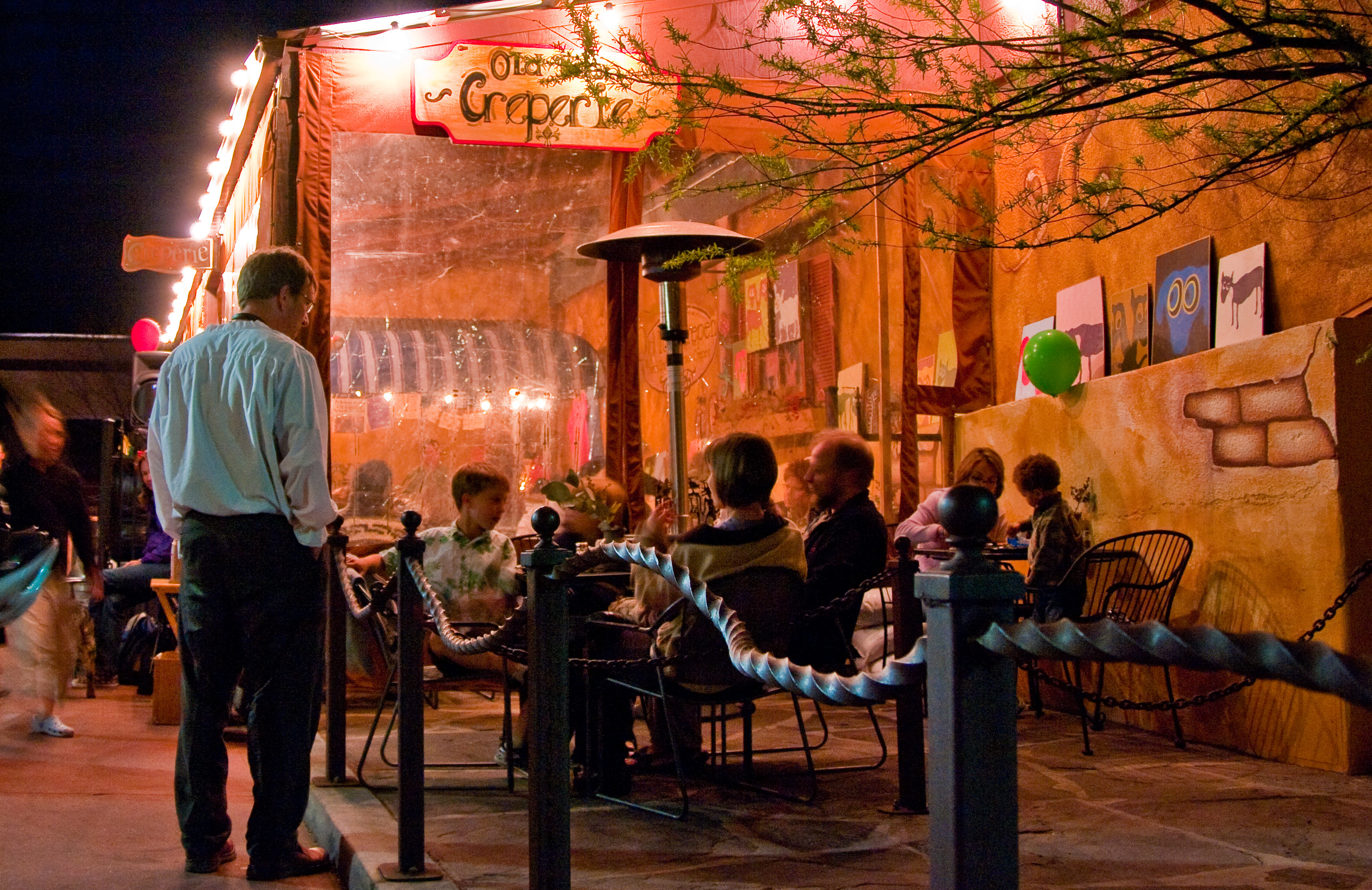
Café culture in downtown Flagstaff

As a smaller city, Flagstaff maintains a "central business district that exists at a more human scale and [relies] more on independent local and regional business entrepreneurs" in its downtown area. DK writes that "it is a lively, easy-going place with a good selection of bars and restaurants among the maze of old red-brick buildings".

Many of the historic buildings of downtown contain cafés, thanks to the city's "lively café society", which DK attributes to the young student population from NAU. On one side of the Weatherford Hotel is Charly's, a restaurant and bar housed in the hotel that is "a popular social venue" for NAU students and other residents, with the hotel itself only regaining popularity in the 1980s (after housing mentally disabled patients) when a café was opened on the first floor. In the 21st century, the building is a functional hotel again. The Weatherford is "a centerpiece in the downtown district", and the Orpheum next to it "represents a typical small-town theater located in the heart of downtown". Originally a movie theater, the Orpheum no longer serves this function (the only movie theater in the city is a Harkins in East Flagstaff) but is instead a traditional concert venue.

Heritage Square is "one of Flagstaff's most popular public spaces" and contains an array of built-in links to the area's past. Much of Flagstaff's downtown follows a similar cultural trend, with businesses and residents alike "increasingly applying themes and images to the landscape in an attempt to enhance the local sense of place". The downtown area is reflective of Flagstaff's culture, rather than economic industry; when the city was choosing sites for its visitors center, the citizens rejected anywhere that was not downtown, so that it would "reflect Flagstaff, not Walmart".

== See also ==
- Railroad Addition Historic District (Flagstaff, Arizona)
