= National Register of Historic Places listings in Kingman County, Kansas =

Location of Kingman County in Kansas

This is a list of the National Register of Historic Places listings in Kingman County, Kansas.

This is intended to be a complete list of the properties on the National Register of Historic Places in Kingman County, Kansas, United States. The locations of National Register properties for which the latitude and longitude coordinates are included below, may be seen in a map.

There are 8 properties listed on the National Register in the county.

This National Park Service list is complete through NPS recent listings posted March 21, 2025.

== Current listings ==
	Name on the Register	Image	Date listed	Location	City or town	Description
1	Kingman Carnegie Library	Kingman Carnegie Library	June 25, 1987 (#87000955)	455 N. Main; 37°38′45″N 98°06′47″W	Kingman	
2	Kingman City Building	Kingman City Building	April 13, 1972 (#72000506)	Main St. and C Ave. 37°38′43″N 98°06′45″W	Kingman	Built in 1888, housed the city offices, jail, and fire house. Architects, Proudfoot & Bird of Wichita.
3	Kingman County Courthouse	Kingman County Courthouse	September 11, 1985 (#85002128)	120 Spruce St. 37°38′34″N 98°06′40″W	Kingman	
4	Kingman National Guard Armory	Kingman National Guard Armory	July 7, 2004 (#04000666)	111 S. Main St. 37°38′26″N 98°06′49″W	Kingman	
5	Kingman Santa Fe Depot	Kingman Santa Fe Depot	October 11, 2001 (#01001091)	201 East Sherman; 37°38′30″N 98°06′42″W	Kingman	Built in 1911, the railroad tracks parallel Sherman Street, the brick structure is Mission Revival with a tile roof.
6	Charles M. Prather Barn	Charles M. Prather Barn	October 31, 2002 (#02001263)	NW 30th St. and NW 60th Ave. 37°41′22″N 98°13′42″W	Kingman	Barn, c.1938, uniquely made with recycled metal. Has a prominent hay hood.
7	US Post Office-Kingman	US Post Office-Kingman	October 17, 1989 (#89001645)	425 N. Main St. 37°38′44″N 98°06′46″W	Kingman	
8	Louis Werner Barn		December 22, 2020 (#100005952)	4550 NE 80th Ave. 37°42′48″N 97°58′19″W	Pretty Prairie	Barn built in 1912

== Former listing ==
	Name on the Register	Image	Date listed	Date removed	Location	City or town	Description
1	Doney-Clark House		May 6, 1994 (#94000409)	January 8, 2014	817 W. Sherman St. 37°38′31″N 98°06′47″W	Kingman	Demolished in 2003

== See also ==
- List of National Historic Landmarks in Kansas
- National Register of Historic Places listings in Kansas
