= Kingman station =

Historic train station in Kingman, Arizona

Kingman, AZ
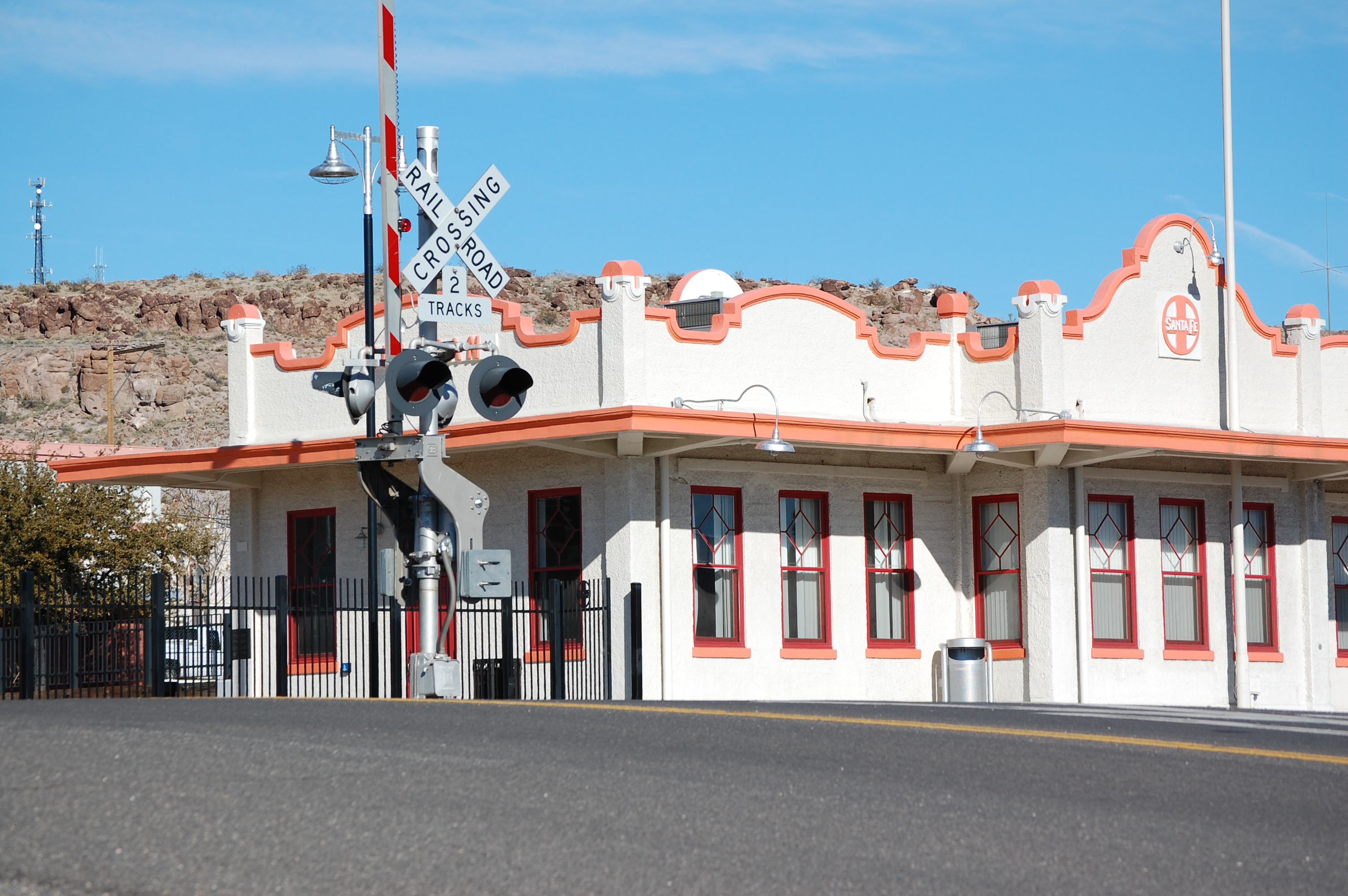

General information
- Location: 400 East Andy Devine Avenue; Kingman, Arizona
- Coordinates: 35.1882°N 114.0526°W
- Line: BNSF Seligman Subdivision
- Platforms: 1 side platform
- Tracks: 2
- Connections: Amtrak Thruway; Vegas Airporter

Other information
- Station code: Amtrak: KNG

History
- Opened: 1907

Passengers
- FY 2025: 9,776 (Amtrak)

Services
Preceding station	Amtrak	Following station
Needles toward Los Angeles	Southwest Chief	Flagstaff toward Chicago
Former services
Preceding station	Amtrak	Following station
Needles toward Los Angeles	Southwest Chief	Williams Junction Closed 2018 toward Chicago
Preceding station	Atchison, Topeka and Santa Fe Railway	Following station
Yucca toward Los Angeles	Main Line	Hackberry toward Chicago
- Atchison, Topeka and Santa Fe Railroad Depot
- U.S. Historic district – Contributing property
- Architectural style: Spanish/Mission Revival
- Part of: Kingman Commercial Historic District (ID86001153)
- MPS: Kingman MRA
- Added to NRHP: May 14, 1986
Location

Kingman station is an Amtrak train station located in the historic Kingman Railroad Depot in Kingman, Arizona, United States. Amtrak's Southwest Chief trains stop at the Kingman station once daily in each direction. Kingman is also the transfer point for dedicated, guaranteed Amtrak Thruway service to/from Laughlin, Nevada and Las Vegas, Nevada.

This station has an enclosed waiting room, but is unstaffed. There are no ticket agents or Quik-Trak kiosks on site.

Of the eight Arizona stations served by Amtrak (in 2020), Kingman was the third-busiest in fiscal year 2020, boarding or detraining 5,536 passengers in 2020.

== History ==
The Atchison, Topeka and Santa Fe Railway (ATSF) built the depot in 1907. The station's elevation is 3,335 feet (1,017 m) above sea level. The station has been a contributing property to the Kingman Commercial Historic District, which has been on the National Register of Historic Places since 1986. Like many depots constructed by the ATSF, the building exhibits characteristics of the Spanish Colonial Revival style of architecture, particularly in the roofline's curvilinear gables. In early 2011, the city of Kingman finished a multi-year restoration of the depot. The work was funded in part through a $471,500 federal Transportation Enhancements grant and approximately $150,000 in federal Community Development Block Grants. Following the rehabilitation, the depot houses a passenger waiting room and a railroad museum.

The depot is the third station in Kingman, and is built of poured concrete. The first station was destroyed by fire, as was the 1901-built "fire proof" one, which burned to the ground in 1906.

It is served by Amtrak's Southwest Chief's 2,256 miles (3,631 km) route from Chicago, Illinois, to Los Angeles, California, with one eastbound and one westbound stop daily.

== See also ==
- Kingman Santa Fe Depot, Kingman, Kansas
