= Railroad Addition Historic District =

Railroad Addition Historic District may refer to:

- Railroad Addition Historic District (Flagstaff, Arizona), listed on the National Register of Historic Places in Coconino County, Arizona
- Railroad Addition Historic District (Red Cloud, Nebraska), listed on the National Register of Historic Places in Webster County, Nebraska
