= Anderson Barn (Johnstown, Colorado) =

- U.S. National Register of Historic Places
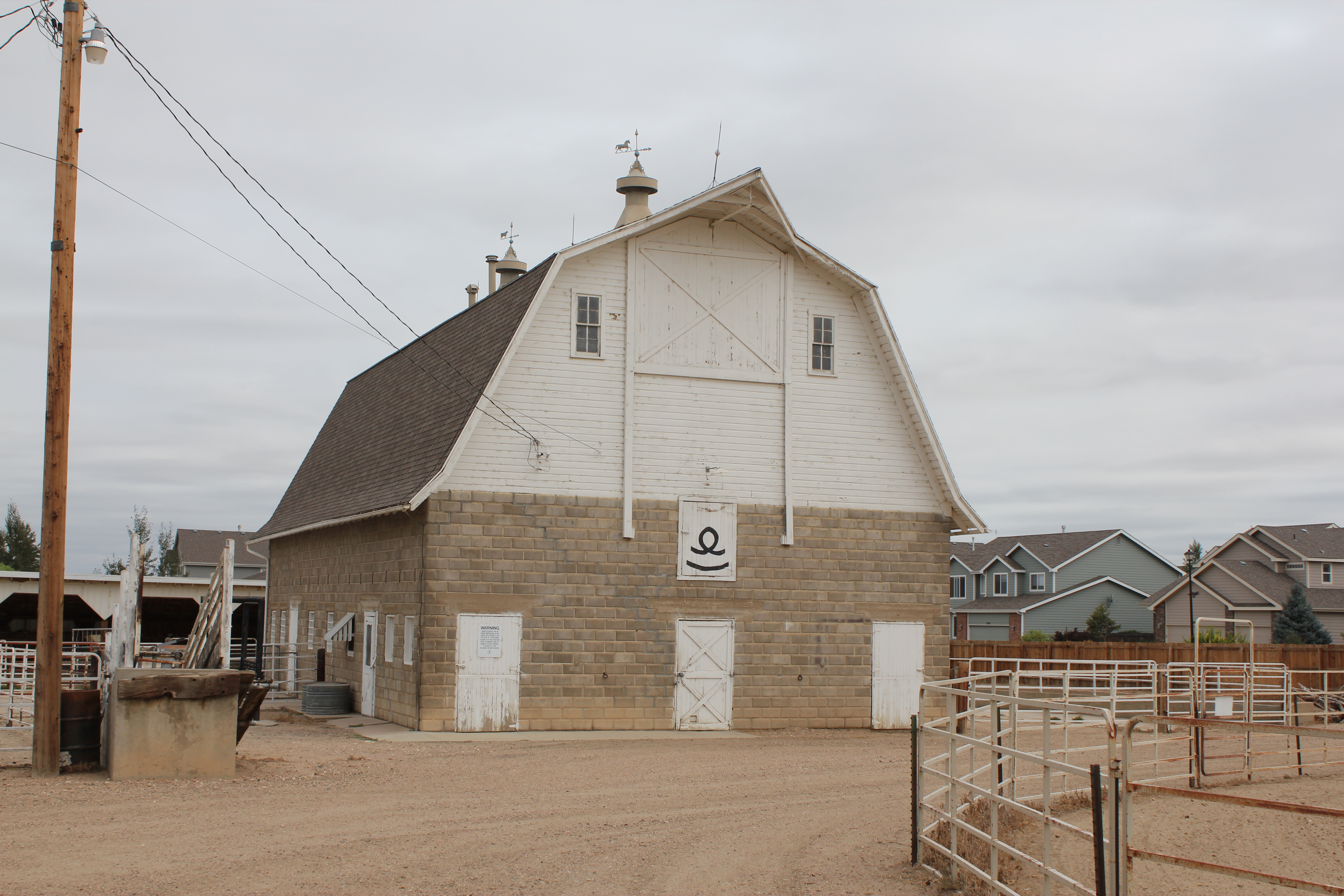

- Location within Colorado
- Location: 5255 CO 60, Johnstown, Colorado
- Coordinates: 40.3365°N 104.9555°W
- Area: less than one acre
- Built: 1913
- Built by: Albert Anderson; C.E. Carlson
- Architectural style: Gambrel-roofed barn
- MPS: Ornamental Concrete Block Buildings in Colorado MPS
- NRHP reference No.: 04001112
- Added to NRHP: October 6, 2004

The Anderson Barn near Johnstown in Weld County, Colorado, also known as the Carlson Barn, is a gambrel-roofed ornamental block building built in 1913. It was listed on the National Register of Historic Places in 2004.

It is about 25 by 70 feet (7.6 m × 21.3 m) in plan. It has walls built of plain-faced ornamental blocks. Its gambrel roof, covered in asphalt shingles in 2004, has two large metal ventilators and a hay hood projecting out the ridge on the south side.

It was deemed "an excellent example of a gambrel-roofed barn using plain-faced ornamental concrete block for its lower level." It might have been built from a kit, as might be sold by "mail-order firms as Sears, Roebuck and Company, Montgomery Ward, and the Aladdin Company. The blocks were to be made on-site with a hand-operated machine supplied in the kit. The remainder of the materials (cement, lumber, roofing, windows and hardware) were shipped by rail to the nearest siding. Local contractors or property owners fabricated the blocks, laid the masonry walls and then built the frame interior and roof structure."

It is located in a cluster of farm buildings to the north of Colorado State Highway 60, about .2 miles (0.32 km) due east of the eastern end of Johnstown Reservoir. The other buildings include a seed shed, a livestock shed, and two poured-concrete silos.

Albert Anderson, who immigrated from Sweden in 1912, purchased the property. He, C.E. "Cement" Carlson, and four young Russian immigrants built the barn, with blocks that were individually formed using a hand cement mixer.

"The barn originally accommodated draft horse stalls and family milk cows. The loft was used for the storage of hay and straw.The barn has been well maintained throughout the years. About ten years ago the building was re- shingled by Ray Ezinga, a contractor from Loveland, Colorado. The work cost $6,000. Two years ago a painter from Loveland painted the barn and other buildings, including the machine, seed, and livestock sheds, for a total cost of $5,200."

Melvin Carlson and family members long participated in quarter horse shows. He is a member of the Rocky Mountain Quarter Horse Association and of the National Western Stock Show Livestock Association:

In 2002, the barn was nominated for the Barn Again! Farm Heritage Award sponsored by Successful Farming magazine and the National Trust for Historic Preservation. Melvin Carlson received a certificate of commendation "in recognition of outstanding efforts in preserving and maintaining America's Rural Heritage."

In 2004 the farm buildings' property is owned by Albert's grandson Melvin Carlson, although all but 10 acres (4.0 ha) of the farm's land was sold for development in 1999.
