= Charles M. Prather Barn =

- Prather, Charles M., Barn
- U.S. National Register of Historic Places
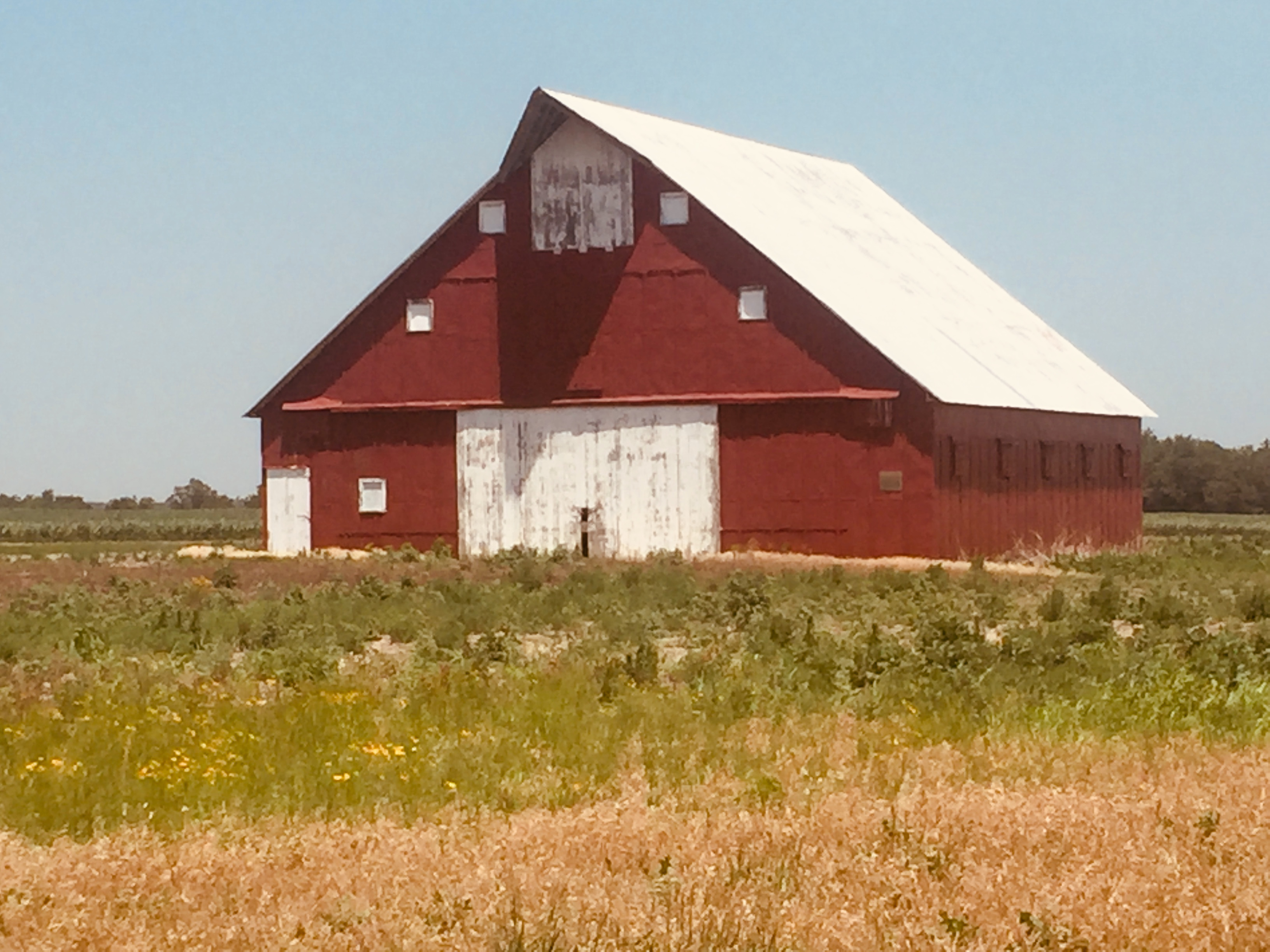
- Barn in 2022

- Location within Kansas Location within the United States
- Location: NW 30th St. and NW 60th Ave., near Kingman, Kansas
- Coordinates: 37°41′22″N 98°13′42″W
- Area: less than one acre
- Built: c.1938
- Built by: Charles M. Prather
- NRHP reference No.: 02001263
- Added to NRHP: October 31, 2002

The Charles M. Prather Barn, near Kingman, Kansas, was built in about 1938 by Charles M. Prather and local carpenters. It was listed on the National Register of Historic Places in 2002.

It is 52 by 60.5 feet (15.8 m × 18.4 m) in plan. It was built during the Depression out of materials salvaged from railroad refrigerator cars and from other railroad structures. Its interior walls and exterior siding was flooring of railroad cars. Railroad bridge timbers support the loft floor. Metal siding is from roofs of railroad cars.

It was deemed notable as "an excellent example of vernacular design, planned and built by its original owner and local workers. The barn's materials are unique in their ingenuity, salvaged from railroad yards in Wichita and assembled in the present location to create a one-of-a-kind structure that remains in near-original condition."

While many barns, especially for dairy cows, have repeated small windows, few have windows with heavy, metal, covers that can be locked.
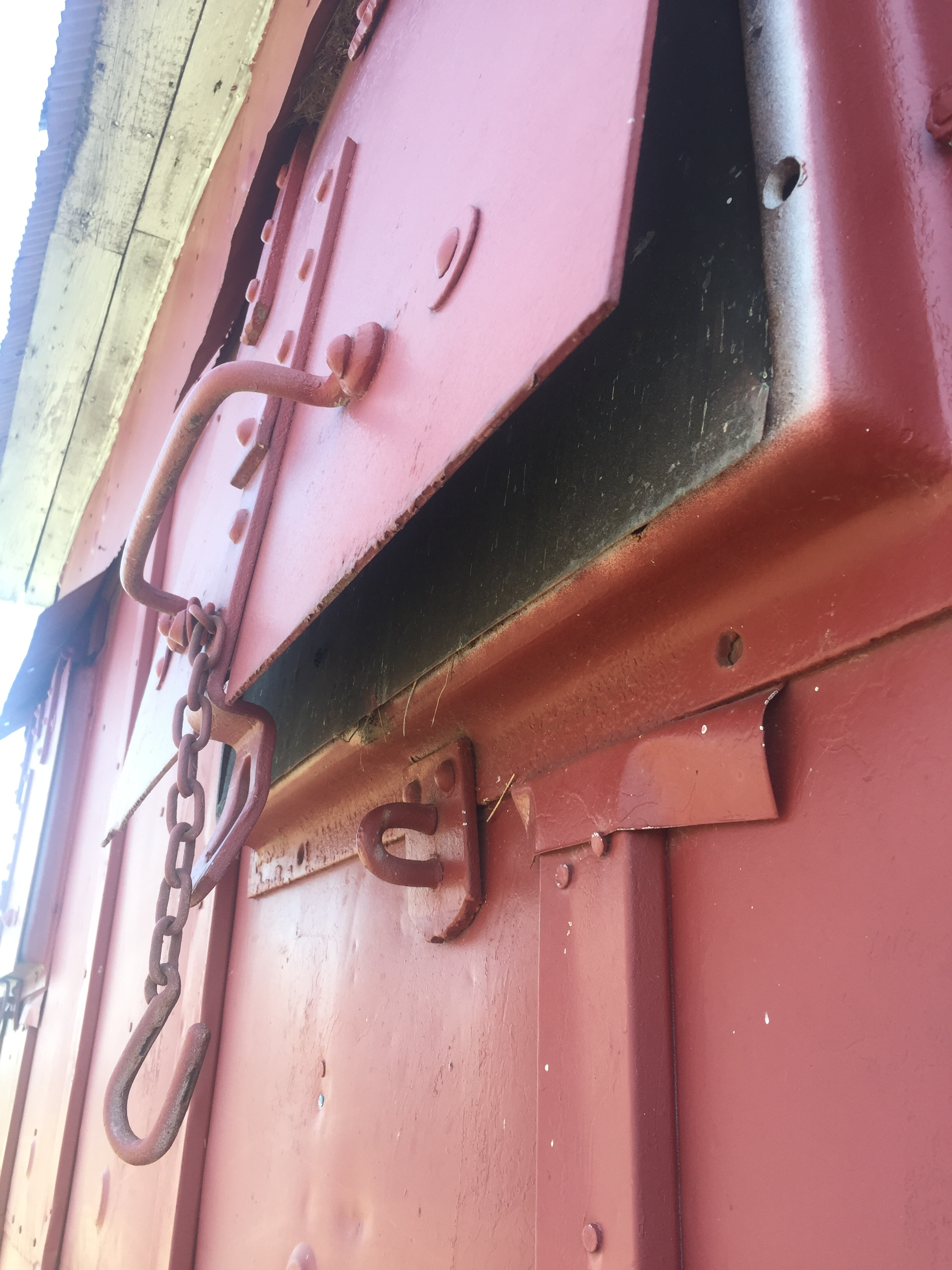
Individual window pulled slightly open

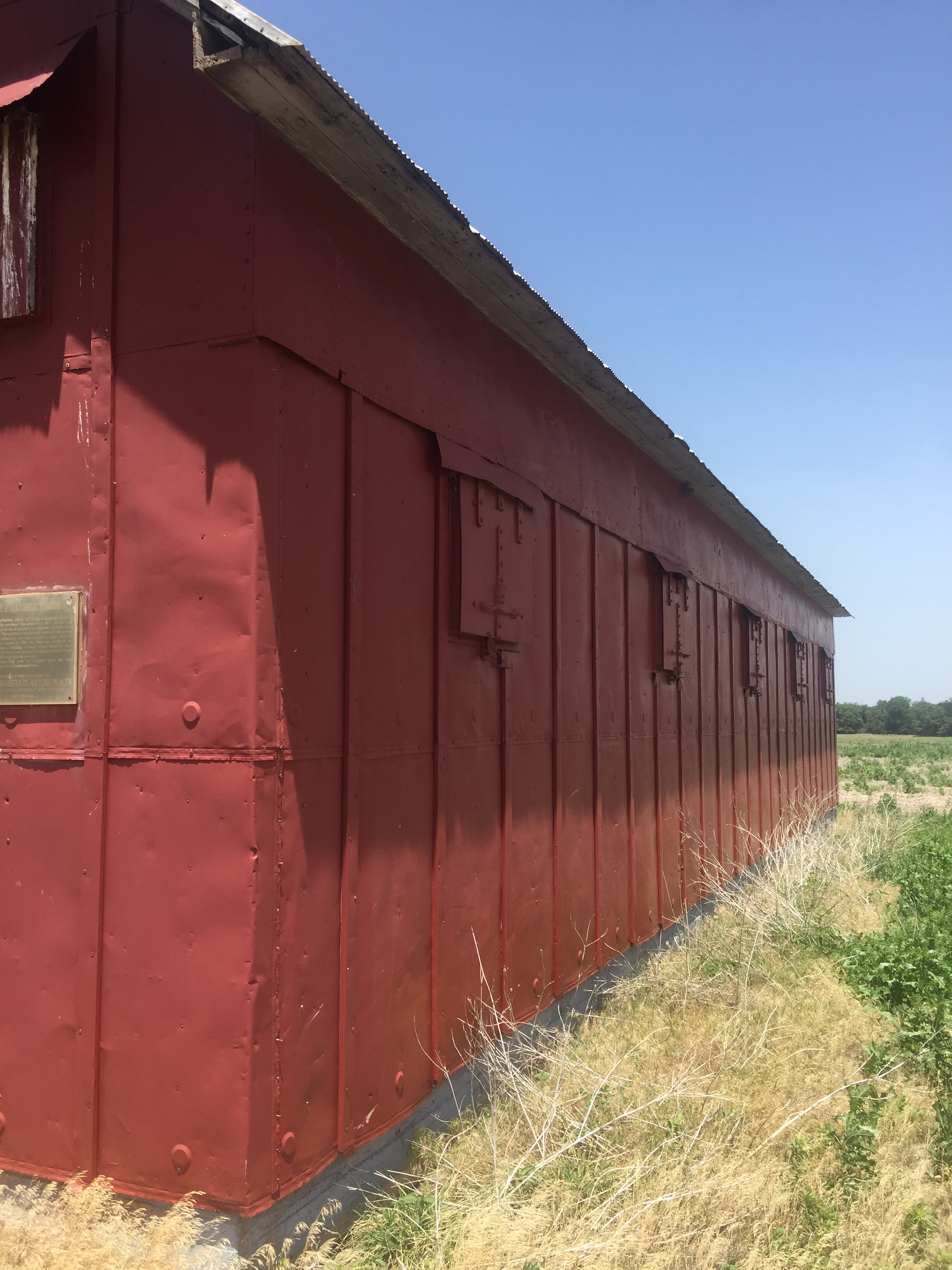
Row of windows

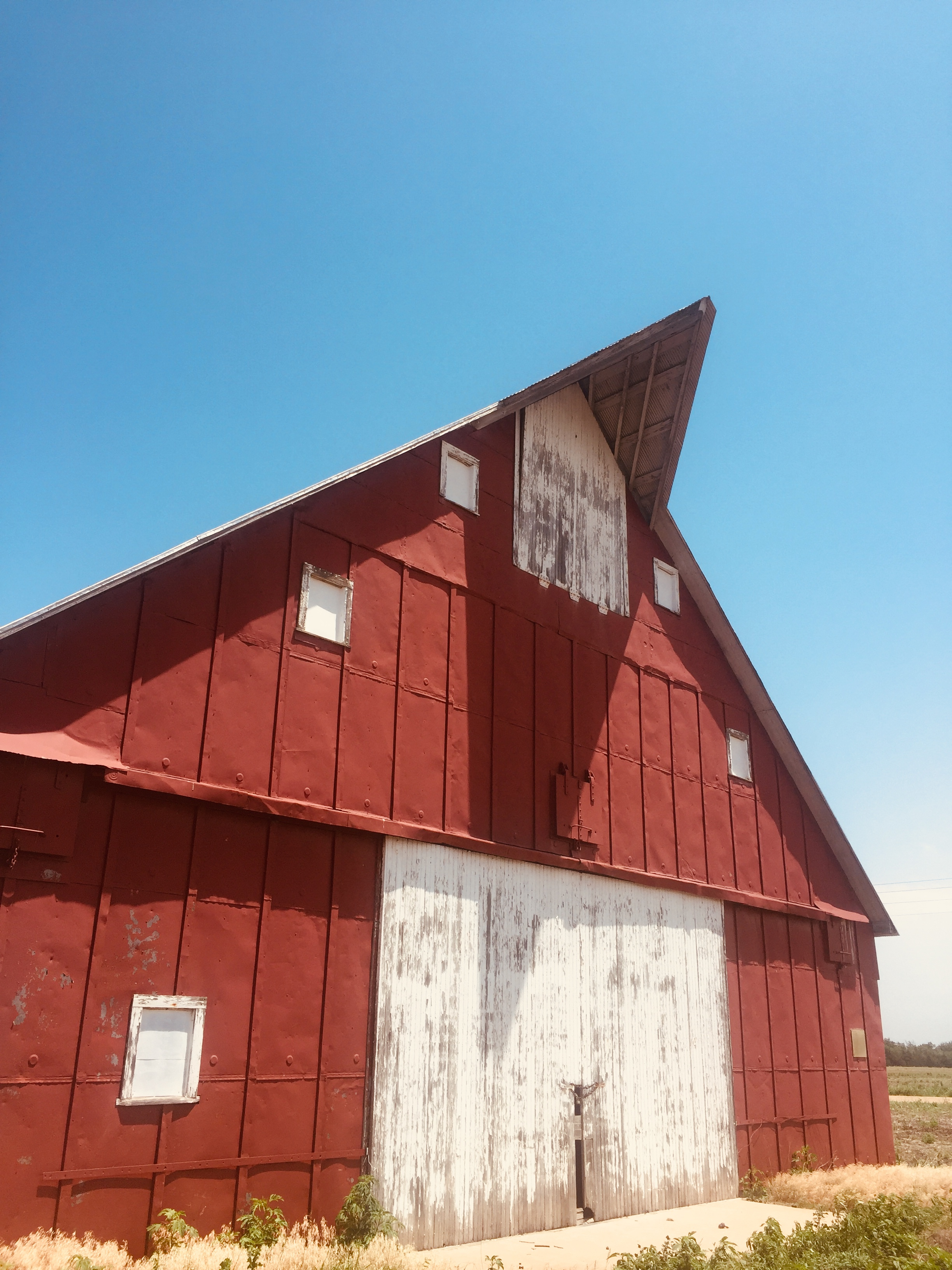
Hay hood from below

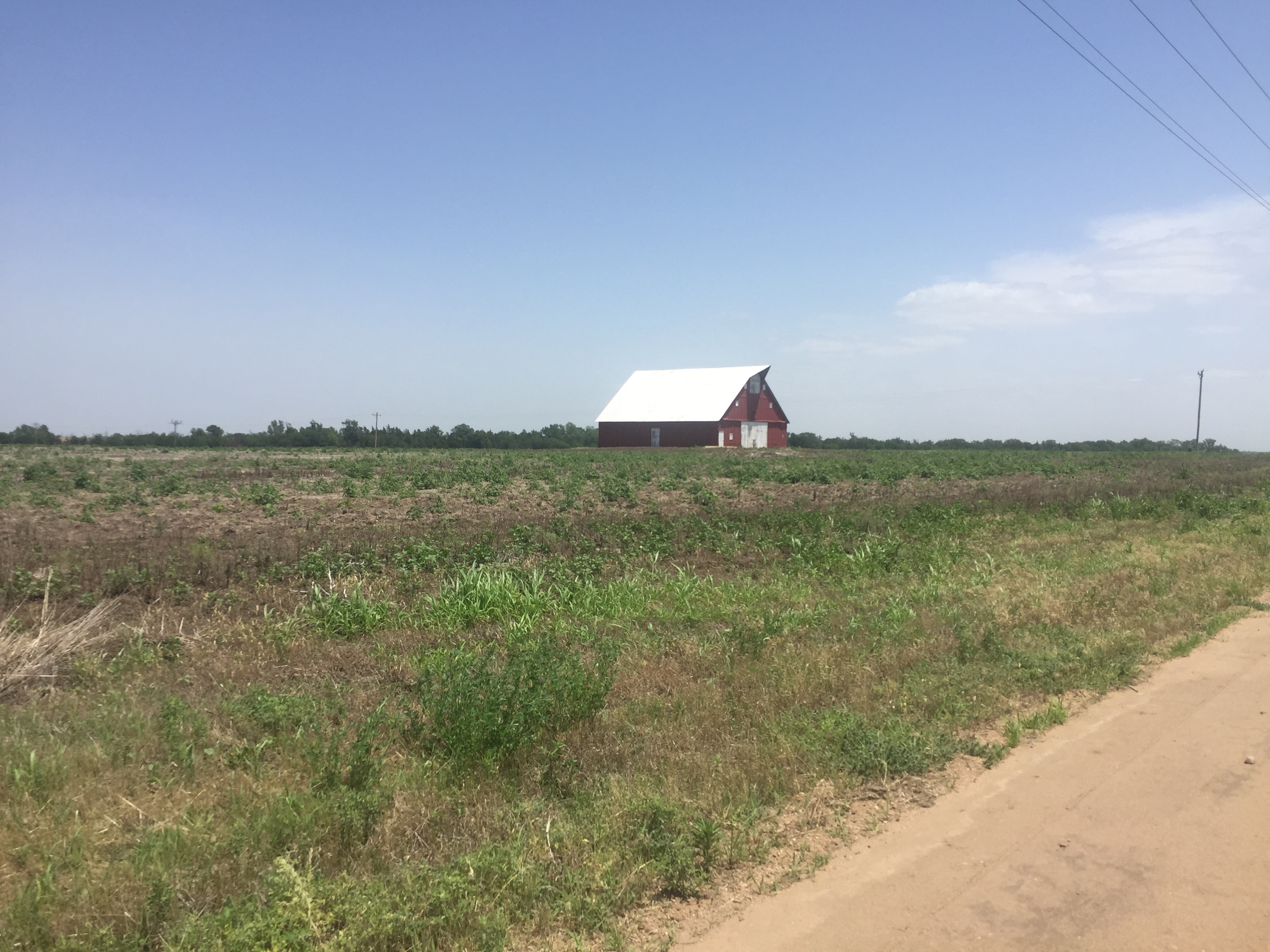
It stands alone.

The barn has a prominent hay hood.

== See also ==
- Louis Werner Barn, also NRHP-listed in Kingman County
