= Kingman Commercial Historic District =

United States historic area in Mohave County, Arizona

- U.S. National Register of Historic Places
- U.S. Historic district
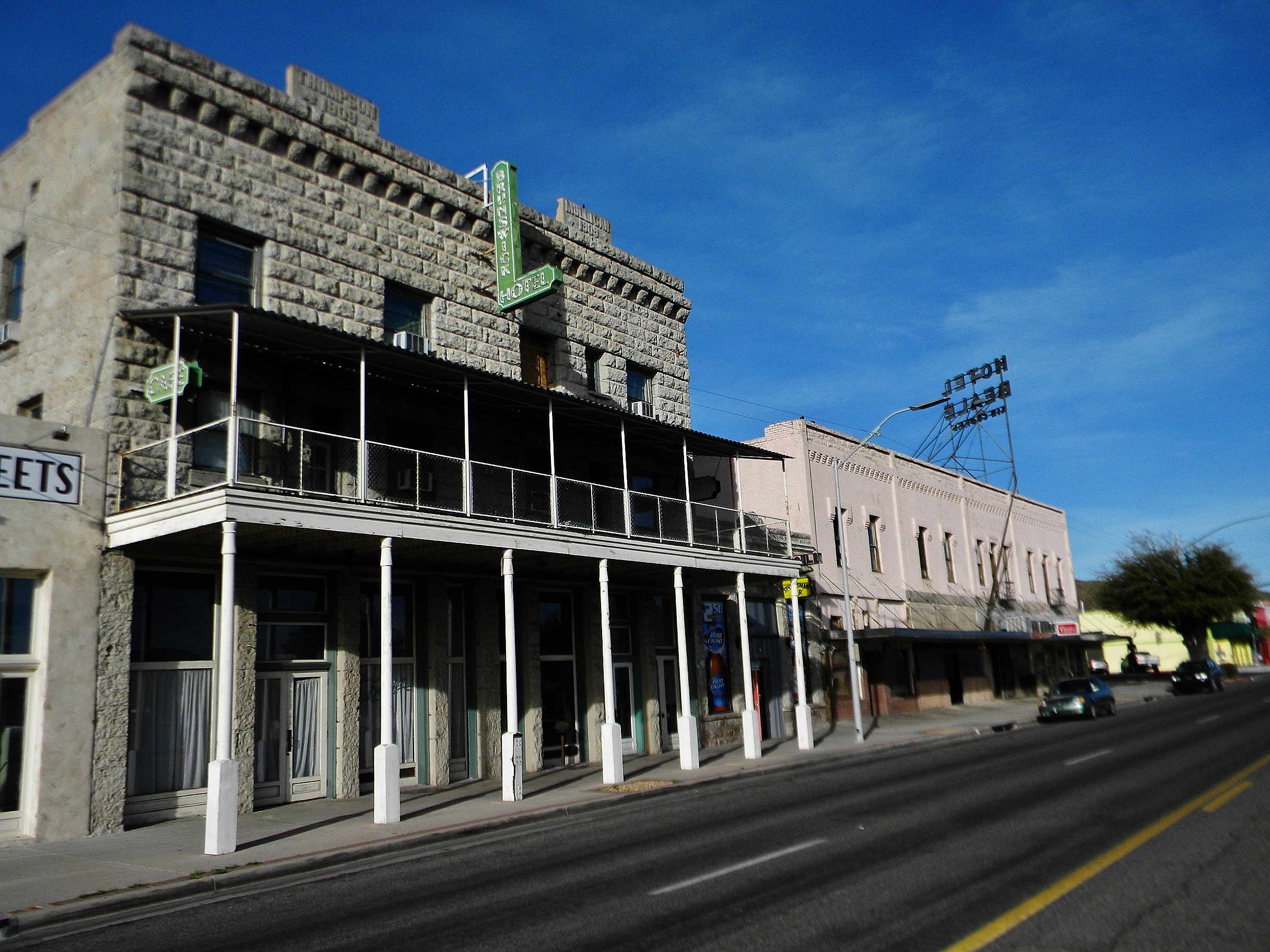

- Location within Arizona Location within the United States
- Location: 300 and 400 blocks of Andy Devine Ave., Kingman, Arizona
- Coordinates: 35°11′20″N 114°3′8″W
- Area: 4.5 acres (1.8 ha)
- Architect: Lescher, Royal W.; Et al.
- Architectural style: Moderne, Queen Anne, Mission/Spanish Revival
- MPS: Kingman MRA
- NRHP reference No.: 86001153
- Added to NRHP: May 14, 1986

The Kingman Commercial Historic District is a 4.5-acre (1.8 ha) historic district along the 300 and 400 blocks of Andy Devine Ave. in Kingman, Arizona. It was listed on the National Register of Historic Places in 1986. It includes seven contributing properties; it includes Moderne, Queen Anne, and Mission/Spanish Revival designed by W. Royal Lescher and others.

The district includes the Beale Hotel, the Brunswick Hotel, the 1906 Lovin Building, an AT&SF railroad depot, the Luthy Block building, and an archeological site. The Luthy Block was originally a "simple adobe building" but was expanded in 1908 with brick and was remodeled with Mission Revival parapets; these parapets were updated in c.1935 to Moderne motifs.

== Gallery ==
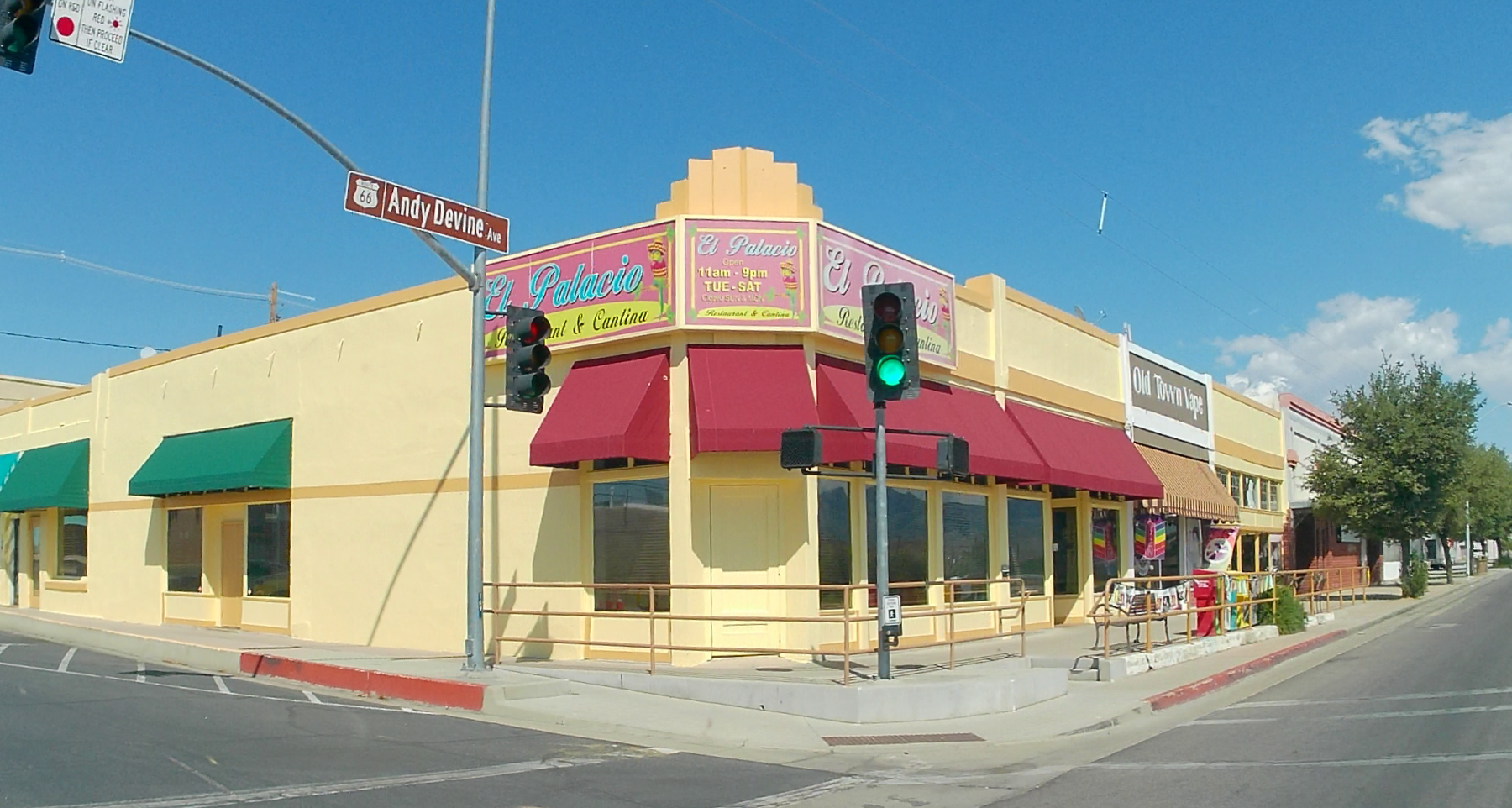
Luthy Block-Watkins Drug, 2022

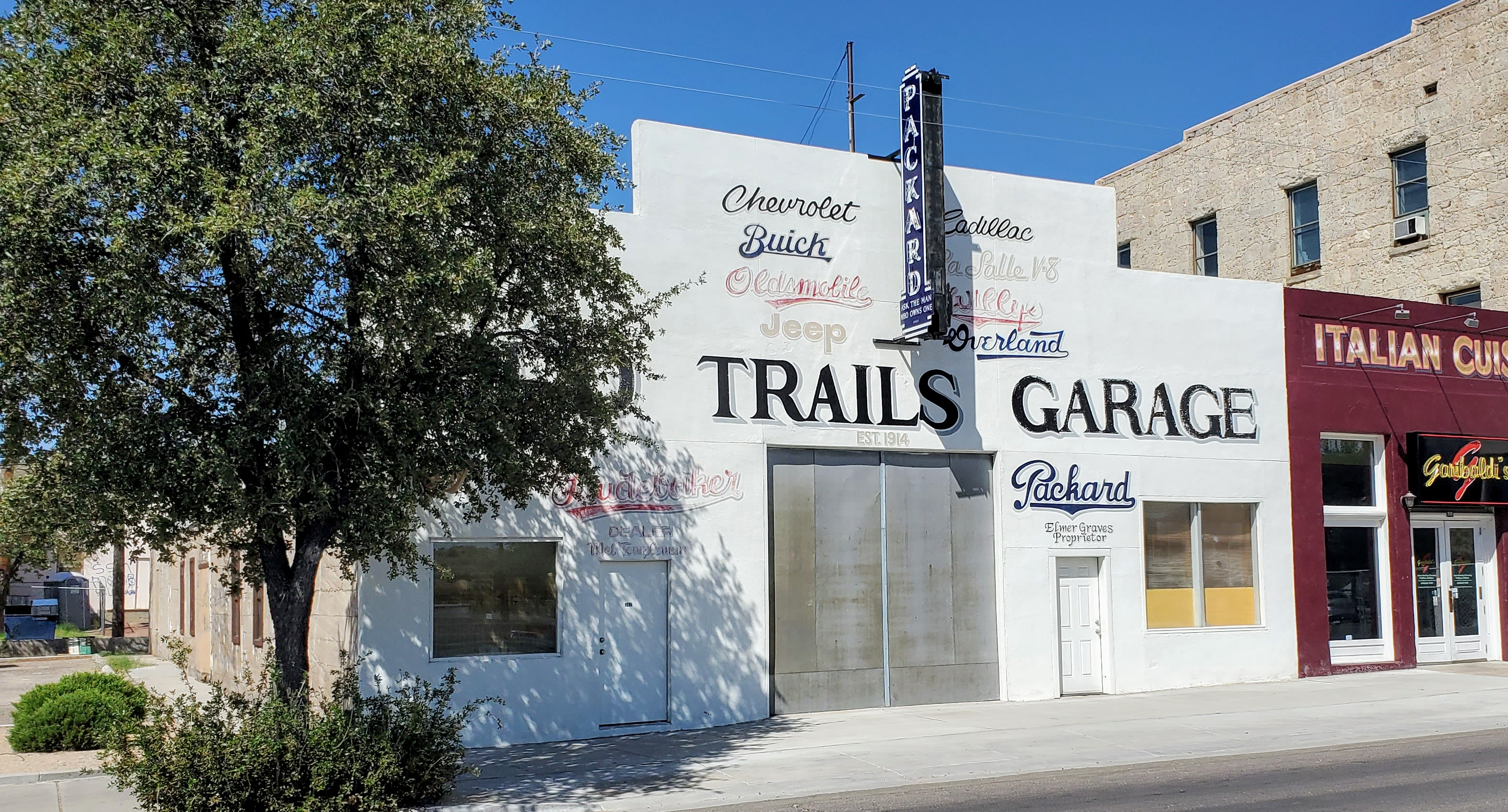
Old Trails Garage, 2022

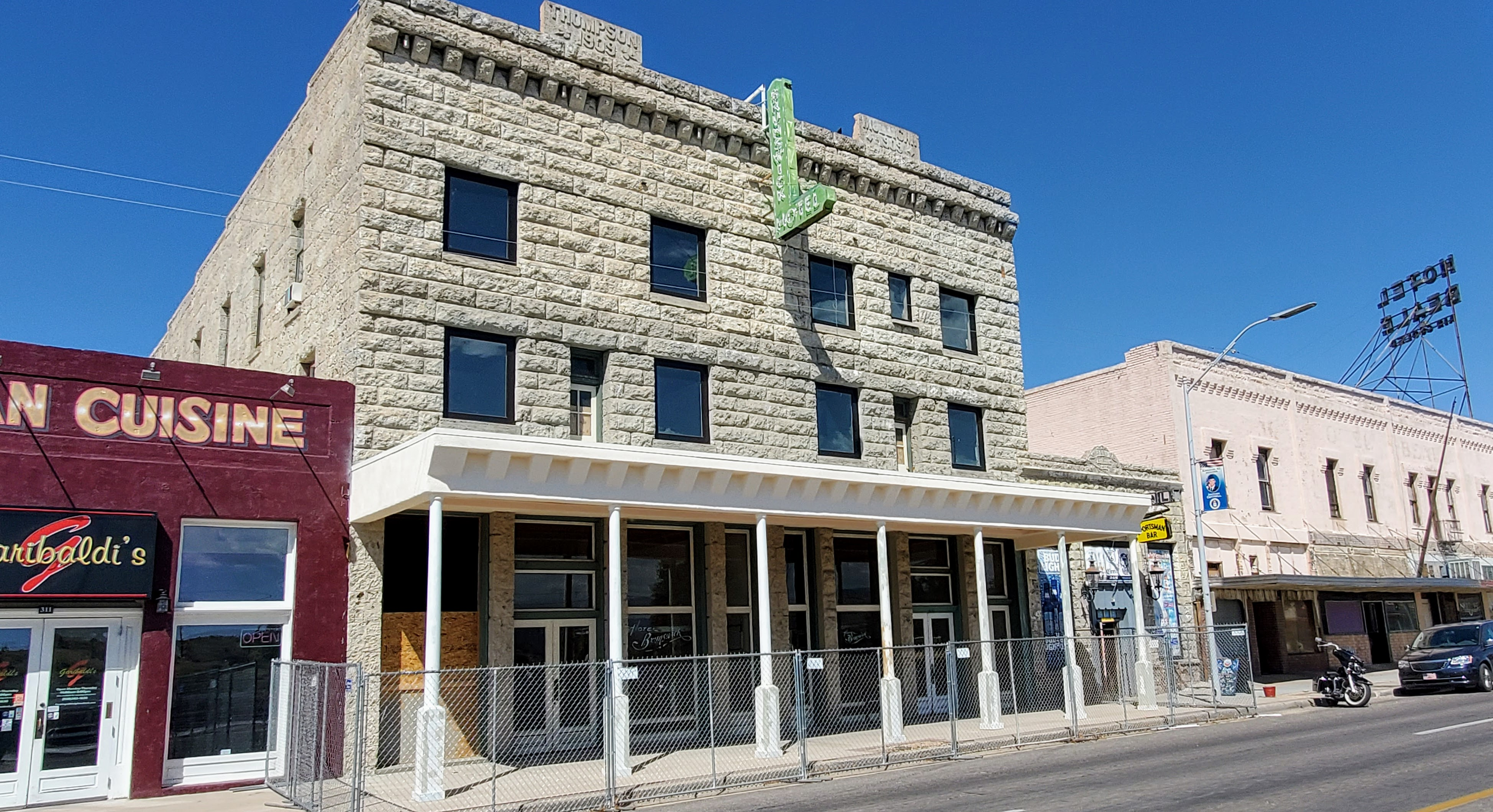
Brunswick Hotel, 2022

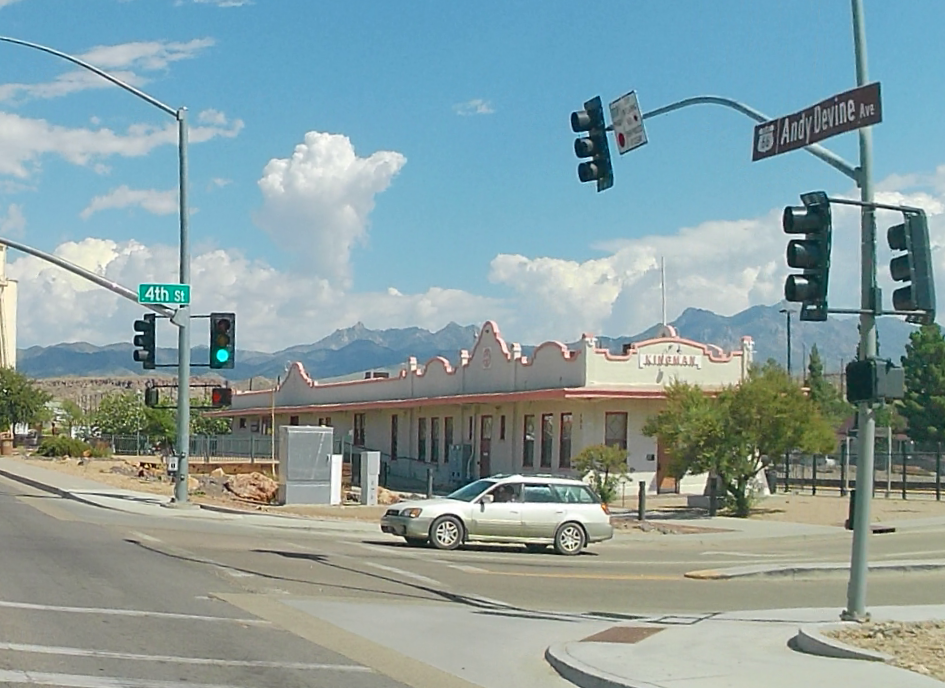
AT&SF Depot, 2022

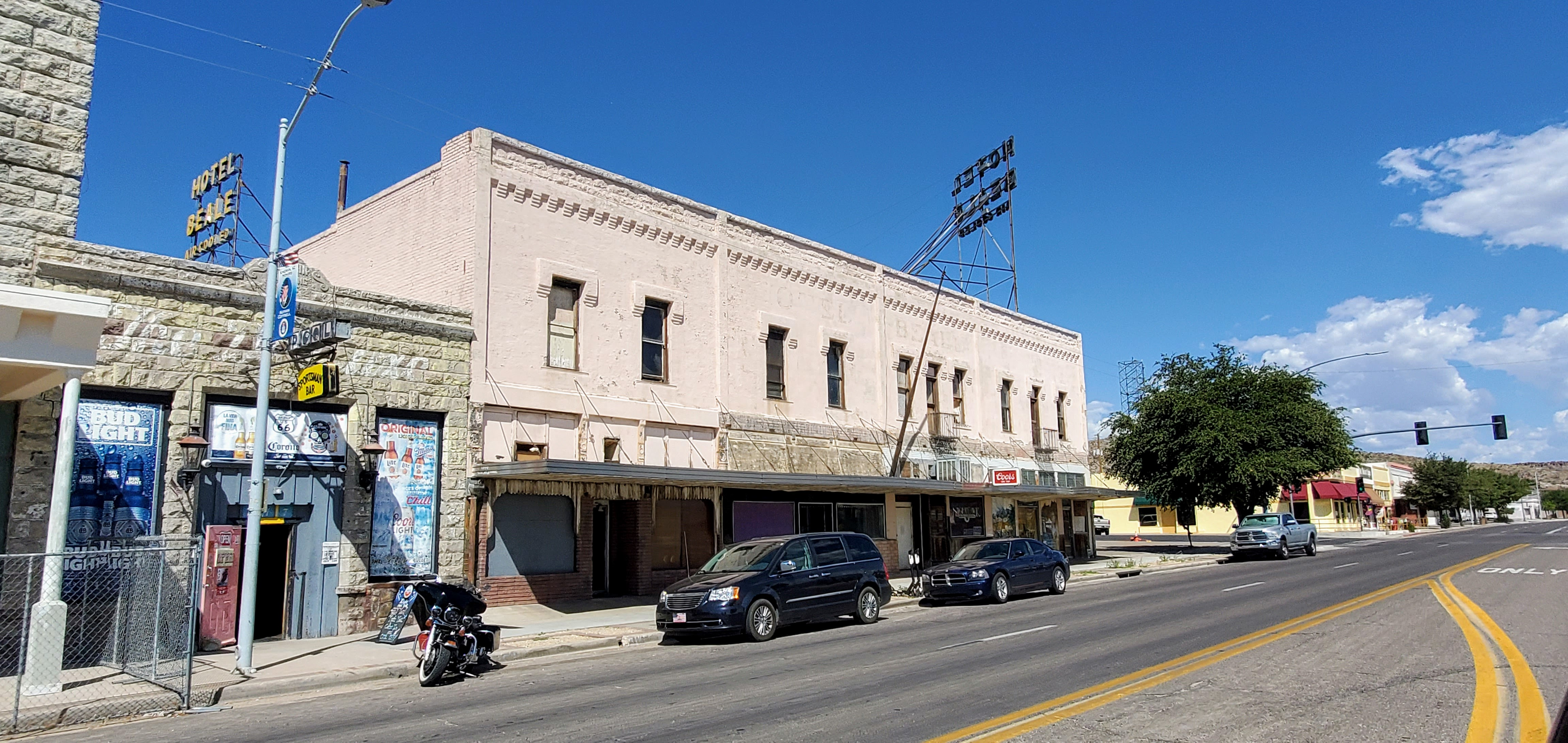
Beale Hotel, 2022
