= Richard S. Irwin Barn =

- U.S. National Register of Historic Places
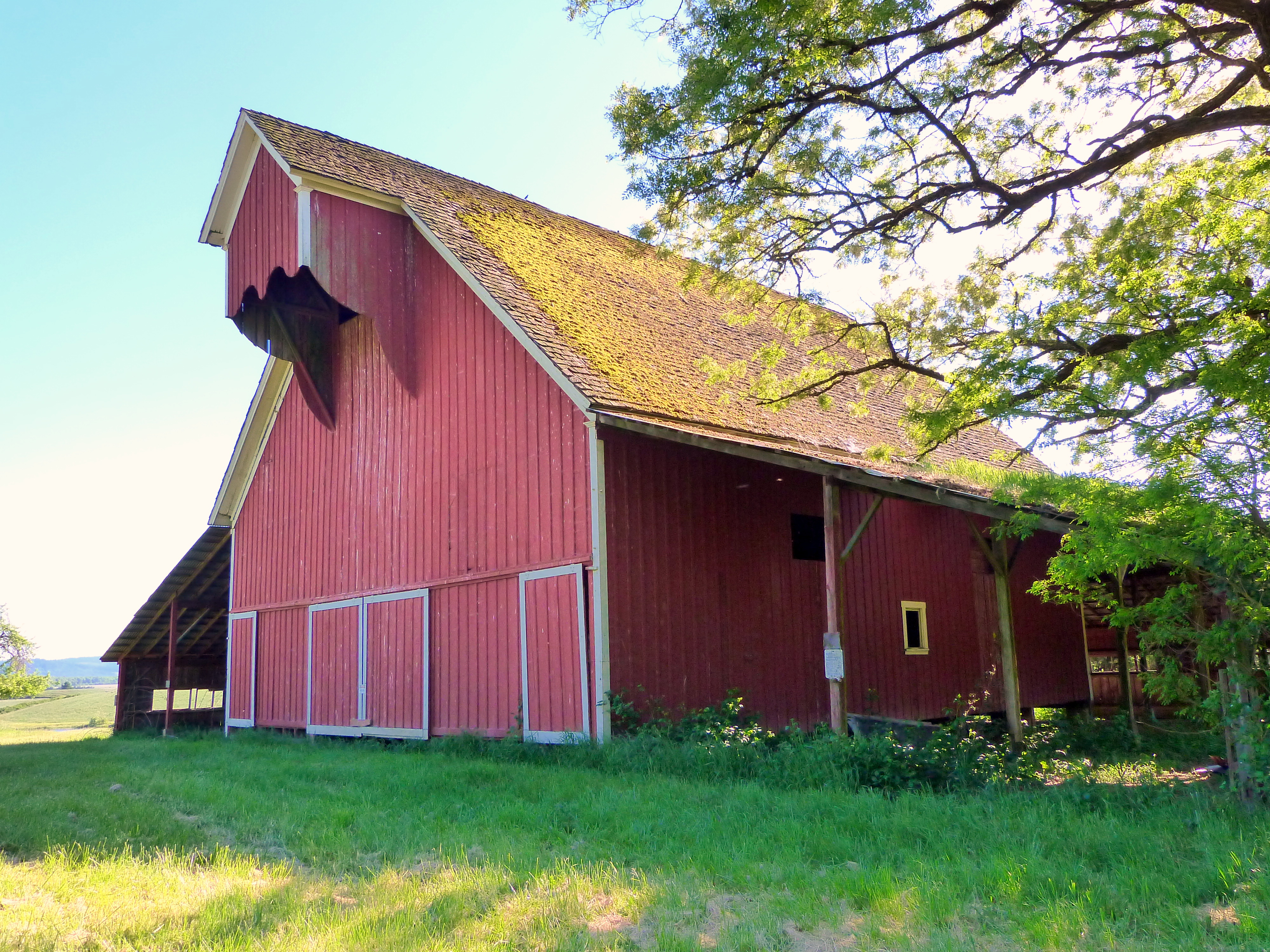

- Location within Oregon Location within the United States
- Location: Off Bruce Road, William L. Finley National Wildlife Refuge
- Nearest city: Corvallis, Oregon
- Coordinates: 44°23′57″N 123°18′15″W
- Area: 0.45 acres (0.18 ha)
- Built: 1900
- Built by: Ernest E. Brimner
- Architectural style: Western barn
- NRHP reference No.: 88000954
- Added to NRHP: July 7, 1988

The Richard S. Irwin Barn, also referred to as Cheadle Barn, is a historic agricultural building located in rural Benton County, Oregon, United States.

The barn was purchased by the United States Fish and Wildlife Service in 1965, and is part of the William L. Finley National Wildlife Refuge. It was listed on the National Register of Historic Places in 1988.

It has a prominent hay hood.

== See also ==
- National Register of Historic Places listings in Benton County, Oregon
