= Railroad Addition Historic District (Flagstaff, Arizona) =

Historic area

- U.S. National Register of Historic Places
- U.S. Historic district
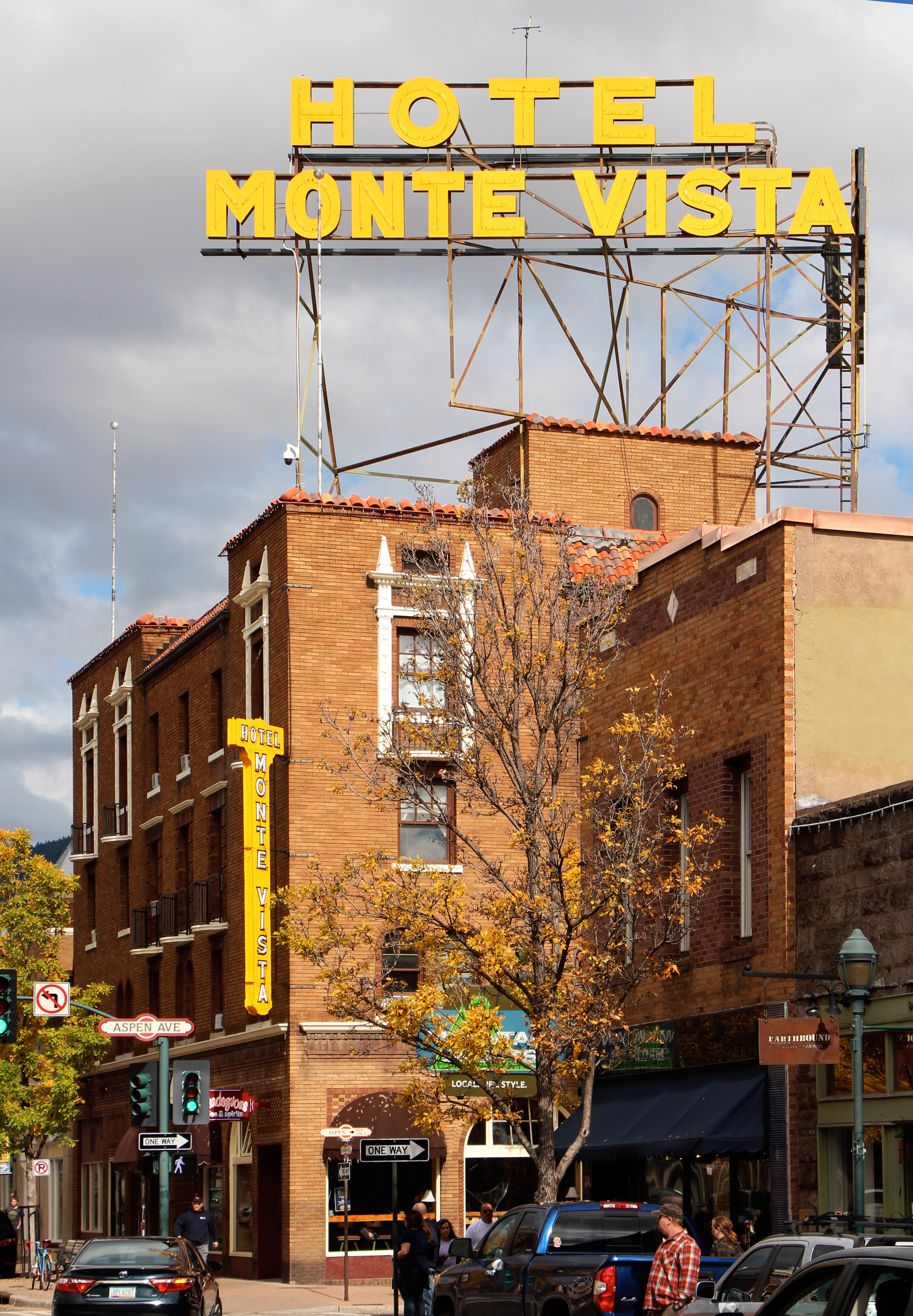
- Hotel Monte Vista

- Location within Arizona Location within the United States
- Location: Roughly bounded by Santa Fe RR tracks, Agassiz and Beaver Sts., Birch and Aspen Aves., Flagstaff, Arizona
- Area: 17.8 acres (7.2 ha)
- Built: 1883
- Architect: Underwood, Gilbert Stanley; Et al.
- Architectural style: Early Commercial, Romanesque, Classical Revival
- MPS: Flagstaff MRA (AD)
- NRHP reference No.: 83002989 (original); 86001360 (increase 1); 97001086 (increase 2)

Significant dates
- Added to NRHP: January 18, 1983
- Boundary increases: June 17, 1986; September 5, 1997

The Flagstaff Railroad Addition Historic District is significant because of its association with the Atchison, Topeka and Santa Fe Railway as well as U.S. Route 66. The original boundary was roughly bounded by Santa Fe RR tracks, Agassiz and Beaver Sts., Birch and Aspen Avenues. The district was expanded twice to add nine buildings along Phoenix Avenue from Beaver Street to San Francisco Avenue, and a building at 122 East Route 66.

Disastrous fires swept through early Flagstaff; in 1897, the city passed an ordinance requiring all buildings in the business area to be built of brick, stone or iron.

Several of the buildings in the District are associated with well-known businessmen of the late 1800s and early 1900s. These include John W. Weatherford, who constructed the Weatherford Hotel, the Babbitt brothers David, George, William and Charles, whose names are associated with several buildings in the District, and Thomas E. Pollock Sr.

Notable buildings in the Railroad Addition Historic District
Name	Year Built	Architectural Style	Comments
Flagstaff 1926 Depot Santa Fe Depot 1926 Building, 1 East Route 66	1926	Revival Tudor	Built during the boom years of the 1920s, and is now considered a symbol of Flagstaff. Today it is known as the Amtrak station and Visitor Center.
McMillan Building McMillan Building, Northwest corner of Route 66 and Leroux St.	1886		Hotel built out of native stone and locally made brick; bank located at corner
Raymond Building Ramond Building, 9 N Leroux St.	1911		Dr. Raymond was one of Flagstaff's earliest physicians; Moencopi sandstone around door
Loy Building Loy Building, 15 N Leroux St.	1897		Loy was an attorney
Citizen's Bank Building Citizen's Bank Building, 17 N Leroux St.	1903		Constructed of Moencopi sandstone
Flagstaff Telephone Exchange Flagstaff Telephone Exchange, 23 N Leroux St.	1909		Was the first major telephone office; built by John Weatherford; reverted to restaurant in 1930; constructed of Moencopi sandstone
Weatherford Hotel Weatherford Hotel, 23 N Leroux St.	First section made 1898 and second section made in 1899		Considered to be a downtown anchor since 1900; constructed of Moencopi sandstone
Coalter Building Coalter Building, 1 E Aspen Ave.	1898		Flagstaff's first Post Office
Pollock Building Pollock Building, series of shops at 5 E Aspen Ave.	1900–03		Flagstaff's first library on the second floor
Babbitt Building #1 Babbitt Building 1, 15 E Aspen Ave.	1907		Flagstaff's second Post Office located here; constructed of tufa
Babbitt Building #2 Babbitt Building#2, 10 E Aspen Ave.	1911		
Elks Hall Elks Hall, 24 N San Francisco St.	1899		The Elks occupied the top floor; the first bowling alley in Flagstaff was in the basement; ground floor was a drug store
Coconino Sun Building Coconino Sun Building, 111 E. Aspen Ave.	1926		The Sun Newspaper has been Flagstaff's newspaper since 1891; it was moved to this location to make room for the Monte Vista Hotel
Bikker Building #1 Bikker Building#1, 113 E. Aspen Ave.	1917		Originally a harness shop; unusual shell of pebble siding added later
Bikker Building #2 Bikker Building#2, 119 E. Aspen Ave.	1917		First floor to house JCPenney, the first chain to come to Flagstaff; second floor Odd Fellows hall
Monte Vista Hotel Monte Vista Hotel, 100 N San Francisco St.	1926		The construction on this hotel was a community effort, in 1926 raising $200,000 within 60 days
Riordan Building Riordan Building, 106 N. San Francisco St.	1917	Neoclassical	Flagstaff's 3rd Post Office
Babbitt Brothers Building Babbitt Brothers Building, 73 E Aspen Ave.	1888		Was originally a department store; it has been expanded many times, and restored to original appearance in 1990
Babbitt's Garage Babbitt's Garage, 175 N San Francisco St.	1915		The Babbitt brothers constructed this for automobiles, using reinforced concrete: a first for the area
Masonic Temple Masonic Temple, 105 E Birch Ave.	1917		Upper story housed the temple; ground floors and basement were rentals
Federal Building Federal Building, 114 N San Francisco St.	1936	Federal Modern style	Flagstaff's fifth Post Office
Hawks Building Hawks Building, 14 N San Francisco St.	1897		
Nackard Building Nackard Building, 15 N San Francisco St.	1922		Location of fourth Post office
Brannen Building #3 Brannen Building#3, 106 Route 66	1887		Housed town's first physician, D. J. Brannen, who had office and drug store here
Brannen Building #5 Brannen Building#5, 102 Route 66	1883		P.J. Brannen was first store owner to set up business in Flagstaff; the building burned once but was rebuilt using original stones
Vail Building Vail Building, 3 N San Francisco St.	1888	Art Deco	Most of Flagstaff's first businesses were saloons, catering to railroad workers; brawls and shootings were common; building made of brick, but stuccoed in 1939
Donahue Building Donahue Building, 22 Route 66	1888		Originally a saloon, and was owned by one of Flagstaff's most colorful characters, Sandy Donahue; built of brick and stuccoed in the 1930s
Santa Fe Depot 1889 Santa Fe Depot 1889, Route 66	1889		Flagstaff's first train depot; in 1886, wooden depot destroyed by fire; present building made of Moencopi sandstone
