= Flagstaff station =

Historic railroad station in Coconino County, Arizona

Flagstaff, AZ
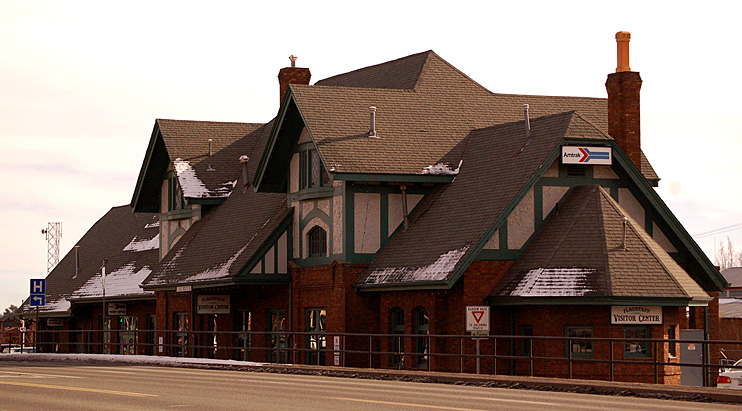
- Flagstaff station in 2006

General information
- Location: 1 East Route 66; Flagstaff, Arizona
- Coordinates: 35.197259°N 111.649365°W
- Owner: City of Flagstaff
- Line: BNSF Seligman Subdivision
- Platforms: 1 side platform
- Tracks: 2
- Connections: Mountain Line; Greyhound Lines

Other information
- Station code: Amtrak: FLG

History
- Opened: 1886
- Rebuilt: January 6, 1926

Passengers
- FY 2025: 31,694 (Amtrak)

Services
| Preceding station | Amtrak | Following station |
|---|---|---|
| Kingman toward Los Angeles | Southwest Chief | Winslow toward Chicago |
Former services
| Preceding station | Atchison, Topeka and Santa Fe Railway | Following station |
|---|---|---|
| Riordan toward Los Angeles | Main Line | Cliffs toward Chicago |
- Flagstaff Santa Fe station
- U.S. Historic district – Contributing property
- Architectural style: Tudor Revival
- Part of: Railroad Addition Historic District (ID83002989)
- Designated CP: January 18, 1983
Location

Flagstaff station is an Amtrak train station in Flagstaff, Arizona. It is served by the daily Southwest Chief. The station, formerly an Atchison, Topeka and Santa Fe Railway depot, also contains a visitor center.

== History ==
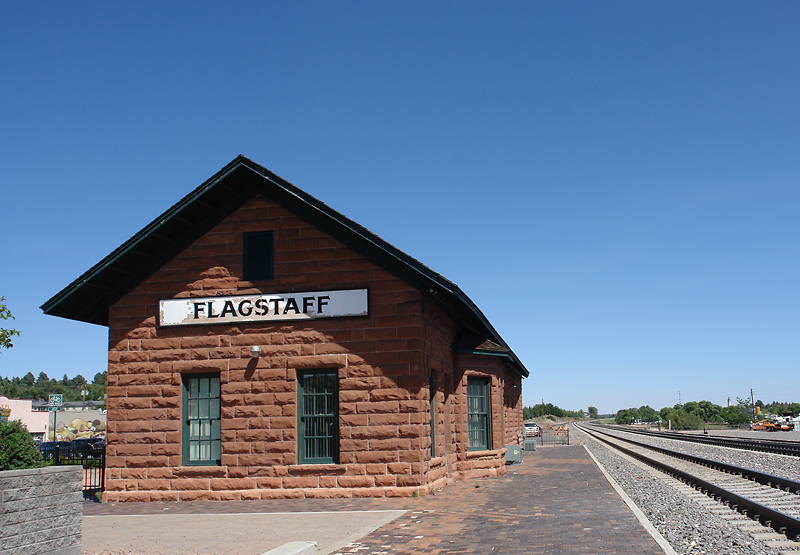
The 1889 A&P depot

The first rail station in Flagstaff was built in 1886 by the Atlantic and Pacific Railroad (A&P). That depot, constructed of wood, burned down and was replaced in 1889 by a stone structure which still stands to the present day. In the 1890s, the A&P was acquired by the Atchison, Topeka and Santa Fe Railroad (AT&SF).

The AT&SF built the present depot in 1925, with a public grand opening celebration held on January 5, 1926. The first trains to use the depot were on January 6, 1926. The station's elevation is 6,902 feet (2,104 m) above sea level, making it one of the highest train stations in the Amtrak system. Adjacent, across San Francisco Street at 101 East Route 66, is the 1889 solid-red sandstone A&P depot, which the 1926 depot replaced. The 1889 structure was then converted for use as a freight depot, though it no longer serves in that capacity.

On May 1, 1971, Amtrak took over operation of the AT&SF's passenger trains and continues to operate the Flagstaff Station from the historic 1926 depot, which it now shares with the Flagstaff Visitor Center. The building and two adjacent parking lots are owned by the City of Flagstaff, while the tracks are owned and operated by the AT&SF's successor, the BNSF Railway.

Both the former Santa Fe Depot and the Atlantic and Pacific Depot that it replaced are contributing properties to the Railroad Addition Historic District.

In October 2024, the city was awarded a $5 million federal grant to build a second platform serving a new third main track, south of the existing two main tracks, replacing a no longer used freight track which once served clients south and west of the depot. The project will also modify the existing platform for better accessibility under the Americans with Disabilities Act.
