= Orpheum Theater (Flagstaff, Arizona) =

Performance venue

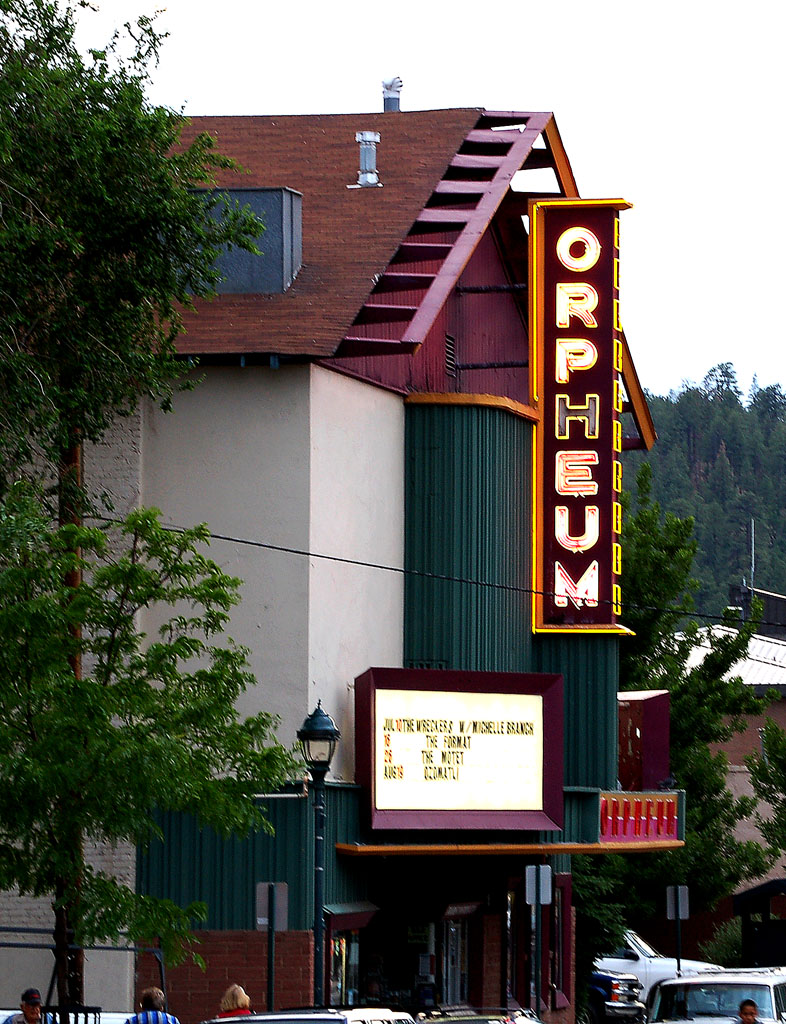
- The Orpheum Theater in downtown Flagstaff features a wide variety of concerts and other performances.
- Interactive map of Orpheum Theater
- Address: 15 West Aspen Avenue; Flagstaff, Arizona; United States
- Coordinates: 35°11′55″N 111°38′58″W
- Owner: Chris Scully, Charles Smith
- Capacity: 1000
- Screen: 1
- Current use: Music venue

Construction
- Opened: 1911
- Closed: 1999
- Reopened: 2002
- Rebuilt: 1917

Website
- www.orpheumflagstaff.com

The Orpheum Theater is an old movie house in Flagstaff, Arizona, originally named the Majestic Opera House. The building was constructed in 1911. It was rebuilt and expanded in 1917, and renamed the Orpheum. The theater closed in 1999. Three years later, in 2002, it reopened as a concert venue. It is owned by Chris Scully and Charles Smith.
