= Louis Werner Barn =

- Lewis Werner Barn
- U.S. National Register of Historic Places
- Location within Kansas Location within the United States
- Location: 4550 NE 80th Ave., near Murdock, Kansas
- Coordinates: 37.71337°N 97.97192°W
- Area: less than one acre
- Built: c. 1912
- MPS: Historic Agricultural-Related Resources of Kansas
- NRHP reference No.: 100005952
- Added to NRHP: December 22, 2020

The Lewis Werner Barn, in Kingman County, Kansas near Murdock, Kansas but with mailing address in Pretty Prairie, Kansas in Reno County, Kansas, was listed on the National Register of Historic Places in 2020.

It was built c. 1912. (Note: The Kansas Historic Resources Inventory lists an estimated date of 1912, while the NRHP nomination form says 1914.)

It is a wood-framed, rectangular gambrel roofed building.

It was deemed significant for its architecture: "The barn is an excellent example with a gambrel roof, designed, planned and built by its original owner. The barn was built on a concrete floor with cottonwood and fir lumber, roofed originally with wood shingles, and sided with five-inch wood lap siding. The gambrel-roof structure meets the registration requirements for the Historic Agriculture-Related Resources of Kansas, historic context. Located on 5-acres within a much larger agricultural property, the Louis Werner barn is over 100 years old and still maintains its historic function and association."

It is located at 4550 NE 80th Ave. on a five-acre (2.0 ha) homestead plot amidst much larger fields.

== See also ==
- Charles M. Prather Barn, also NRHP-listed and in Kingman County
