= Kingman station (Kansas) =

Historical train depot in Kansas

- Kingman Santa Fe Depot
- U.S. National Register of Historic Places
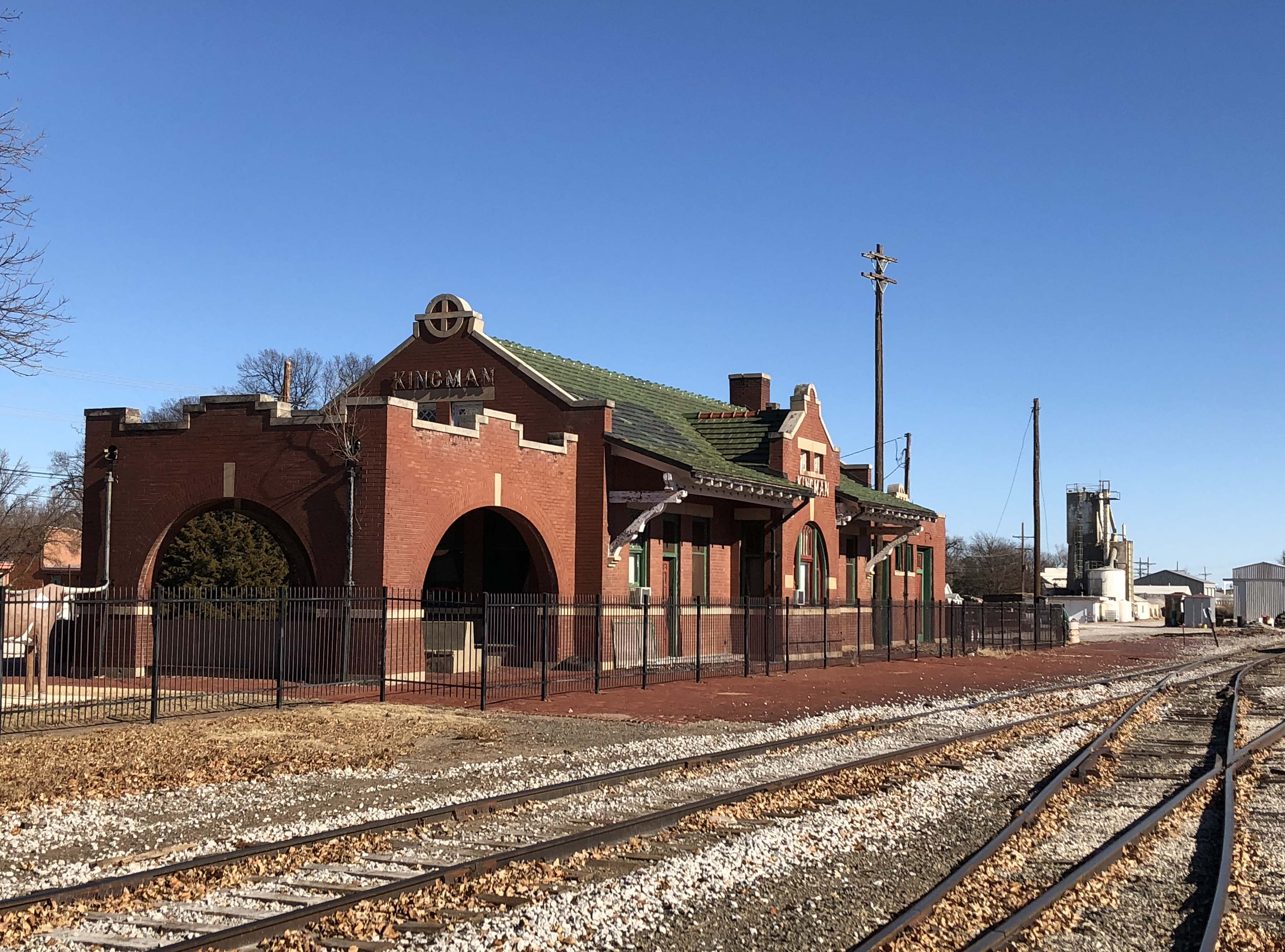
- Brick structure in 2017

- Location within Kansas
- Location: 201 East Sherman, Kingman, Kansas
- Coordinates: 37.64163°N 98.11179°W
- Area: less than one acre
- Built: 1910
- Architect: Atchison, Topeka, & Santa Fe RR Co.
- Architectural style: Mission Revival
- MPS: Railroad Resources of Kansas MPS
- NRHP reference No.: 01001091
- Added to NRHP: October 11, 2001

The Kingman Santa Fe Depot, or Kingman AT&SF Depot, is a former railway station in Kingman, Kansas. It is located at 201 East Sherman Street, which parallels the railroad tracks. The station building was opened in 1910 as a passenger depot for the Atchison, Topeka, & Santa Fe Railway.

The building was placed on the National Register of Historic Places in 2001.

== Description ==
The Mission Revival-style depot building is one story, and of brick construction with an overhanging gabled ceramic tile roof. The structure also has elements of the Prairie and Craftsman style of architecture. It features a covered outdoor waiting room, and two indoor waiting rooms, one for women and the other for men. The main hallway has 14 foot high ceilings that are barrel-arched and supported by interior pilasters.

Kansas Memory noted that "the one-story 'county seat' style depot built between 1910-11 features a gabled roof with a operators' bay and an enclosed freight room and a waiting room. At the top of the freight room are the Santa Fe emblems which are commonly associated with a county seat depot." The building is noted as being relatively long, at 120 feet (37 m) in length.

It served as a museum.
