= Weatherford Hotel =

United States historic place in Flagstaff, Arizona

- U.S. National Register of Historic Places
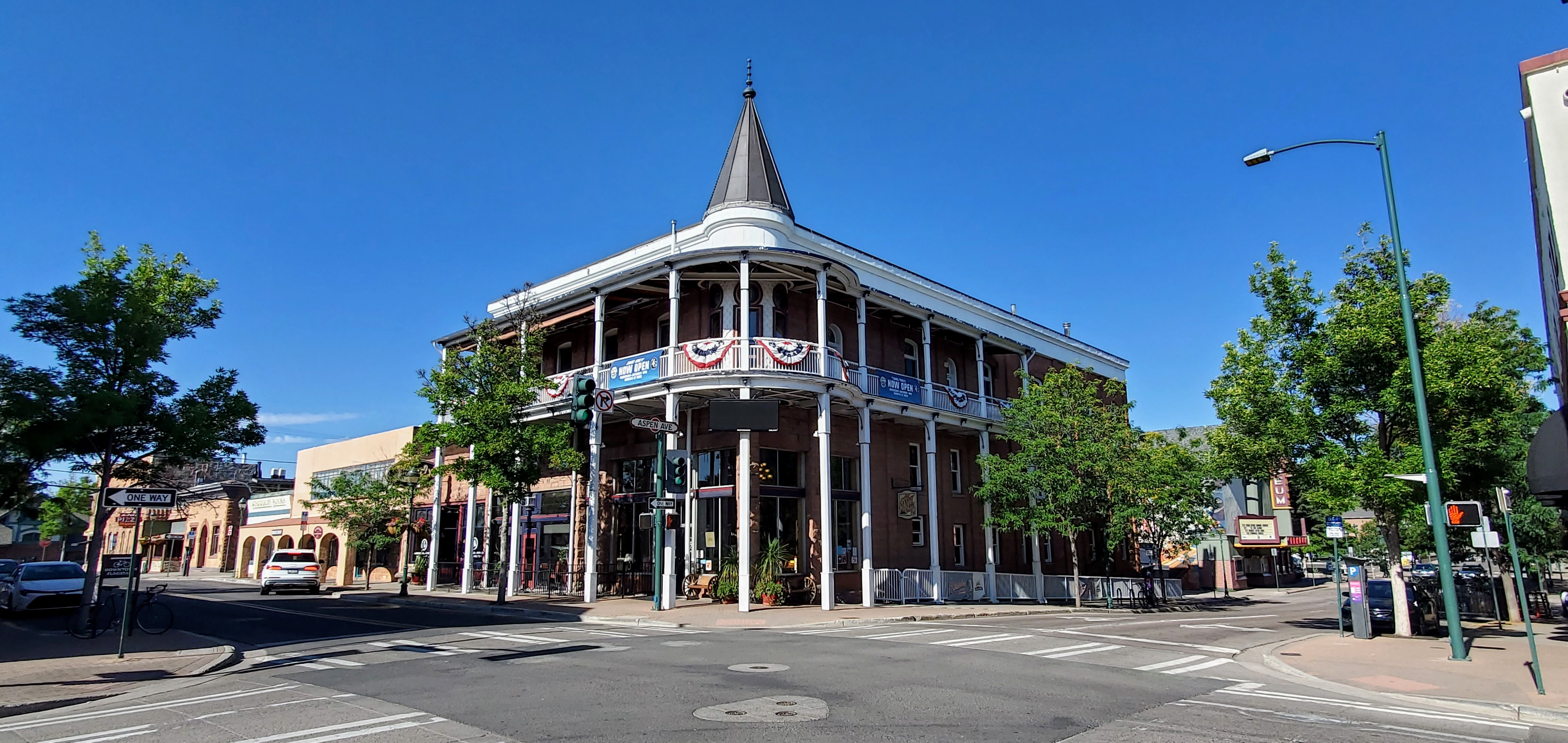
- Weatherford Hotel

- Location within Arizona Location within the United States
- Location: 23 N. Leroux St., Flagstaff, Arizona
- Coordinates: 35°11′54″N 111°38′53″W
- Area: 0.5 acres (0.20 ha)
- Built: 1898
- Built by: Herman Deitzman, G.B. Wilson, G.N. Baty
- NRHP reference No.: 78000543
- Added to NRHP: March 30, 1978

The Weatherford Hotel is a historic hotel in the downtown district of Flagstaff, Arizona. The hotel was established in 1897 by John W. Weatherford, and is located at 23 North Leroux Street, one block north of U.S. Route 66.

== History ==
Disastrous fires plagued early Flagstaff, like most frontier towns. After a particularly bad series of blazes in 1897, the city passed an ordinance requiring all buildings in the business area to be built of brick, stone or iron. Among the new buildings appearing in the year 1898 was the Weatherford Hotel, built by John W. Weatherford (1859–1934), a native of Weatherford, Texas. Stone work was by contractor Herman Deitzman; G.B. Wilson was carpenter; G.N. Baty was painter. The original structure housed a general store on the first floor, and the Weatherford family upstairs.

In March 1899, Weatherford began construction of a brick three-story hotel addition, with a grand opening on New Year's Day, 1900. For years, the Weatherford Hotel was the most prominent hotel in Flagstaff, entertaining guests such as artist Thomas Moran, publisher William Randolf Hearst, and writer Zane Grey. Grey's famous novel "The Call of the Canyon" was written in the recently renovated Zane Grey Ballroom on the third floor of the hotel.

A sunroom occupied part of the top floor and was used for dances and parties, while numerous civic groups engaged the downstairs. A three-sided balcony, visible in the 1905 photograph hanging in the Ballroom was damaged by fire and removed in 1929, along with the original cupola. At various times, the hotel housed a restaurant, theater, and billiard hall and radio station.

Henry Taylor purchased the hotel in 1975 in an attempt to keep it from being demolished, at a time when the downtown area was in an acute state of disrepair and decline. Since then, Henry and his wife Pamela (Sam) have renovated the structure, with the goal of restoring the hotel to its original grandeur. The third floor Ballroom was renovated and reopened in 1997 and the first stage of reconstructing the wrap-around porches were finished in February 1999.

When transcontinental telephone service first reached Flagstaff about 1910, a small brick building with a three-bay facade of red Coconino sandstone was erected south of the hotel to serve the telephone company, becoming part of the "Weatherford Block". The building served its original purpose until at least the 1930s, when it underwent the first of two modernizations.

The sandstone facade was stuccoed over in a modified art-deco style, and in the 1950s aluminum siding was added. It was known for some years as the "Le Brea Cafe", an establishment whose character does not appear to have elicited any significant historic recollection.

The cafe facade renovation completed in 1995 restored the appearance of the original 1909 Telephone Exchange. The elegant simplicity and casual ambiance of the "Exchange Pub" is reminiscent of Flagstaff as it was around the start of its 20th century heyday.

The renovation continues today with future expansions to include the development of the basement which was the original Hotel Pub & Restaurant in 1900.

The hotel was added to the National Register of Historic Places in 1978.
