= Hay hood =

Architectural element of barns

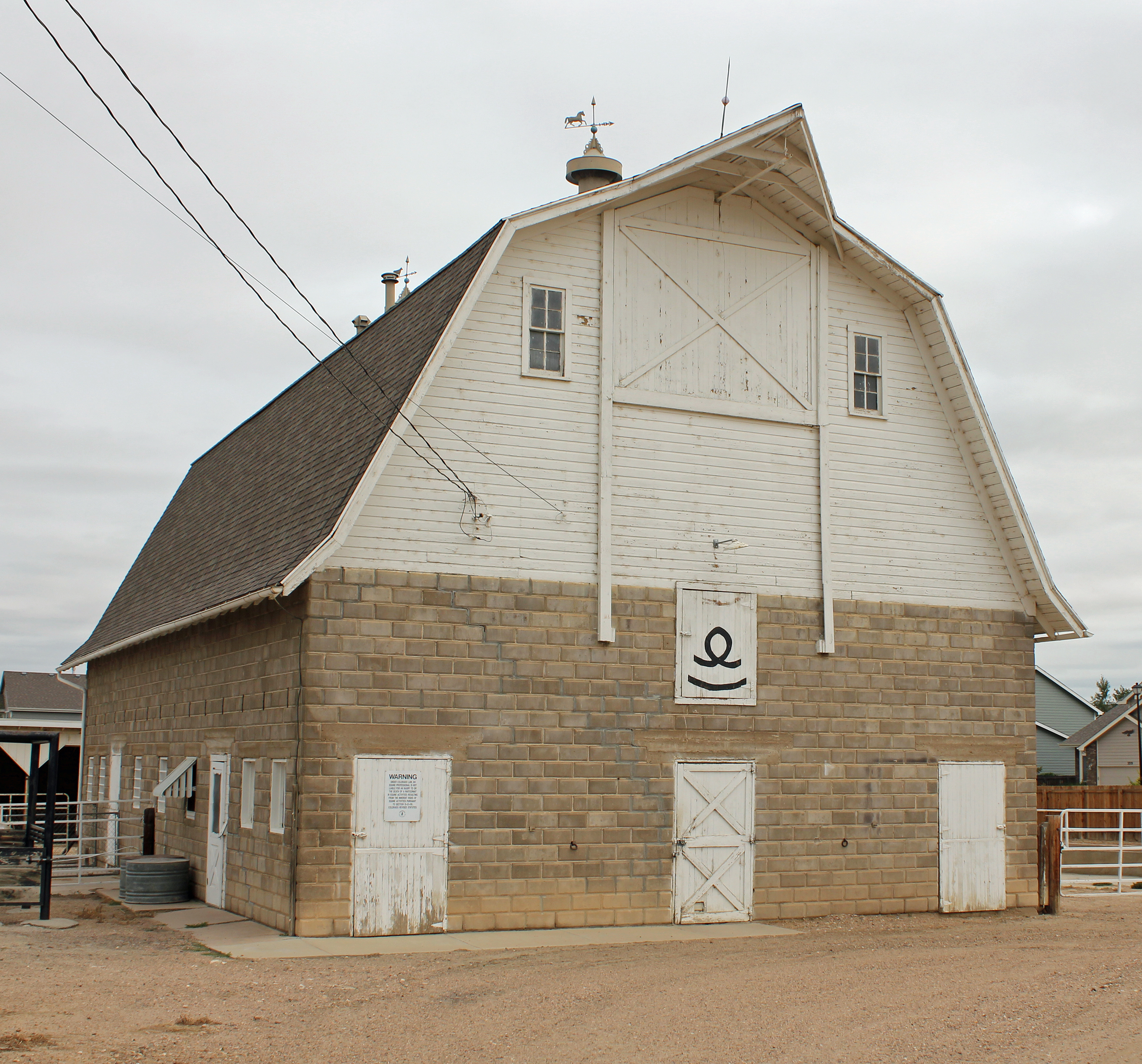
A pointed hay hood on the gambrel roofed Anderson Barn in Johnstown, Colorado

A hay hood is a roof extension which projects from the ridge of a barn roof, usually at the top of a gable. It provides shelter over a window or door used for passing hay into the attic or loft of the barn; it may hold a pulley for hoisting hay or hay bales up to the loft, or a fork or grapple and track system (or hay carrier) where hay can be lifted and then moved throughout the barn. A barn may have the ridge beam extended past the wall with a lifting mechanism but no hay hood.

This simplest hay hood includes a tapered roof extension providing some protection from the weather. A non-tapered extension provides more protection. A hay hood with partial or full walls underneath the extension on two sides is more protective, while an extension with three sides, allowing hay to be brought into the barn only through its "floor" keeps virtually all rain or snow out of the barn.

A hay hood can be built on a barn with any roof type. The type of hood is generally determined by the weather of a particular region. A barn in a semi-arid region may have no hood or just a simple pointed one. A barn in a region with frequent driving rain may have a completely enclosed hay hood. This is common in an area of western Oregon in the United States, centered on the town of Monroe in the Willamette Valley, where it is called a hay cupola. Most gambrel roofed barns in the western U.S. have pointed hay hoods. Hay hoods have been built on round barns. (Note: A hay hood on a round barn does not meet the standard definition since the roof of a round barn has no ridge, therefore the no ridge extension. On a round barn, a hay hood is more of a dormer but serves the same function of protecting a loft opening.)

It may also be known as a hay bonnet, hay gable, widow's peak, (Note: This term is used by contemporary manufacturers of vintage-looking barns for a purely decorative element, apparently borrowing the name from widow's peak and/or widow's cap.) crow's beak, or hanging gable.

To prevent small gaps around the closed doors at the beam penetration that would allow birds to enter the barn, one farmer in Reasnor, Iowa, designed a hay hood with a "bunker door" that when closed, was an angled floor on the hay hood, completely enclosing the hood and keeping birds such as sparrows and pigeons out of the barn.

== Other uses ==
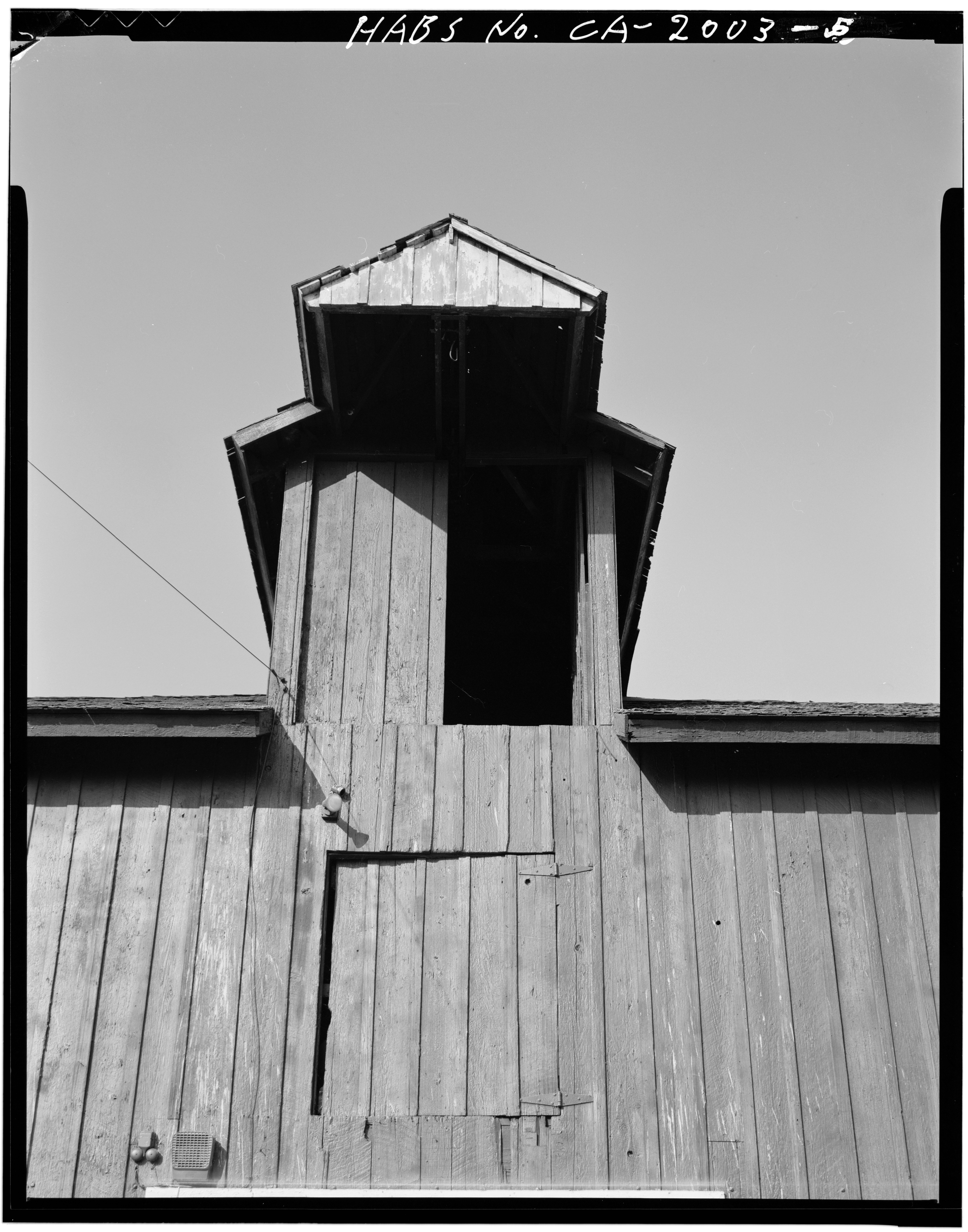
A catshead to a barn

A little catshead (alternatively cat's head or cats head) is an architectural feature commonly found on multi-storied mills, agricultural buildings, and factories, composed of a small extension protruding from the gable end of a larger roof.

A grist mill with a single main roof and catsheads at each end vaguely resembles a cat's head in sillohuette, with the catsheads forming the "ears" of the imaginary feline; this may be the origin of the name.

Catsheads originally existed to protect the ropes and pulleys associated with lifting equipment (such as the block and tackle rigs used to shift multi-ton milling equipment and the simple wheel pulleys used to lift fodder into haylofts) from ice and the corrosion caused by rain. In driest climates, if they had an opening to the building which lacked a door or window, this may have been adequate to prevent the goods from deteriorating.

Adding the protective catshead to the gable end of a roofline makes roofing tasks such as taking and removing tiles/panels simpler, and was an economy as obviates the flashing (weatherproofing) of a completely separate roof.

Whimsical architectural styles (such as New World Queen Anne Revival architecture) may also sport catsheads as non-functional decorative features.

== Gallery ==
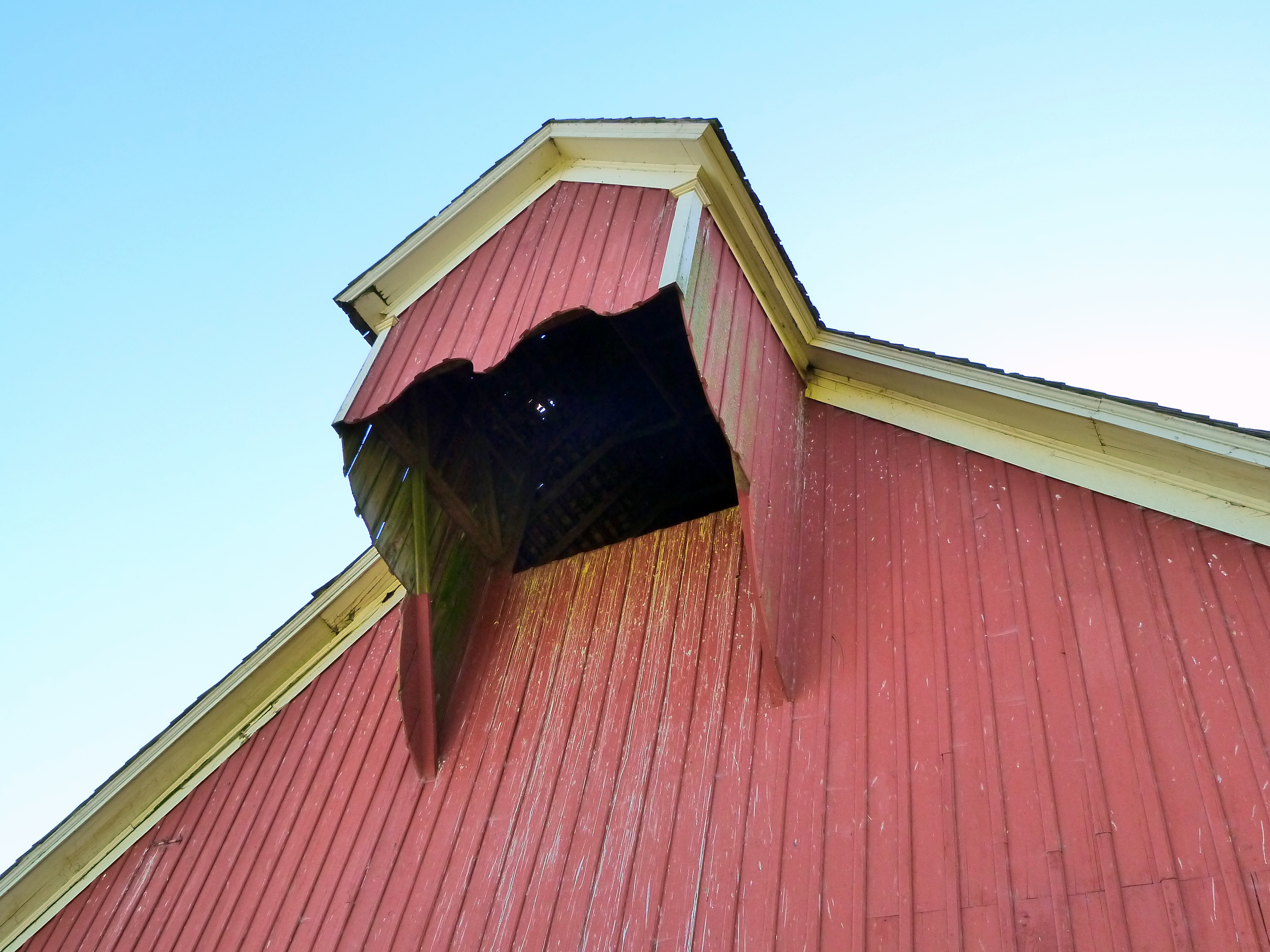
Fully enclosed hay hood on the Cheadle Barn in Benton County, Oregon, U.S., listed on the National Register of Historic Places

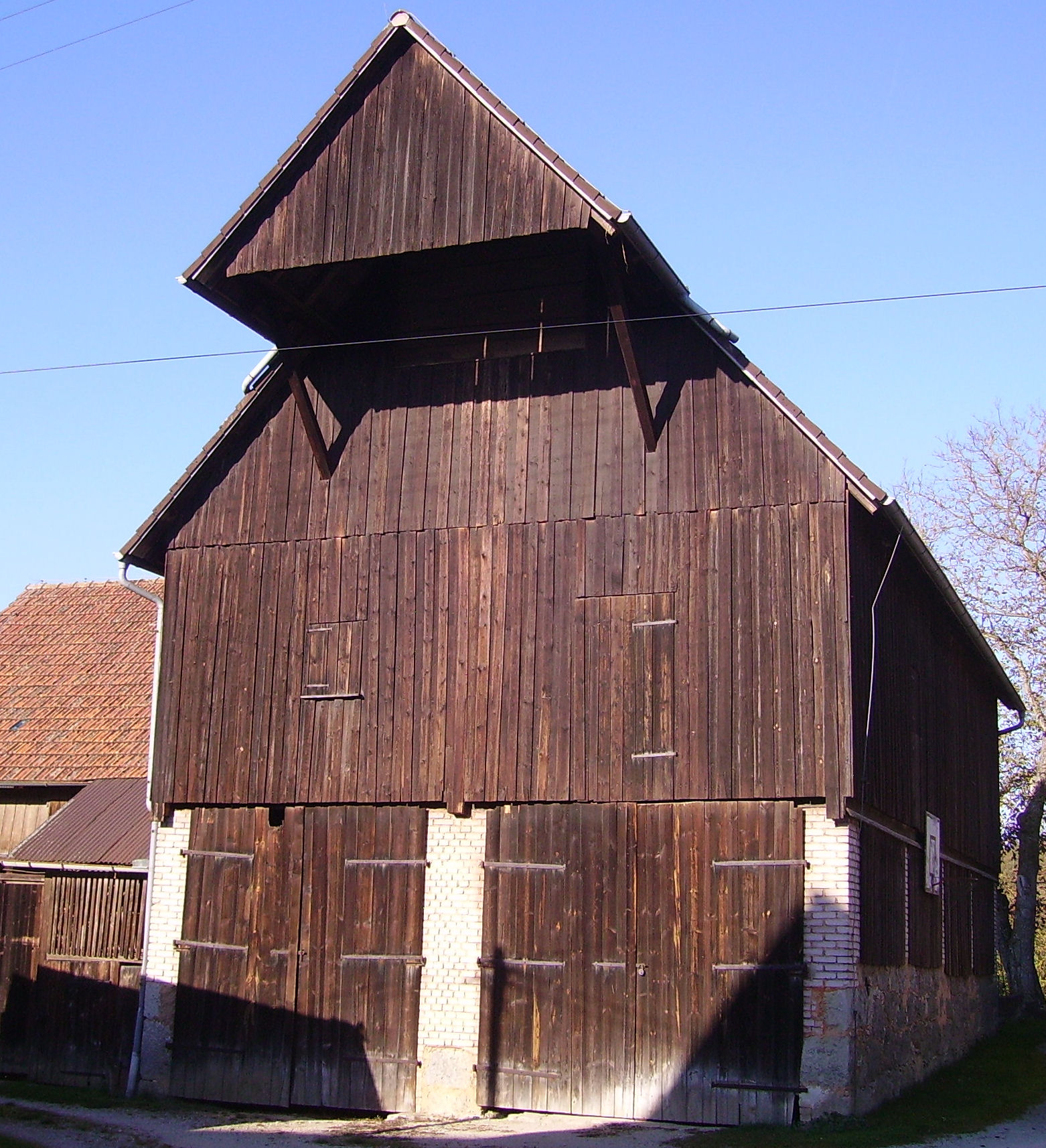
Fully enclosed hay hood on a barn in Heiligenstadt in Oberfranken in Upper Franconia, Bavaria, Germany

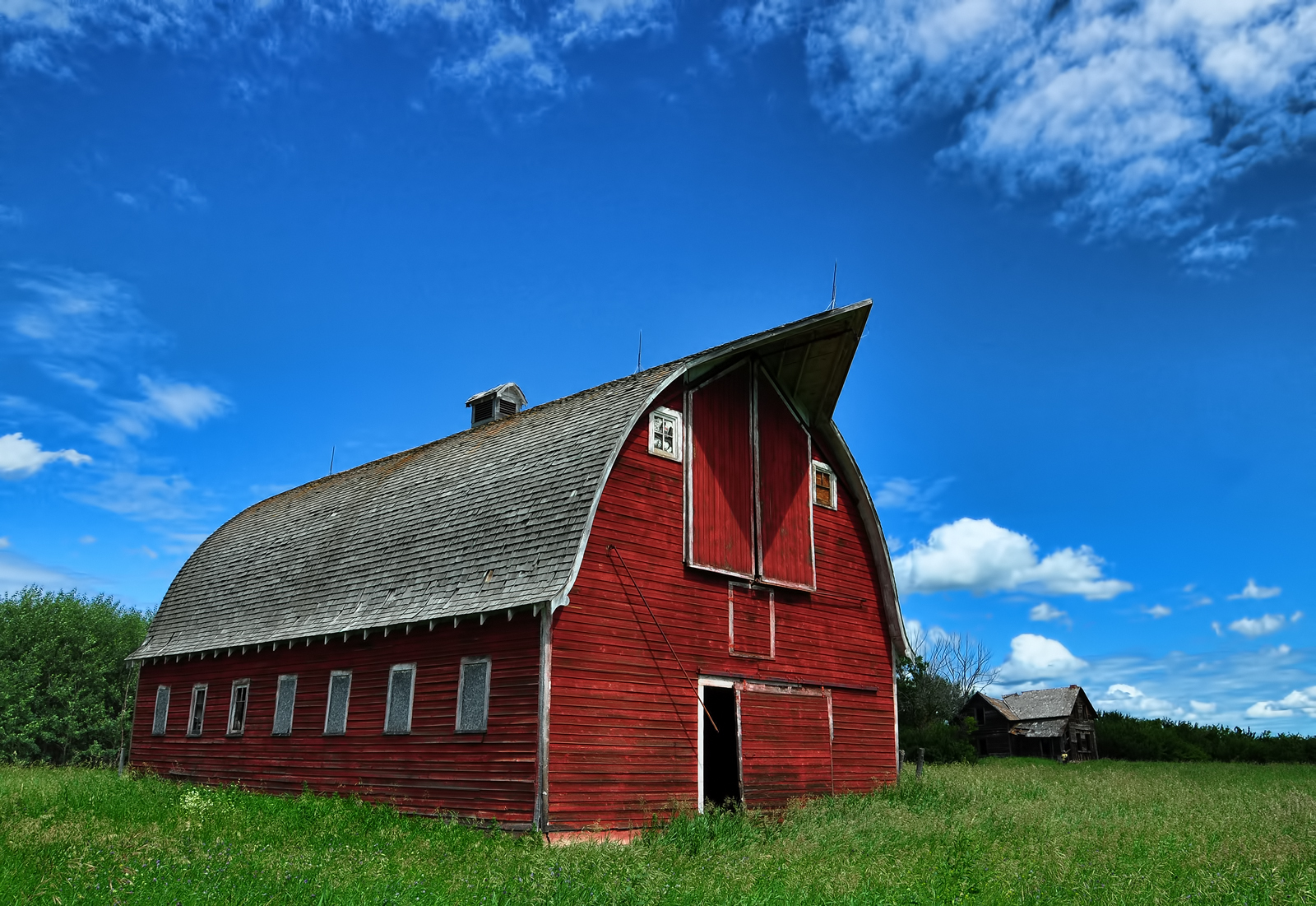
Pointed hay hood on a round-roofed barn in Alberta, Canada

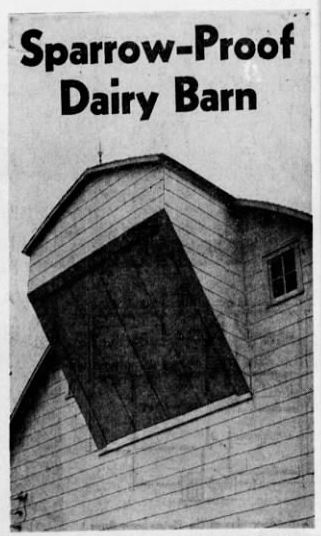
Bottom-doored hay hood in Reasnor, Iowa, U.S.

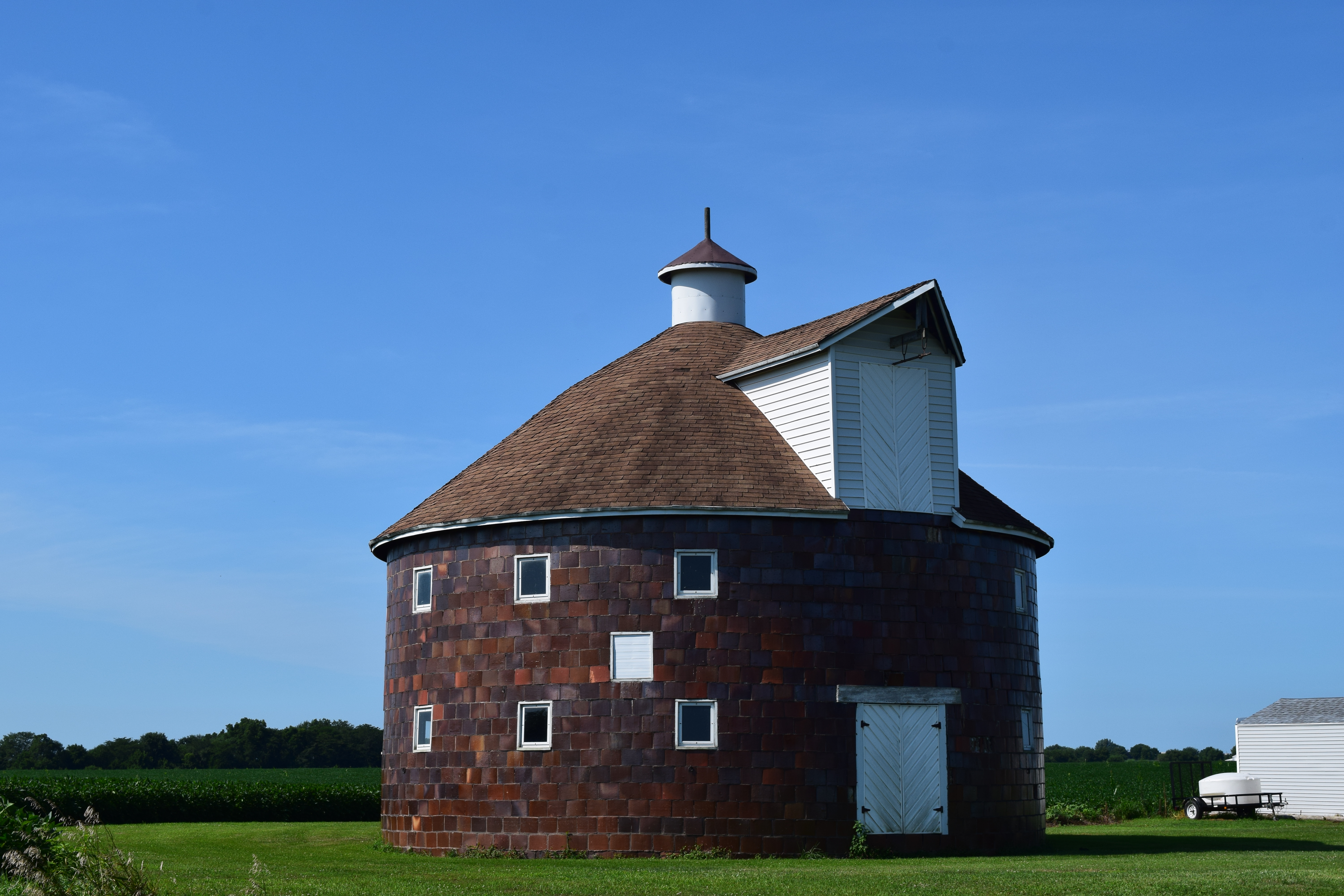
Hay hood on a round barn (Virginia Tillery Round Barn in Greene County, Illinois)

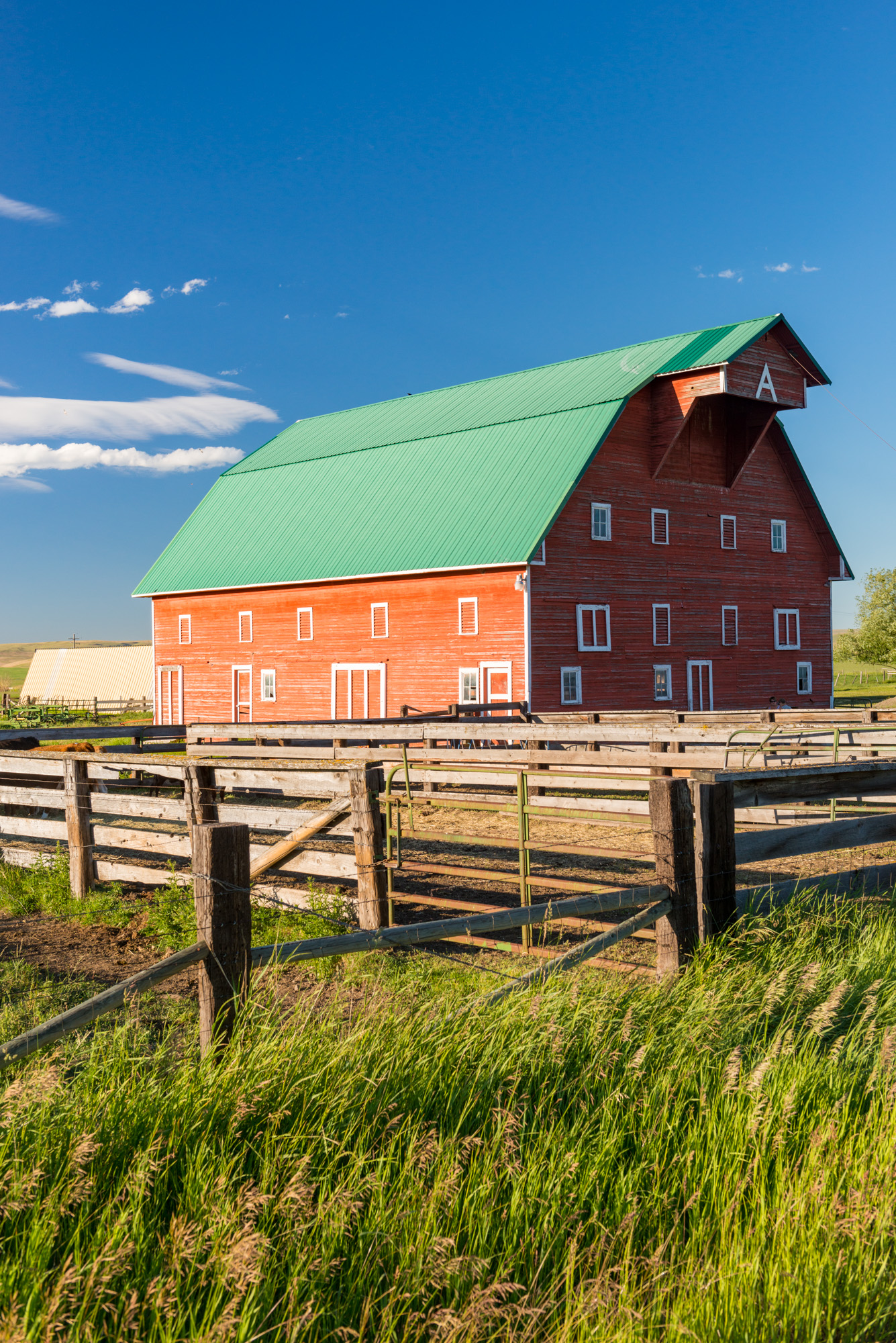
Barn with hay hood in Wallowa County, Oregon
