= History of Flagstaff, Arizona =

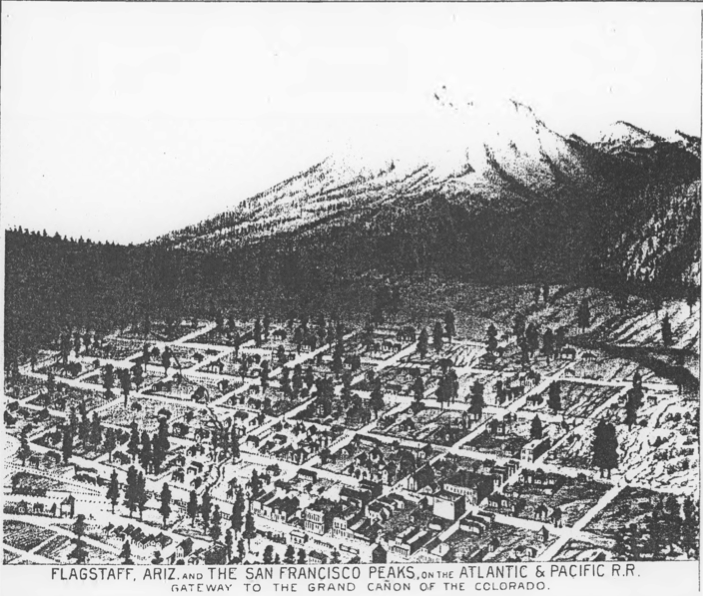
An illustration of Flagstaff in 1892

Flagstaff is a city in, and the county seat of, Coconino County in northern Arizona, in the southwestern United States. Established as a modern settlement in 1876 and incorporated as a city in 1928, the land had previously been lived on by native peoples of the southwest, primarily the Sinagua. Mountaineer Antoine Leroux then traveled the area, with Edward Fitzgerald Beale following in his footsteps and establishing a trail through the city in the mid-1800s. With a local spring, a small settlement grew by the wagon road, and the town was dominated by the McMillan, Riordan, and Babbitt families. Focused on agricultural pursuits, these families constructed some historic red stone buildings that still stand today.

Beale's trail was replaced with cross-country railroads and highways, including Route 66. This expanded tourism – a main draw of the city is its location surrounded by sites of natural wonder, including the Grand Canyon – and was cause for an economic boost even through the Great Depression, before overpopulation and poor infrastructure led to the city's decline. A heritage project revitalized the city in the 1990s, leading to it developing a downtown culture. Through its history, Flagstaff has also been an astronomy hot-spot, given its altitude of around 7,000 feet (2,100 m) and pollution-free skies.

== Early settlements ==
Different forms of pre-Columbian structures in the Flagstaff area

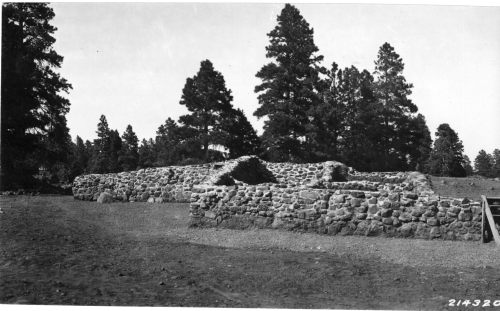
Elden Pueblo ruins in 1926

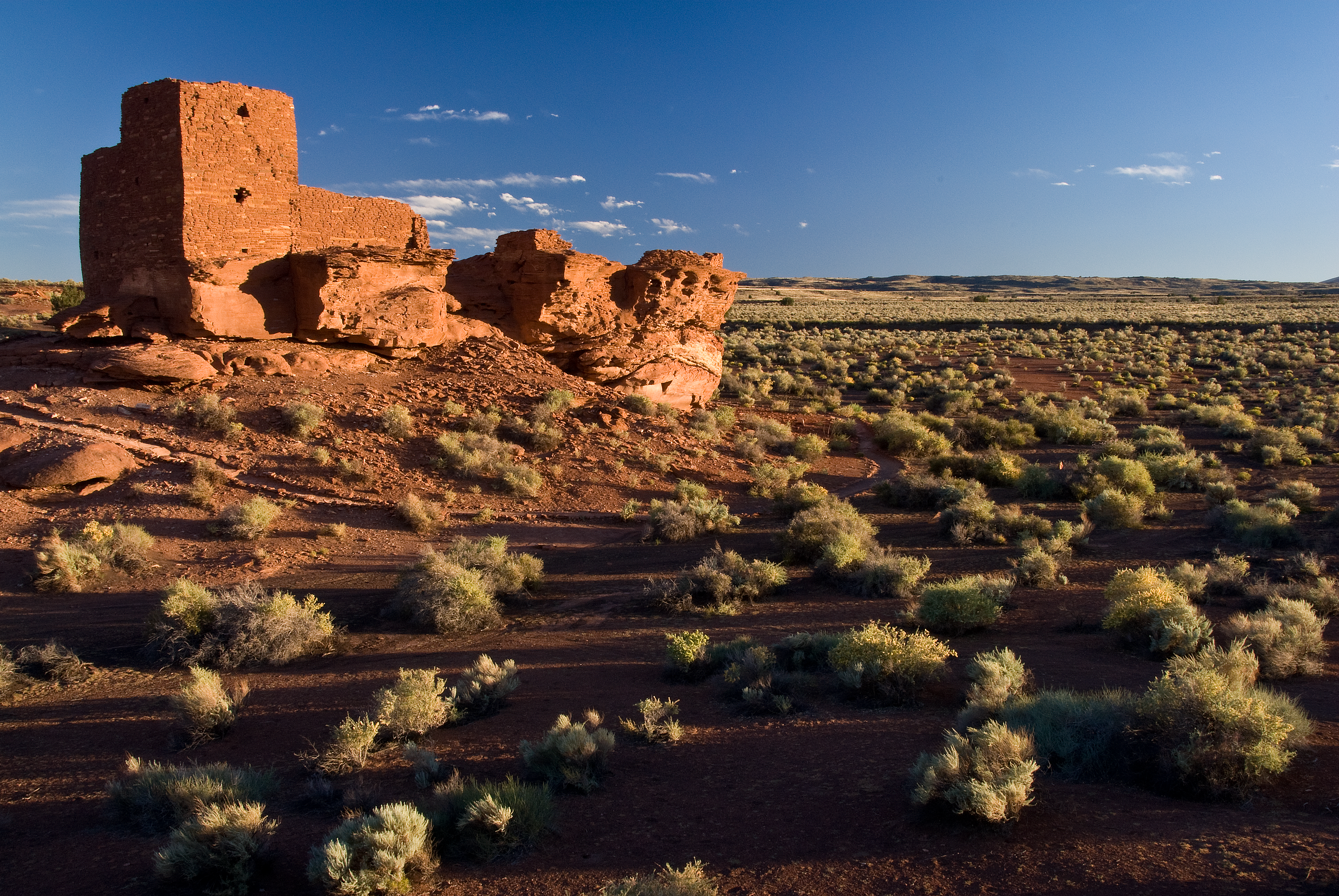
Wukoki ruins in 2008

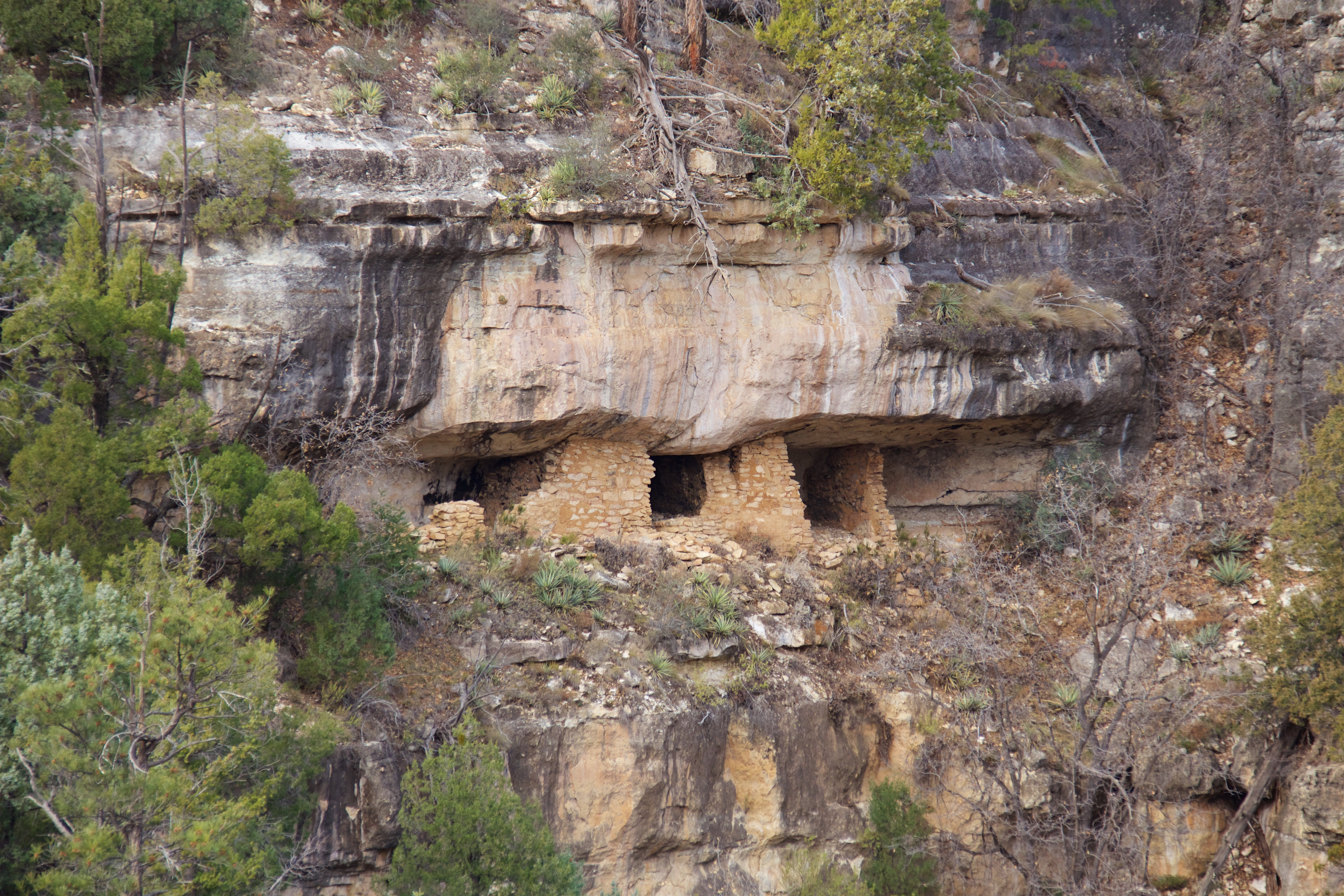
Cliff dwellings at Walnut Canyon in 2015

The Sinagua people (Note: Coined later from the Spanish for "without water" (sin and agua).) were a pre-Columbian culture that occupied a large area in Arizona from the Little Colorado River, near Flagstaff, to the Verde River near Sedona, including the Verde Valley, area around the San Francisco Peaks, and significant portions of the Mogollon Rim country, between approximately 500 CE and 1425 CE. The Northern Sinagua began living in the pine forests of northern Arizona in the 5th century before moving into the area that is now Flagstaff in about 700 CE.

Though a largely hunter-gatherer culture, Sinagua farmers cultivated maize beginning in the 8th century. They learned irrigation techniques from their southern Hohokam neighbors and added beans and squash to their crops. The 1064 and 1066 eruptions of Sunset Crater covered the area in ash, which greatly enriched the soil for farming.

Guy Gibbon mapped the cultural phases of the Northern Sinagua, placing them around Sunset Crater between 700 CE and 900 CE (leaving the Wupatki National Monument ruins); the Rio de Flag from 900 to 1066 (leaving the Picture Canyon site); Angell and Winona between 1066 and 1100; Padre Canyon from 1100 to 1150; Elden Pueblo between 1150 and 1250; Turkey Hill Pueblo from 1250 to 1300; and Clear Creek between 1300 and 1400. They are also believed to have worked the land around Walnut Canyon from around 600 CE until the mid-13th century, farming at the rim before moving into cliff dwellings in the canyon in the 12th century.

The Sunset Crater eruption and subsequent agricultural benefits also caused a population growth in the area, with Ancestral Puebloans and Cohonina people also moving to the Wupatki site.

Sinagua peoples left the area by the early 15th century. Like other pre-Columbian cultures in the southwest, the Sinagua apparently abandoned their permanent settlements around this time, though the precise reasons for such a large-scale abandonment are not yet known; resource depletion, drought, and clashes with the newly arrived Yavapai people have been suggested. The Sinagua likely moved north to Homolovi and beyond, becoming the Hopi. The San Francisco Peaks (which mark the city of Flagstaff's northern border) are a sacred site in Hopi culture, and the culture of many other southwestern Native groups.

Archeological and linguistic evidence suggests that the Yavapai people began developing independently from the Patayan at some point around 1300 CE. Until western expansion in the 1860s, the Yavapai, specifically the Wi:pukba (Northeastern Yavapai), occupied the land up to the San Francisco Peaks. Wi:pukba groups had tumultuous relations with the nearby Havasupai and Hualapai people from around 1750. Though the Pai peoples all spoke Upland Yuman dialects, and had a common cultural history, each peoples had tales of a dispute that separated them from each other; according to myth, the dispute began with a "mudball fight between children". The Yavapai land in the area saw overlap with the land of the Northern Tonto Apache that stretched across the San Francisco Peaks to the Little Colorado River.

Of the Northern Tonto Apache, two tribes lived within the area of present-day Flagstaff: the Oak Creek band and the Mormon Lake band. Only the Mormon Lake band consisted entirely of Apache Indians, as the other three Northern Tonto bands mixed with the Yavapai; the Mormon Lake band also faced off against the Navajo to the north and east of their land. The Oak Creek band was largely centered near Sedona, but lived as far north as Flagstaff, with the Mormon Lake band centered around Flagstaff. They were exclusively hunter-gatherers, and traveled around places like the foot of the San Francisco Peaks, at Mount Elden, Lake Mary, Stoneman Lake, and Padre Canyon.

A US Army Corps of Engineers book notes that Flagstaff did not have a colonial Spanish presence. There were Spanish missionaries about 65 miles (105 km) away in 1629, originating the San Francisco name in Arizona, with later 17th century Spanish Franciscans giving the San Francisco Peaks their name.

== Establishment ==
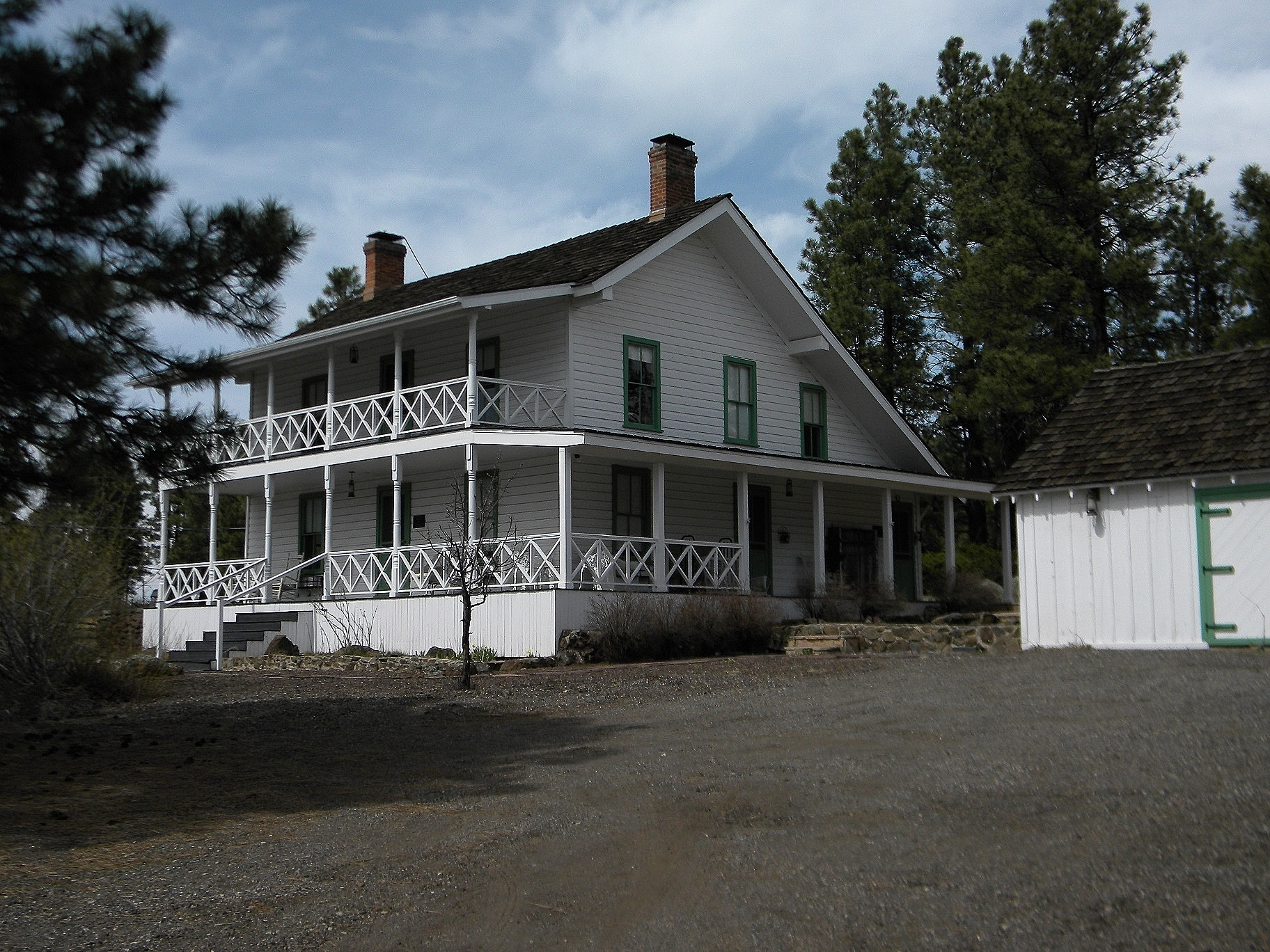
The McMillan Homestead (1886) in 2016

The area of Flagstaff had a wagon road to California in the 1800s, constructed by Edward Fitzgerald Beale's men, with a spring (Antelope/Old Town Spring) nearby. There was also a supplies station situated 7 miles northwest of the present city, near Leroux Springs, from 1856 to about 1876. The Leroux Springs are named for Antoine Leroux, the guide of the Sitgreaves Expedition who led them to the spring in 1851. It has been suggested that Flagstaff owes its existence to Leroux and this expedition; Beale was an admirer of Leroux and made sure his paths traveled by the springs, and in turn it was from Beale's wagon road that the city developed.

The first white (non-Native) settlement in the area was established by Edward Whipple, who opened a saloon on the wagon road in 1871. At the time, the area was known as Antelope Spring. The first permanent settlement came in 1876, when Thomas F. McMillan built a cabin just north of the present-day main town. McMillan had been born in Tennessee, but prospected gold in California and reared sheep in Australia; in northern Arizona he started a successful sheep farm. McMillan was a key developer of northern Arizona.

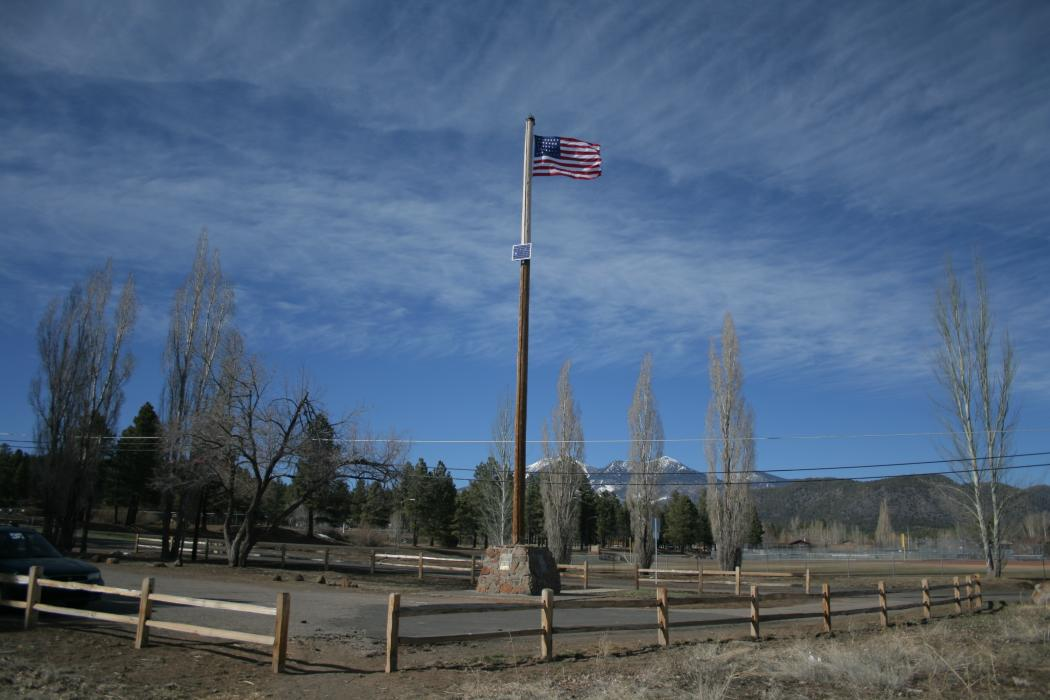
Flagstaff's eponymous flagstaff

The city was founded on July 4, 1876, with a flag-raising. A ponderosa pine flagpole made by a scouting party from Boston (known as the "Second Boston Party") was raised to celebrate the United States Centennial. This flag-raising also gave the city its name, though other stories have been told of flagstaffs that supposedly named the city: one story says that on July 4, 1855, a surveyor for the railroad and his team climbed a tall pine tree and tied a flag, with another saying it was Beale's men who raised the flag in 1859.

The town was known by different names when the Atlantic and Pacific Railroad was being built through the area in 1882. It may have been known as Flagstaff Spring for a while, and 'Old Town Spring' after this before simply 'Old Town'. (Note: In all sources, 'Old Town' (and variations) is written within apostrophes or quotation marks.) The name 'Old Town' was given to the original settlement either before or after a fire destroyed it. For the former, the story goes that the railroad depot was moved by half a mile to avoid hill starts, and business owners soon followed it, displacing the commerce of the town to Front Street of 'New Town' while the houses were still in 'Old Town' with the spring; when the fire burned down 'Old Town', 'New Town' remained. For the latter, the story says that after the fire destroyed much of the town, a new community was then raised a few hundred yards away and called 'New Town', deeming the burnt-out area the 'Old Town'. Local Moenkopi red sandstone had been used as the foundation for many of the buildings in town, and is fire-resistant; it soon became the choice building material for complete structures. The name Flagstaff was reinstated in 1884 when a post office was introduced alongside the railroad depot.

== Development ==
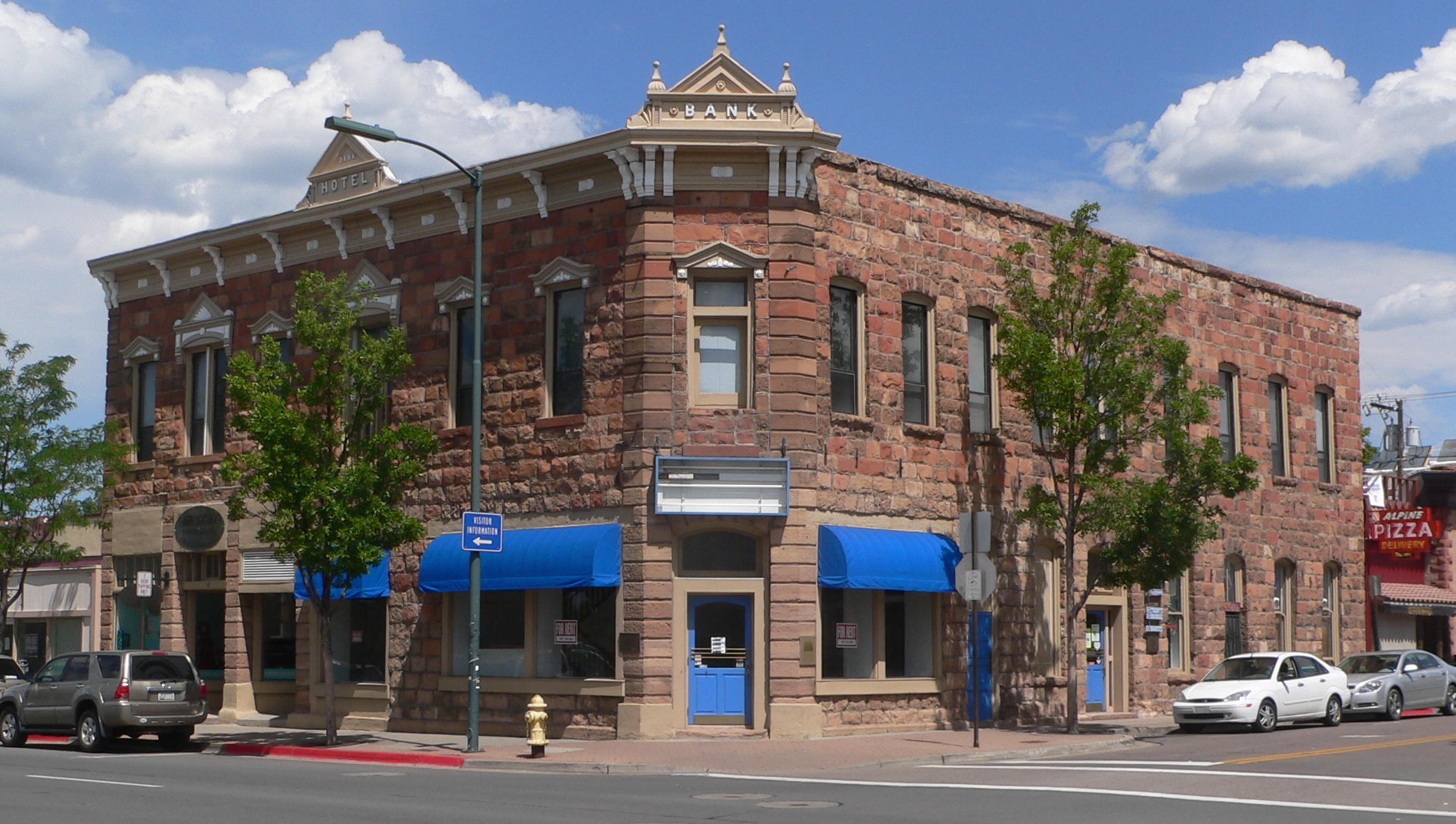
The Bank Hotel, also known as the McMillan building, in 2012

During the 1880s, Flagstaff began to grow, with the early economy based on timber, sheep, and cattle. By 1886, Flagstaff was the largest city on the railroad line between Albuquerque and the west coast of the United States. In this year, it had a population of 600 and "more saloons than all other businesses combined". In 1888, McMillan purchased an unfinished building that sits at the present-day intersection of Leroux Street and Route 66/Santa Fe Avenue, turning it into a bank and hotel known as the Bank Hotel. Coconino County was created in 1891, and Flagstaff was chosen as its county seat over nearby Williams; McMillan became chairman of the Board of Supervisors for the new county.

The next year, stagecoach tours to the Grand Canyon began running from the Bank Hotel, which also housed an opera house that doubled as an events hall for entertainment. In 1894, Massachusetts astronomer Percival Lowell hired A. E. Douglass to scout an ideal site for a new observatory. Douglass, impressed by Flagstaff's elevation, suggested it to Lowell, saying: "other things being equal, the higher we can get the better". The Lowell Observatory was constructed on Mars Hill, overlooking the town. Two years later, the specially designed 24-inch (610 mm) Clark Telescope that Lowell had ordered was installed.

Flagstaff became incorporated as a town in 1894. The city grew rapidly, primarily due to its location along the east–west transcontinental railroad line in the United States. By the 1890s, Flagstaff found itself along one of the busiest railroad corridors in the U.S., with about 80 to 100 trains traveling through the city every day, destined for Chicago, Los Angeles, and elsewhere. In this decade, the Arizona Lumber and Timber Company was founded by the Riordan brothers to process timber. Michael and Tim Riordan worked in Flagstaff, and introduced electricity to the town for this purpose. The Riordans also built the Lake Mary area of Flagstaff, and Michael Riordan took a particular interest in protecting the surrounding native ruins of the present Walnut Canyon National Monument. The CO Bar Ranch was opened in about 1886 by the Babbitt brothers for cattle. Five Babbitt brothers from a mercantile background in Cincinnati – Billy, Charlie, Dave, Edward, and George – had set their eyes on becoming ranchers out West and sent Billy and Dave with $20,000 to buy a ranch; the brothers were told of some good, cheap, land just east of Flagstaff when in Albuquerque and took the railroad there, arriving in February 1886.

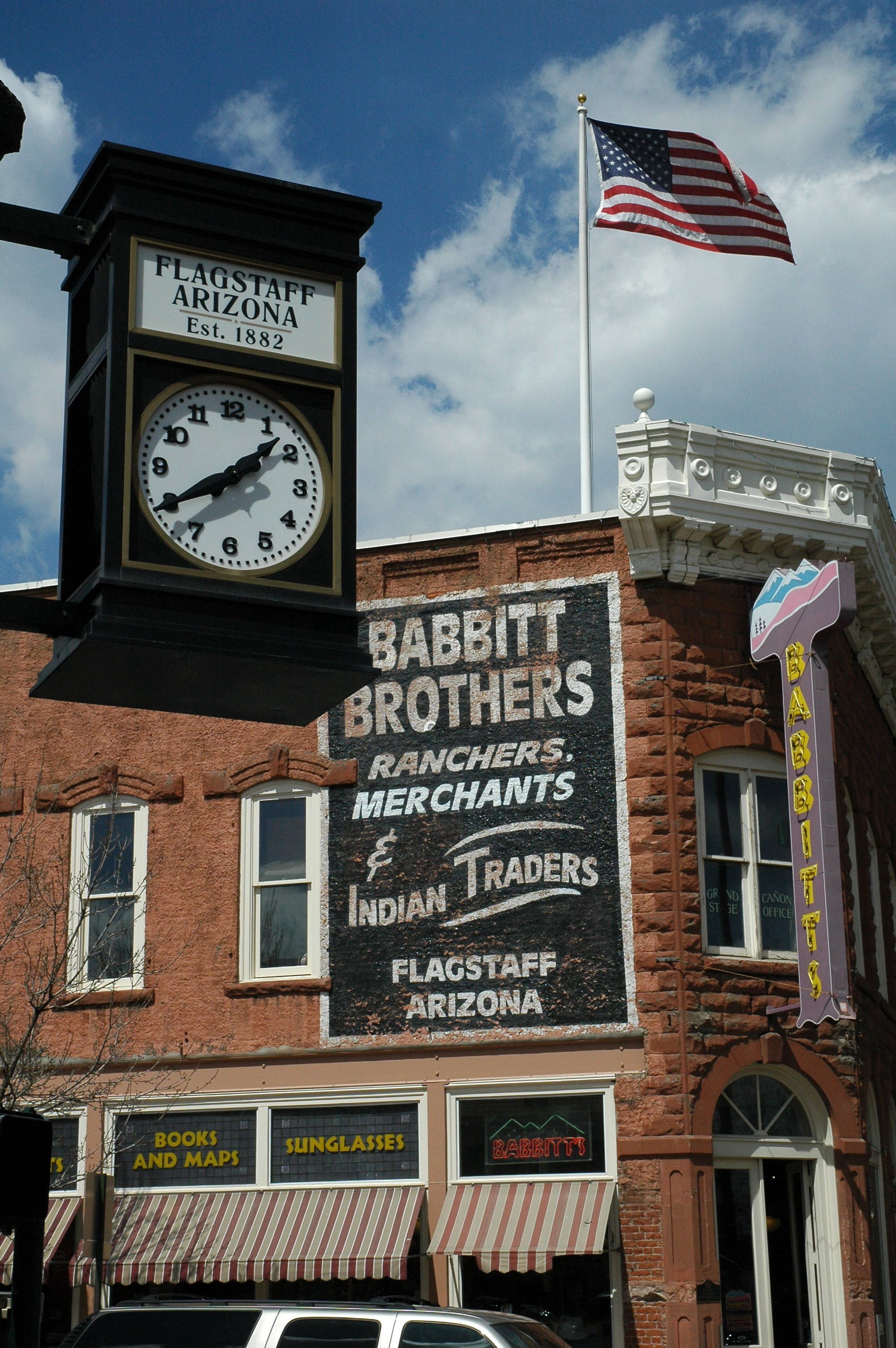
Part of the Babbitt Brothers Building (1888) in 2007

After some years, the other Babbitt brothers also moved to Flagstaff. Three of the brothers married three daughters of a Dutch merchant, who advised the men to expand their business across many avenues, which they did, opening all kinds of stores, theaters, and even a mortuary in 1892, investing their money across northern Arizona. They also introduced sheep to their cattle farm, with Billy and Charlie working as cowboys. The Babbitt family would be very influential in northern Arizona for decades (one descendant is former Governor of Arizona and Clinton's Secretary of the Interior, Bruce Babbitt). According to True West Magazine, "it was said, God made northern Arizona, and then he turned it over to the Babbitts to run."

The Northern Arizona Normal School was established in 1899, renamed Northern Arizona University (NAU) in 1966. In local culture, the Flagstaff Symphony made its concert debut at Babbitt's Opera House on April 11, 1899; the orchestra continues today as the Flagstaff Symphony Orchestra, with its primary venue at the Ardrey Auditorium on the campus of Northern Arizona University.

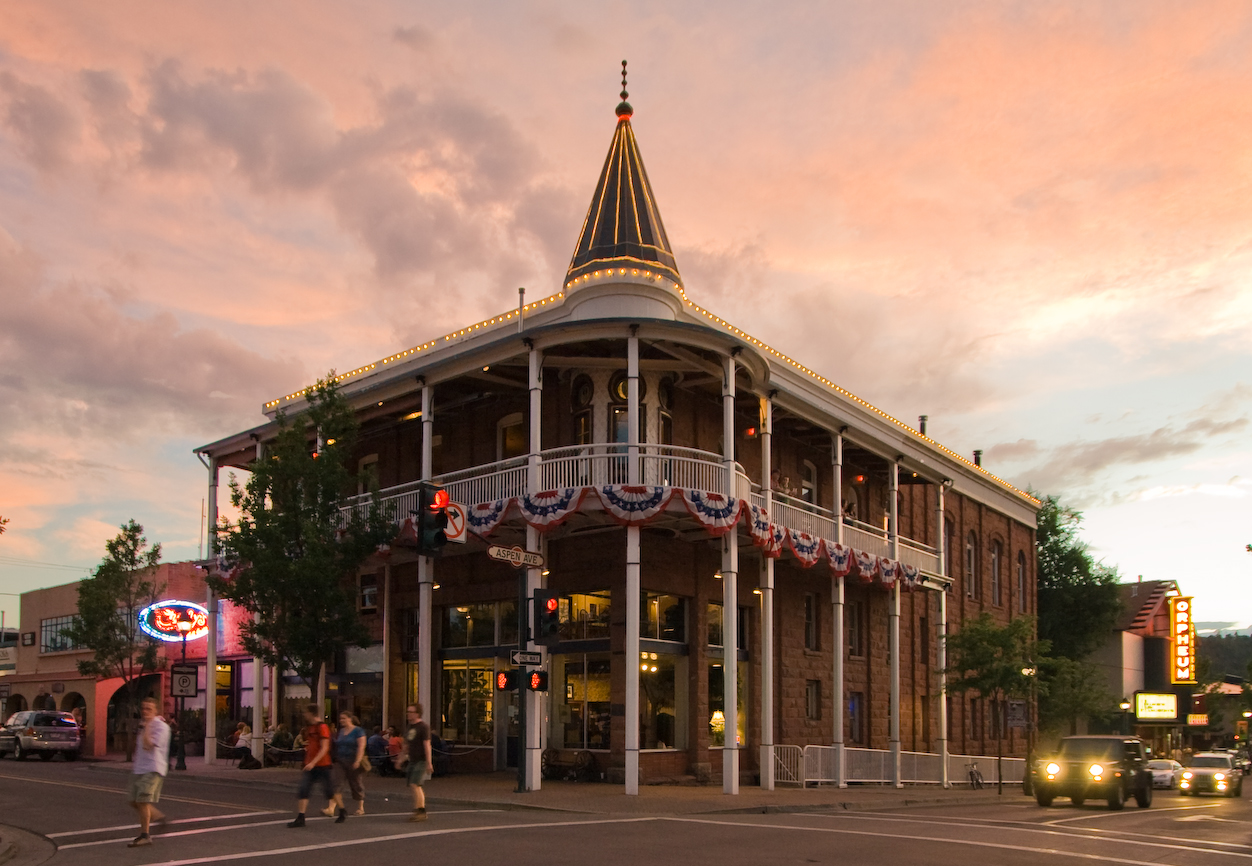
The Weatherford Hotel in 2007, with the Orpheum next to it

On January 1, 1900, John Weatherford opened the Weatherford Hotel in Flagstaff. In c. 1900, journalist Sharlot Hall described the houses in Flagstaff as a "third rate mining camp", with bad air and expensive goods. The Babbitts saw the height of their "cattle empire" between 1907 and 1919, with around 100 ranches between Kansas and California funded by the brothers in the 40 years after their arrival in Flagstaff; the brothers are remembered as benevolent, often allowing their partners running the ranches unlimited credit. In 1906, McMillan died; his family had been living in the Bank Hotel, which would soon pass to his son-in-law's family. Weatherford opened the town's first movie theater in 1911; it collapsed under heavy snowfall a few years later, but he soon replaced it with the Orpheum Theater. The Weatherford Hotel and Orpheum Theater are still in use today.

The state of Arizona was admitted to the Union in 1912; one of the first two senators was Henry F. Ashurst, who had been born in Nevada but whose family moved to a ranch near Williams when he was two years old, with Ashurst attending school in Flagstaff. At the age of ten he showed his ambition to be a Senator by writing "Henry Fountain Ashurst, U.S. Senator from Arizona" into a speller. After dropping out of school at the age of thirteen, he worked as a cowboy on his father's ranch. At the age of nineteen, Ashurst was made the turnkey at the county jail in Flagstaff. While working at the jail, he developed an interest in the law by reading Blackstone's Commentaries. Ashurst was admitted to the bar in 1897 and began a law practice in Williams, and met his wife in Flagstaff.

Flagstaff saw its first tourism boom in the early years of the 1900s, becoming known as the City of Seven Wonders, as the "Seven Wonders" of the wider Flagstaff area – listed as the Coconino National Forest, Grand Canyon, Oak Creek Canyon, San Francisco Peaks, Sunset Crater, Walnut Canyon, and Wupatki National Monument – were more widely known. (Note: Other nearby natural wonders include Canyon de Chelly, Lake Powell, Meteor Crater, Monument Valley, the Painted Desert, the Petrified Forest National Park, Picture Canyon, and Rainbow Bridge National Monument.)

== Route 66 and city growth ==
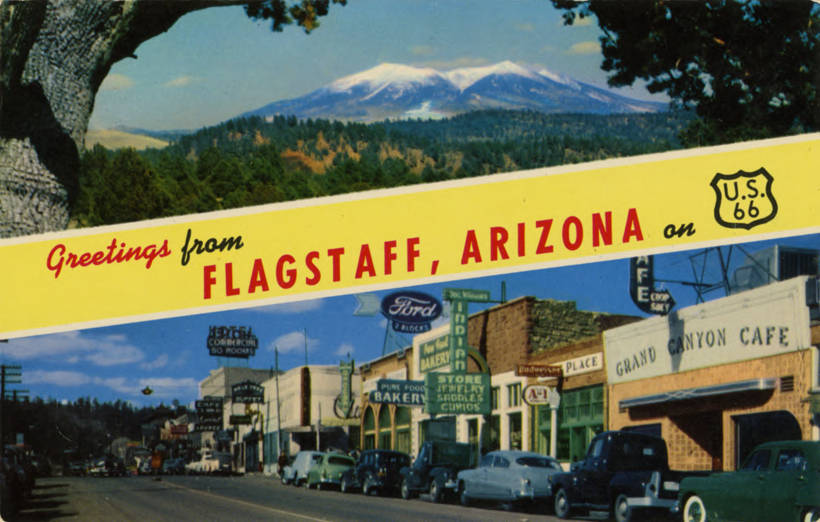
A 1950s postcard depicting the San Francisco Peaks and downtown Flagstaff on Route 66

The railroad, which became the Santa Fe Railroad, had largely controlled Flagstaff – being its main source of industry and transport – until Route 66 was completed in 1926, with a section through Flagstaff. Route 66 had been supported by the businessmen of Flagstaff as early as 1912, knowing that the town was close to natural wonders that would make it a commercial opportunity, with the Babbitt family opening a car dealership. However, the university (then called Northern Arizona Teachers' College) and local media were against the rise of automobiles. Seeing a rise in tourism, the people of Flagstaff collectively funded the Hotel Monte Vista, which opened on January 1, 1927, with Weatherford having begun construction of a toll road up the nearby San Francisco Peaks in the early 1920s.

Flagstaff was then incorporated as a city in 1928, with over 3,000 residents, and in 1929, the city's first motel, the Motel Du Beau, was built at the intersection of Beaver Street and Phoenix Avenue. The Daily Sun described the motel as "a hotel with garages for the better class of motorists." The units originally rented for $2.60 to $5.00 each, with baths, toilets, double beds, carpets, and furniture. Flagstaff became a popular tourist stop along Route 66, particularly due to its proximity to the Grand Canyon, Painted Desert, and the Petrified Forest National Park. To combat Route 66, the Santa Fe Railroad opened a new depot in Flagstaff in 1926. As part of the celebrations, Front Street was renamed Santa Fe Avenue. In 1927, Flagstaff's primary industry was still timber, though farming persisted into the 1920s. The city produced the majority of Arizona's timber supply that year, and was economically powered by the competing Arizona Lumber and Timber and Flagstaff Lumber companies, but in the last years of the decade, tourism took over and the face of the main commercial district changed to diners and motels in place of saloons. In 1928 the Museum of Northern Arizona opened in the city, and in the same year its workers prevented the destruction of Sunset Crater for use in a movie explosion.

At the start of the Great Depression, the massive expansion of Flagstaff and Coconino County during the 1920s was seen as likely unsustainable with a lower income. It was made worse by the unemployed workers traveling Route 66 to California stopping in Flagstaff, and young jobless Canadians venturing to the area for exploration having to be supported by the city before being deported. Southard wrote that the "down-on-their-luck migrants taxed the resources of their host cities, while contributing little to the local economy". Known as "auto nomads" in Flagstaff, out-of-work families relocating to the city with children were particularly taxing on the public school system, and even those that did not stay long became unpopular as they could not afford to buy gas or food. Flagstaff had also been highlighted on the map by Clyde Tombaugh's 1930 discovery of Pluto from the Lowell Observatory; the planet was in part named for Percival Lowell (PL). However, some Flagstaff residents attempted charitable endeavors, including setting up food banks and imploring hunters in the local area to donate a percentage of each kill to them. This did not last long, as in the winter of 1931–32, a rumor that California had closed its borders to Mid West migrants spread through Arizona, with people from places like Flagstaff and Yuma, the last cities on major cross-country highways before California, demanding that Arizona be closed to migrants, too.

The importance of Route 66 to cross-country travel, and thus to Arizona's interests on a national level, did mean that it received a large share of state funding through the Depression, though, with highway maintenance and unemployment acts providing over $1 million of funding in May 1933. Flagstaff's unemployed soon became highway construction workers, and by the end of 1934, Flagstaff had financially recovered to pre-Depression levels, aided by tax cuts and continued tourism; in 1935, many residents had enough disposable income to remodel their homes or build new ones. In 1936, based on the city's continued economic upswing, General Petroleum announced it was building a new refinery just outside of town. The first hospital in the city was also opened in 1936, by Charles Sechrist. At the outbreak of World War II, Route 66, now well- paved and maintained, was used to transport military outfits, bringing more prosperity to Flagstaff and doubling its population.

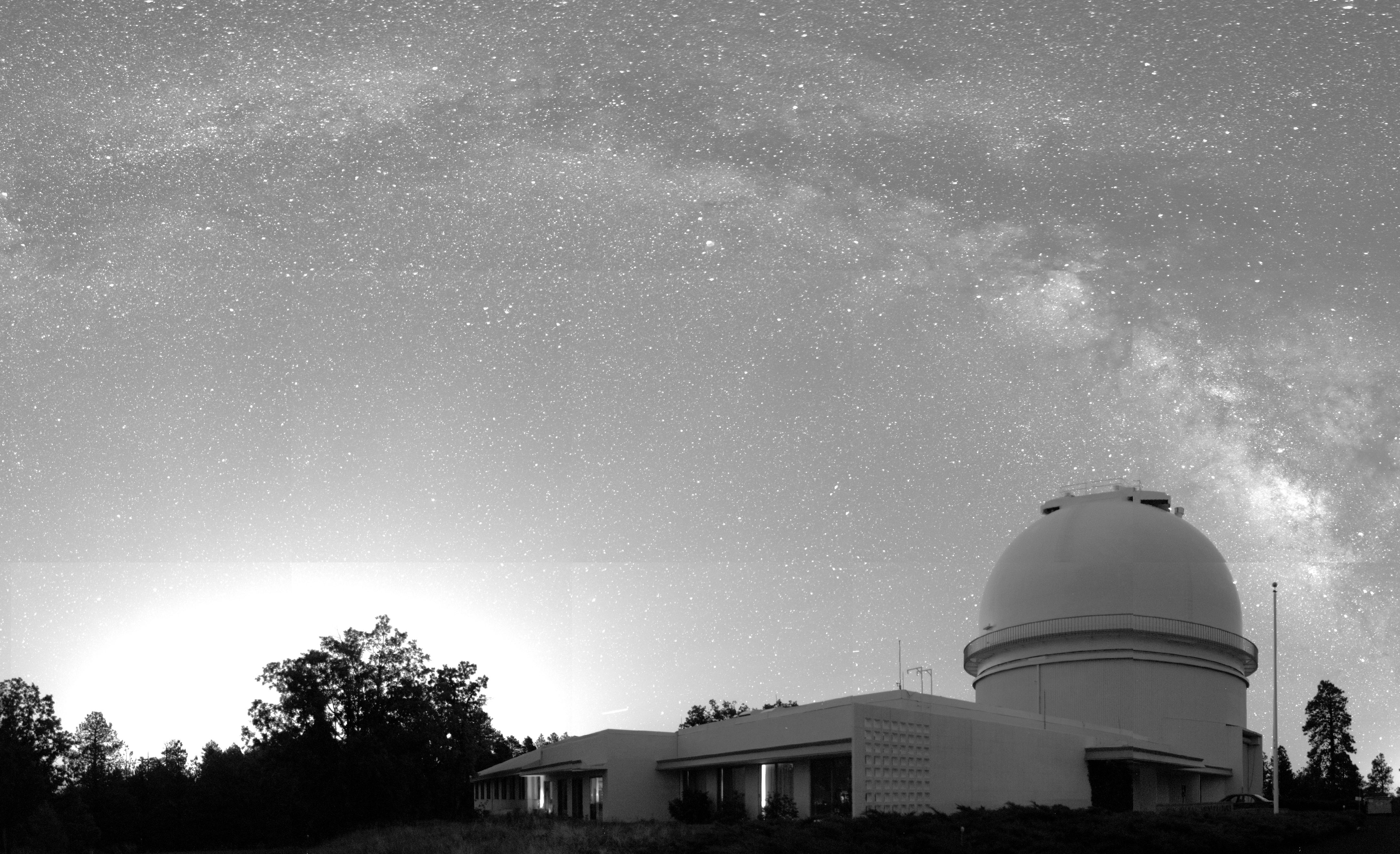
The Naval Observatory during Dark Sky monitoring in 2008

People from the city had created the first ski run in the mountains in 1938, using a family cabin; in the 1950s Route 180 was paved north of the city to provide better access towards Valle for skiers and Grand Canyon tourists, making the city into a seasonal ski resort. In 1955 the U.S. Naval Observatory joined the growing astronomical presence, and established the United States Naval Observatory Flagstaff Station, where Pluto's satellite Charon was discovered in 1978. The Naval Observatory also observed the Dark Sky presence of the area; in 1958, the city introduced light restrictions to maintain this. Through the 1950s the city conducted the Urban Renewal Project, improving housing quality in the Southside neighborhood that was largely populated by people of Spanish, Basque, and Mexican heritage. At the end of the 1950s, the Glen Canyon Dam was constructed north of the city, with the construction efforts meaning that a road that would become Interstate 17 between the town of Verde Valley and Flagstaff was laid to carry resources, providing better north–south access and directly connecting Flagstaff to Phoenix; scientists from the area also spent the decade to 1962, when Glen Canyon was flooded for the dam, documenting its archeological history.

Flagstaff grew and prospered through the 1960s, with a train running through the city on average every eighteen minutes through the decade. In 1964, the Lowell Observatory received a designation as a National Historic Landmark. Buffalo Park, a large open park with free-roaming wildlife within the city, was opened in 1966. During the Apollo program in the 1960s, the Clark Telescope was used by the United States Geological Survey (USGS) to map the Moon for the lunar expeditions, enabling the mission planners to choose a safe landing site for the lunar modules. Astronauts also trained in the cinder cones around Flagstaff. In homage to the city's importance in the field of astronomy, a selection of asteroids and minor planets have been named in relation to the city, including 2118 Flagstaff, named for the city; 6582 Flagsymphony, named for the Flagstaff Symphony Orchestra in its 50th season; 5463 Danwelcher, named for Dan Welcher to commemorate his conducting of the Flagstaff Symphony Orchestra, notably with a set itself commemorating the centenary of the Lowell Observatory and Flagstaff's founding; 1886 Lowell, named for the astronomer and discovered with his telescope; 793 Arizona, named by Lowell for the state in which it was discovered, at his observatory; 2939 Coconino, named for the county (the city and state names had already been assigned).

== Decline and resurgence ==
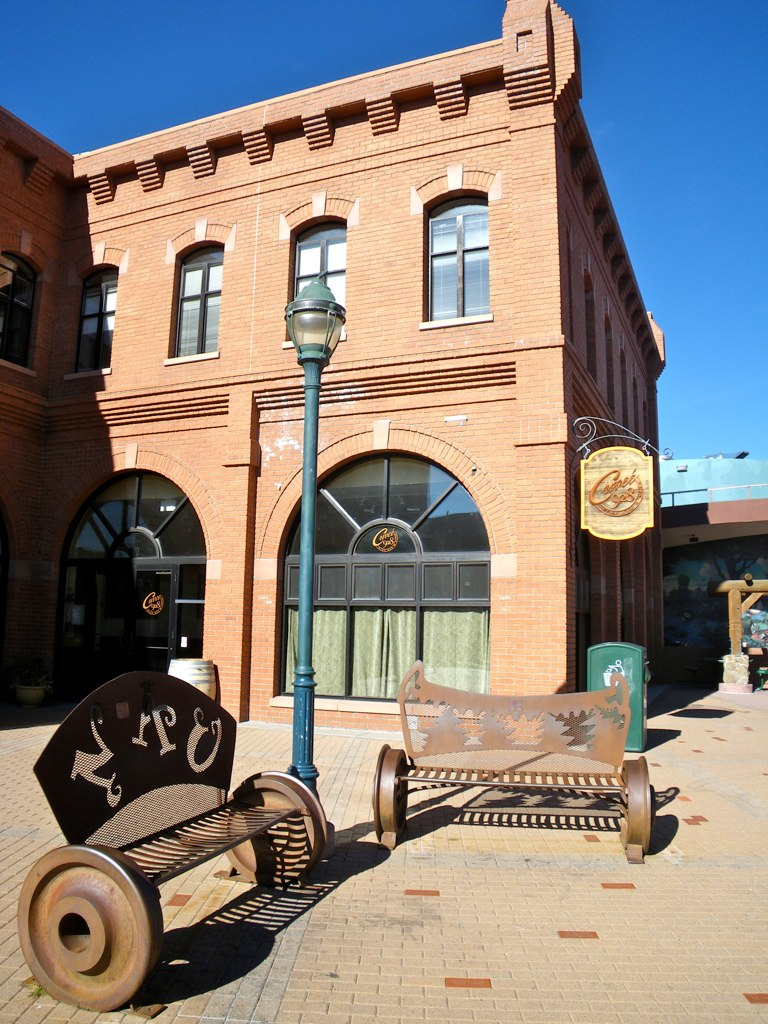
Benches commemorating Flagstaff's traditional labor forces in Heritage Square

As the baby boomer generation began to start their own families in the 1970s and 1980s, many moved to Flagstaff based on its small-town feel, and the population began to grow again; there were not enough jobs to support the many educated individuals moving to the city. W. L. Gore and Associates had opened a Flagstaff plant in 1967, and took on qualified workers. The student population (at college and high school) also grew, but the city did not expand its infrastructure downtown, causing problems. Several historic buildings from the 19th century were also destroyed for construction of new ones, or leveled completely. Downtown became an uninviting place, and many businesses started to move out of the area, causing an economic and social decline. Sears and J.C. Penney left the downtown area in 1979 to open up as anchor stores in the new Flagstaff Mall, joined in 1986 by Dillard's. By 1987, the Babbitt Brothers Trading Company, a retail fixture in Flagstaff since 1891, closed its doors at Aspen Avenue and San Francisco Street. To protect historic buildings in downtown, the Railroad Addition Historic District was added to the National Register of Historic Places in 1983.

In 1987, the city drafted a new master plan, also known as the Growth Management Guide 2000, which would transform downtown Flagstaff from a shopping and trade center into a regional center for finance, office use, and government. The city built a new city hall, library, and the Coconino County Administrative Building in the downtown district. During the 1990s, downtown instead became more cultural again. Store owners in downtown supported the Main Street programs of preservation-based revitalization, and in 1992, the city hired a new manager, Dave Wilcox, who had previously worked at revitalizing the downtown areas of Beloit, Wisconsin and Missoula, Montana. As a result, many of the downtown sidewalks were repaved with decorative brick facing and a different mix of shops and restaurants opened up to take advantage of the area's historical appeal. The historic sandstone buildings were restored, and parts of downtown became targeted towards tourism. After the Railroad Addition district became protected, and the historic quality of the city was appreciated by officials, more neighborhoods became registered as historic districts, controlling what works can take place. Heritage Square was built as the center of the revitalized downtown, including mapping the history of the area on various structures. The local Flagstaff Pulliam Airport began running more flights to Phoenix, allowing commuting, and the school district was expanded with a third high school, Sinagua High School. Microbreweries opened downtown in the early 1990s, as did craft restaurants, and a partnership to protect the surrounding forests was created.

On October 24, 2001, Flagstaff was recognized by the International Dark-Sky Association as the world's first "International Dark-Sky City", and in 2012 it was officially named "America's First STEM Community" by Flagstaff Mayor Jerry Nabours. Industrial use of the city grew in the 21st century: SenesTech started in 2004, a major producer of pest control agents, and was the first publicly traded company headquartered in Flagstaff until it downsized and moved to Phoenix in 2020. The Nestlé Purina PetCare factory in East Flagstaff is also a major industry hub, though is often under fire for making the city smell like dog food; mitigation acts were enforced in 2003 and 2020. A new industry also sprouted in the 2010s, with Flagstaff becoming an altitude training destination for elite athletes. While the first elite athletes to start altitude training in the city were those going to the 1968 Summer Olympics in Mexico City, the HYPO2 center in the city trained over 85 Olympic medalists from 44 countries between 2012 and 2019. Though the population and industry has continued to grow, the demographics have changed, and in 2010 Sinagua High School became a middle school to account for this.

== See also ==
- List of historic properties in Flagstaff, Arizona
- History of Arizona
