= Rio de Flag =

River in Arizona, United States

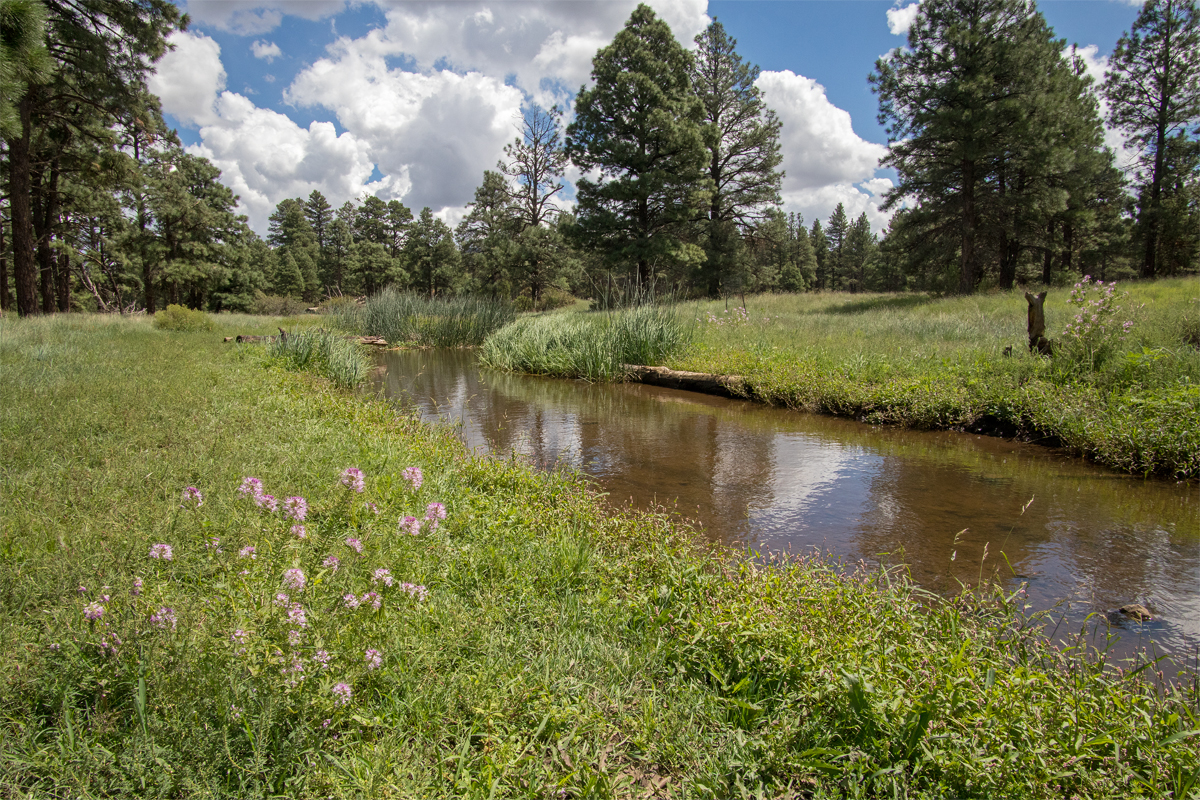

Physical characteristics
- Source: Leroux Springs
  - location: San Francisco Peaks, Arizona
  - coordinates: 35°17′36″N 111°43′30″W
  - elevation: 8,000 feet (2,400 m)
- Mouth: San Francisco Wash
  - location: Walnut Creek, Arizona
  - coordinates: 35°14′12″N 111°10′43″W
  - elevation: 7,000 feet (2,100 m)
- Length: 33 mi (53 km)

Basin features
- Tributaries
  - left: Schultz Creek
  - right: Sinclair Wash
- Waterbodies: Frances Short Pond, Logan's Crossing
- Waterfalls: Picture Canyon

The Rio de Flag, which has historically been known as the River de Flag and San Francisco River, is a river in Arizona that runs through Flagstaff, originating from the San Francisco Peaks before draining into the Little Colorado River. The river's age is unknown, though its first channels were around over one million years ago.

== Headwaters ==
Four springs in the San Francisco Peaks originate the river; they would not produce enough water to maintain flow if not for the heavy rain and snowfall of the area supplementing the levels in the channel. The main headwaters of the river are the Leroux Springs, located 1 mile (1.6 km) up Snowbowl Road just northwest of the city, with Taylor Spring and Chimney Spring also sourcing it, and most of the south face snowmelt filling the river, too. Edward Fitzgerald Beale and his men, in planning for his wagon road, visited the Leroux Springs on September 12, 1857. He described the spring and the start of the river as such: "Leroux's spring is one of transparent sparkling water, and bursts out of the side of the mountain and runs gurgling down for a quarter of a mile, where it loses itself in the valley. To reach it we found it necessary to turn from the course we were steering, and go up into a little mountain glen from which it flows into the valley." Other springs of the river include Antelope/Old Town Spring, by the base of Mars Hill, and San Francisco Spring by the McMillan homestead.

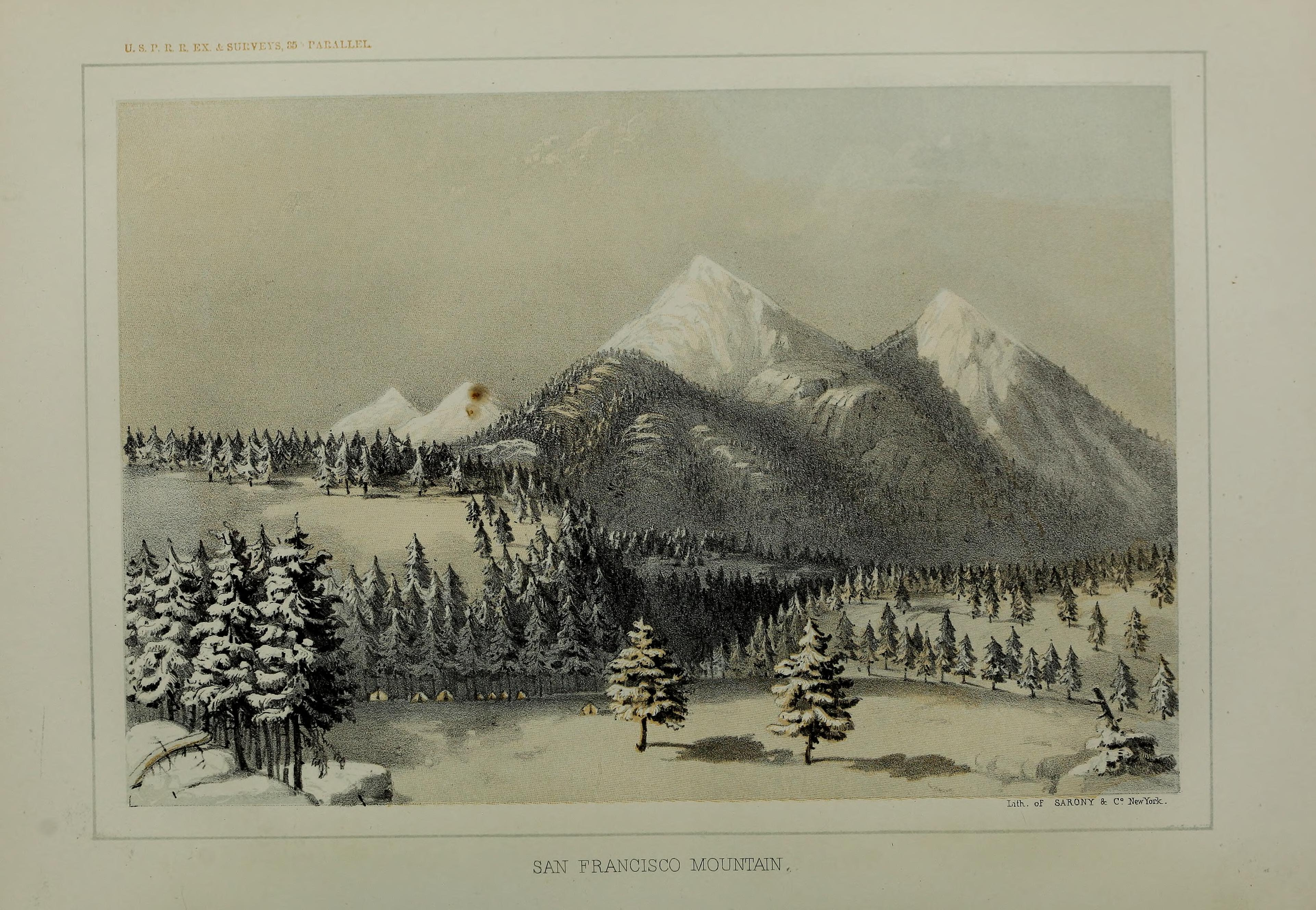
The San Francisco Peaks as seen from a stream by the Leroux Springs c. 1855

The Leroux Springs are two separate sources: Big Leroux Spring and Little Leroux Spring. The Leroux Springs are named for Antoine Leroux, the guide of the Sitgreaves Expedition who led them to the spring in 1851; the bigger spring was given this name by Amiel Weeks Whipple on December 17, 1853, during a later expedition with him. During the Sitgreaves Expedition multiple new species were discovered at the spring, including Abert's squirrel, the Western Pocket Gopher, and Woodhouse's toad. It has been suggested that Flagstaff owes its existence to Leroux and this expedition; Beale was an admirer of Leroux and made sure his paths traveled by the springs, and in turn it was from Beale's wagon road that the city developed. In 1882, Thomas S. Sedgewick of the railroad company planned to construct a water pipeline to connect Big Leroux Spring to Flagstaff, following the course of the river, but the pipeline was not built. The flow of Big Leroux Spring was measured in 1949 at 29 gallons per minute, while the average flow between 2004 and 2013 was 13.5 gallons per minute. During the 20th century, the springs had been modified and sequestered to provide water for the city and for different private owners, with underground pipes particularly reducing the flow. With less need for water from the springs in the 21st century, a project to restore natural flow took place in 2013.

== River route ==
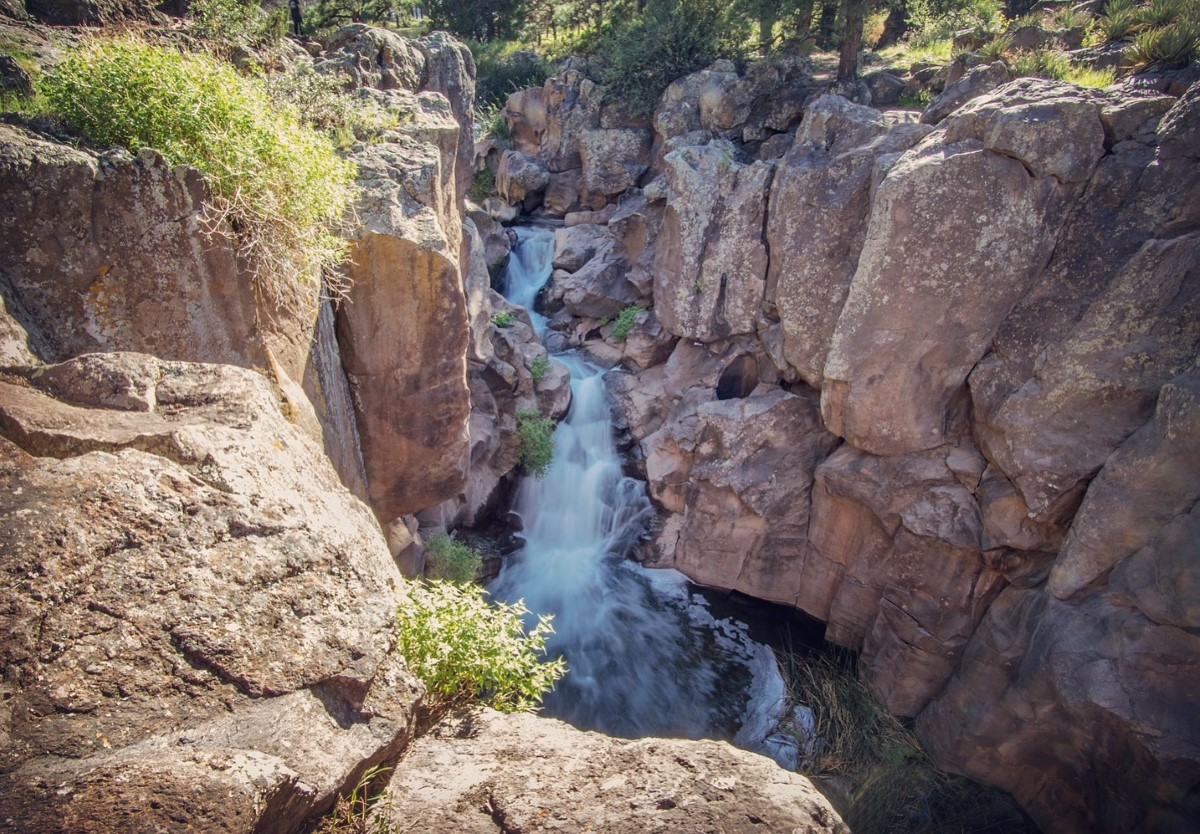
Waterfall at Picture Canyon

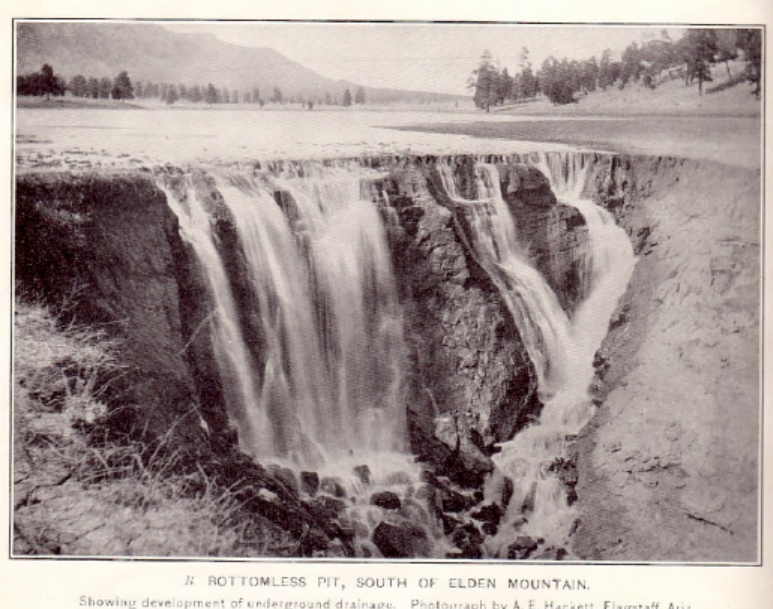
The 'Bottomless Pit' c. 1915

From the mountains, the river roughly follows Route 180 towards the city of Flagstaff. Its Cheshire Wetlands area begins downstream before the city proper, at Cheshire Park near the Museum of Northern Arizona. As the river starts to turn southeast with the highway, Schultz Creek drains into it. The river continues south through downtown Flagstaff, with the Frances Short Pond having formed by Thorpe Park in the west of the city. Here the river crosses Route 66 and starts to turn east again, Sinclair Wash drains into it; the river then crosses Interstate 40 (I-40) at Willow Bend, where the I-40 Wetlands are located. The river then turns northeast towards East Flagstaff and passes through Foxglenn Park before crossing back over I-40 and Route 66 and falling into Picture Canyon, where there is a waterfall between narrow canyon walls. Beyond this, the river crosses Townsend-Winona Road but then follows the road's loop until Logan's Crossing, a wetland and bird sanctuary. After Logan's Crossing, the river turns east-northeast towards the San Francisco Wash and Little Colorado River. The river from Picture Canyon and Logan's Crossing is mostly fed by water from a nearby wastewater treatment plant. At the east of the city lies the 'Bottomless Pit'; volcanism in the area created pits where small lakes of the river formed, and when it rains heavily the river begins to fill in a pit that lies on Kaibab Limestone with a sinkhole 2,000 feet (610 m) deep beneath, the water eventually draining down underground while the pit appears to be bottomless.

Before meeting the Little Colorado, the river has a confluence with Walnut Creek. The river did not always run its current course through the city, as during the 20th century it was rerouted in certain areas to allow urban expansion and as a means of flood control. In 2020, $52 million was awarded to Flagstaff to finish the Rio de Flag Flood Control Project, with Arizona Senator Kyrsten Sinema visiting the project.

== Geology ==
Geologically, the substrate of the river is an igneous rock called basalt, which has many vertical cracks through which water can travel down to the clay sandstone below; where there is stronger flow the water could cut through this rock, but the river is typically small enough that most spring water is absorbed by the stream bed. Other surfaces also affect the river. The soil of the drainage basin of the river absorbs moisture, allowing a slow release into the river of naturally filtered water, but fires in the area can damage this soil. Within the urban areas, non-absorbent surfaces mean that unfiltered rainwater is entering the river, which can contain pollutants poisonous to fish.
