= Darling Cinder Pit =

Cinder mine in Coconino County, Arizona

- Interactive map of Darling Cinder Pit

Location
- Location: Winona, Arizona; 35°12′02″N 111°24′02″W

Production
- Products: Cinder

Darling Cinder Pit is a cinder pit mine near Winona, Arizona. It was named in honor of William B. Darling, a local railroad engineer.

The mine is located near Cinder Mountain, a Tappan age basaltic cinder cone north east of Winona In 1985 it was noted that the pit was the largest cinder-producing site in Arizona, with Arizona having the highest cinder production of any state in the US. It was used by the Santa Fe Railroad to produce pumice for track bed materials. It has also been mined for use scoria to make cinder blocks for the building industry. The railroad installed a Sauerman bucket and an anchor tower to transport rock to hoppers.
