= Walnut Creek (Arizona) =

Stream in Coconino County, Arizona

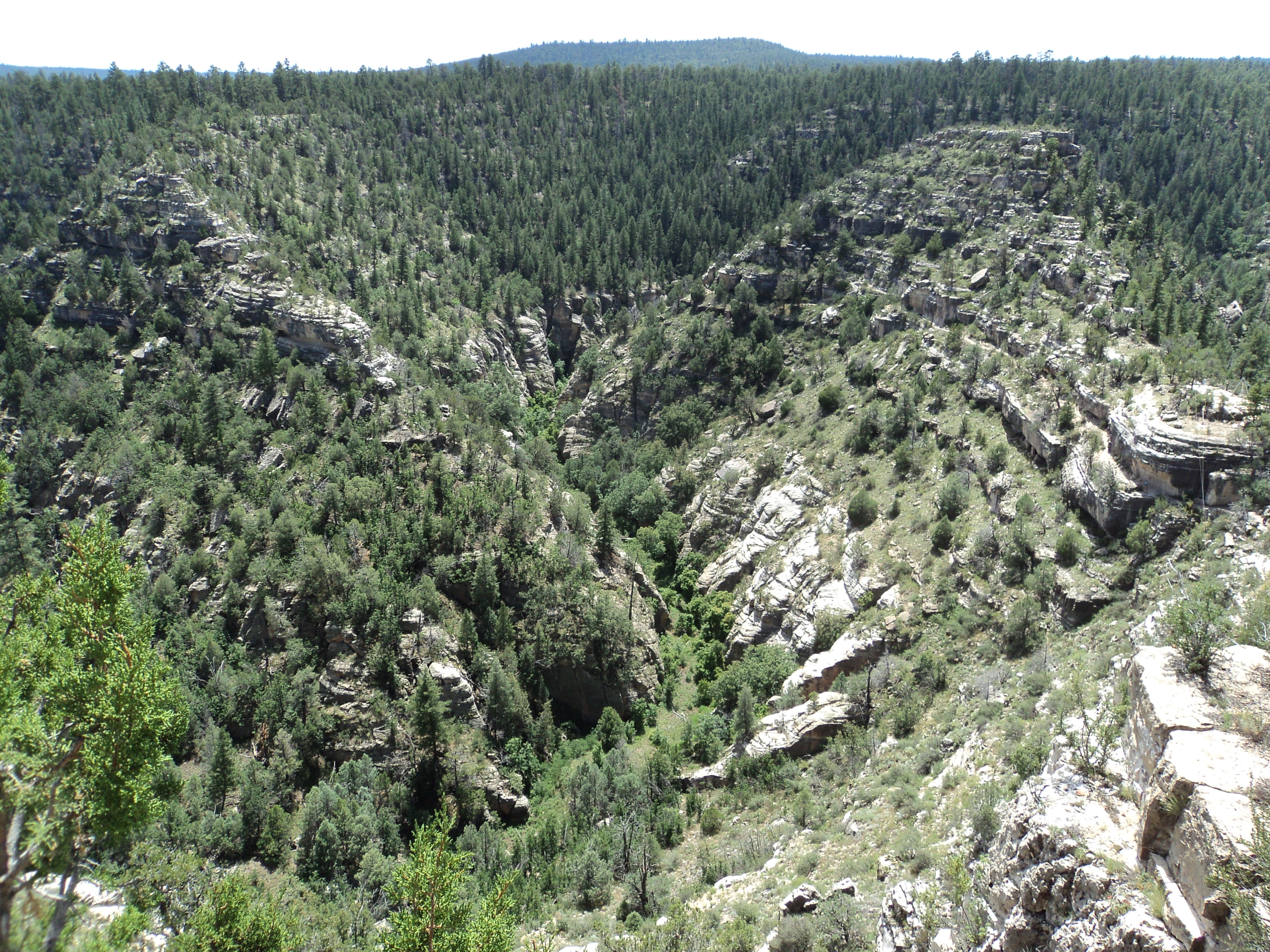
- Walnut Canyon

- Location of the mouth of Walnut Creek in Arizona

Location
- Country: United States
- State: Arizona

Physical characteristics
- Source: Colorado Plateau
  - location: Coconino National Forest
  - coordinates: 34°59′19″N 111°28′19″W
  - elevation: 7,320 ft (2,230 m)
- Mouth: San Francisco Wash
  - location: Near Winona
  - coordinates: 35°14′41″N 111°25′12″W
  - elevation: 6,184 ft (1,885 m)
- Length: 34 mi (55 km)

Walnut Creek is a major stream in Coconino County, Arizona that is part of the Little Colorado River drainage basin. The creek flows about 34 miles (55 km) in a northeasterly direction from south of Flagstaff to near Winona.

== Geography ==
Walnut Creek begins in a small valley near Mormon Mountain, in the Coconino National Forest. It flows northwest along the south side of Anderson Mesa where it is impounded in two reservoirs, Upper and Lower Lake Mary, which were dammed in the early 1900s to supply water to Flagstaff, several miles to the north. Before damming, Walnut Creek was one of the only reliable streams in this arid region, flowing consistently each spring with the melting of snowpack on the Colorado Plateau. After the Upper Lake Mary Dam was constructed in 1941, Walnut Creek dried up below the Lower Lake Mary Dam due to increased water diversions. Since then, the creek has flowed only during monsoon rains or exceptionally heavy snowmelt.

The creek makes a sharp turn to the east at Fisher Point and carves the narrow, winding Walnut Canyon, a limestone gorge up to 600 feet (180 m) deep. About 10 miles (16 km) east of Flagstaff it passes through Walnut Canyon National Monument, known for its cliff dwellings constructed by the Sinagua people between 1100 and 1250 A.D. Near the end of the canyon the creek approaches Winona and crosses under Interstate 40, before flowing north to its confluence with the Rio de Flag, forming San Francisco Wash. San Francisco Wash continues east, eventually discharging into Padre Canyon Wash, in turn flowing into Diablo Wash which joins the Little Colorado River near Leupp, Arizona. The San Francisco Wash is sometimes considered the lower part of Walnut Creek, and the total length of the stream would be 55 miles (89 km) if this is included.

== See also ==
- List of rivers of Arizona
- List of tributaries of the Colorado River
