= Cliffs Ranger Station =

- U.S. National Register of Historic Places
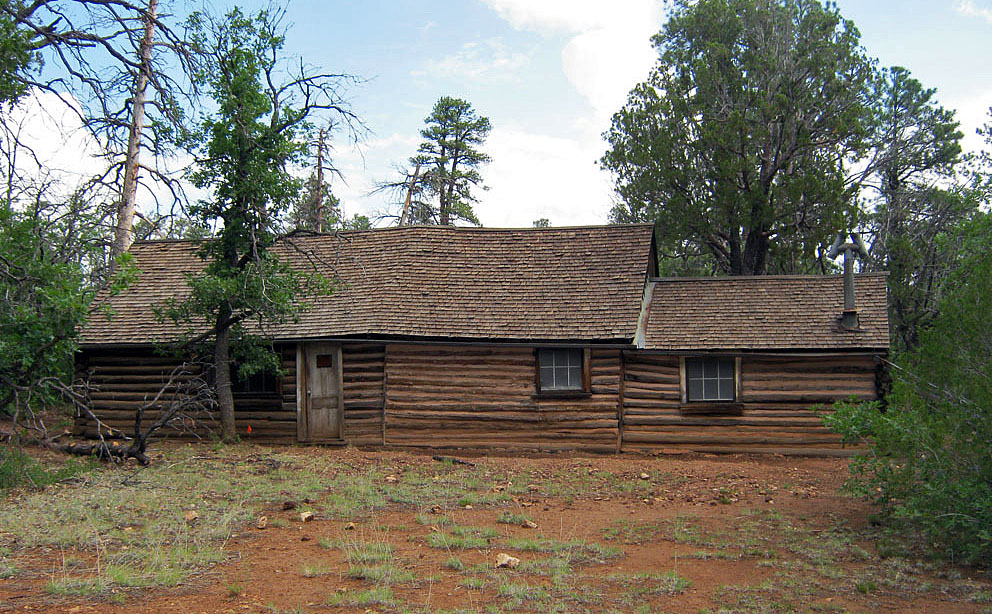

- Location within Arizona Location within the United States
- Nearest city: Flagstaff, Arizona
- Coordinates: 35°10′30″N 111°31′2″W
- Area: 3.6 acres (1.5 ha)
- Built: 1904
- Built by: United States Forest Service
- NRHP reference No.: 75000220 (original); 100004317 (increase)

Significant dates
- Added to NRHP: March 31, 1975
- Boundary increase: August 28, 2019

The Cliffs Ranger Station is an early United States Forest Service ranger station in what is now Walnut Canyon National Monument in northern Arizona, United States. Also known as the Old Headquarters of the national monument, it was built in 1904 by the Forest Service, and served as the monument headquarters after it was established in 1915. The log cabin is one of the oldest remaining log cabins in northern Arizona. It served as the living quarters for the park's early custodians. The cabin measures 45 ft (14 m) by 15 ft (4.6 m) overall, including an addition at the east end. The roof overhang of the addition has been cut back to allow an alligator cypress to grow close to the building. The interior is divided into four rooms.

The Old Headquarters was placed on the National Register of Historic Places on March 31, 1975. The listing was enlarged and renamed in 2019.
