= Lake Mary (Arizona) =

Reservoir in Arizona, United States

- Location within Arizona Location within the United States
- Location: Coconino County, Arizona
- Coordinates: 35°4′22.1″N 111°31′27.2″W
- Type: reservoir
- Primary inflows: Walnut Creek
- Primary outflows: Walnut Creek
- Basin countries: United States
- Surface area: 600 acres (240 ha)
- Average depth: 38 ft (12 m)
- Surface elevation: 6,895 ft (2,102 m)

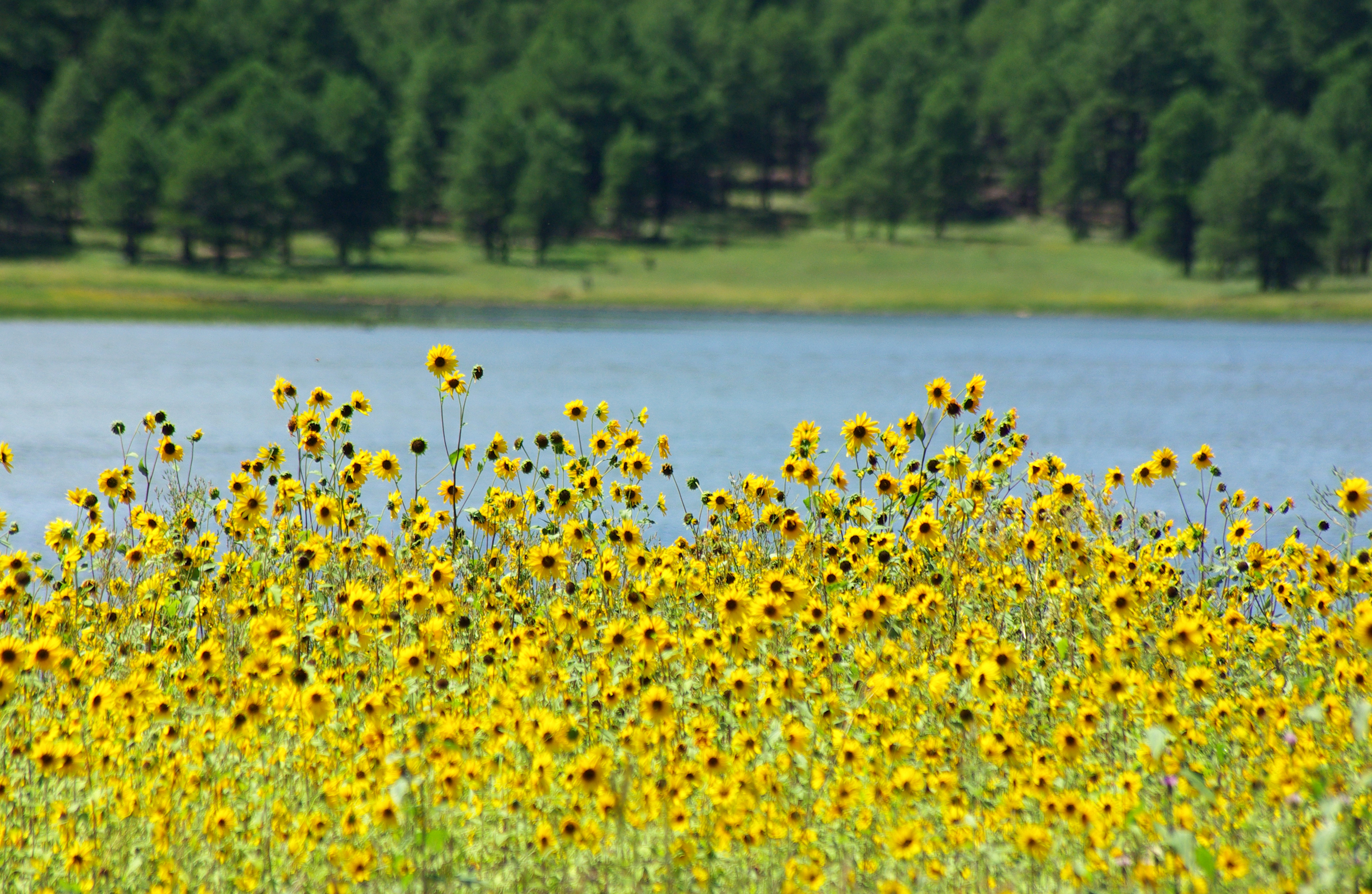
Sunflowers at Lake Mary, 2010

Lake Mary may refer to one of two reservoirs in northern Arizona southeast of Flagstaff. The name may also be used to refer to the two lakes as a whole. The pair of lakes impound the intermittent Walnut Creek upstream from Walnut Canyon. Recreational facilities at both lakes are maintained under the authority of the Coconino National Forest.

== Upper Lake Mary ==
Upper Lake Mary, the furthest upstream of the two lakes, is formed by a small earthen dam on Walnut Creek. In 1941, the city of Flagstaff built a second dam south of Lake Mary, creating Upper Lake Mary. The lake is long and narrow, with a maximum length of about 5 miles (8.0 km), and a maximum width of about 2,000 feet (610 meters). During dry seasons the lake will narrow and shorten.

Upper Lake Mary contains nine fish species for angling, including black crappie, bluegill, green sunfish, channel catfish, northern pike and walleye. Largemouth bass, yellow bass and yellow perch are sometimes reported to be found in the lake as well. Also golden shiners and fathead minnows are bait fish that are found in Upper Lake Mary.

== Lower Lake Mary ==
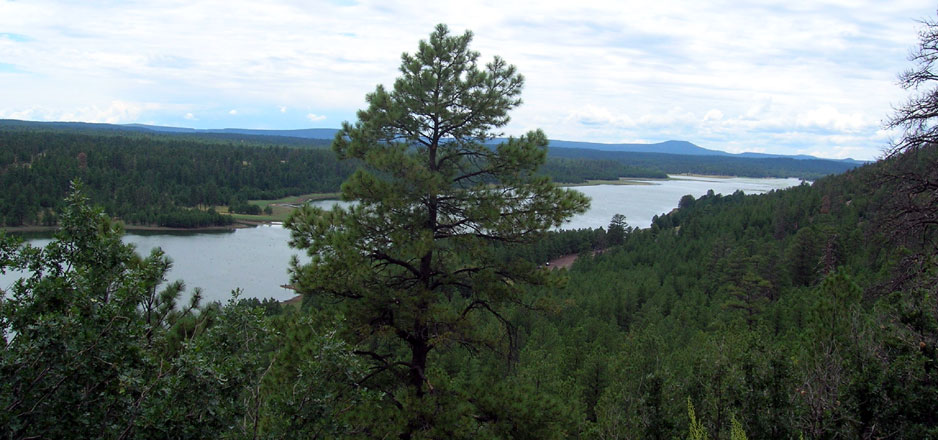
Lower Lake Mary

Lower Lake Mary, the furthest downstream of the two lakes is located directly below the upper lake. It is the smaller, and the first to be developed, of two lakes, reaching a maximum length of 3 miles (4.8 km) during wet seasons. At its maximum capacity, the lake fills the valley from the small earthen dam at its head to the foot of the dam holding back Upper Lake Mary. During dry seasons, however, the lake has a tendency to dry up completely. The lake is named after Mary Riordan, a daughter of the wealthy lumber barons who built the dam in 1904 for a water supply for Flagstaff.

Due to its tendency to dry up, the Lower Lake Mary does not have the water sports appeal of its upstream sibling. The lake is regularly stocked with rainbow trout during wet years. Any fish species that is found in Upper Lake Mary can be found as well as a result of Upper Lake Mary spilling.

Both lakes are also home to populations of elk and deer. The waters themselves attract various bird species including the great blue heron and the bald eagle. During the warmer summer months, the region becomes a popular destination for birdwatchers.

== See also ==
- Riordan Mansion State Historic Park
