= Winona, Arizona =

Populated place in Coconino County, Arizona, US

- Populated place
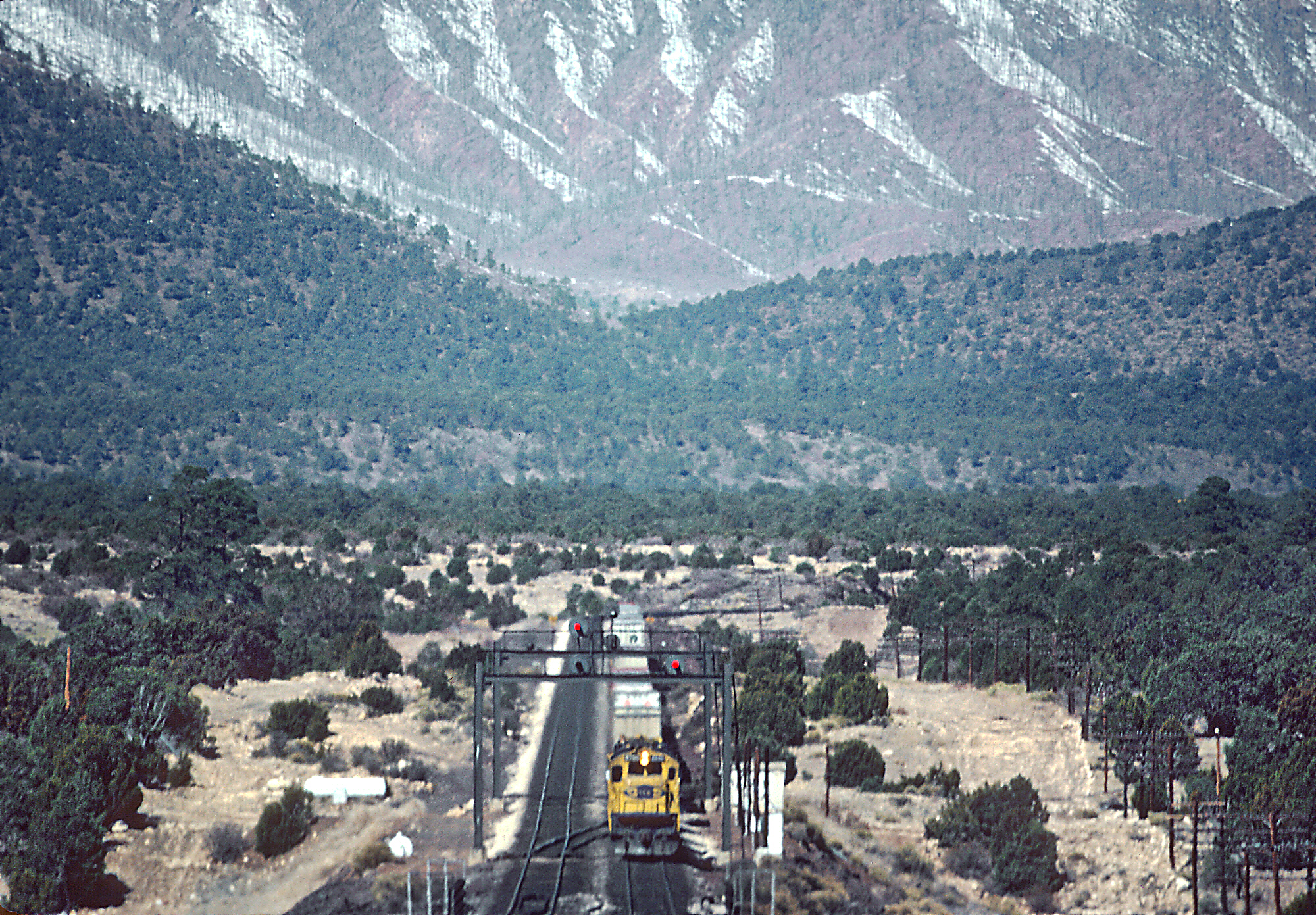
- A freight train passing through Darling

- Location in Coconino County and the state of Arizona
- Coordinates: 35°12′18″N 111°24′30″W
- Country: United States
- State: Arizona
- Counties: Coconino
- Elevation: 6,263 ft (1,909 m)
- Time zone: UTC-7 (MST)
- Area code: 928
- FIPS code: 04-83860
- GNIS feature ID: 36324

Winona is a small populated place in Coconino County in the northern part of the U.S. state of Arizona. At one time it was also called Walnut, and Winona's railroad station was renamed Darling in honor of an engineer.

== History ==
Winona was once an incorporated village called Walnut Creek, until the 1950s when it became part of Flagstaff. Walnut Creek runs through Winona. It has been a dry creek bed since a dam was built above Walnut Canyon in the 1950s to provide Flagstaff with a reservoir. Before this, the creek ran year round.

== Railroad ==
Winona train station was renamed on 6 December 1959 as "Darling" after William B. Darling, a local railroad engineer. Darling Cinder Pit to the north east of Winona is also named after him.

The history of Darling is tied directly to the railroad that crosses through it. The Southwest Chief has been a regular visitor and for many years it was served by the Santa Fe Railway.

In October 2019 a BNSF freight train derailed there, disrupting both freight traffic, intermodal freight and passenger train traffic on Amtrak.

== In popular culture ==
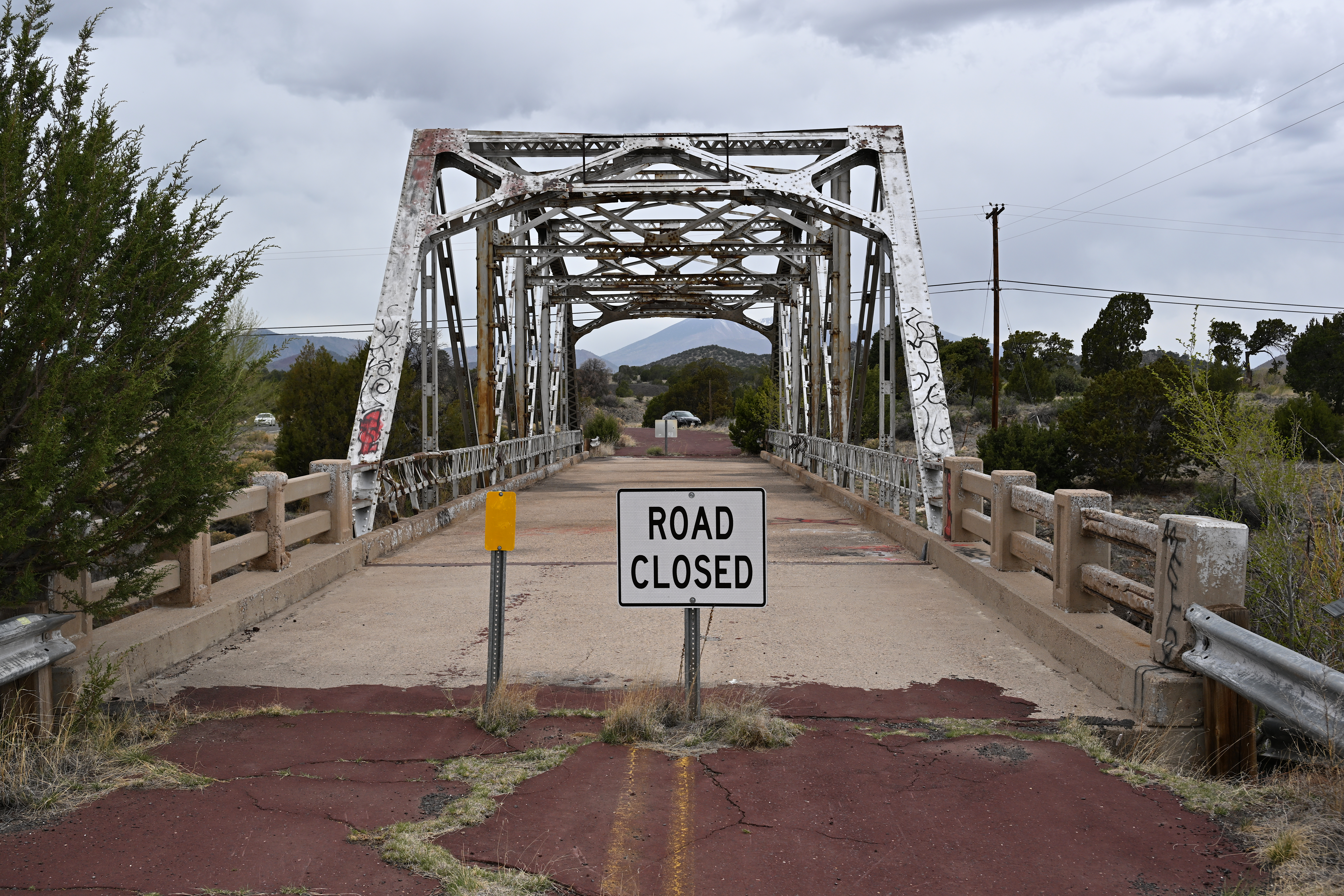
Winona Bridge, which is no longer accessible by car

Winona is located along Interstate 40 (old U.S. Route 66), and the otherwise-obscure town was made famous due to its inclusion in the lyrics to the song "(Get Your Kicks on) Route 66". It lies about thirteen miles (21 km) east of Flagstaff, meaning that it is out of sequence with the rest of the cities named in the song because of its near-miss: "Don't forget Winona."

The singer Wynonna Judd adopted her name upon hearing "Winona" in "Route 66."
