= Tappan Spring =

Spring in Tappan Spring Canyon, Coconino County, Arizona

Coordinates: 35.8581809°N 111.4433239°W

Tappan Spring is a spring located in Tappan Spring Canyon in Coconino County, Arizona. Basalt rocks of Tappan age are named after flows from cinder cones north of the spring. Tappan-age rocks are from the period 0.2 to 0.7 myr.
