= Picture Canyon Natural and Cultural Preserve =

- Picture Canyon Archeological Site
- U.S. National Register of Historic Places
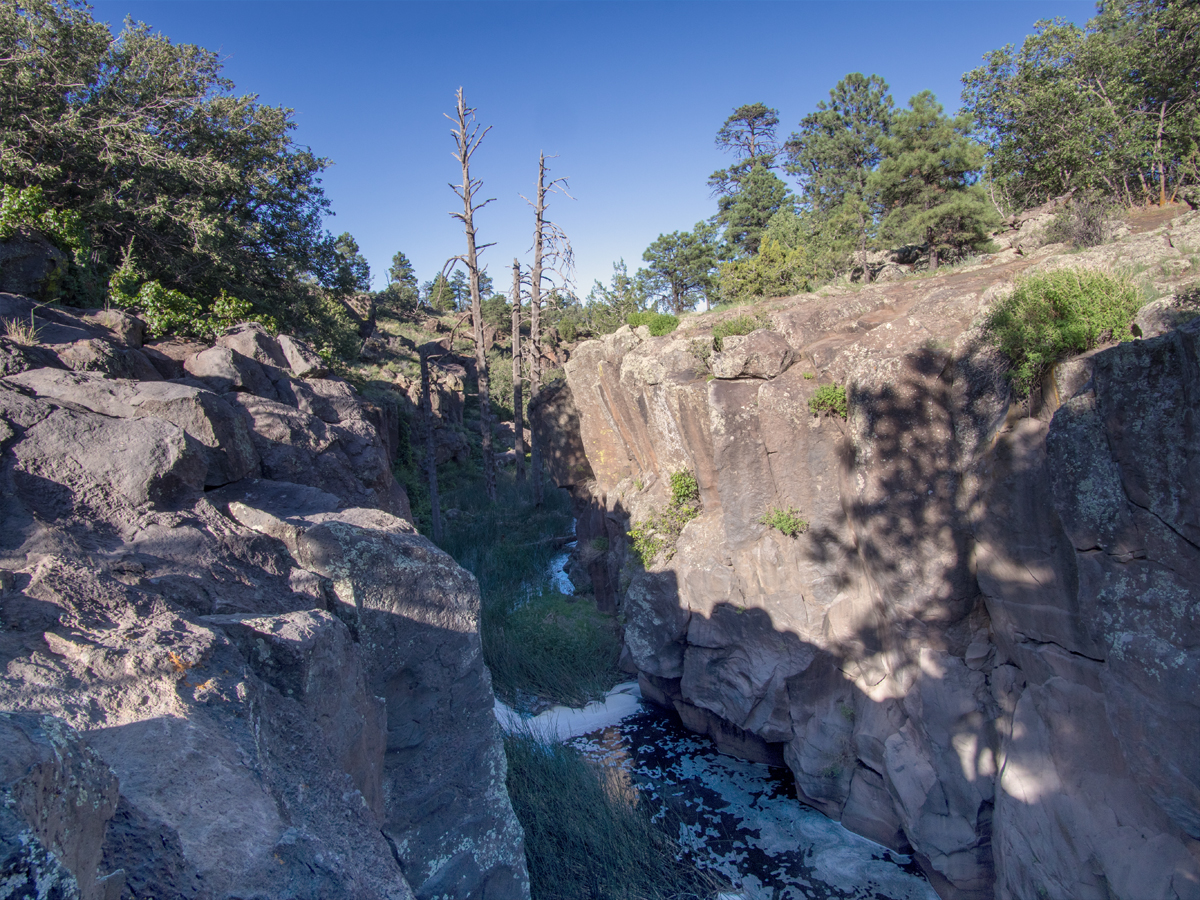

- Location within Arizona
- Location: El Paso Flagstaff Road, Flagstaff, Arizona
- Coordinates: 35.22903°N 111.55347°W
- Area: 30 acres (12 ha)
- NRHP reference No.: 07001349
- Added to NRHP: January 10, 2008

The Picture Canyon Natural and Cultural Preserve is an archaeological site and a nature preserve open to the public year-round, located in northeast Flagstaff, Arizona. The preserve is used for educating the community about ecology, geology and archaeology along with general outdoor recreation.

History

Picture Canyon was listed on the National Register of Historic Places on January 10, 2008. The 478-acre preserve was purchased October 30, 2012 at a public auction on the steps of Coconino County Courthouse from the State Land Department by the City of Flagstaff for $4.8 million after several community groups rehabilitated the area and rallied decades for its protection. An agreement was made with the Wildcat Hill Wastewater Treatment Plant, located immediately south of the preserve, to provide a constant water source for the riparian habitat and wildlife. Reclaimed water is discharged into a pond which feeds the Rio de Flag through a rugged geological canyon composed of basalt rock. Thousands of years ago, between 700 and 1300 AD, this area was home to the natives known as the Northern Sinagua (people without water). Picture Canyon is named for the large density of petroglyphs created by the Sinagua located along the river. Hundreds of panels were created depicting archers, geometric shapes, and local animals like birds and turtles.

Trails and Natural Features

There are three trails within the preserve:

- Tom Moody Trail is a 2.8-mile outer loop within the preserve. An outdoor classroom with educational panels is located near the start of the trail. The southeast section of the trail initially runs parallel with the Rio De Flag and along the canyon walls where a visitor can view the waterfall within the preserve. Continuing northeast, after crossing the Rio De Flag Bridge, will bring a visitor to a waterbird petroglyph site.
- Don Weaver Trail is a 0.7-mile section connecting with the Tom Moody Trail to create a smaller loop and brings a visitor to the opposite side of the canyon walls for another view of the waterfall.
- Arizona Trail is a 1.5-mile section of the larger 800+ mile trail that spans from Mexico to Utah, and bisects the Tom Moody Trail.

== Gallery ==
Picture Canyon, National Register of Historic Places

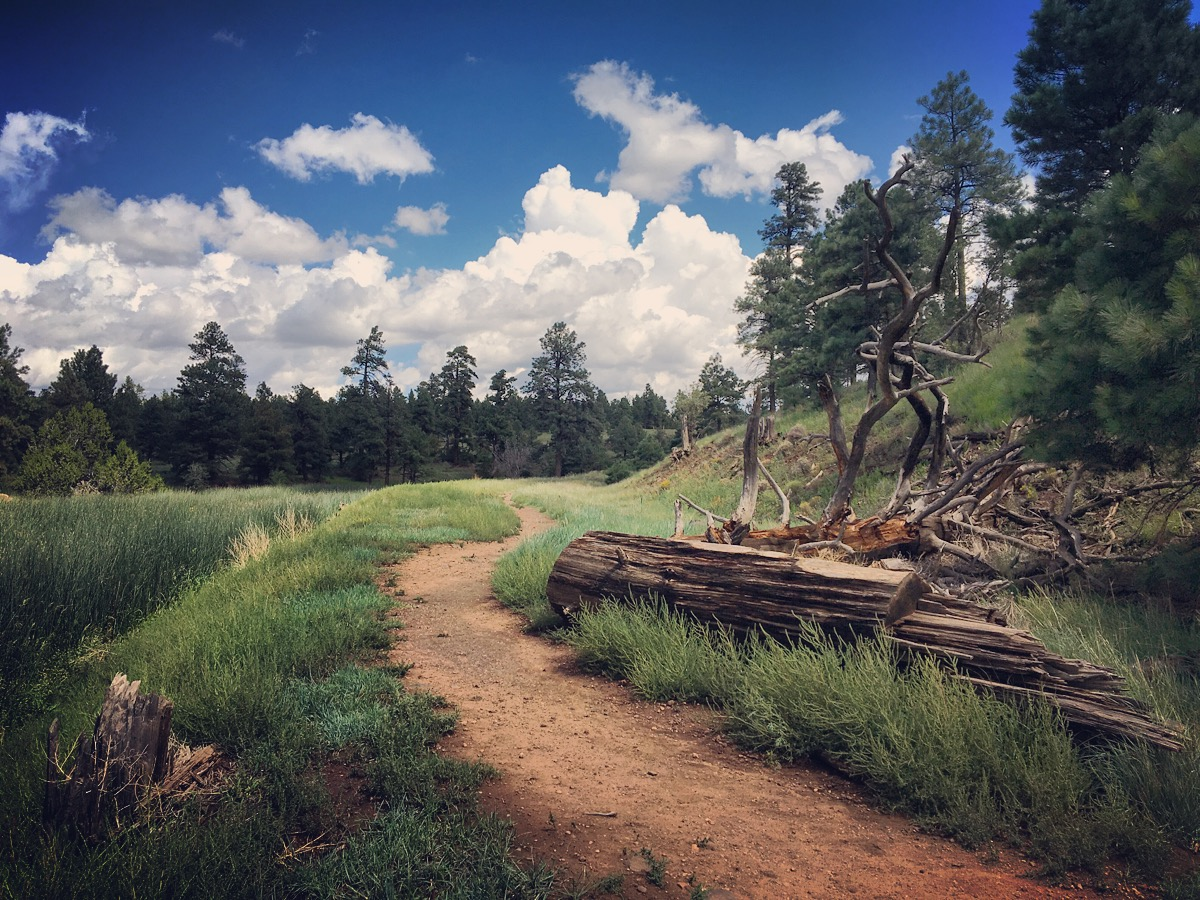
Tom Moody Trail

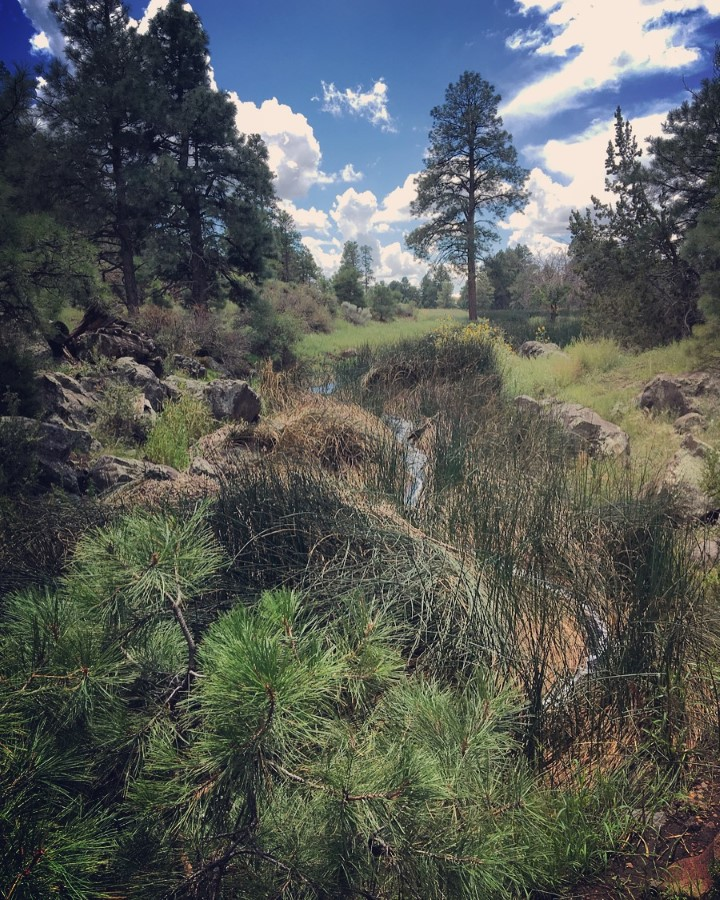
Don Weaver Trail

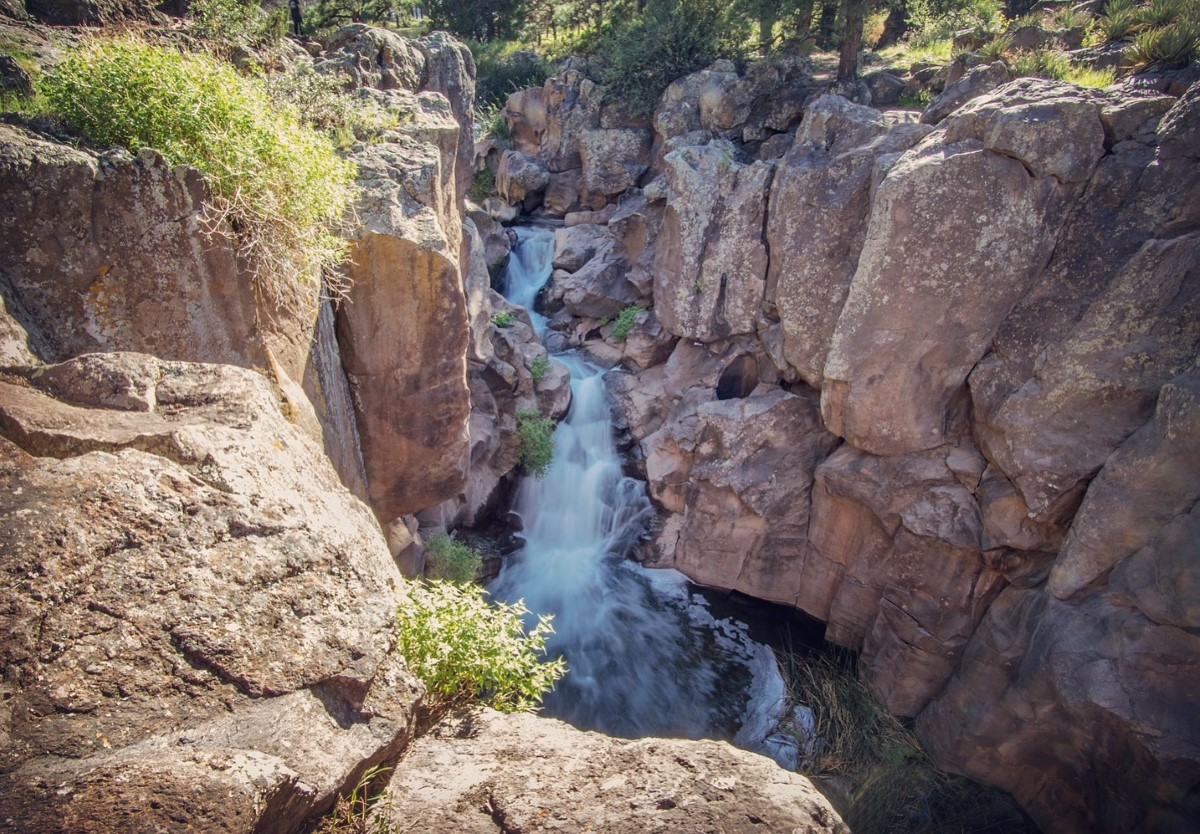
Waterfall - view from Tom Moody Trail

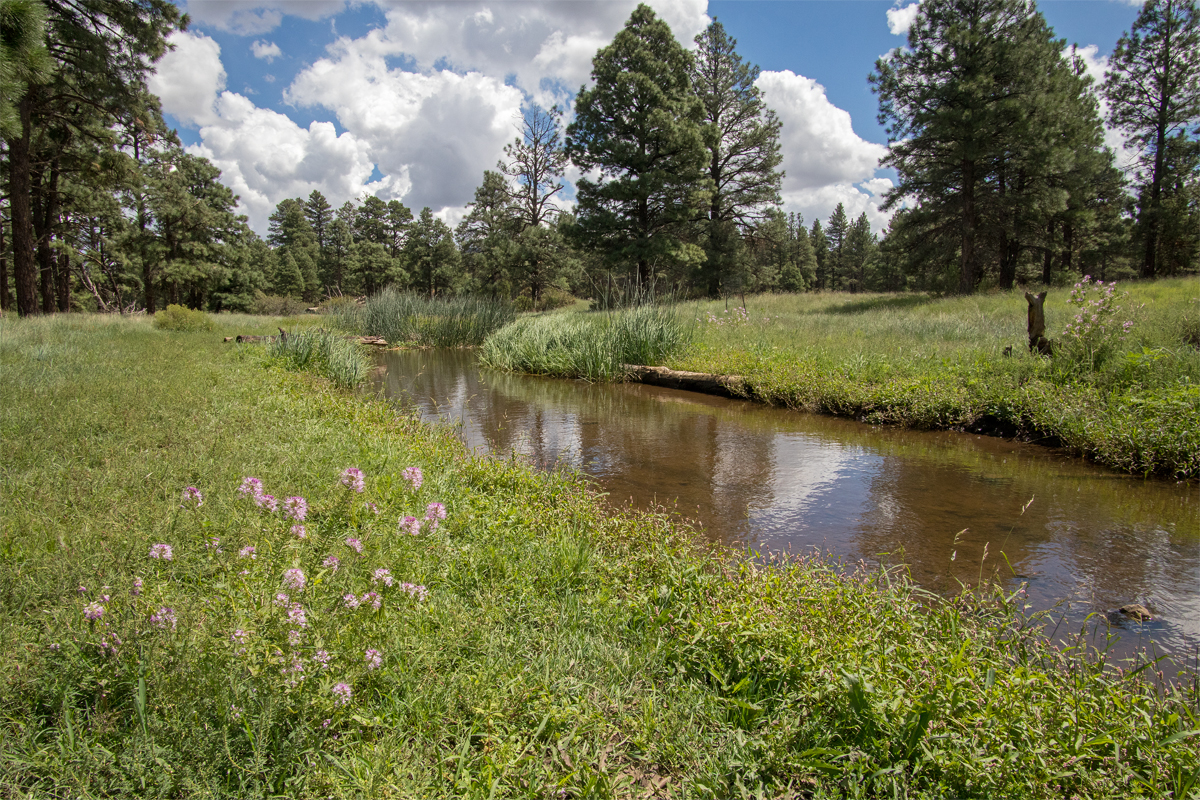
Meadow at the Rio De Flag bridge.
