= Walnut Canyon National Monument =

Protected area in Coconino County, Arizona

- IUCN category III (natural monument or feature)
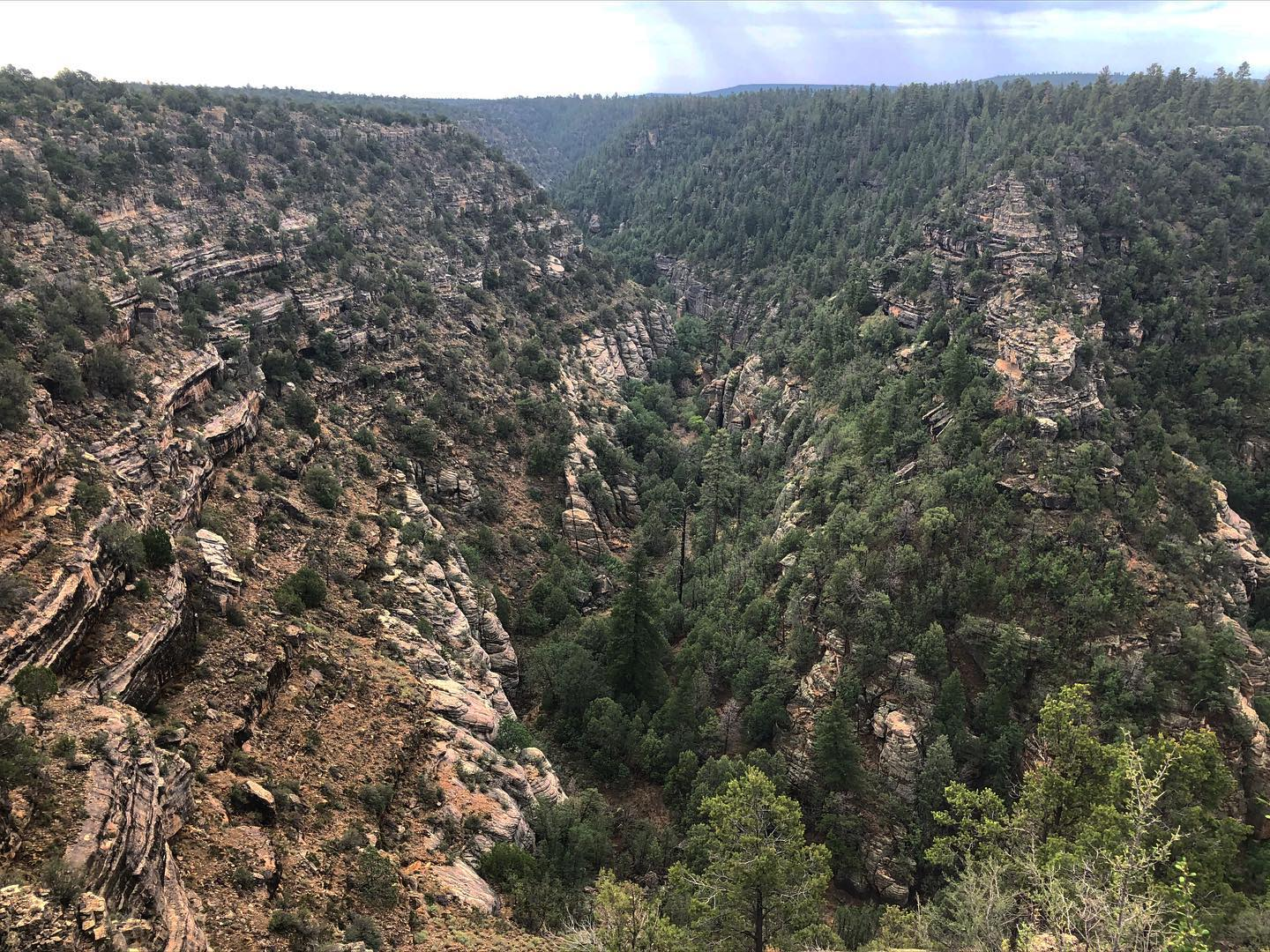
- Location: Coconino County, Arizona, United States
- Nearest city: Flagstaff, Arizona
- Coordinates: 35°09′57″N 111°30′07″W
- Area: 3,529 acres (14.28 km^{2})
- Created: November 30, 1915
- Visitors: 153,317 (in 2025)
- Governing body: National Park Service
- Website: Walnut Canyon National Monument
- Walnut Canyon National Monument
- U.S. National Register of Historic Places
- U.S. Historic district
- Nearest city: Flagstaff, Arizona
- Area: 2,249.5 acres (910.3 ha)
- NRHP reference No.: 66000174
- Added to NRHP: October 15, 1966

Walnut Canyon National Monument (Hopi: Wupatupqa) is a United States National Monument located about 10 mi (16 km) southeast of downtown Flagstaff, Arizona, near Interstate 40. The canyon rim elevation is 6,690 ft (2,040 m); the canyon's floor is 350 ft (110 m) lower. A 0.9 mi (1.4 km) long loop trail descends 185 ft (56 m) into the canyon passing 25 cliff dwelling rooms constructed by the Sinagua, a pre-Columbian cultural group that lived in Walnut Canyon from about 1100 to 1250 AD. Other contemporary habitations of the Sinagua people are preserved in the nearby Tuzigoot and Montezuma Castle national monuments.

== History ==
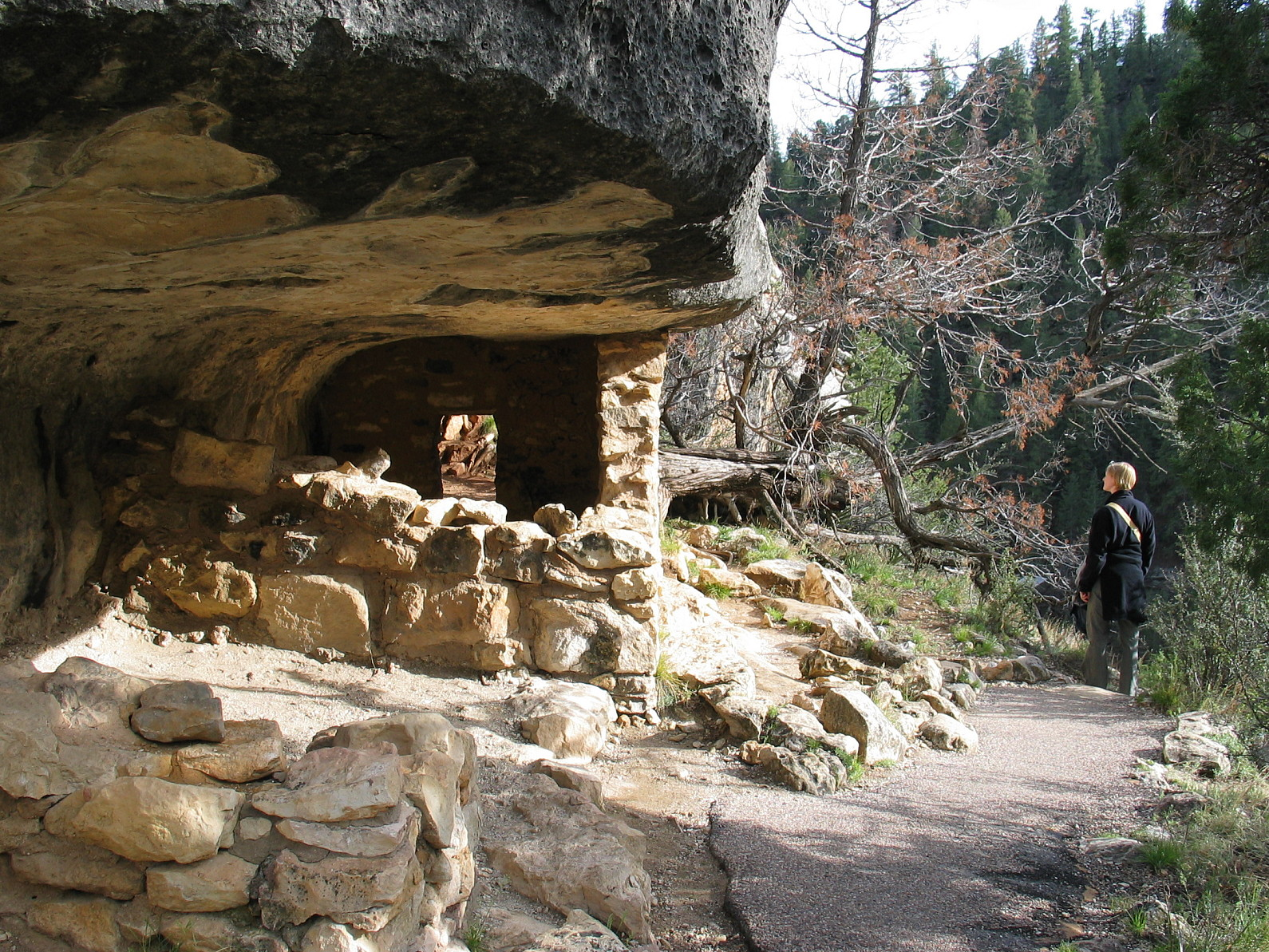
Cliff dwellings in Walnut Canyon

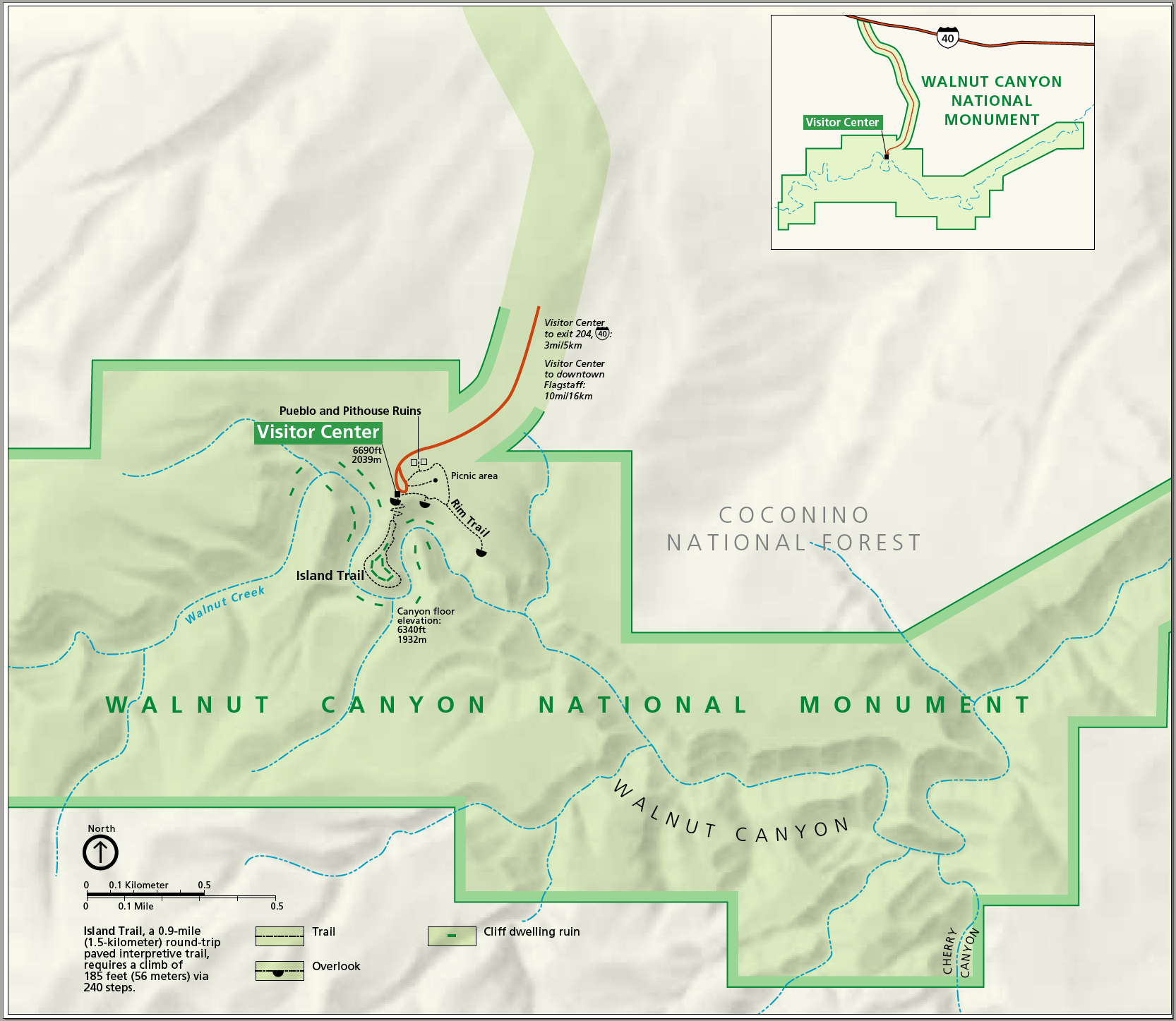
Click for larger version of map

Sinagua is Spanish for "without water", an acknowledgement that the Sinagua people were able to live in such a dry region. By living in such a region the Sinagua became experts at conserving water and dealing with droughts. The Sinagua were also believed to have been active traders whose activities and influence stretched to the Gulf of Mexico and even as far as Central America. The Sinagua, who inhabited the dwellings in Walnut Canyon, left mysteriously around 1250 AD. It is thought that the Sinagua left because of fear of neighboring tribes or droughts, but it is not certain. The Sinagua left over 80 cliff dwellings behind. The Sinagua built their homes under limestone ledges, deep within the canyon, some time between 1125 and 1250 – taking advantage of the natural recesses in the limestone cliff walls which were eroded over millions of years by flowing water. The dwellings themselves were small, but large enough for the inhabitants to cook and sleep. Most of the cliff dwelling rooms are situated near the loop trail, typically slightly above the trail and immediately outside the loop itself. A typical room might have been the dwelling of a single family, and might measure approximately two meters high by six meters long by three meters deep. Because of the area's dry climate, the water present in the canyon was essential for its inhabitants over 700 years ago as it is for animal and plant life today. The plant life is very diverse in Walnut Canyon, with more than 387 different plant species, including the Prickly Pear cactus and the Arizona Black Walnut. The biodiversity of the area includes high concentrations of sensitive plant species that probably contributed to the decision made by prehistoric people to settle in the area.

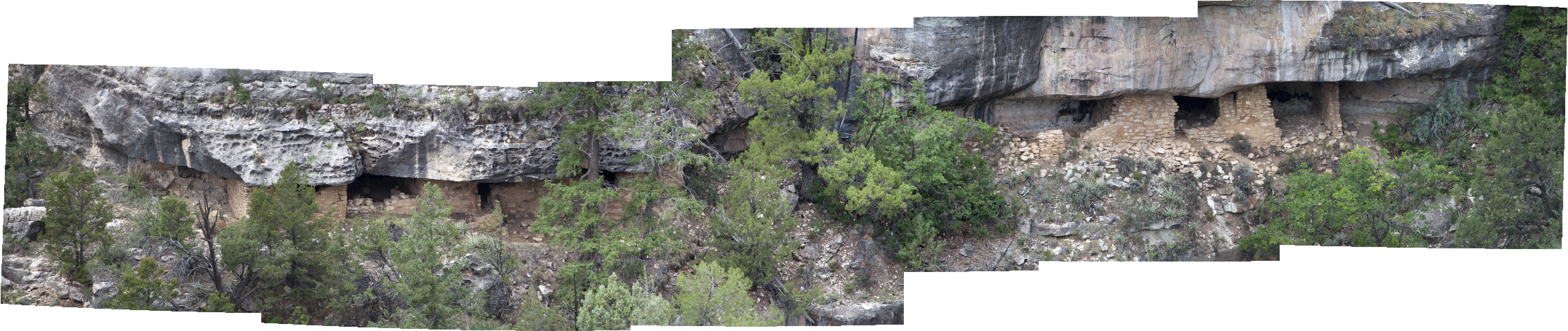
Panorama of the southern cliff dwellings which are inaccessible to visitors

There are other ruins in the 20-by-10-mile (32 by 16 km) area, but none are publicly accessible. Many more dwellings can be seen up close in the canyon just east of the Monument, although it is illegal to enter the canyon.

Walnut Canyon was proclaimed a national monument on November 30, 1915, by President Woodrow Wilson to preserve the ancient cliff dwellings. It was transferred from the USDA Forest Service to the National Park Service on August 10, 1933. As with all historic areas administered by the National Park Service, the national monument was listed on the National Register of Historic Places on October 15, 1966. At Walnut Canyon, there are trails for tourists to get a close view of the dwellings.

In 2016, Walnut Canyon National Monument, along with Sunset Crater Volcano National Monument and Wupatki National Monument, was designated an International Dark Sky Park by DarkSky International, in recognition of the quality of the star-filled night sky and commitment to reducing light pollution.

== Geology ==
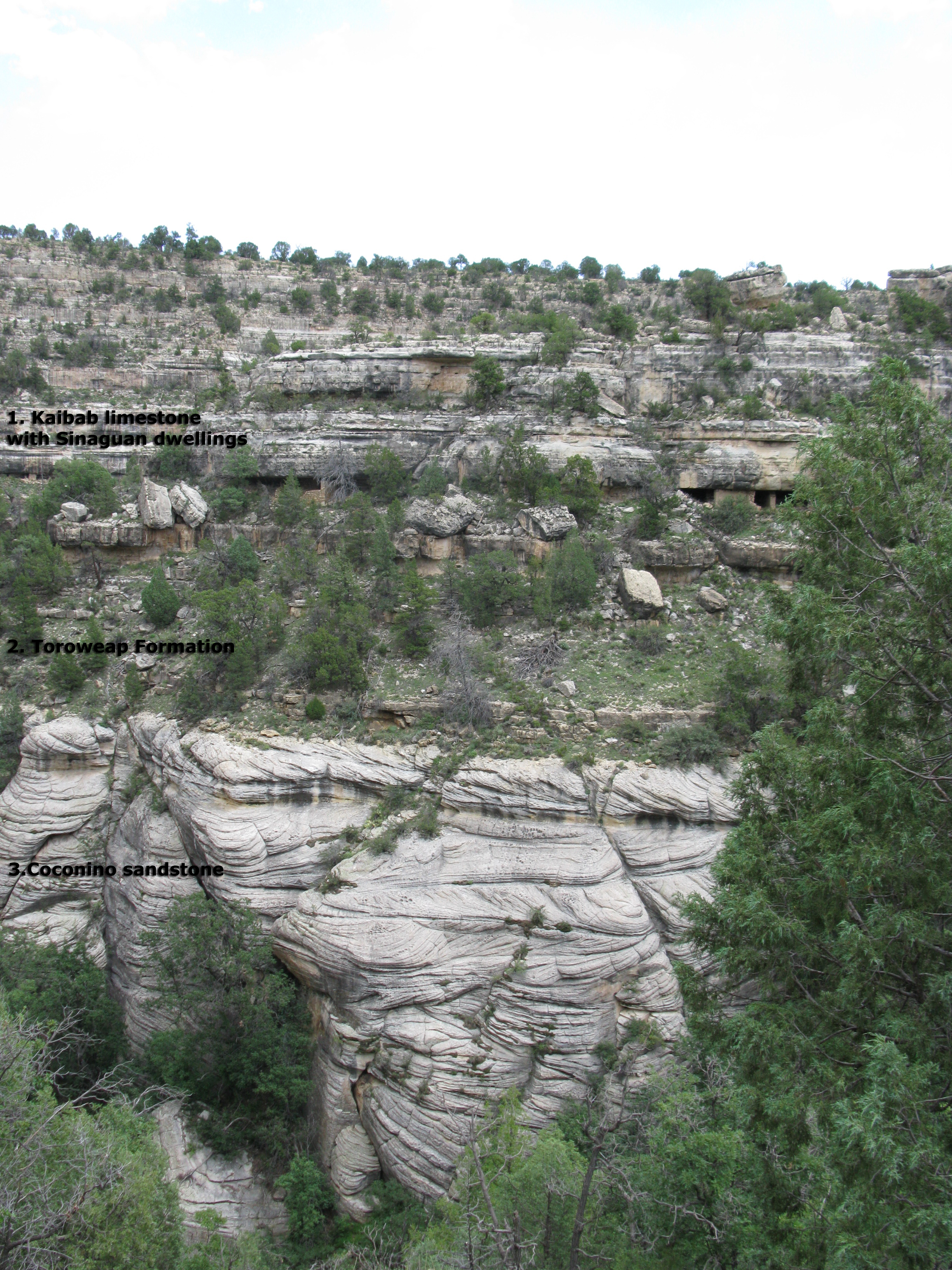
Geological strata: Kaibab Limestone, Toroweap Formation, and Coconino Sandstone

Walnut Canyon lies on the Colorado Plateau and cuts through the Permian Kaibab Limestone, which exposes the Toroweap Formation and Coconino Sandstone. The Kaibab formation also forms the rim of the Grand Canyon. Crossbedding is present in the Coconino Sandstone.

The Walnut Canyon site contains Walnut Creek, which carved a 600-foot-deep (180 m) canyon that flows east. The creek joins into the Little Colorado River en route to the Grand Canyon. The creek has also created a varied and abundant array of vegetation. The shaded, north-facing walls are covered in fir and ponderosa pine trees. The sunny, south facing slopes have agaves and several species of cactus including opuntia, echinocereus and cholla. The floor of the canyon is home to several species of walnut trees, for which the canyon is named.

The rocks in the canyon walls are formed of three distinct layers – the upper third of Walnut Canyon's walls contain Kaibab Limestone that varies in layers and hardness, where the cliff dwellings are found, which overlies steep, scrub covered slopes of the Toroweap Formation, while the lowest third is the sheer-walled, cross-bedded Coconino Sandstone. Many layers of the limestone eroded, creating alcoves that the Sinagua Indians used as cave-dwellings.

Today a variety of archeological and natural resources are preserved on approximately 3600 acres.

== Climate ==
Not all of Arizona is warm dry desert. At 6,690 feet (2,039.1 m) above sea level, Walnut Canyon has snow in winter, hot sun in summer with afternoon thunderstorms, and in the spring, strong gusty winds on the rim and/or in the canyon. Even though the climate was and still is somewhat harsh, the Sinagua Indians that lived there were able to harvest maize, beans and squash.

Climate data for Walnut Canyon National Monument, Arizona, 1991–2020 normals, extremes 1910–present
Month	Jan	Feb	Mar	Apr	May	Jun	Jul	Aug	Sep	Oct	Nov	Dec	Year
Record high °F (°C)	70 (21)	69 (21)	79 (26)	84 (29)	92 (33)	100 (38)	102 (39)	98 (37)	96 (36)	88 (31)	78 (26)	69 (21)	102 (39)
Mean maximum °F (°C)	58.4 (14.7)	62.2 (16.8)	69.8 (21.0)	76.4 (24.7)	84.9 (29.4)	93.7 (34.3)	95.8 (35.4)	90.9 (32.7)	87.9 (31.1)	79.9 (26.6)	69.4 (20.8)	61.4 (16.3)	97.0 (36.1)
Mean daily maximum °F (°C)	44.7 (7.1)	48.7 (9.3)	56.1 (13.4)	61.8 (16.6)	71.0 (21.7)	82.1 (27.8)	85.9 (29.9)	82.3 (27.9)	77.6 (25.3)	67.4 (19.7)	54.8 (12.7)	44.6 (7.0)	64.7 (18.2)
Daily mean °F (°C)	32.5 (0.3)	35.8 (2.1)	42.3 (5.7)	47.8 (8.8)	55.6 (13.1)	66.4 (19.1)	71.5 (21.9)	68.7 (20.4)	62.0 (16.7)	50.9 (10.5)	41.3 (5.2)	32.7 (0.4)	50.6 (10.4)
Mean daily minimum °F (°C)	20.3 (−6.5)	22.8 (−5.1)	28.4 (−2.0)	33.8 (1.0)	40.3 (4.6)	50.8 (10.4)	57.0 (13.9)	55.1 (12.8)	46.4 (8.0)	34.5 (1.4)	27.8 (−2.3)	20.8 (−6.2)	36.5 (2.5)
Mean minimum °F (°C)	5.3 (−14.8)	7.5 (−13.6)	14.2 (−9.9)	22.1 (−5.5)	27.8 (−2.3)	37.5 (3.1)	47.6 (8.7)	46.1 (7.8)	34.6 (1.4)	24.6 (−4.1)	13.1 (−10.5)	4.6 (−15.2)	0.5 (−17.5)
Record low °F (°C)	−11 (−24)	−3 (−19)	1 (−17)	17 (−8)	22 (−6)	30 (−1)	38 (3)	40 (4)	29 (−2)	11 (−12)	3 (−16)	−8 (−22)	−11 (−24)
Average precipitation inches (mm)	1.27 (32)	1.73 (44)	1.50 (38)	0.85 (22)	0.59 (15)	0.26 (6.6)	2.55 (65)	3.39 (86)	1.61 (41)	1.19 (30)	1.37 (35)	1.23 (31)	17.54 (445.6)
Average snowfall inches (cm)	13.3 (34)	11.0 (28)	7.9 (20)	5.5 (14)	0.3 (0.76)	0.0 (0.0)	0.0 (0.0)	0.0 (0.0)	0.0 (0.0)	1.1 (2.8)	3.5 (8.9)	9.8 (25)	52.4 (133.46)
Average precipitation days (≥ 0.01 in)	5.6	5.7	4.8	4.0	3.8	2.2	11.3	13.1	6.9	5.1	4.1	5.4	72.0
Average snowy days (≥ 0.1 in)	3.5	4.1	2.8	1.7	0.2	0.0	0.0	0.0	0.0	0.5	1.7	3.8	18.3
Source 1: NOAA
Source 2: National Weather Service

== Operating hours and seasons ==
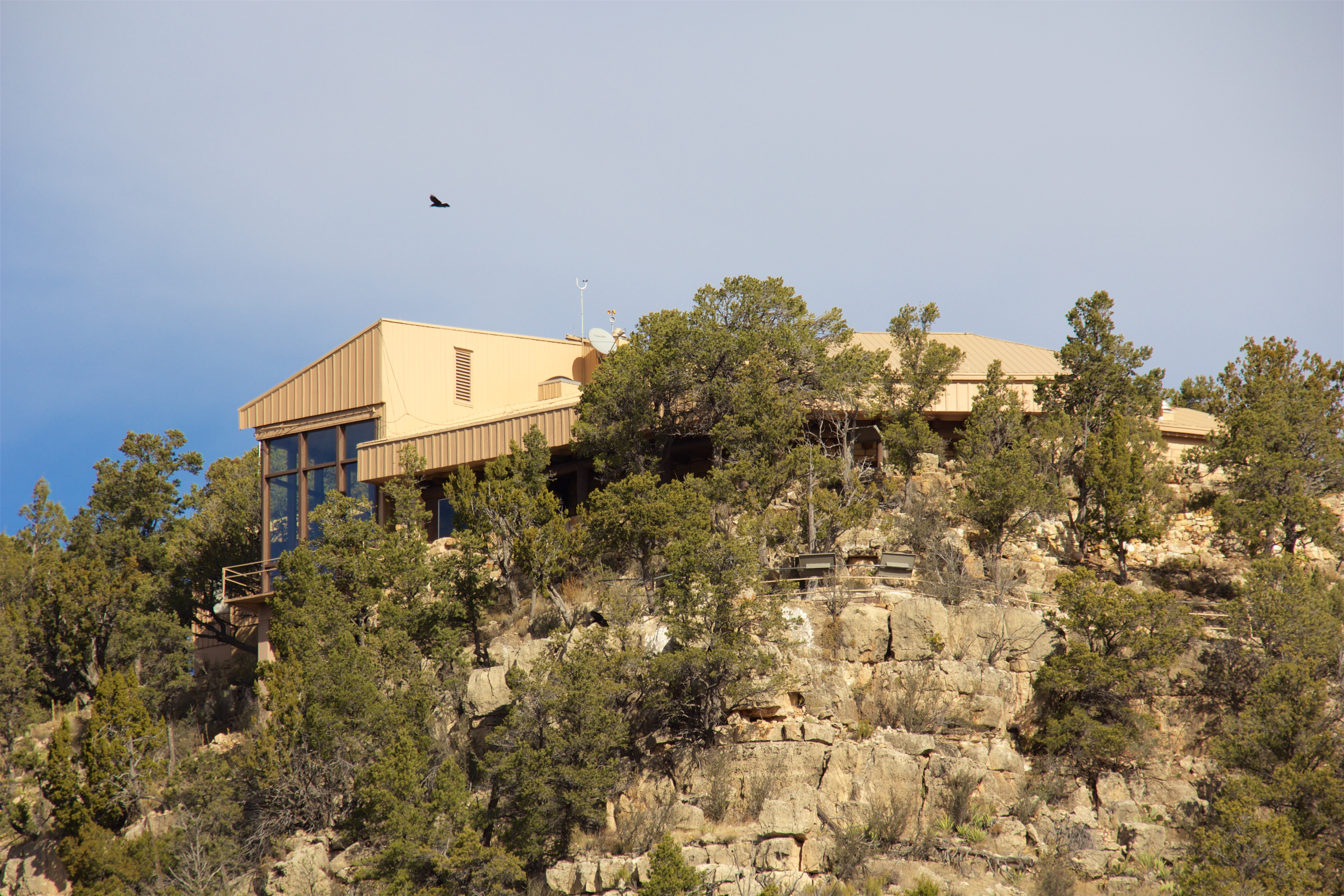
The Visitor Center

Park entrance road, trails, and Visitor Center are open all year, except December 25. The park is open from 9:00 am to 5:00 pm MST. Entry to the Island trail closes at 4 pm. Visitors are encouraged to arrive early to allow for 45–60 minutes to complete the trail. Access to the Rim trail ends at 4:30 pm. All visitors are asked to be in their vehicles and out of the park by 5:00 pm. Gates and all access to the monument are unavailable from 5:00pm to 9:00 am daily.

The Walnut Canyon site is near Flagstaff. It is 7 miles east of I-40 and 3 miles south of exit 204. The park has a museum and a small visitor center atop a cliff. Many of the ancient dwellings were built around a U-shaped meander in the canyon, where the creek circles around three sides of a high rocky plateau, almost creating an 'island', and this region now forms the central attraction of the national monument. There are other ruins in the surround area which are not open to the public. Other dwellings of the Sinagua people can be found in the nearby Tuzigoot and Montezuma Castle monuments.

The Old Headquarters is listed on the National Register of Historic Places.

== See also ==
- List of national monuments of the United States
