= Antoine Leroux =

American explorer and mountain man (1801–1861)

Joaquin Antoine Leroux, aka Watkins Leroux (1801–1861), was a 19th century mountain man and trail guide based in New Mexico. Leroux was a member of the convention that organized New Mexico Territory.

== Biography ==
In 1846, Leroux served as the guide for the Mormon Battalion under Philip St. George Cooke along with Pauline Weaver and Jean Baptiste Charbonneau. Cooke was directed to take his religiously segregated troops to California to assist in the Mexican–American War.

In 1849, Leroux served under Lieutenant J.H. Whitesley in a punitive campaign against the Ute Indians. That same year he played an important role in the aftermath of the White Massacre. In 1851, Leroux guided the Lorenzo Sitgreaves expedition through Arizona, advising them to explore the Little Colorado River valley, where the party came across the Wupatki ruins built by prehistoric Indians.

By 1853, Leroux had become a wealthy sheep rancher and landowner, but was still open to trailblazing requests (albeit with personal valet). He would participate in two expeditions that year to help survey proposed routes for the proposed Transcontinental Railroad. In summer, he accompanied Amiel Weeks Whipple on an expedition at the 35th parallel. When returning from the Whipple expedition in 1854, Leroux recorded in his journal an archaeological site in the Verde Valley.

Later that same year, he was recruited at Taos by John W. Gunnison, surveying a central route (between the 38th and 39th parallels), after Gunnison's party became bogged down in the San Juan River valley. Gunnison, however, quarrelled constantly with Leroux's advice, often to the detriment of the party in terms of terrain or favorable campsites, and Leroux eventually quit the expedition. Two days later, most of the party, including Gunnison, was slaughtered when they unexpectedly came upon a group of Paiute Indians.

== Legacy ==
Named for Leroux are:

- Antoine Leroux, New Mexico
- Leroux Springs in the San Francisco Peaks, for many years the primary water supply for Flagstaff, Arizona
- Leroux Wash, Arizona
- Antoine Leroux Land Grant
