= Flagstaff, Arizona =

City in Arizona, United States

Flagstaff
- City
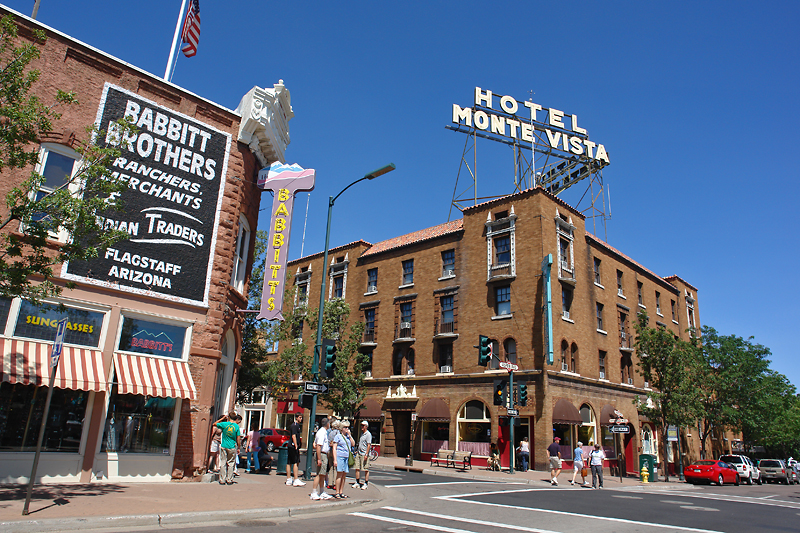
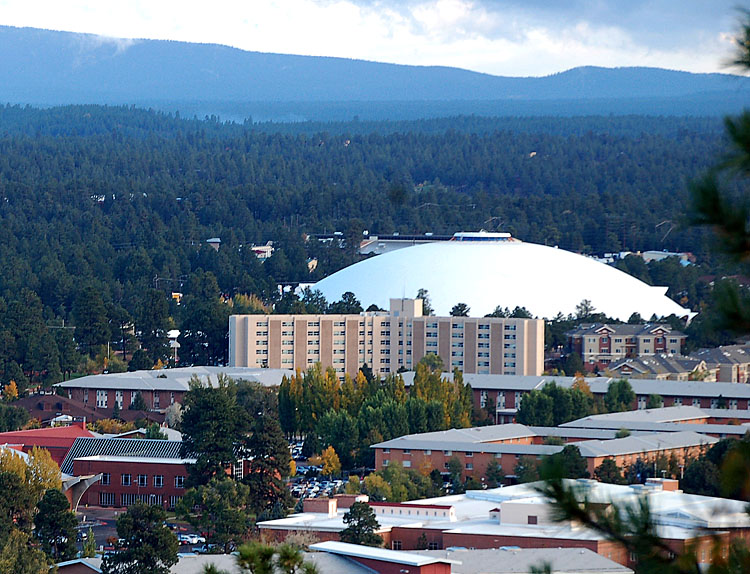
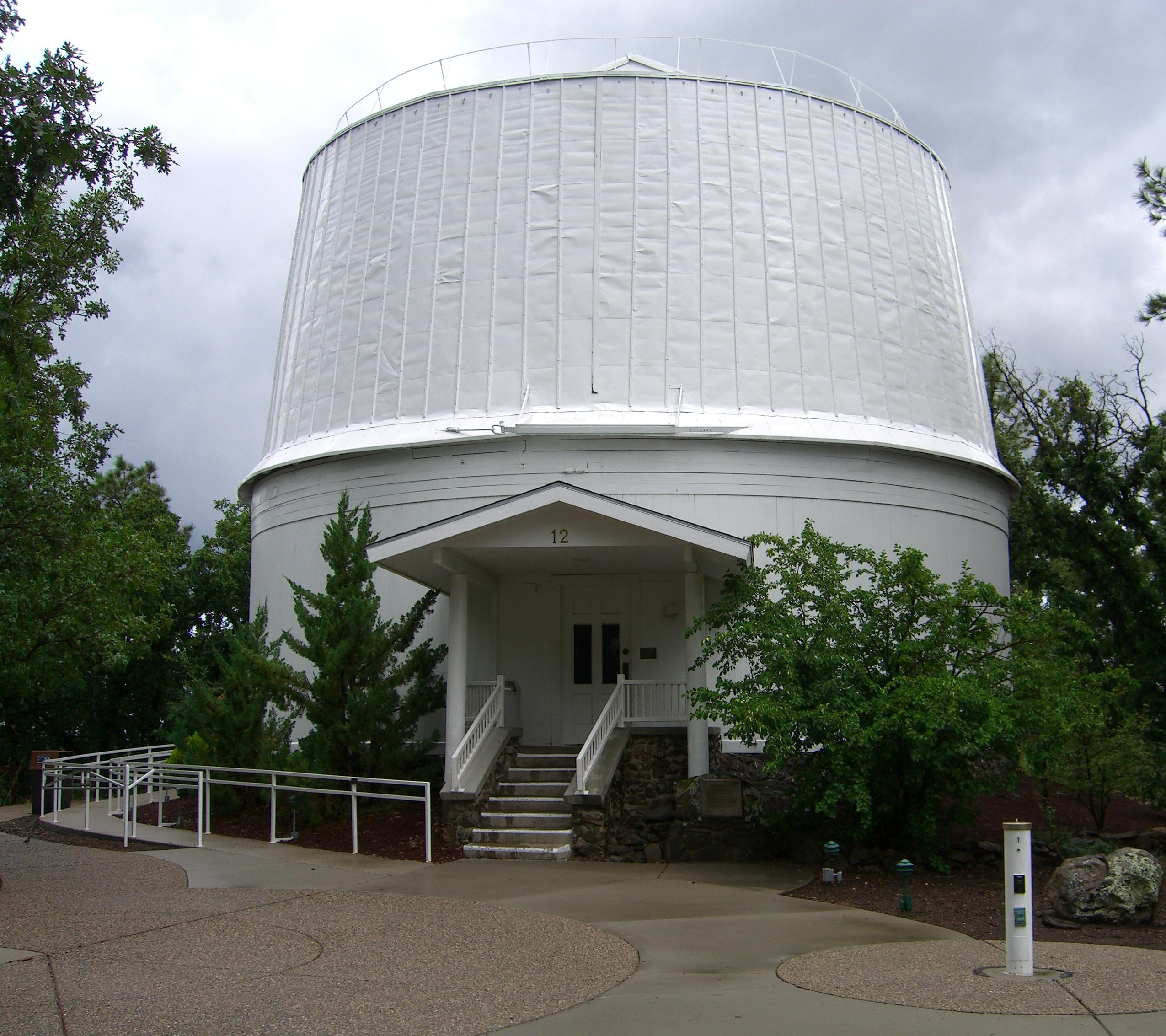
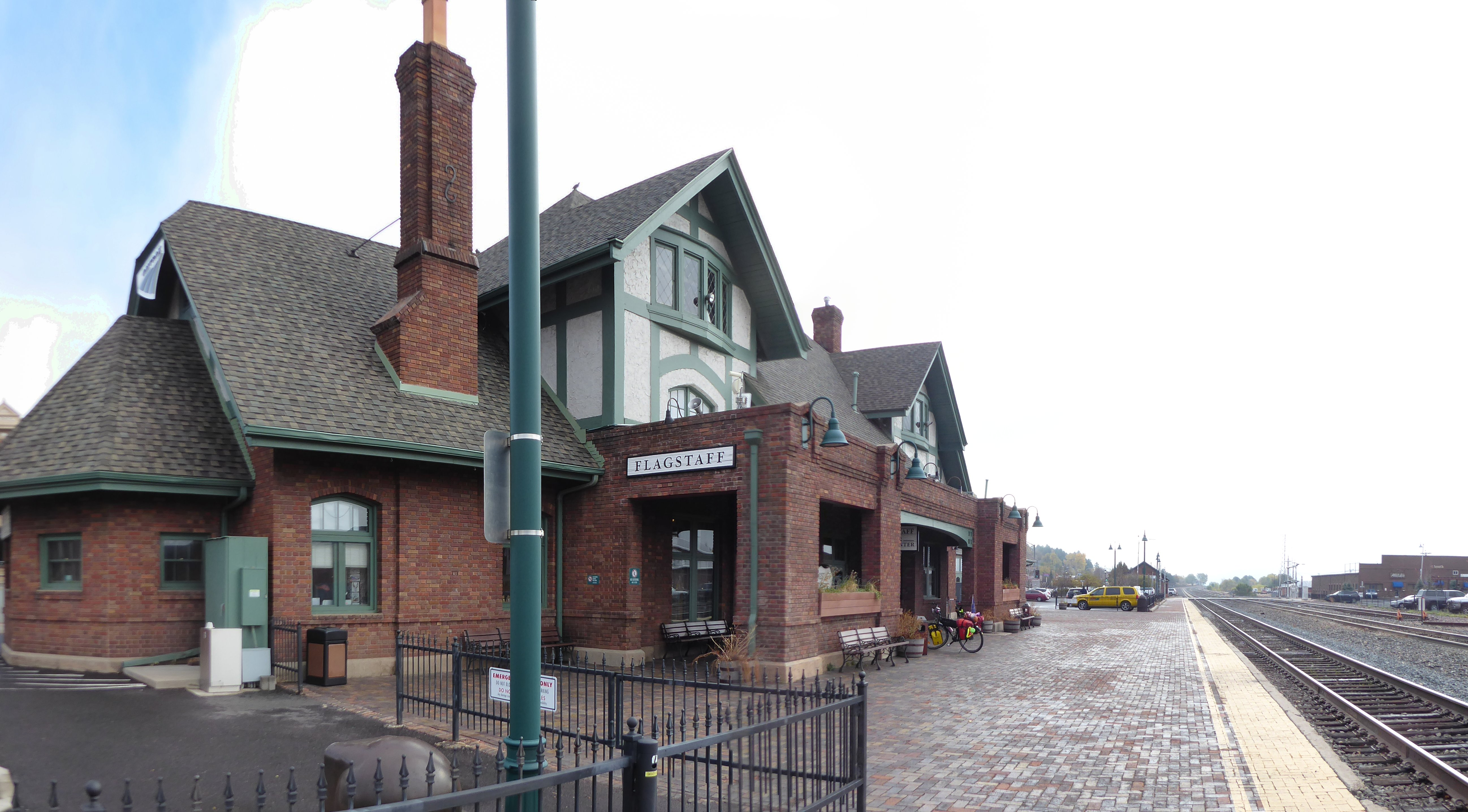
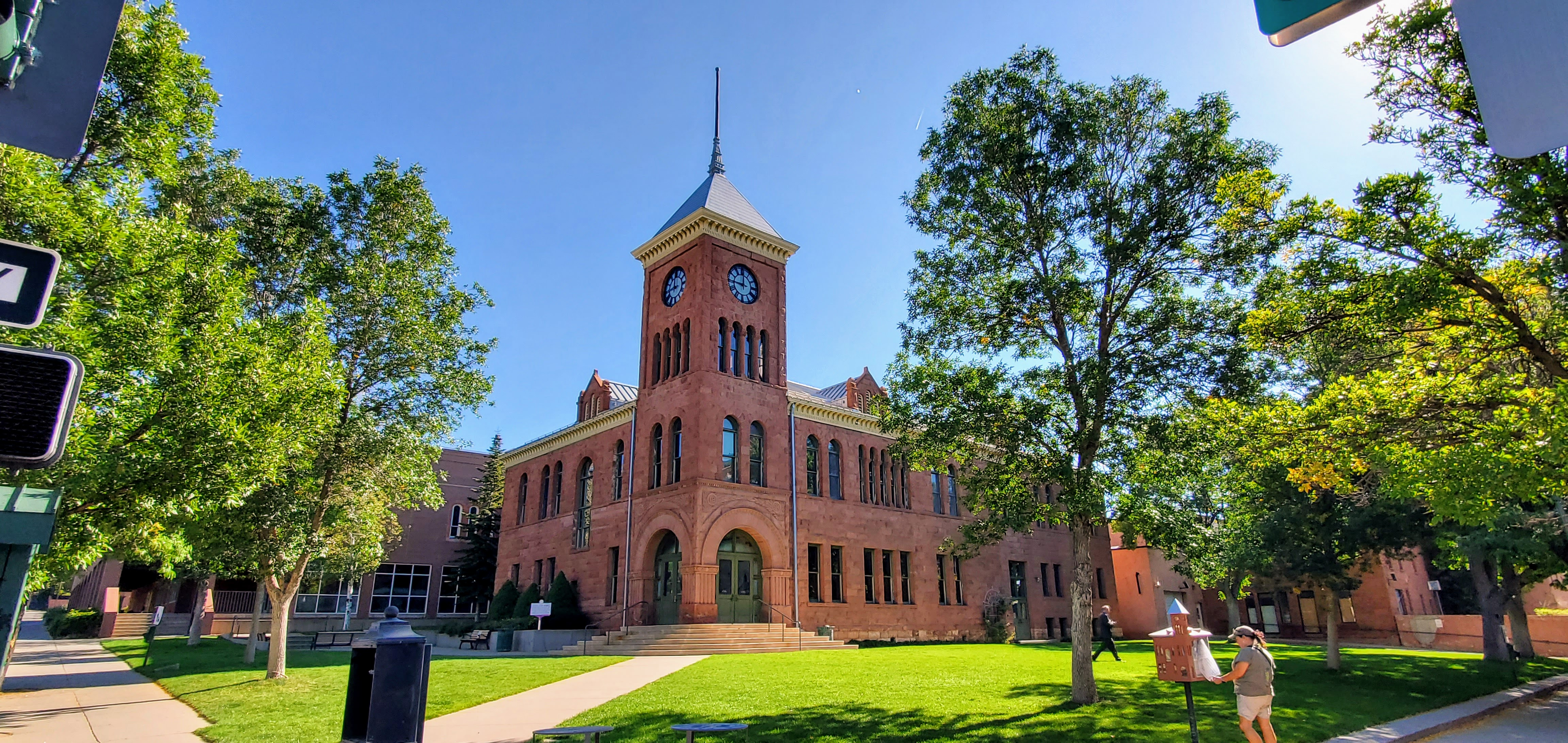
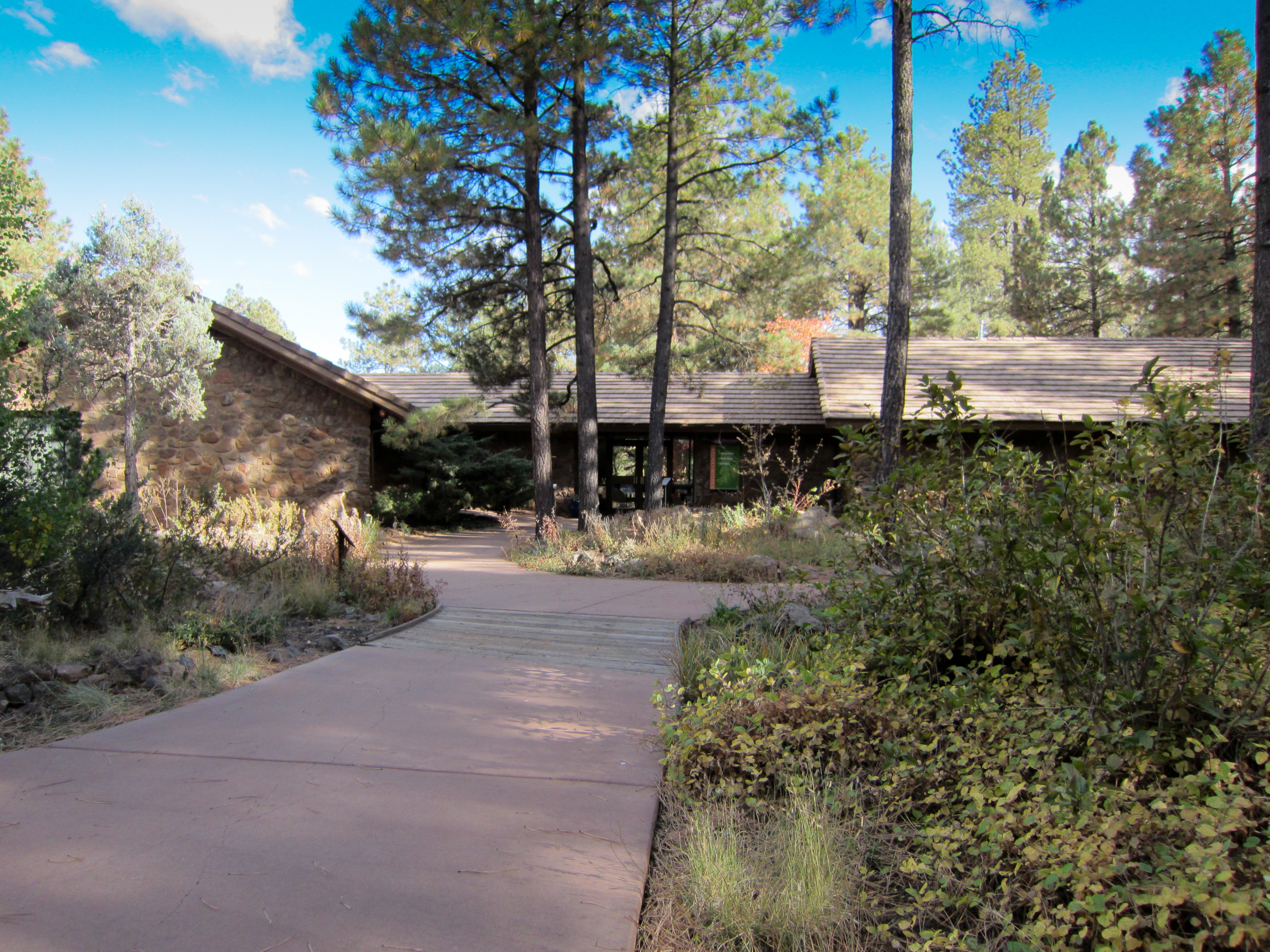
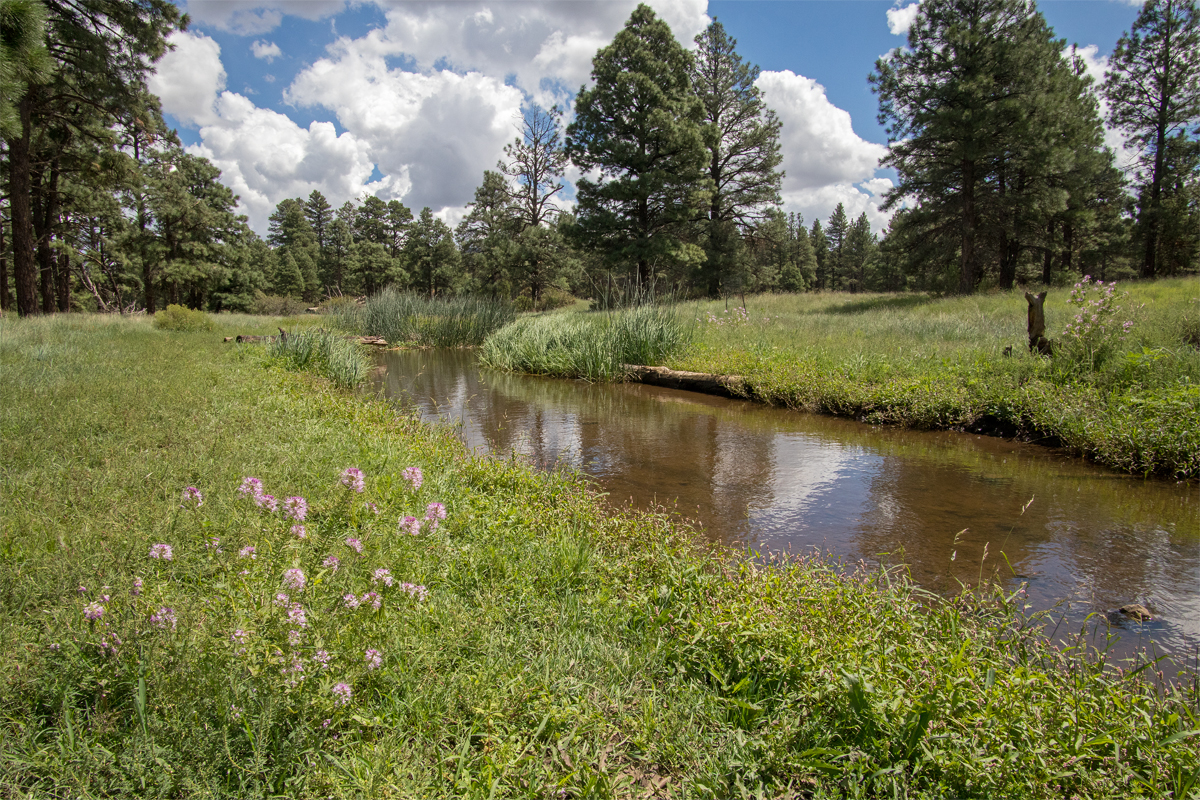
- Downtown Flagstaff Northern Arizona University Lowell Observatory Flagstaff Station Coconino County Courthouse The Arboretum at Flagstaff Rio de Flag

- Flag Seal
- Nicknames: City of Seven Wonders, Dark Sky City
- Location in the United States Flagstaff (the United States)
- Coordinates: 35°10′50″N 111°37′12″W
- Country: United States
- State: Arizona
- County: Coconino
- Settled: 1876
- Incorporated: 1928

Government
  - Type: Council–manager
  - Body: Flagstaff City Council
  - Mayor: Becky Daggett

Area
  - City: 66.08 sq mi (171.15 km^{2})
  - Land: 66.03 sq mi (171.02 km^{2})
  - Water: 0.054 sq mi (0.14 km^{2})
- Elevation: 6,821 ft (2,079 m)

Population (2020)
  - City: 76,831
  - Density: 1,163.6/sq mi (449.26/km^{2})
  - Metro: 145,101 (US: 291st)
- Demonym: Flagstonian or Flagstaffer or Flagstaffian
- Time zone: UTC−7 (MST (no DST))
- ZIP Codes: 86001–86002, 86004–86005, 86011
- Area code: 928
- FIPS code: 04-23620
- GNIS ID(s): 2410509
- Website: flagstaff.az.gov

Flagstaff (/ˈflæɡ.stæf/ FLAG-staf) is a city in and the county seat of Coconino County, Arizona, United States. As of the 2020 United States census, the city's population was 76,831.

Flagstaff is the principal city of the Flagstaff metropolitan area, which includes all of Coconino County, and has a population of 145,101. Flagstaff lies near the southwestern edge of the Colorado Plateau and within the San Francisco volcanic field, along the western side of the largest contiguous ponderosa pine forest in the continental United States. The city sits at around 7,000 feet (2,100 m) and is next to Mount Elden, just south of the San Francisco Peaks, the highest mountain range in the state of Arizona. Humphreys Peak, the highest point in Arizona at 12,637 feet (3,852 m), is about 10 miles (16 km) north of Flagstaff in Kachina Peaks Wilderness. The geology of the area includes exposed rock from the Mesozoic and Paleozoic eras, with Moenkopi Formation red sandstone having once been quarried in the city; many of the historic downtown buildings were constructed with it. The Rio de Flag river runs through the city, but only flows in response to rain or snowmelt.

Originally settled by the pre-Columbian native Sinagua people, the area of Flagstaff has fertile land from volcanic ash after eruptions in the 11th century. It was first settled as the present-day city in 1876. Local businessmen lobbied for Route 66 to pass through the city, which it did, turning the local industry from lumber to tourism and developing downtown Flagstaff. In 1930, Pluto was discovered from Flagstaff at its Lowell Observatory. The city developed further through to the end of the 1960s, with various observatories also used to choose Moon landing sites for the Apollo missions. Through the 1970s and 1980s, the downtown fell into disrepair, but was revitalized with a major cultural heritage project in the 1990s.

The city remains an important distribution hub for companies such as Nestlé Purina PetCare, and is home to the U.S. Naval Observatory Flagstaff Station, the U.S. Geological Survey, and Northern Arizona University. Flagstaff has a strong tourism sector, due to its proximity to the Grand Canyon, Oak Creek Canyon, the Arizona Snowbowl, Meteor Crater, and Historic Route 66.

== Etymology ==
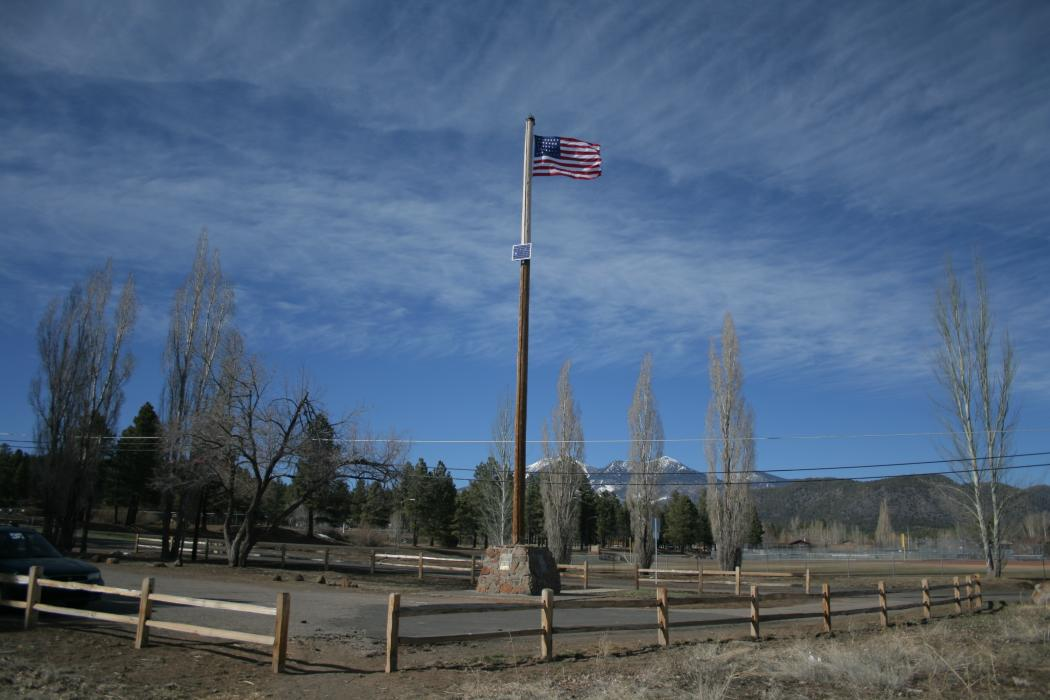
Flagstaff's eponymous flagstaff

At the time of Beale's wagon road, the area was known as Antelope Spring, after the spring at the foot of Mars Hill (now called Antelope/Old Town Spring). The name Flagstaff comes from an actual flagstaff made from a stripped pine tree that was erected at the spring, which McMillan was using as his sheep camp, on July 4, 1876.

The common story tells that the flag-raising for which the town was named occurred when a ponderosa pine flagpole made by a scouting party from Boston (known as the "Second Boston Party") was raised to celebrate the United States Centennial. Various other stories have been told of the circumstances. One says that on July 4, 1855, a surveyor for the railroad by the name of Samuel Clark Hudson, accompanied by his team, climbed a tall pine tree and tied a flag, with another saying it was Beale's men who raised the flag in 1859. The town was still known as Antelope Spring in 1871.

After the town took the name Flagstaff, it began to be known as 'Old Town' (Note: In all sources, 'Old Town' (and variations) is written within apostrophes or quotation marks.) for a period, and was known by different names when the Atlantic and Pacific Railroad was being built through the area in 1882. It may have been known as 'Flagstaff Spring' for a while, and 'Old Town Spring' after this before simply 'Old Town', a name given after a fire destroyed much of the town, with a new community then raised a few hundred yards away called 'New Town'. Another version of the Old and New Town names says that the railroad depot was moved by half a mile to prevent hill starts, and business owners soon followed it, displacing the commerce of the town to Front Street of 'New Town' while the houses were still in 'Old Town' with the spring; when the fire burned down 'Old Town', 'New Town' remained. The name Flagstaff was reinstated in 1884 when a post office was introduced alongside the railroad depot.

The city has different names in local Native languages. In Navajo, it is known as Kinłání Dookʼoʼoosłííd Biyaagi. This name is formed from Kinłání, meaning "many houses" or city, Dookʼoʼoosłííd, the name for the San Francisco Peaks but literally "the summit which never melts", and Biyaagi, indicating 'below' (see translations of "below; in a place beneath" on wiktionary): the city below the San Francisco Peaks. The word Kinłání alone may refer to Flagstaff, but also can refer to Durango, Colorado. In Havasupai, Flagstaff is known as Wii Hagnbaj. This is also a name for the San Francisco Peaks, and literally means "snowy mountain".

== History ==
=== Early history ===
The Sinagua people were a pre-Columbian culture that occupied a large area in Arizona between c. 500 and 1425 CE. The Northern Sinagua were living in the pine forests of northern Arizona before moving into the area that is now Flagstaff about 700 CE. The 1064 and 1066 eruptions of Sunset Crater covered the area in ash, which greatly enriched the soil for farming; this also caused a population growth in the area, with Ancestral Puebloans and Cohonina people also moving to the Wupatki site near the city.

The Northern Sinagua had various cultural phases, including Sunset Crater, the Rio de Flag (leaving the Picture Canyon site), Angell and Winona, Padre Canyon, Elden Pueblo, Turkey Hill Pueblo, Clear Creek, and Walnut Canyon. The Sinagua peoples left the area by the early 15th century, likely moving north and later becoming the Hopi. The San Francisco Peaks, which overlook Flagstaff, are a sacred site in Hopi culture.

Until western expansion in the 1860s, the Yavapai, specifically the Wi:pukba (Northeastern Yavapai), occupied the land up to the San Francisco Peaks. The Yavapai land in the area saw overlap with the land of the Northern Tonto Apache that stretched across the San Francisco Peaks to the Little Colorado River. Of the Northern Tonto Apache, two tribes lived within the area of present-day Flagstaff: the Oak Creek band and the Mormon Lake band. The Mormon Lake band were centered around Flagstaff and were exclusively hunter-gatherers, traveling around places like the foot of the San Francisco Peaks, at Mount Elden, Lake Mary, Stoneman Lake, and Padre Canyon.

=== 19th century ===
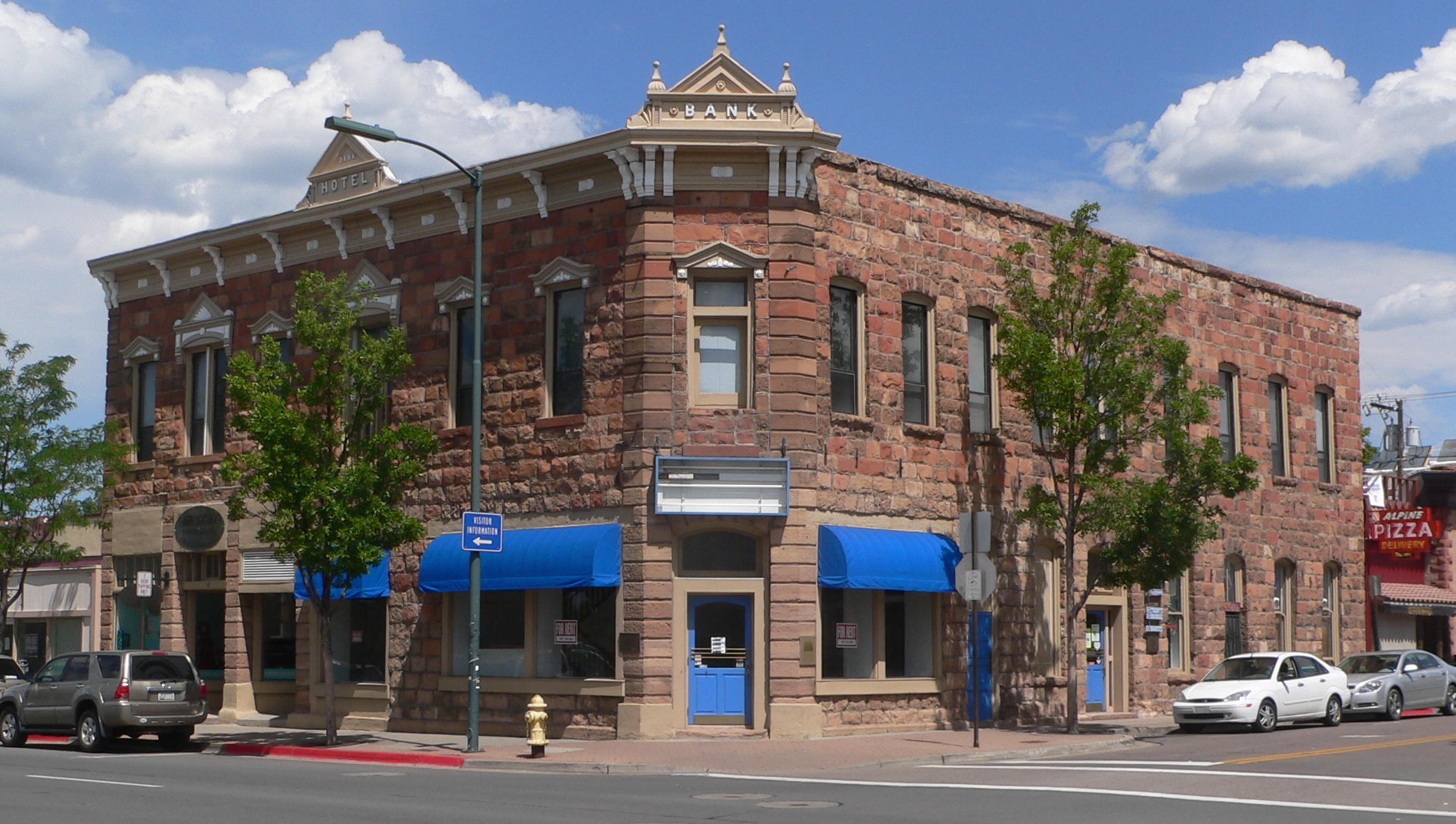
The Bank Hotel, also known as the McMillan building, in 2012

The area of Flagstaff had a wagon road to California in the 1800s, constructed by Edward Fitzgerald Beale's men. The first non-Native settlement in the area was established by Edward Whipple, who opened a saloon on the wagon road in 1871. The first permanent settlement came in 1876, when Thomas F. McMillan built a cabin just north of the present-day main town. McMillan was a key developer of Northern Arizona.

During the 1880s, Flagstaff began to grow, and by 1886, Flagstaff was the largest city on the railroad line between Albuquerque and the West Coast of the United States. In 1888, McMillan purchased an unfinished building that sits at the present-day intersection of Leroux Street and Route 66/Santa Fe Avenue, turning it into a bank and hotel known as the Bank Hotel. Coconino County was created in 1891, and Flagstaff was chosen as its county seat over nearby Williams.

In 1894, A. E. Douglass recommended Flagstaff to Percival Lowell as the site for the Lowell Observatory, where it was built on Mars Hill. Flagstaff also became incorporated as a town in 1894. The city grew rapidly, primarily due to its location along the east–west transcontinental railroad line in the United States. In the 1890s, the Arizona Lumber and Timber Company was founded by the Riordan brothers to process timber. Michael and Tim Riordan worked in Flagstaff, and introduced electricity to the town for this purpose. The Riordan brothers established the first library in Flagstaff. The CO Bar Ranch was opened in about 1886 by the Babbitt brothers for cattle. The Babbitt family would be very influential in northern Arizona for decades. In 1899, the Northern Arizona Normal School was established; it was renamed to Northern Arizona University (NAU) in 1966.

On January 1, 1900, John Weatherford opened the Weatherford Hotel in Flagstaff. Weatherford opened the town's first movie theater in 1911; it collapsed under heavy snowfall a few years later, but he soon replaced it with the Orpheum Theater. The Weatherford Hotel and Orpheum Theater are still in use today.

=== 1912–1969 ===
A westbound Arizona U.S. Route 66 sign from 1956

The state of Arizona was admitted to the Union in 1912. Flagstaff saw its first tourism boom in the early years of the 1900s, becoming known as the City of Seven Wonders, as the "Seven Wonders" of the wider Flagstaff area – listed as the Coconino National Forest, Grand Canyon, Oak Creek Canyon, San Francisco Peaks, Sunset Crater, Walnut Canyon, and Wupatki National Monument – were more widely known. (Note: Other nearby natural wonders include Canyon de Chelly, Lake Powell, Meteor Crater, Monument Valley, the Painted Desert, the Petrified Forest National Park, Picture Canyon, and Rainbow Bridge National Monument.)

==== U.S. Route 66 ====
In 1926, Route 66 was completed and ran through Flagstaff; the Babbitts and Riordans had staunchly supported it for the town. The railroad, which became the Santa Fe Railroad, had largely controlled Flagstaff until this point. The Santa Fe Railroad opened a new depot in Flagstaff in 1926, to combat Route 66. As part of the celebrations, Front Street was renamed Santa Fe Avenue. The people of Flagstaff collectively funded the Hotel Monte Vista, which opened on January 1, 1927, preparing for the next tourism boom. Flagstaff was then incorporated as a city in 1928, with over 3,000 residents, and in 1929, the city's first motel, the Motel Du Beau, was built at the intersection of Beaver Street and Phoenix Avenue. Flagstaff became a popular tourist stop along Route 66, particularly due to its proximity to the natural wonders. In the last years of the 1920s, tourism took over from traditional industries.

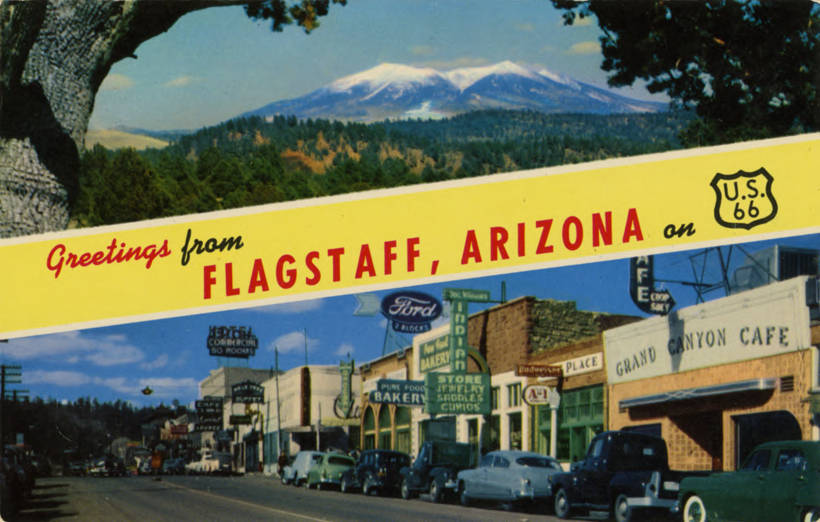
A 1946 postcard of Flagstaff with a U.S. Route 66 insignia to the right

During the Great Depression, Route 66 brought unemployed workers heading to California, known as "auto nomads" in Flagstaff, who became unpopular as they could not afford to buy gas or food, financially damaging the city by taxing its resources and not contributing to the economy. Flagstaff had also been highlighted on the map by Clyde Tombaugh's 1930 discovery of Pluto from the Lowell Observatory. However, the importance of Route 66 to cross-country travel, and thus to Arizona's interests on a national level, did mean that it received a large share of state funding through the Depression, with highway maintenance and unemployment acts providing over $1 million of funding in May 1933. In 1935, many residents had enough disposable income to remodel their homes or build new ones.

In 1955, the United States Naval Observatory Flagstaff Station was established. Through the 1950s the city conducted the Urban Renewal Project, improving housing quality in the Southside neighborhood that was largely populated by people of Spanish, Basque, and Mexican heritage. Flagstaff grew and prospered through the 1960s. During the Apollo program in the 1960s, the Lowell Observatory Clark Telescope was used by the United States Geological Survey (USGS) to map the Moon for the lunar expeditions, enabling the mission planners to choose a safe landing site for the lunar modules.

=== 1970s–present ===
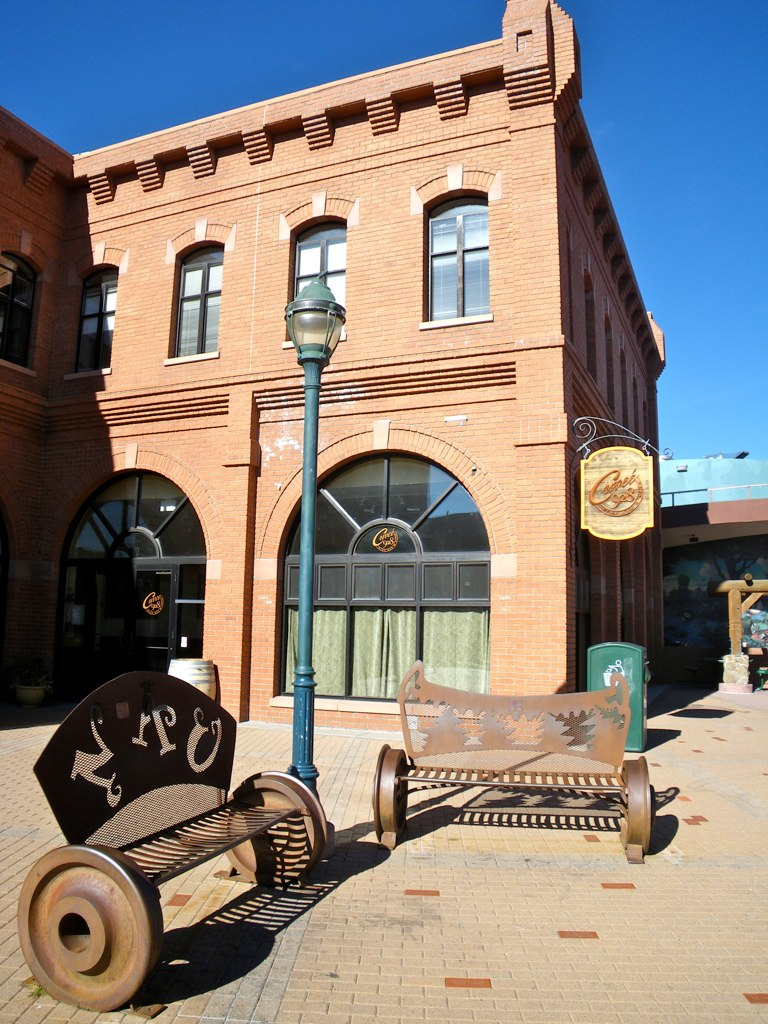
Benches commemorating Flagstaff's traditional labor forces in Heritage Square

As the baby boomer generation began to start their own families in the 1970s and 1980s, many moved to Flagstaff based on its small-town feel, and the population began to grow again; there were not enough jobs to support the many educated individuals moving to the city. The city did not expand its infrastructure downtown despite the growing population, causing problems. Several historic buildings from the 1800s were also destroyed for construction of new ones, or leveled completely. Downtown Flagstaff became an uninviting place, and many businesses started to move out of the area, causing an economic and social decline.

During the 1990s, the city redeveloped. Store owners in downtown supported the Main Street programs of preservation-based revitalization, and in 1992, the city hired a new manager to improve the area: a different mix of shops and restaurants opened up to take advantage of the area's historical appeal. Heritage Square was built as the center of the revitalized downtown, the local Flagstaff Pulliam Airport began running more flights to Phoenix, and the school district was expanded with a third high school, Sinagua High School.

On October 24, 2001, Flagstaff was recognized by the International Dark-Sky Association as the world's first "International Dark-Sky City".

== Geography ==
Flagstaff is the county seat of Coconino County. According to the United States Census Bureau, the city has a total area of 63.9 square miles (165.5 km^{2}), of which only 0.03 square miles (0.08 km^{2}) (0.08%) is water. Flagstaff lies at approximately 7,000 feet (2,130 m) elevation, and is surrounded by the largest contiguous ponderosa pine forest in North America. It is in a mountainous area, and lies along the Rio de Flag watercourse. It is about 146 miles (235 km) north of the State capital, Phoenix.

The geology of the area is in line with that of the Colorado Plateau on which it lies, with the Moenkopi red sandstone abundant in the city also used to build many of the distinctive buildings forming its cityscape. The cityscape of Flagstaff is its historic downtown area centered on Heritage Square, with the historic nature of its restored buildings and local theme iconic to the city and representative of its culture. Flagstaff is one of the United States' sunniest and snowiest cities, with a variable "semi-arid" climate and a monsoon season in summer.

The San Francisco Peaks are a main aspect of Flagstaff's local geography and can be seen from everywhere in the city. Humphreys Peak is the highest point in Arizona at 12,637 feet (3,852 m). Several trails around the peaks provide views of the Grand Canyon. While the most popular access point is Arizona Snowbowl (southwest face), the peaks can also be approached from the north and east. The peaks are about 10 miles (16 km) northwest of downtown Flagstaff, with the Snowbowl resort just southwest of Humphreys Peak. The wildlife of the peaks include mule deer, elk, turkey vultures, and black bears, all visible from public trails.

=== Geology and topography ===
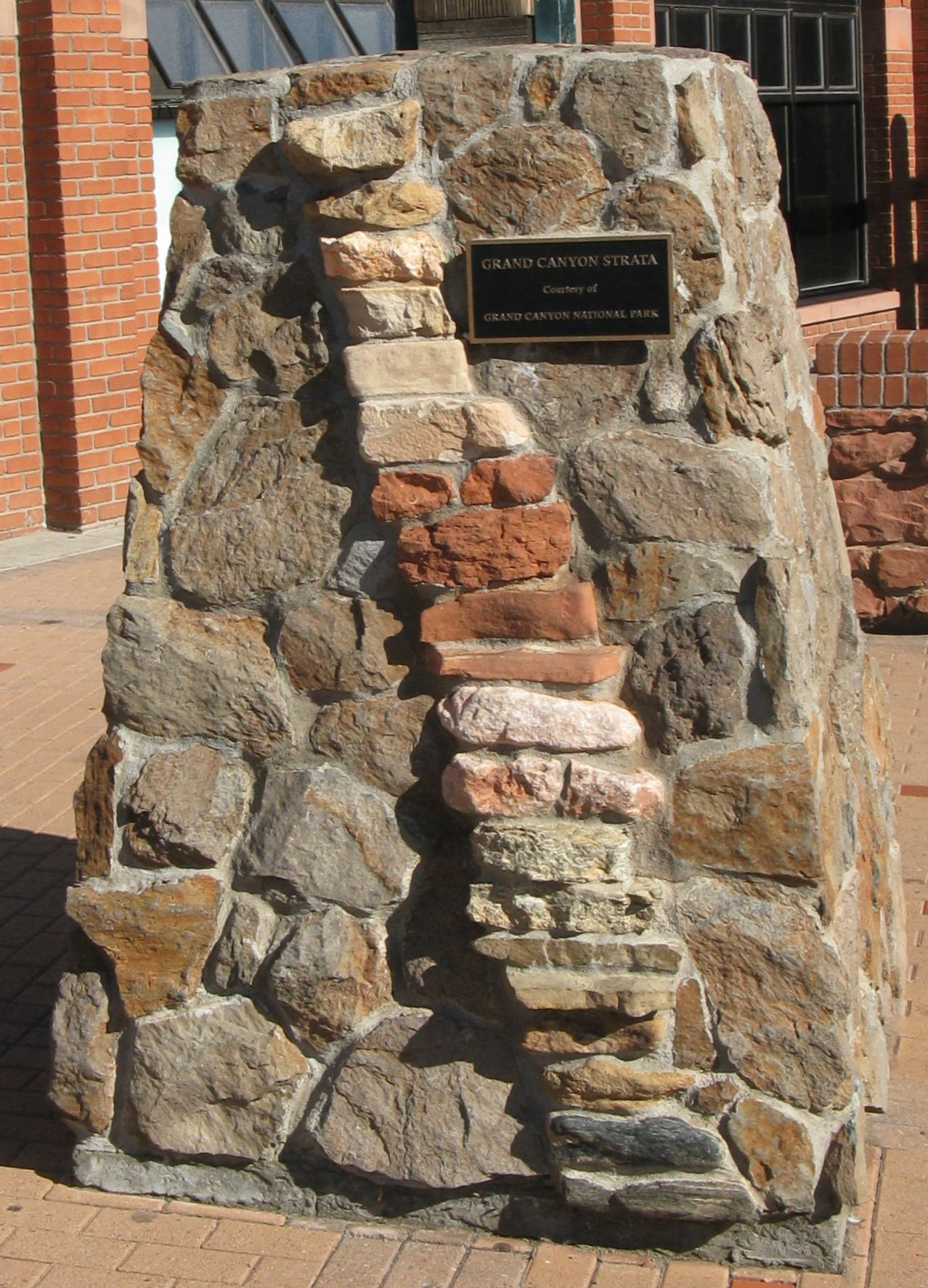
Local rock strata monument in Heritage Square of downtown Flagstaff

Flagstaff lies on the southern edge of the Colorado Plateau, and is largely limestone under San Francisco volcanic field. The oldest rock types of the area are part of North America's original crust, Precambrian granite and schist from 1.7 to 1.8 billion years ago. On top of this is Paleozoic sandstone, limestone, shale and siltstone deposited on what was then (544 to 248 million years ago) different surfaces, including a shallow seabed, muddy land, and sandy desert. The rock layers from this period are (bottom to top): Tapeats Sandstone, Bright Angel Shale and Muav Limestone, Martin Formation, Redwall Limestone, Supai Group, Coconino Sandstone, Toroweap Formation, and Kaibab Limestone. The last three of these are still exposed. On top of the Paleozoic rock is Mesozoic Moenkopi Formation, from 248 to 65 million years ago. Other Mesozoic layers formed on top of this, but were eroded away. In the Flagstaff area, layers of rock from the Paleozoic and Mesozoic eras accumulated up to 10,000 feet (3,000 m) deep, but most of this was eroded. A soft basalt layer covers some of the rock at the surface.

Moenkopi Formation red sandstone is a distinctive feature of Flagstaff, as it was used as a building material from the 1880s because of its fire retardant properties. The source used for quarrying most of this rock was a deposit 1 mile east of the town, which fell under the control of Charles Begg in 1887, who then began selling the stone across the southwest – after he made a successful sale in California that expanded the business, he was replaced in 1888 by a master quarryman. While it was used as building material across the West, some of Flagstaff's most prominent buildings are famous for the stone, including the Bank Hotel, Weatherford Hotel, Babbitt Brothers Building, Coconino County Courthouse, and various NAU buildings, including Old Main.

In the Laramide orogeny, which began about 65–75 million years ago, the Western United States underwent stress in rock formation; in the Four Corners region this pushed up the preexisting layers and ultimately formed the Colorado Plateau (and the Rocky Mountains). Around Flagstaff more specifically, this process deformed flat rock layers into folds, and allowed surface rivers to cut deep canyons in the younger rock layers. From about 25 million years ago, more faults were broken again in Flagstaff, and volcanic activity began about 6 million years ago with magma flowing up these faults to create lava flows. Eruptions occurred between 3 million and 1,000 years ago, affecting the Paleozoic and Mesozoic rocks. The city's Mount Elden is a lava dome made of dacite, Sunset Crater is the youngest feature of the San Francisco volcanic field and formed in the last 1,000 years by an explosive eruption, while S P Crater was formed between 75,000 and 70,000 years ago by piles of lapilli and volcanic bombs spouting from a lava lake.

In the 1960s, the geology and topography of the Flagstaff area, including formations like Meteor Crater, was seen as similar to environments that would be encountered on the Moon in terms of planetary geology. The Astrogeology Research Program was therefore moved to Flagstaff in 1962, with the program completing in 1963, to train astronauts.

=== Climate ===
Köppen map of Arizona (Oregon State University, 2016)

Flagstaff's climate is geographically specific. The type on the Köppen climate classification system has been reported as both a Hemiboreal climate (Dsb and Dfb), and a cold semi-arid climate (BSk). It is consistently described as "semi-arid".

The hottest temperature on record is 97 °F (36 °C) in July 1973. This is far below a normal summer day in lowland areas of the state. The coldest temperature on record is −30 °F (−34 °C) in January 1937. Warm summer nights are very uncommon with the all-time record being 68 °F (20 °C) in July 2002 and a regular summer averages a very mild 59 °F (15 °C) for the warmest low. Cold daily maximums are occasional, but rarely severe. The record low high is 5 °F (−15 °C) from January 1963, but the mean for the coldest maximum is relatively close to freezing at 24 °F (−4 °C).

Like most of the state, Northern Arizona experiences a summer monsoon season from July to September, with Flagstaff's wettest months being July and August, and its driest being June, all in the summer; Mediterranean climates have wet season only in the winter. Mediterranean climate categorization does not consider snowfall. Semi-arid climates will receive 10–20 inches (250–510 mm) of annual rainfall, while Flagstaff experiences more. (Note: See climate data table.)

Flagstaff's hardiness zone is mostly 6a, with some areas 5b, meaning plants withstand temperatures down to −15 °F (−26 °C). It is in the Transition life zone; the concept of life zones was first observed in the Flagstaff area. Wind in Flagstaff typically blows southwesterly throughout the year, based on topographical features. The city's climate data is observed from Flagstaff Pulliam Airport.

The city receives precipitation every year, with two distinct wet periods in the summer and winter; the summer monsoon season accounts for 34% of annual rainfall, with the winter producing 28%. The summer monsoon season, originating from the Mexican monsoon period, is also wetter than winter, with an average 7 inches (180 mm) compared to the winter's 6 inches (150 mm). Before the summer monsoon each year there is a dry period in May and June. Long-term average precipitation is 21.6 inches (550 mm) annually, with much heavier rainfall attributed to El Niño events. Comparatively, La Niña events have caused below-average rainfall.

Since 1996 the city has been experiencing its driest period, known as the Early-21st Century Drought. As of 2007, Richard Hereford of USGS speculated that the effects of the drought, predicted to last until the late 2020s, may be severe because of Flagstaff's growing population and global warming. The summer wet season is more reliable and consistent than other times of year, but due to the high temperatures of the area this rainfall is quickly lost to evaporation. During the Early-21st Century Drought, rainfall has been consistently below average in all but the summer season, with temperature averages for all but the summer (which has remained consistent) also increasing.

Equally, snowfall has been lower during the extended dry period, though the city set a new record for its highest daily snowfall on February 21, 2019, with 35.9 inches (91 cm) and was still ranked as the United States' third-snowiest city in 2020 (based on 2018–19 National Oceanic and Atmospheric Administration data). Flagstaff has consistently been among the snowiest cities in the United States, and snow and winter culture is argued by Michael Weeks to be a large part of Flagstaff's identity. The Arizona Snowbowl is a major attraction, though it has had to make artificial snow during warmer seasons, and the city tried to launch a bid to be the host city of the 1960 Winter Olympics. The maximum daily snow cover was 83 inches (210 cm) on December 20, 1967, although the mean maximum for a full winter is only 20 inches (51 cm). However, due to the infrequent and scattered nature of the snowstorms, persistent snowpack into spring is rare. One notable exception occurred during the severe winter of 1915–16, when successive Pacific storms buried the city under over 70 inches (178 cm) of snow, and some residents were snowbound in their homes for several days. The earliest seasonal trace of snowfall occurred on September 19, 1965, and the latest on May 29 in both 1971 and 1990.

Though one of the least-sunny cities in Arizona, Flagstaff still ranks among the United States' sunniest cities, having sunshine for an average 78% of the year. The city receives much more sunshine than other snowy cities, which are primarily in the north of the country.

==== Seasonal weather ====
There are four seasons in Flagstaff, with cool to cold winter temperatures averaging 45 °F (7 °C) and warm summer temperatures averaging 80 °F (27 °C), much cooler than much of Arizona; the average annual snowfall is 97 inches (250 cm). Spring begins in April with cool or comfortable weather. Sometimes, snow reappears in May, but the spring period is typically mild and dry, lasting until early June. The summer is warm, measured between days when freezing temperatures occur, beginning in June – the last freezing temperature generally in early June – and ending in September. Flagstaff's summer will receive a few days of daytime temperatures above 90 °F (32 °C), with much cooler nighttime temperatures typically in the region of 40 °F (4 °C). Flagstaff's summers are also notable for the monsoon season in July and August, when thunderstorms occur almost daily. Thunderstorm activity happens mostly during the daytime.

Freezing temperatures (below 32 °F or 0 °C) return towards the end of September, with the mild fall season having daytime temperatures around 60 °F (16 °C). With its many trees, leaves do change color in Flagstaff's fall, with the change starting at the end of September and happening throughout October. Fall lasts only until the snow comes in November, with winter marked between periods of snowfall, typically from November until mid-April at the latest. Temperatures in winter are usually below freezing, going no higher than around 40 °F (4 °C) in the day, even in sunshine. Nights can regularly plummet below 20 °F (−7 °C). A combination of snow cover and high pressure occurring during winter months will cause the temperature to drop further, once reaching a record low of −30 °F (−34 °C). Flagstaff's winter wet season is caused by Pacific storms and lasts from November through April.

Climate data for Flagstaff Pulliam Airport, Arizona (1991–2020 normals, sun 1981–2010, humidity 1961–1990, (Note: Mean monthly maxima and minima (i.e. the expected highest and lowest temperature readings at any point during the year or given month) calculated based on data at said location from 1991 to 2020.) extremes 1898–present) (Note: Official records for Flagstaff were kept at the Weather Bureau in downtown from September 8, 1898 to January 11, 1950, and at Pulliam Airport since January 12, 1950. For more information, see ThreadEx)
Month	Jan	Feb	Mar	Apr	May	Jun	Jul	Aug	Sep	Oct	Nov	Dec	Year
Record high °F (°C)	66 (19)	71 (22)	84 (29)	80 (27)	89 (32)	96 (36)	97 (36)	93 (34)	91 (33)	85 (29)	74 (23)	68 (20)	97 (36)
Mean maximum °F (°C)	56.9 (13.8)	58.9 (14.9)	65.7 (18.7)	72.8 (22.7)	80.5 (26.9)	88.6 (31.4)	90.5 (32.5)	87.4 (30.8)	82.9 (28.3)	75.5 (24.2)	66.9 (19.4)	58.7 (14.8)	91.4 (33.0)
Mean daily maximum °F (°C)	43.4 (6.3)	45.7 (7.6)	52.2 (11.2)	59.2 (15.1)	68.1 (20.1)	79.1 (26.2)	82.0 (27.8)	79.3 (26.3)	74.1 (23.4)	63.6 (17.6)	52.1 (11.2)	43.0 (6.1)	61.8 (16.6)
Daily mean °F (°C)	30.5 (−0.8)	32.8 (0.4)	38.0 (3.3)	43.7 (6.5)	51.3 (10.7)	60.8 (16.0)	66.7 (19.3)	64.9 (18.3)	58.3 (14.6)	47.6 (8.7)	37.5 (3.1)	30.0 (−1.1)	46.8 (8.2)
Mean daily minimum °F (°C)	17.6 (−8.0)	19.6 (−6.9)	23.8 (−4.6)	28.2 (−2.1)	34.6 (1.4)	42.5 (5.8)	51.4 (10.8)	50.6 (10.3)	42.5 (5.8)	31.5 (−0.3)	23.0 (−5.0)	16.9 (−8.4)	31.8 (−0.1)
Mean minimum °F (°C)	−1.4 (−18.6)	2.5 (−16.4)	8.1 (−13.3)	17.1 (−8.3)	24.6 (−4.1)	31.1 (−0.5)	41.4 (5.2)	42.3 (5.7)	30.9 (−0.6)	20.0 (−6.7)	8.1 (−13.3)	−1.4 (−18.6)	−5.5 (−20.8)
Record low °F (°C)	−30 (−34)	−23 (−31)	−16 (−27)	−2 (−19)	7 (−14)	22 (−6)	32 (0)	24 (−4)	20 (−7)	−2 (−19)	−13 (−25)	−23 (−31)	−30 (−34)
Average precipitation inches (mm)	2.05 (52)	2.17 (55)	1.88 (48)	0.89 (23)	0.77 (20)	0.30 (7.6)	2.61 (66)	3.04 (77)	1.84 (47)	1.52 (39)	1.55 (39)	1.90 (48)	20.52 (521)
Average snowfall inches (cm)	20.9 (53)	19.3 (49)	15.6 (40)	5.0 (13)	1.1 (2.8)	0.0 (0.0)	0.0 (0.0)	0.0 (0.0)	0.0 (0.0)	1.5 (3.8)	8.2 (21)	18.5 (47)	90.1 (229)
Average extreme snow depth inches (cm)	10.7 (27)	9.8 (25)	9.3 (24)	3.3 (8.4)	0.3 (0.76)	0.0 (0.0)	0.0 (0.0)	0.0 (0.0)	0.0 (0.0)	0.6 (1.5)	3.7 (9.4)	8.8 (22)	17.4 (44)
Average precipitation days (≥ 0.01 in)	7.0	7.6	6.8	4.9	4.5	2.2	12.0	13.3	7.5	5.3	4.4	6.7	82.2
Average snowy days (≥ 0.1 in)	6.2	6.1	4.7	1.9	0.9	0.0	0.0	0.0	0.0	0.5	2.3	5.7	28.3
Average relative humidity (%)	61.9	59.5	54.9	46.5	39.4	33.6	51.1	58.1	54.7	52.6	56.9	60.6	52.5
Average dew point °F (°C)	15.3 (−9.3)	16.7 (−8.5)	18.7 (−7.4)	20.5 (−6.4)	24.3 (−4.3)	28.4 (−2.0)	44.1 (6.7)	45.9 (7.7)	38.3 (3.5)	27.3 (−2.6)	19.9 (−6.7)	15.1 (−9.4)	26.2 (−3.2)
Mean monthly sunshine hours	231.7	228.6	286.3	321.0	369.5	371.8	324.2	311.9	298.5	282.8	229.3	219.8	3,475.4
Percentage possible sunshine	74	75	77	82	85	86	73	75	80	81	74	72	78
Source 1: NOAA (relative humidity 1961–1990, sun 1973–1990)
Source 2: Weather Atlas (UV)

=== Flora and fauna ===
Flagstaff is an area "of great ecological variation" due to its diverse habitat life zones. Tree species abound the area, which covers three arboreal life zones: Douglas fir and aspen forest, Ponderosa pine forest, and Pinyon-juniper woodland. It is at the heart of the Coconino National Forest. Within the Transition zone of the forest, including in the city, there are huge stands of ponderosa pine. Other species scattered among this region include Gambel oak, quaking aspen, and Rocky Mountain juniper trees.

The Coconino National Forest and Flagstaff are within the largest contiguous ponderosa pine forest in North America. Here, this tree type is formed as a climax forest, with groups of trees containing different ages spread among the forest. Some of the groups are only a few trees, some are acres large; other groups are even-aged. The irregularity of the tree groups leaves natural openings in the forest. A grass cover of Arizona fescue grows around the area and shrub exists, but there are few other tree species. As well as the Gambel oak, quaking aspen, and juniper trees, pinyons can be found among the pines. Some of the open forest space contains bunchgrass, and local animal species that roam on this include elk, mule deer, Merriam's Turkey, and Abert's squirrel.

The arboretum in Flagstaff has an extensive regional collection of the Penstemon genus and hosts an annual Penstemon Festival.

Coconino is also home to a variety of bird species, which is further diversified by species from desert climates south of the Mogollon Rim still mixing in the area. The nearby lakes also attract wildlife. Birds that live around or visit Flagstaff include the thick-billed kingbird, only documented in the area since 2016, the red-faced warbler, a Madrean species, and waterfowl including the Eurasian wigeon and American wigeon.

=== Cityscape ===
Flagstaff has a diverse cityscape and exists in distinct areas. Downtown Flagstaff is a "narrow and slender" area between the NAU campus at its south and the Museum of Northern Arizona at the north. Flagstaff is a smaller city, so its downtown is largely local and independent. The city's mall is found in East Flagstaff, as is a Harkins movie theater and a country club and golf course. Residential properties in East Flagstaff are larger and more rural than other parts of the city. North West Flagstaff is directly north of downtown, and is where the Snowbowl and Museum of Northern Arizona are found. West Flagstaff encompasses the area south and west of downtown, including NAU and the Lake Mary neighborhood. It also covers the airport and Fort Tuthill (county park and the Pepsi Amphitheater), being bordered to the south by the urban areas of Kachina Village and Mountainaire. Outside of the city proper, these urban areas have a "mountain-town feel". Flagstaff has an "urban forest park", Buffalo Park, which sits on top of McMillan Mesa and used to be home to a zoo in the 1960s. Buffalo Park/McMillan Mesa bisects the city, separating East Flagstaff from West Flagstaff and downtown.

== Demographics ==
Historical population
Census	Pop.	Note	%±
1890	964		—
1900	1,271		31.8%
1910	1,633		28.5%
1920	3,186		95.1%
1930	3,891		22.1%
1940	5,080		30.6%
1950	7,663		50.8%
1960	18,214		137.7%
1970	26,117		43.4%
1980	34,743		33.0%
1990	45,857		32.0%
2000	52,894		15.3%
2010	65,870		24.5%
2020	76,831		16.6%
U.S. Decennial Census

=== Racial and ethnic composition ===
Flagstaff city, Arizona – Racial and ethnic composition Note: the US Census treats Hispanic/Latino as an ethnic category. This table excludes Latinos from the racial categories and assigns them to a separate category. Hispanics/Latinos may be of any race.
Race / Ethnicity (NH = Non-Hispanic)	2020	2010	2000	1990	1980
White alone (NH)	59.9% (46,016)	64.4% (42,446)	69.5% (36,760)	72.5% (33,240)	73.8% (25,656)
Black alone (NH)	1.9% (1,430)	1.8% (1,173)	1.6% (866)	2.3% (1,060)	2.8% (985)
American Indian alone (NH)	10.4% (7,988)	11% (7,237)	9.5% (5,036)	8.5% (3,918)	6.4% (2,219)
Asian alone (NH)	2.5% (1,938)	1.8% (1,191)	1.2% (651)	1.4% (629)	1% (350)
Pacific Islander alone (NH)	0.3% (194)	0.2% (99)	0.1% (60)		
Other race alone (NH)	0.5% (375)	0.2% (121)	0.2% (99)	0.1% (38)	0.2% (83)
Multiracial (NH)	4.8% (3,717)	2.3% (1,509)	1.7% (922)	—	—
Hispanic/Latino (any race)	19.7% (15,173)	18.4% (12,094)	16.1% (8,500)	15.2% (6,972)	15.7% (5,450)

=== 2020 census ===
As of the 2020 census, Flagstaff had a population of 76,831. The median age was 26.3 years. 17.7% of residents were under the age of 18 and 9.8% of residents were 65 years of age or older. For every 100 females there were 92.7 males, and for every 100 females age 18 and over there were 90.3 males age 18 and over.

98.2% of residents lived in urban areas, while 1.8% lived in rural areas.

There were 26,632 households in Flagstaff, of which 27.3% had children under the age of 18 living in them. Of all households, 35.7% were married-couple households, 24.0% were households with a male householder and no spouse or partner present, and 29.8% were households with a female householder and no spouse or partner present. About 27.3% of all households were made up of individuals and 7.3% had someone living alone who was 65 years of age or older.

There were 31,369 housing units, of which 15.1% were vacant. The homeowner vacancy rate was 1.4% and the rental vacancy rate was 8.8%.

Racial composition as of the 2020 census
Race	Number	Percent
White	50,875	66.2%
Black or African American	1,579	2.1%
American Indian and Alaska Native	8,615	11.2%
Asian	2,004	2.6%
Native Hawaiian and Other Pacific Islander	199	0.3%
Some other race	5,423	7.1%
Two or more races	8,136	10.6%
Hispanic or Latino (of any race)	15,173	19.7%

=== 2010 census ===
According to the 2010 census, the population of the city was 65,870. This accounted for a population density of 831.9 people per square mile (321.2 people/km^{2}), with 26,254 housing units at an average density of 336.5 per square mile (129.9/km^{2}). The racial makeup of the city was 73.4% White, 1.9% Black or African American, 11.7% Native American, 1.9% Asian, 0.2% Pacific Islander, 7.3% from other races, and 3.6% from two or more races; 18.4% of the population were Hispanic or Latino of any race. The city's African American population is considerably lower than the U.S. average (1.9% versus 12.6%), while its Native American population is markedly higher (11.7% vs. 0.9%). This is primarily attributable to the city's proximity to several Native American reservations. Flagstaff's Native American community is chiefly Navajo, and there are about 5,500 people of Navajo ancestry living in the city.

A 1970 study found that while the Native American population of Flagstaff was generally under-counted in censuses, the Native residents found that Flagstaff as a border city with reservations was much more welcoming than similar towns, particularly noting Gallup, New Mexico, as one that was worse. The study also documented that while there was a distinctly Native neighborhood in the poorer Southside area of Flagstaff, the housing quality varied greatly, with middle class Native residencies elsewhere in the city.

Though Flagstaff has a low African American population, it had seen large immigration of black people from the Southern United States in the middle of the 20th century during the Great Migration. Though most moved to California, there was a significant number that settled in Flagstaff after hearing that the lumber industry of northern Arizona was some of the best paid work going, and a familiar vocation for those from southern states.

=== Crime ===
Flagstaff has two police departments: Flagstaff PD and NAU PD. NAU PD employs 30 officers and 25 students, and is responsible for law enforcement on the campus. Flagstaff PD will share information of concern about the neighborhoods surrounding the NAU campus to the NAU PD, and NAU PD may also respond to situations off-campus that involve students; NAU PD also investigates the missing person reports of students who are registered as resident on campus. From campus phones, all 911 calls will go to NAU PD.

The rate of crime in Flagstaff is above average, while its violent crime rate is below average, for the United States. For 2017, the FBI's Uniform Crime Report indicated for Flagstaff a rate of 290 cases of violent crime per 100,000 people and 2,710 cases of property crime per 100,000 population; the violent crime rate across the US was 382.9 per 100,000. In 2018, Flagstaff had a rate of 469.4 cases of all crimes per 100,000 people, up 10.7% on the total in 2017; this was below the average for Arizona, but above the average for the US. Until 2017, Flagstaff's crime rate was typically in line with the US average.

The safest neighborhood in Flagstaff is Elden Pueblo, with several downtown areas, NAU and the surrounding neighborhoods, Fort Valley, and Cosnino all in the top ten. In 2017, Flagstaff PD responded to four hostage situations, including in Tuba City, and fifteen explosive device removal calls. There were 3,262 criminal investigations. The Flagstaff narcotics task force headed up 'Operation Nightfall' between 2015 and 2017, aiming to prevent the use of I-40 through the city being used by Mexican drug cartels for trafficking, successfully seizing over 138 kg (304 lb) of cocaine. Within Flagstaff, there were over 100 arrests relating to other narcotics crimes.

NAU operates as a weapon-free and drug-free campus (even medical marijuana), with restrictions on alcohol possession for resident students over 21 within certain private areas of certain residence halls. In 2016, it became a tobacco-free campus. Additionally, alcohol may not be consumed in public on the campus. The overwhelming majority of NAU PD recorded crimes are related to drugs and alcohol, with hundreds of arrests each year and over 1500 disciplinary referrals in 2018. The second-most recorded area of crime on the campus is gender based violence (rape, domestic abuse), with a few dozen cases. There are over 160 blue light phones on the campus; each has a large button that connects directly to NAU PD and provides the location of the call to them.

== Economy ==
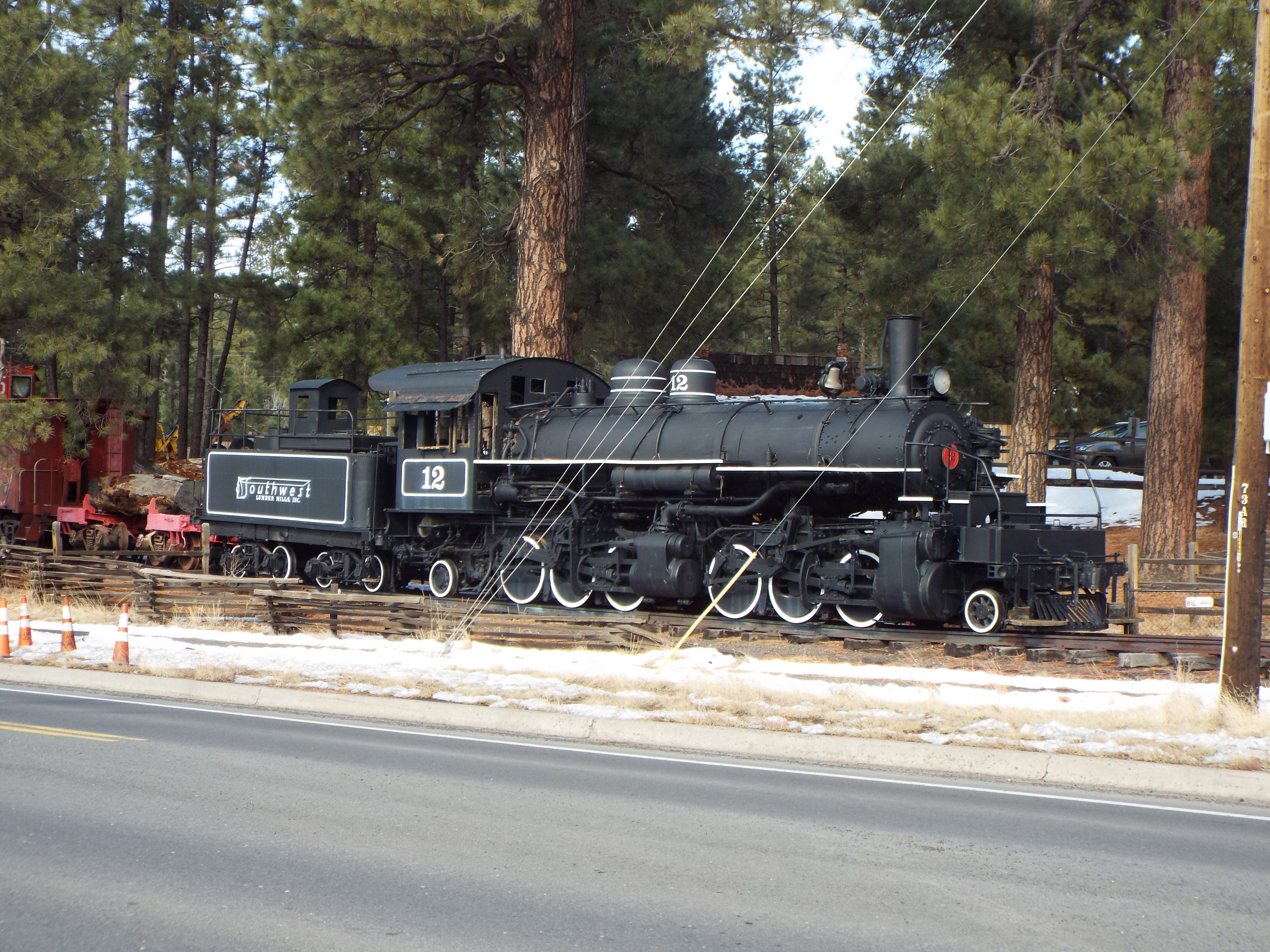
1929 Baldwin Locomotive No. 12

In its early days, the city's economic base comprised the lumber, railroad, and ranching industries. Today, that has largely been replaced by tourism, education, government, and transportation. Some of the larger employers in Flagstaff are Northern Arizona University, the Flagstaff Medical Center, and the Flagstaff Unified School District. Tourism is a large contributor to the economy, as the city receives over 5 million visitors per year.

Scientific and high tech research and development operations are in the city, including Lowell Observatory, Northern Arizona University, the United States Naval Observatory Flagstaff Station (NOFS) and the United States Geological Survey's (USGS) Flagstaff campus. Research is involved in observations of near-Earth phenomena such as asteroids and comets. In 2012 the observatory commissioned its Lowell Discovery Telescope, a 4.3-meter telescope with an instrument cube that can hold five instruments at once. Lowell Observatory and NOFS also are collaborators on the Navy Precision Optical Interferometer, on nearby Anderson Mesa. NOFS is heavily involved with the science of star catalogs and astrometry, or the positions and distances of stars and celestial objects.

There are five industrial parks in the city, situated near I-40 and I-17. Major manufacturers in Flagstaff include W. L. Gore & Associates, widely known as the maker of Gore-Tex; Nestlé Purina PetCare, manufacturer of pet food; SenesTech, a biotechnology research lab and manufacturer; and Joy Cone, manufacturer of ice cream cones. Walgreens operated a distribution center in the city until 2014.

=== Tourism ===
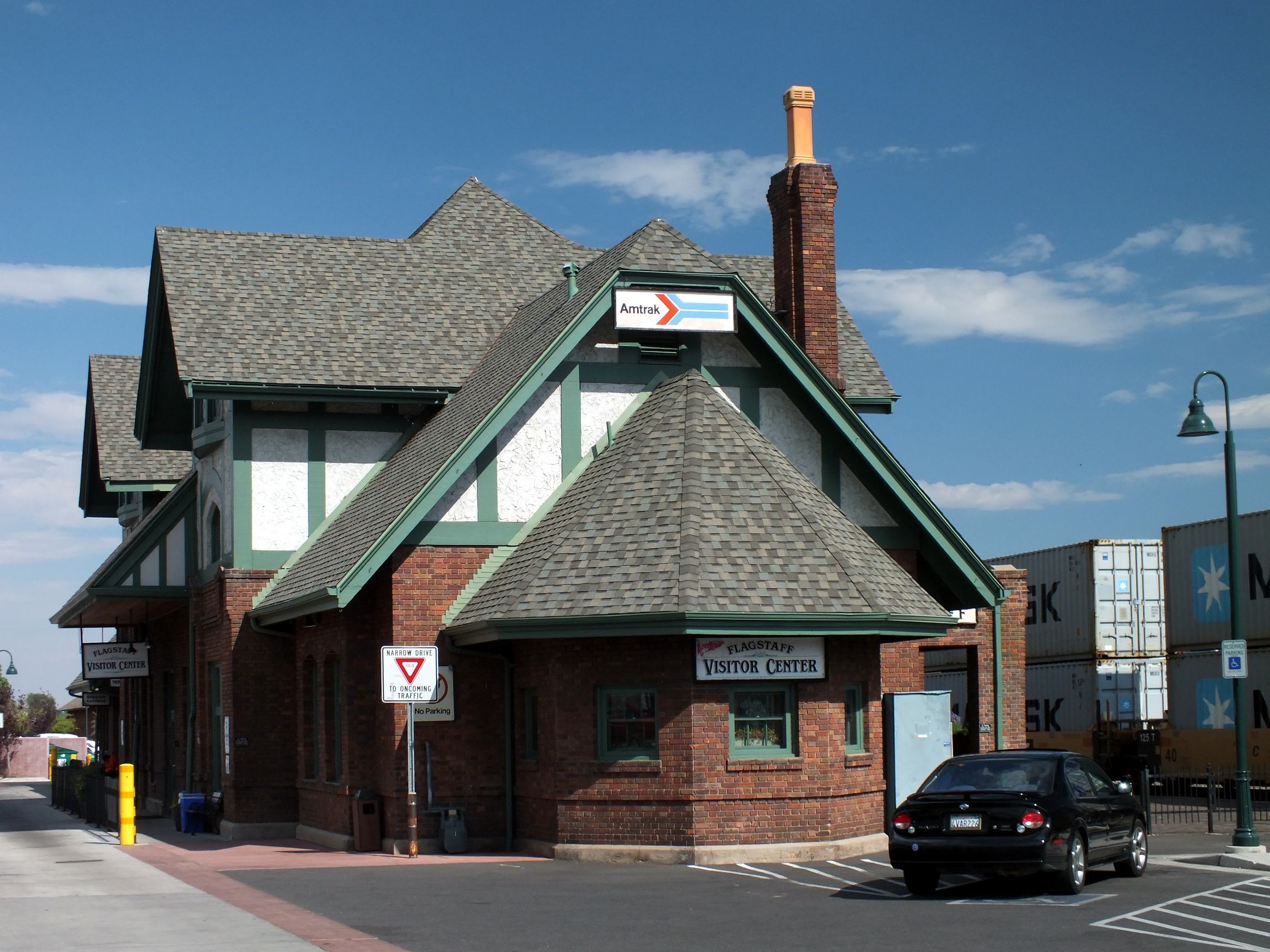
Flagstaff's visitors center at the railroad depot

Flagstaff has a thriving tourism industry, and has since the early 1900s, primarily stemming from its proximity to the Grand Canyon National Park and other natural wonders, giving it the nickname 'City of Seven Wonders'. Other natural wonders and native ruins, Route 66, and its astronomical history also bring tourism from out of state, while people from further south in Arizona visit Flagstaff because of its cooler climate in the summer and its ski resort in the winter. The city has numerous hotels and restaurants, including its historic hotels. The first hotel of the Ramada Inn chain opened in 1954 at the intersection of Routes 66, 89, and 89A, adjacent to what was then Arizona State College (now NAU). The original building is still intact, operating as a Super 8 motel. Flagstaff is said to attract a lot of the tourism for the entire county as it is the only large population center that can cater to tourists. In 1996, 39% of Coconino County residents were employed in tourism. There are large service sectors, particularly hotels and restaurants, in Flagstaff, with many of these companies having a close connection to NAU's School of Hotel and Restaurant Management, to employ these students.

Tourism to Flagstaff is a well-established industry, but still relies on environmental forces. Nature and weather conditions can damage tourism; having a mild but warm summer temperature attracts tourists from many locales, but storms and forest fires can be a detraction. Flagstaff also experiences very cold winters, and despite a successful ski resort still sees less tourism in this period; decreasing snow levels also threaten the winter industry. The development of Tusayan into the Grand Canyon gateway town also affected Flagstaff's capture of some overnight tourists.

The Grand Canyon, a Wonder of the World, is about 80 miles (130 km) northwest of Flagstaff. The first stagecoach tours to the Grand Canyon from the city began running from the Bank Hotel in 1892. In 2000, about 5 million people visiting the Grand Canyon also visited Flagstaff. As Rick Heffernon wrote, "the world recognizes only one Grand Canyon, and northern Arizona has it". However, he also suggested this can act to the area's detriment, as the Grand Canyon is a world-class marvel and competes with other attractions of the same prestige for visitors, which are all equally impressive; Flagstaff itself also competes with its nearby towns for access to the Grand Canyon, several of which have growing themes based on it (like Tusayan and the Grand Canyon Village).

Lowell Observatory celebrated its 125th anniversary in 2019 and continues to be a leading astronomical research center, as well as a popular destination for visitors. More than 100,000 people visited in both 2018 and 2019; in 2019 the observatory opened its new Giovale Open Deck Observatory, an observation plaza with a suite of six advanced telescopes.

Arizona Snowbowl does not publish their revenue or make it public knowledge, which makes it hard to calculate its impact on the Flagstaff economy. The Snowbowl supports approximately 200 full-time jobs and $12.08 million in economic output for the city of Flagstaff.

Heffernon suggested that the perception of tourism from the residents of Flagstaff could affect the industry, something researched in 1990 by NAU's Tim Schroeder. Schroeder saw six main areas of concern from Flagstaff residents: "Standard of Living for Residents; Future Use of Parks; Quality of Fire Protection; Occurrences of Crime; Changes in Community Values, Norms and Customs; and Population Density". He acknowledged that the focus on fire protection was anomalous, and likely caused by a particularly high concern surrounding recent wildfires at the time the survey had been conducted. The respondents to Schroeder's survey generally found that their "Opportunity for Jobs, Opportunity for Shopping, Quality of Fire Protection, Understanding Different People, Quality of Health Care, Availability of Cultural Arts, and Overall Quality of Life" had improved because of tourism to the area, but that standards in terms of "Traffic and Road Conditions, General Prices for Goods and Services, Future Use of Forests, Noise, Litter, Air Quality, and Occurrences of Crime" had worsened.

== Arts and culture ==
=== Local culture ===
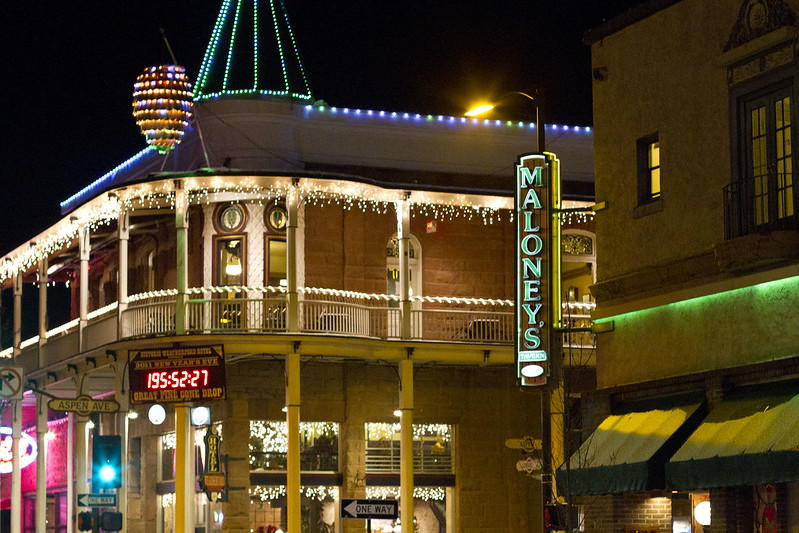
Weatherford Hotel with its pine cone and a countdown in December 2010

Flagstaff has its own New Year's Eve tradition; in the city, people gather around the Weatherford Hotel as a 70-pound (32 kg), 6-foot (1.8 m) tall, metallic pine cone is dropped from the roof at midnight. The tradition originated in 1999, when Henry Taylor and Sam Green (owners of the hotel), decorated a garbage can with paint, lights, and pine cones, and dropped it from the roof of their building to mark the new millennium. By 2003 the event had become tradition, and the current metallic pine cone was designed and built by Frank Mayorga of Mayorga Welding in the city.

Local museums include the Museum of Northern Arizona, which features displays of the biology, archeology, photography, anthropology, and native art of the Colorado Plateau, and the Arboretum at Flagstaff, a 200-acre (81 ha) arboretum containing 2,500 species of drought-tolerant native plants representative of the high desert region.

A lot of the local culture is also focused on Route 66, which originally ran between Chicago and Los Angeles, greatly increased the accessibility to the area, and enhanced the culture and tourism in Flagstaff. Route 66 remains a historic route, passing through the city between Barstow, California, and Albuquerque, New Mexico. In early September, the city hosts an annual event, Route 66 Days, to highlight its connection to the famous highway.

=== Dark Sky City ===
Flagstaff takes one of its nicknames from its designation as the world's first International Dark Sky City, with deliberate measures to reduce light pollution beginning in 1958 supported by the environmentally-aware population and community advocates, government and elected officials, and the assistance of observatories in the area – including the United States Naval Observatory Flagstaff Station and Lowell Observatory.

The city's designation as an International Dark Sky City was on October 24, 2001, by the International Dark-Sky Association, after a proposal by the Flagstaff Dark Skies Coalition to start the recognition program. It is seen as a world precedent in dark sky preservation. Before this, it had been nicknamed the "Skylight City" in the 1890s, the same decade that the Lowell Observatory was founded. In 1958, it passed Ordinance 400, which outlawed using large or powerful searchlights within city limits. In the 1980s a series of measures were introduced for the city and Coconino County, and the Dark Sky Coalition was founded in 1999 by Chris Luginbuhl and Lance Diskan. Luginbuhl is a former U.S. Naval astronomer, and Diskan had originally moved to Flagstaff from Los Angeles so that his children could grow up able to see stars, saying that "part of being human is looking up at the stars and being awestruck." It was reported that even though greater restrictions on types of public lighting were introduced in 1989, requiring them all to be low-emission, some public buildings like gas stations hadn't updated by 2002, after the Dark Sky designation.

Flagstaff and the surrounding area is split into four zones, each permitted different levels of light emissions. The highest restrictions are in south and west Flagstaff (near NAU and its observatory), and at the Naval, Braeside, and Lowell Observatories. Photographs detecting emissions taken in 2017 show that Flagstaff's light is 14 times less than another Western city of comparable size, Cheyenne, Wyoming, which Luginbuhl described as "even better than [they] might have expected".

=== Arts ===
Flagstaff has an active cultural scene. The city is home to the Flagstaff Symphony Orchestra, which plays concerts from September through April at Ardrey Auditorium on the NAU campus. The city also attracts folk and contemporary acoustic musicians, and offers several annual music festivals during the summer months, such as the Flagstaff Friends of Traditional Music Festival, the Flagstaff Music Festival, and Pickin' in the Pines, a three-day bluegrass and acoustic music festival held at the Pine Mountain Amphitheater at Fort Tuthill Fairgrounds. Popular bands play throughout the year at the Orpheum Theater, and free concerts are held during the summer months at Heritage Square.

Beyond music, Flagstaff has a popular theater scene, featuring several groups. Northern Arizona University's Department of Theatre produces productions for the community as well as the campus. The department has won awards, including multiple invitations to the American College Theatre Festival. NAU Theatre performs in two facilities: the Clifford E. White Theatre (named for long-time professor Clifford E. White) and the Studio Theatre. Both facilities are housed in the Fine and Performing Arts Building on campus. A local community theater company called Theatrikos was founded in 1972 in the basement of the Weatherford Hotel, and today puts on six major productions per year. In 2002, the company moved into a new venue now known as the Doris-Harper White Community Playhouse, a downtown building which was built in 1923 as an Elks Lodge and later became the Flagstaff library. Since 1995, the Flagstaff Light Opera Company has performed a variety of musical theater and light opera productions throughout the year at the Sinagua Middle School auditorium. There are several dance companies in Flagstaff, including Coconino Community College Dance Program, Northern Arizona Preparatory Company and Canyon Movement, which present periodic concerts and collaborate with the Flagstaff Symphony for free concerts during the summer and holiday seasons.

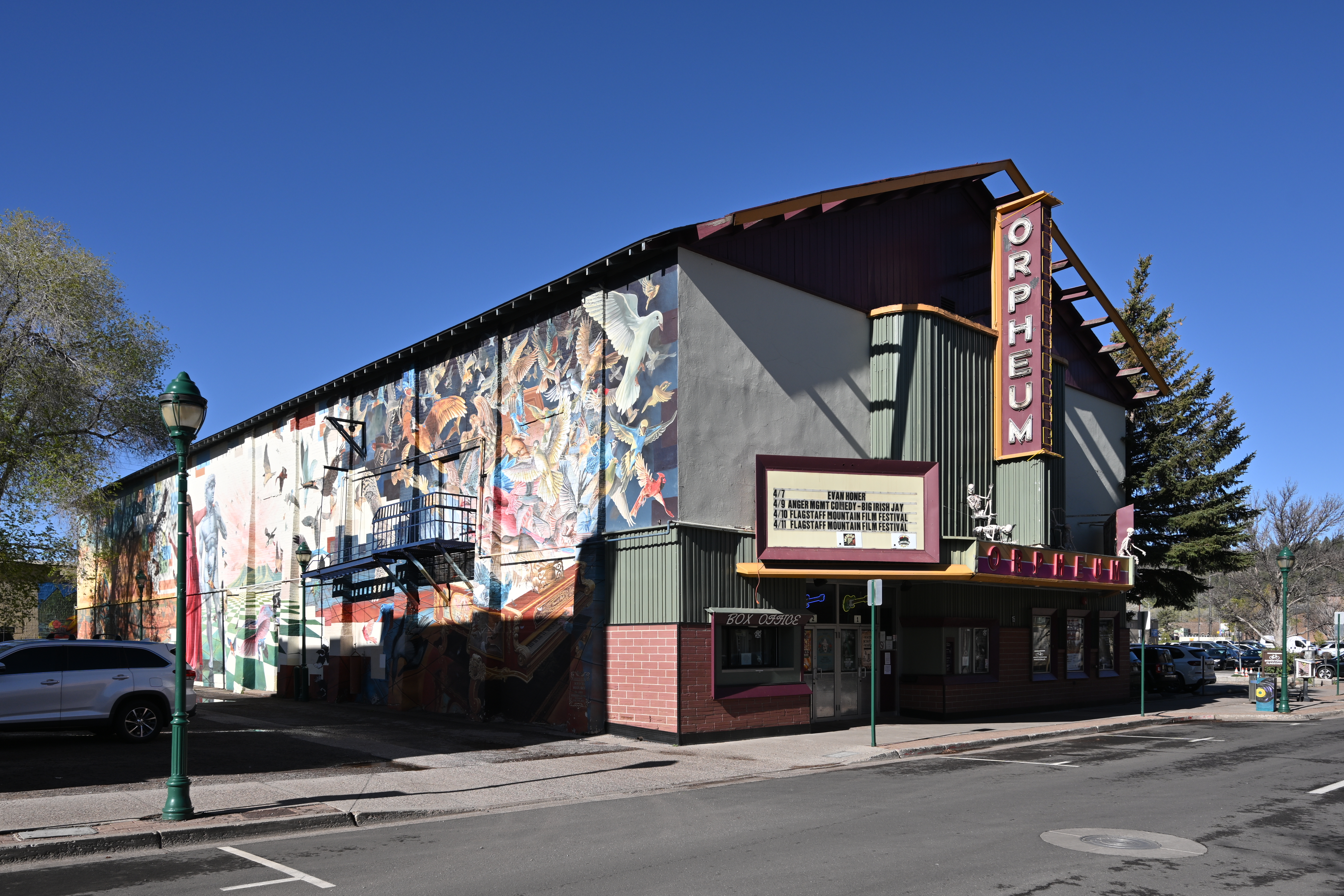
Orpheum Theater where the Flagstaff Mountain Film Festival screenings are held

A variety of weekend festivals occur throughout the year. The annual Northern Arizona Book Festival, held in the spring, brings together authors to read and display their works. The Flagstaff Mountain Film Festival is held every October, and features a variety of independent films and documentaries focusing on extreme sports, environmental issues, and global topics. The festival is four days long and consists of several sessions of films. The screenings are held at the Orpheum Theater in the historic downtown area. The summer months feature several festivals, including Hopi and Navajo Festivals of Arts and Crafts, the Arizona Highland Celtic Festival, Pride in the Pines, and the Made in the Shade Beer Tasting Festival. For more than 20 years Flagstaff has hosted the 10-day Flagstaff Festival of Science in September. It is a family event which features open houses, lectures, informal talks, and hands-on activities at area museums, observatories, other scientific facilities, and the university. In-school programs also are an important part of the festival. The festival begins with the annual Eugene Shoemaker keynote address. Guest speakers have included famous astronauts, arctic explorers, storm chasers, and scientists from many disciplines. The Coconino County Fair is held every September at the Fort Tuthill County Fairgrounds, featuring a demolition derby, livestock auction, carnival rides, and other activities.

=== Historic districts and properties ===
Flagstaff is home to seven National Register of Historic Places historic districts: Southside, Townsite, Fort Tuthill, North End, Northern Arizona Normal School, the Railroad Addition, and USFS Fort Valley Experimental Forest Station, as well as a variety of many other structures and areas. The Lowell Observatory is a National Historic Landmark.

== Sports ==
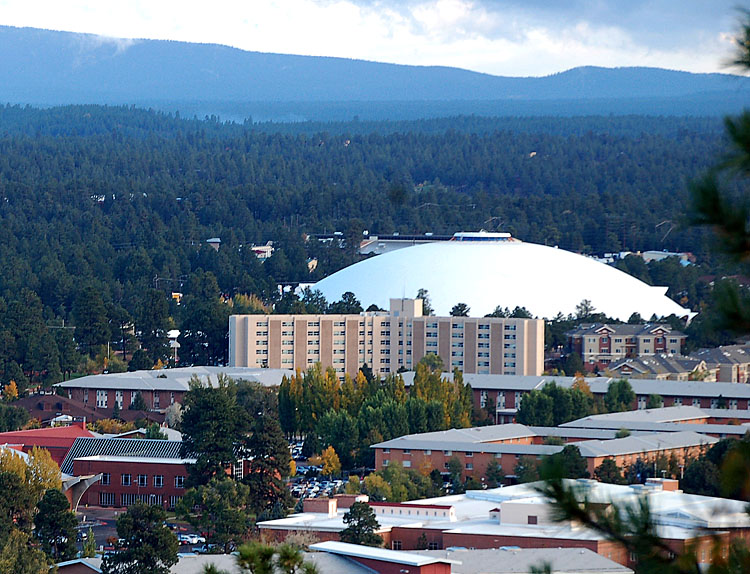
Northern Arizona University's Walkup Skydome and central campus

Flagstaff has no professional sports of its own, but is home to the college sports teams of Northern Arizona University. It is a popular training destination for a variety of sports, largely due to its altitude and climate.

=== Northern Arizona Lumberjacks ===
Northern Arizona University sponsors 15 sports at the NCAA Division I level, including a football team that competes at the Division I Football Championship Subdivision level. The NAU football team has a rivalry with the Southern Utah Thunderbirds, known as the Grand Canyon Rivalry, based on the universities residing on opposite sides of the Grand Canyon. All sports are members of the Big Sky Conference with the exception of the Women's Swimming & Diving team, which competes in the Western Athletic Conference. The Men's Cross Country team has featured four straight top ten finishes at the NCAA Division I Cross Country championships. The track and field team has been home to several All-Americans, including NCAA Champion and Olympian Lopez Lomong (and brother Peter Lomong), two-time NCAA Champion David McNeill, and 2012 Olympian Diego Estrada.

=== Arizona Cardinals ===
From 1988 to 2012 (with the exception of the 2005 season), the Arizona Cardinals of the National Football League held their summer training camp at Northern Arizona University. The 2005 training camp relocated to Prescott because of a norovirus outbreak at the university that emerged from a summer wrestling training camp and infected over 100 people. The NAU training camp was named as one of the top five training camps in the NFL by Sports Illustrated, citing the cooler temperature, scenic area, and the possibility for fans to get close to athletes as key points. Players have said that the altitude of Flagstaff was the key benefit, as well as seeing the dedication of fans traveling to the city, but that they did not enjoy living in the NAU dorm rooms.

The Cardinals left Flagstaff in summer 2013, placing NAU at fault after the team was put in the visitors' facilities, though NAU had offered the home facilities when the concern was raised, and moved their training camp to State Farm Stadium in Glendale. At Glendale, they train in a domed stadium rather than outside, (Note: While NAU's flagship facility is the Walkup Skydome, the Cardinals also trained on their outdoor football fields.) which player Bertrand Berry said took away some of the feeling of training camp, saying "there really isn't that need to practice outside when most of the games are inside, but when you talk about building a team and going through adverse situations and bonding together, I think they miss out on a little bit of that". The Cardinals had trained at NAU since the franchise moved to Arizona, with Fox Sports reporting that "some argued they pulled the plug on the team's only Arizona tradition". Bill Bidwill, owner of the Cardinals, was inducted into the Flagstaff Sports Foundation's Hall of Fame in 2009, after bringing the team and resultant tourism boost to the city for over 20 years.

=== Altitude training destination ===
Flagstaff is also a popular destination for altitude training. The first elite athletes to start altitude training in the city were those going to the 1968 Summer Olympics in Mexico City. A 2009 analysis showed that groups of 35 athletes spent three to eight weeks training in Flagstaff, to positive effect. This was one of the highest number of athletes and longest periods among seventeen sites used in the research. Australian rules football team Collingwood Magpies regularly train at NAU facilities, as does the Olympic-medal-winning Team GB British Swimming team. Another British Olympian, Mo Farah, trains in Flagstaff.

Long-distance runner Andrea Seccafien used to altitude train in Flagstaff but moved to Australia in 2018, saying "We don't go to Flagstaff or St. Moritz anymore which are more populated by runners and the general public. [...] Flagstaff feels quite metropolitan compared to where we are now"; the Canadian Running Magazine noted that the city becomes host to many professional runners in the spring. The popularity among runners is because of the altitude and pleasant climate, making it "for distance runners [...] a practically unparalleled paradise", known as the "running mecca". Runner Nick Hilton said that "Flagstaff and Boulder, Colorado, are probably the two biggest centers for elite distance runners in the country".

The HYPO2 altitude training center in the city is used by swimmers and runners alike, and is an elite facility that attracts many teams from around the world. HYPO2 was created in 2012, largely with staff from NAU's Center for High Altitude Training, which closed in 2009. As of 2019, over 85 Olympic medalists from 44 countries trained at the facility. In 2016, the city advertised NAU and the HYPO2 with promotions saying "The Road to Rio Runs Through Flagstaff", prominently noting that if Flagstaff (with its training athletes) was a country, it would be in the top 10 of Olympic-medal winning nations since 1996.

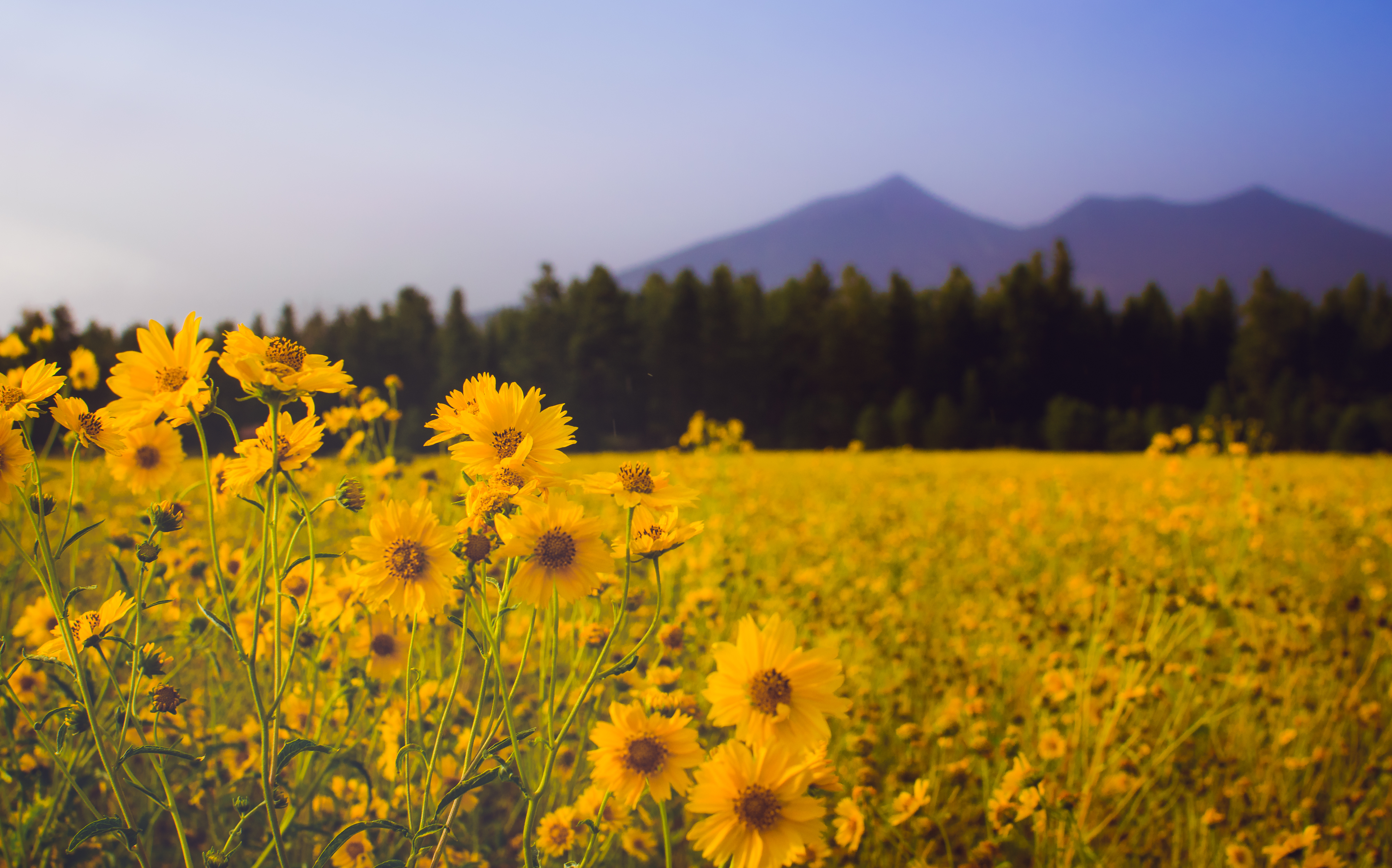
San Francisco Mountains

== Parks and recreation ==
Flagstaff has acquired a reputation as a magnet for outdoor enthusiasts, and the region's varied terrain, high elevation, and amenable weather attract campers, backpackers, climbers, recreation and elite runners, and mountain bikers from throughout the southwestern United States. There are 679.2 acres (274.9 ha) of city parks in Flagstaff, the largest of which are Thorpe Park and Buffalo Park. Wheeler Park, next to city hall, is the location of summer concerts and other events.

The Flagstaff Urban Trails System (FUTS) is a citywide network of shared-use, non-motorized paths for walking, cycling, running and other activities. According to the City of Flagstaff, the system has about 59 miles (95 km) of trails; roughly half are paved and half have a hard-packed aggregate surface. The city's master plan depicts about 75 miles (121 km) of future trails toward a planned network of roughly 130 miles (210 km). The paths link neighborhoods with schools, parks, workplaces, shopping areas and the surrounding national forest. The city council adopted an Active Transportation Master Plan on November 1, 2022, to guide improvements to walking, cycling and trails. The Arizona Trail (800 miles or 1,300km long) also passes through the city on an urban route that follows parts of the Flagstaff Urban Trails System.

The area is a recreational hub for road cycling and mountain biking clubs, organized triathlon events, and annual cross country ski races. Several major river running operators are headquartered in Flagstaff, and the city serves as a base for Grand Canyon and Colorado River expeditions.

Flagstaff's proximity to Grand Canyon National Park, about 75 miles (121 km) north of the city, has made it a popular tourist destination since the mid-19th century. Other nearby outdoor attractions include Walnut Canyon National Monument, Sunset Crater Volcano National Monument, Wupatki National Monument, and Barringer Crater. Farther south, Oak Canyon and the red rock landscape around Sedona lie along the U.S. route 89A. Glen Canyon National Recreation Area and Lake Powell are both about 135 mi (217 km) north along U.S. Route 89.

== Government ==
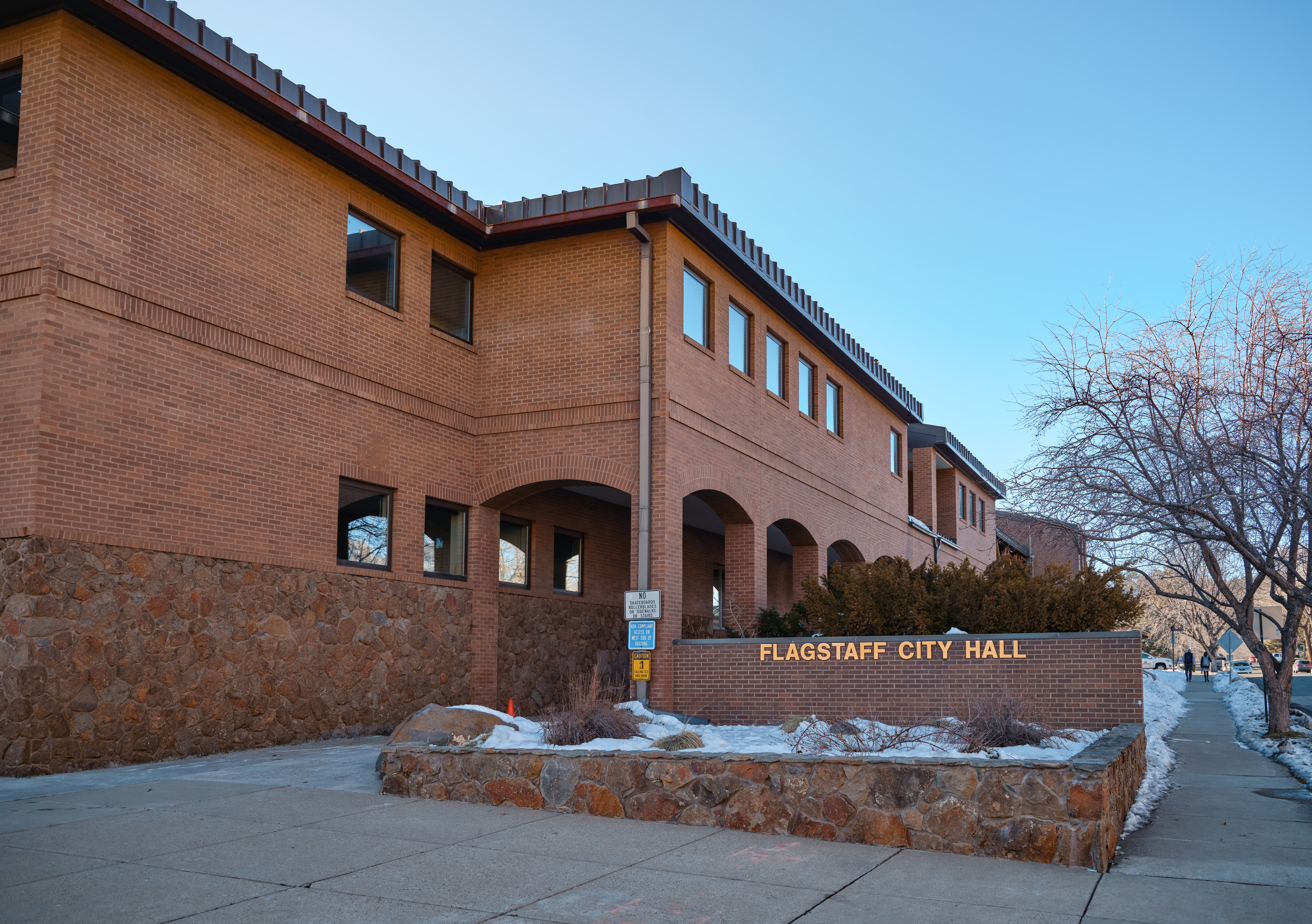
Flagstaff City Hall

City seal

The city government is organized under a council–manager form of government. The mayor of Flagstaff is Becky Daggett, who was elected in November 2022. The town council consists of the mayor and six councilmembers: Austin Aslan (vice mayor), Jim McCarthy, Miranda Sweet, Lori Matthews, Deborah Harris, and Khara House (appointed as an interim councilmember in May 2022). On July 2, 2019, the city council named Greg Clifton as city manager among 50 candidates. Regular meetings of the city council are held on the first and third Tuesday of every month. The last mayoral election occurred in November 2022.

At the state level, Flagstaff is in the 6th legislative district. In the Arizona State Senate, the 6th is represented by Wendy Rogers (R) of Flagstaff. In the House of Representatives, the 6th is represented by Brenda Barton (R) of Payson and Walter Blackman (R) of Snowflake.

At the federal level, Flagstaff was redistricted in 2023 within Arizona's 2nd congressional district, covering 20,219 sq. miles. The current 2nd is essentially the successor of what was Arizona's 1st congressional district from 2003 to 2023. The district is represented by Eli Crane (R) of Oro Valley.

The City of Flagstaff raised its minimum wage above the State minimum wage in 2017. This wage increase was the result of a ballot measure – Proposition 414 – on the November 8, 2016, ballot. The City Council of Flagstaff then passed Title 15 of the City Ordinance, which provided for implementation of the new law. The new minimum wage in Flagstaff on July 1, 2017, was $10.50, fifty cents more than the Arizona state minimum wage. On January 1, 2021, the minimum wage rose to $15.00.

In 2023, the city prohibited gun range companies from airing ads at the airport, but upon accusations of First Amendment violations, subsequently banned all ads besides city ads. Although some say this poses other Constitutional issues since commercial speech has protection under the Central Hudson Doctrine.

== Education ==
The north campus area of NAU, showing the Science and Health buildings (center) and the Liberal Arts building (bottom right)

There are 15 public schools, with 11,500 students and 800 faculty and staff, in the Flagstaff Unified School District. In 1997, Mount Elden Middle School was named an A+ School, citing an outstanding school climate, progressive use of technology and zero-tolerance approach to discipline. The 1999 National Science Teacher of the Year, David Thompson, teaches physics at Coconino High School. Three Arizona Teachers of the Year from 2001 through 2003 teach at Flagstaff High School. In 2012, Flagstaff was named America's first STEM Community.

In addition to the numerous public schools, there are several charter schools operating in the Flagstaff area including Flagstaff Junior Academy, Northland Preparatory Academy (ranked No. 52 in US News's America's Top 100 Best High Schools), the Flagstaff Arts and Leadership Academy, Pine Forest Charter School, BASIS Flagstaff (ranked No. 2 in The Washington Post's America's Most Challenging High Schools) and the Montessori Schools of Flagstaff.

Flagstaff is home to three institutions of higher education, Northern Arizona University (one of the three public state universities in Arizona); Coconino Community College; and Flagstaff College (a very small upper-division college with only one major – sustainability and social justice).

== Media ==
The major daily newspaper in Flagstaff is the Arizona Daily Sun. Northern Arizona University's weekly newspaper The Lumberjack also covers Flagstaff news, while the other publications that serve the city include weeklies Flagstaff Live and the Navajo Hopi Observer, and monthlies Mountain Living Magazine and The Noise. NAU runs several radio stations including KNAU and KPUB and their translator stations, which provide NPR and PRI news coverage, as well as classical music.

Flagstaff is included in the Phoenix Designated market area (DMA), the 13th largest in the U.S. Over-the-air television service is provided mostly by low-powered repeaters of the Phoenix stations. There are two local broadcast television stations serving the city, KNAZ-2 (NBC), and KFPH-13 (UniMás). In reality television, Extreme Makeover: Home Edition built a home just outside Flagstaff for slain soldier Lori Piestewa's two children and parents in 2005. In December 2007, talk show hostess Ellen DeGeneres selected Flagstaff as the winner of her show's "Wish You Were Here" contest.

=== Film production ===
In the early 20th century, the city was considered as a site for the film The Squaw Man by Jesse Lasky and Cecil B. DeMille, but was abandoned in favor of Hollywood. During the 1940s and 1950s, over 100 Westerns was filmed in Sedona and Oak Creek Canyon. The Hotel Monte Vista in Flagstaff hosted many film stars during this era, including Jane Russell, Gary Cooper, Spencer Tracy, John Wayne, and Bing Crosby. A scene from the movie Casablanca was filmed in one of the rooms of the hotel.

Several films then used Flagstaff's Route 66 in scenes: the 1969 film Easy Rider were filmed on Milton Road and Route 66 as well as near Sunset Crater; a moment in the film National Lampoon's Vacation was filmed at a truck stop gas station near Little America Hotel in 1983; a small scene in Midnight Run was filmed in Flagstaff at the train depot, and the city was referenced in the film; several of the running scenes in Forrest Gump were filmed in and around the area, including a memorable scene in which Forrest is seen jogging in downtown Flagstaff and gives inspiration to a bumper sticker designer; parts of 2007 Academy Award winner Little Miss Sunshine were filmed at the junction of I-40 and I-17 in Flagstaff; and Terminal Velocity was partially filmed in the city. Grizzly Peak Films also filmed Sasquatch Mountain, a feature-length film for the Science Fiction Channel about a Yeti, in Flagstaff and Williams.

== Infrastructure ==
=== Transportation ===
==== Road ====
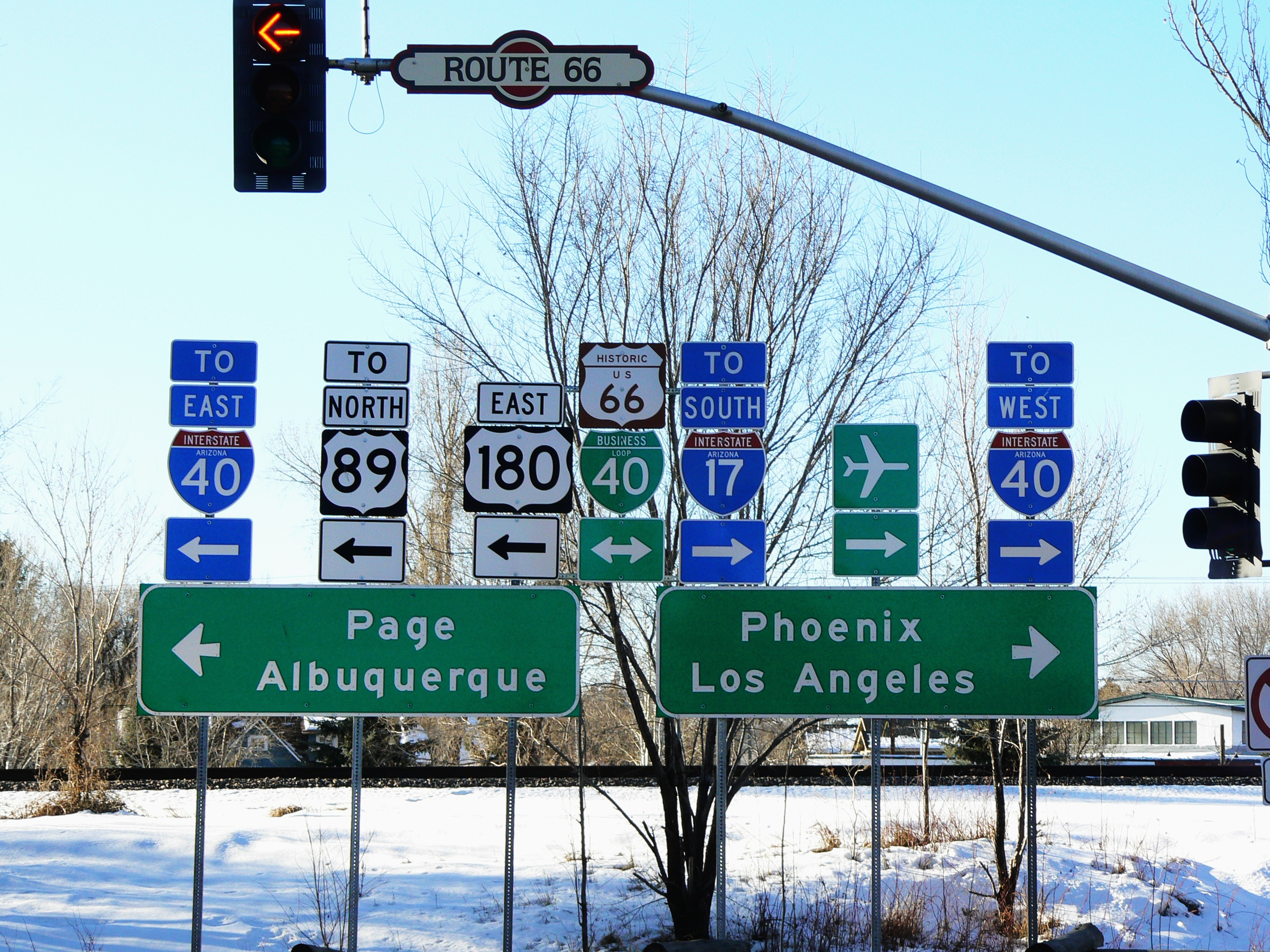
Road signs in downtown Flagstaff

The city is connected to Phoenix by Interstate 17 (I-17), and to Los Angeles, Las Vegas (via Route 93), and Albuquerque by Interstate 40 (I-40). Page can be reached via Route 89 from the city, as can Salt Lake City and, ultimately, Canada. The main road through Flagstaff is Route 66/Santa Fe Avenue, which runs parallel to the Burlington Northern Santa Fe (BNSF) Railway line east–west through the city. Downtown Flagstaff and the surrounding neighborhoods are separated from East Flagstaff by Buffalo Park, with the city connected by Route 66 and I-40. Route 66 is connected to the interstates in downtown by Milton Road, running roughly south alongside the NAU campus; Milton Road then merges into I-17. Flagstaff is connected to Sedona and Prescott by State Route 89A, which Beulah Boulevard merges into, and to the Grand Canyon by Route 180, which Fort Valley Road merges into just northwest of the city. It is the northern terminus of I-17 and Route 89A, and the southern terminus of Route 89.

Several towns are close to Flagstaff along I-40 and I-17. Approximately 6 miles (9.7 km) south are the small urban areas of Kachina Village (west of I-17) and Mountainaire (east of I-17; 2 miles (3.2 km)). (Note: Kachina Village and Mountainaire are within Flagstaff city limits under the Flagstaff southern urban areas.) About 35 miles (56 km) to the west is Williams, 20 miles (32 km) to the south is Munds Park, and 30 miles (48 km) to the south on Route 89A is Sedona. 15 miles (24 km) to the east of Flagstaff is the town of Winona.

From the city, Amtrak provides connecting Amtrak Thruway service via Open Road Tours, which has an office inside the rail depot. Local bus service is provided throughout the city by the Mountain Line. Interstate bus service is provided by Greyhound Lines and Flixbus. Groome Transportation provides in-state shuttle service. Bus service to the Hopi Reservation is provided by Hopi Senom Transit, and to Tuba City and the Navajo Nation by Navajo Transit. Flagstaff is served by Navajo Transit Route 11 from Birdsprings to Tuba City.

==== Rail ====
The major rail corridor running through Flagstaff is the Southern Transcon, originally built by the Santa Fe Railroad and now owned and operated by the BNSF Railway. Passenger rail service is provided by Amtrak at the downtown Flagstaff station, connecting on east–west routes to Los Angeles and Albuquerque via the Southwest Chief line.

==== Air ====
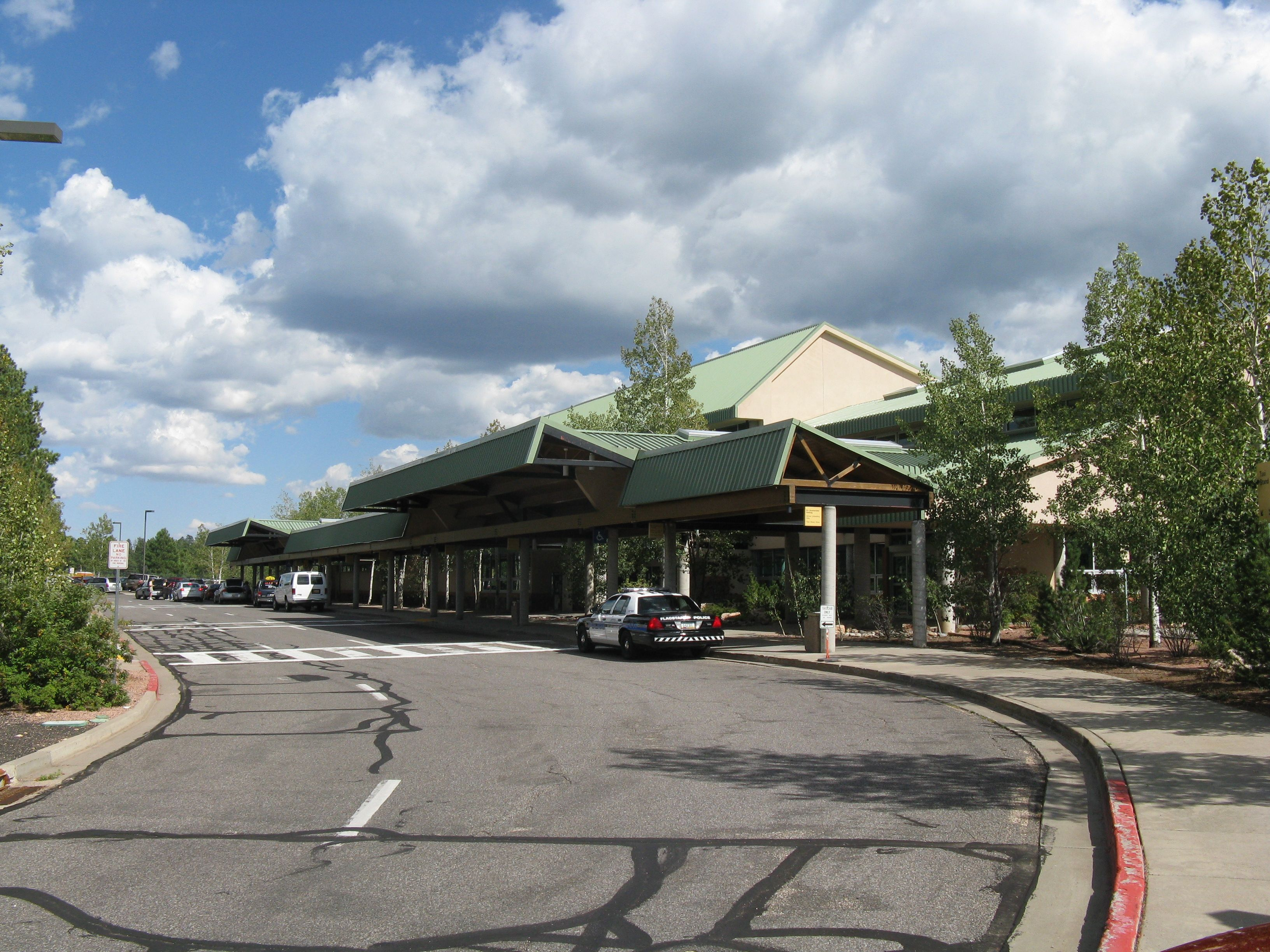
Flagstaff airport

Air travel is available through Flagstaff Pulliam Airport (IATA: FLG, ICAO: KFLG, FAA LID: FLG), just south of the city. The airport is primarily a small, general aviation airport with a single 6,999-foot (2,133 m) runway. The airport finished a major expansion project to add 1,800 feet (550 m) to the north end of the runway and lengthen the taxiway in 2007. The primary purpose of the project was to increase its viability for commercial and regional jets. As of January 2023, the airport offers year-round direct flights to Phoenix Sky Harbor International Airport and Dallas-Fort Worth International Airport on American Airlines.

==== Cycle ====
Flagstaff is fairly bike-friendly; there are bike lanes on many major streets, and the Flagstaff Urban Trails System (FUTS) includes more than 50 miles of off-street trails that wind throughout the community. In 2006 Flagstaff was designated a Bicycle-Friendly Community by the League of American Bicyclists. About nine percent of trips in Flagstaff are made by bicycle.

=== Utilities ===
Electricity generation in Flagstaff is provided by Arizona Public Service, an electric utility subsidiary operated by parent company Pinnacle West. The primary generating station near Flagstaff is the coal-fired, 995-MW Cholla Power Plant, near Holbrook, which uses coal from the McKinley Mine in New Mexico. Near Page is the coal-fired, 750-MW Navajo Power Plant, supplied by an electric railroad that delivers coal from a mine on the Navajo and Hopi reservations in northern Arizona. Flagstaff is also home to Arizona's first commercial solar power generating station, which was built in 1997 and provides 87 kW of electricity. Combined with 16 other solar power locations in Arizona, the system provides over 5 MW of electricity statewide.

Drinking water in Flagstaff is produced from conventional surface water treatment at the Lake Mary Water Treatment Plant, on Upper Lake Mary, as well as from springs at the inner basin of the San Francisco Peaks. Groundwater from several water wells throughout the city and surrounding area provide additional sources of drinking water. Water and wastewater services are provided by the City of Flagstaff.

Natural gas is provided by UniSource Energy Services. CenturyLink QC is the incumbent local exchange carrier. Cable television service is offered by Suddenlink Communications.

=== Health care ===
In 1936, Charles Sechrist opened the city's first hospital. The city's primary hospital is the 267-bed Flagstaff Medical Center, on the north side of downtown Flagstaff. The hospital serves as the major regional trauma center for northern Arizona.

== Sister cities ==
Flagstaff's sister cities are:

- Blue Mountains, New South Wales, Australia
- Manzanillo, Colima, Mexico
- Navojoa, Mexico
