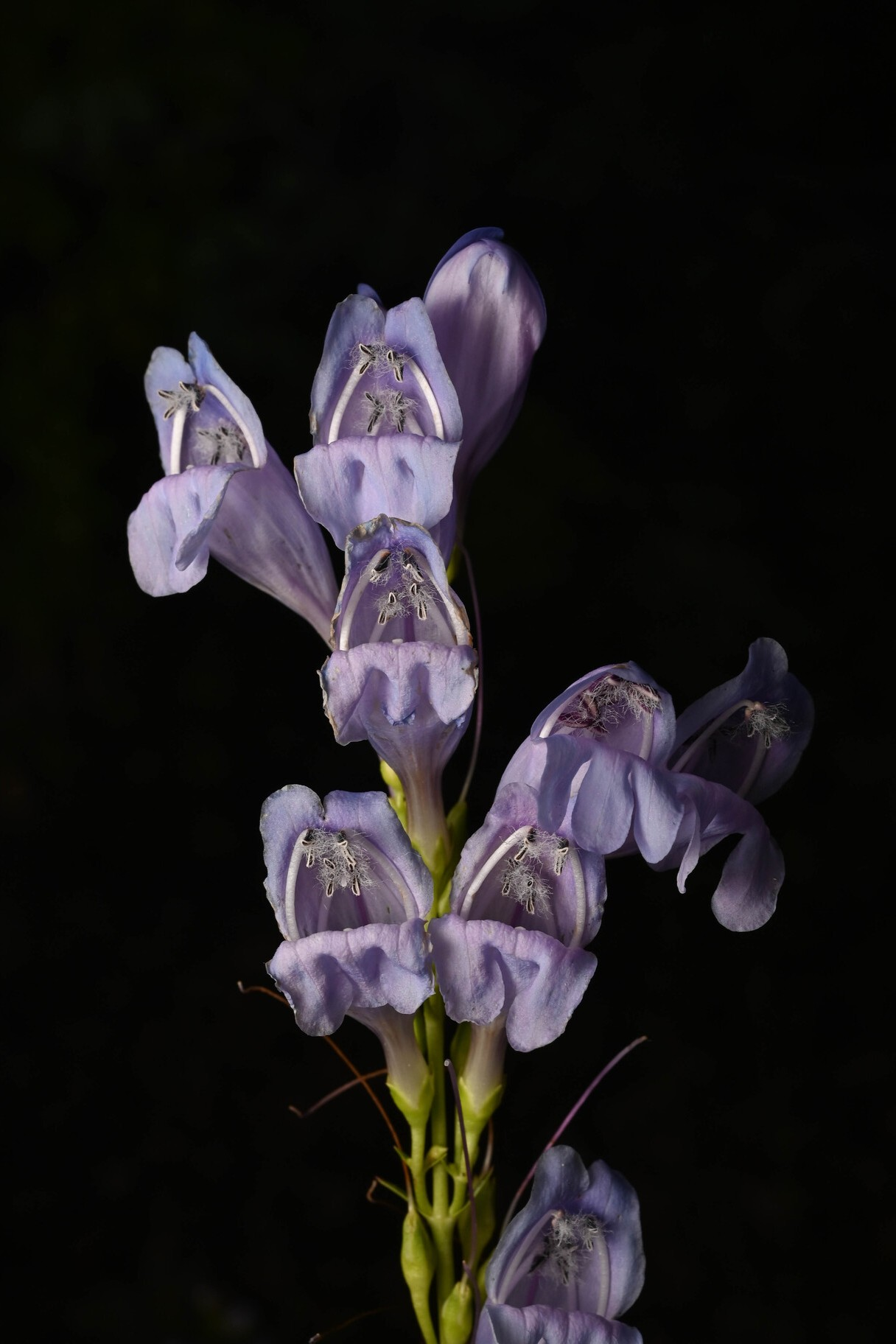
- In Mesa County, Colorado

Conservation status
- Secure (NatureServe)

Scientific classification
- Kingdom: Plantae
- Clade: Embryophytes
- Clade: Tracheophytes
- Clade: Spermatophytes
- Clade: Angiosperms
- Clade: Eudicots
- Clade: Asterids
- Order: Lamiales
- Family: Plantaginaceae
- Genus: Penstemon
- Species: P. comarrhenus

Binomial name
- Penstemon comarrhenus A.Gray

= Penstemon comarrhenus =

Plant species in the veronica family

Penstemon comarrhenus (dusty penstemon or dusty beardtongue) is a perennial plant in the plantain family (Plantaginaceae) found in the Colorado Plateau and Canyonlands region of the southwestern United States.

== Description ==
Penstemon comarrhenus is a herbaceous plant with stems that either grow straight upwards or out a short distance before curving to grow upwards. They usually reach 40 to 80 centimeters (1.3 to 2.6 ft) in height, but may be as short as 18 cm (7 in) or as tall as 120 cm (3.9 ft) when full grown. Plants may have a single stem or multiple stems and are usually hairless, but on occasion will be puberulent, covered in very fine and short hairs, low down on the plant.

=== Leaves ===
Plants have both basal and cauline leaves, those that grow directly from the base of the plant or are attached to the stems. Most often are hairless or have a sparse covering of retrorse, backwards facing, hairs, but on occasion they may be quite hairy. The basal leaves and the ones lowest on the stems are 4 to 12 centimeters long, but usually no longer than 8 cm. They are 0.7 to 3 cm wide, though most often less than 2 cm. Their shape varies from obovate to oblanceolate, like a teardrop or a reversed spear head with the narrower part towards the plant. The lower leaves are attached by petioles while those higher up on the plant attach directly to the stem and become more narrow and grass like as well.

=== Inflorescence and fruit ===
The inflorescence tends to have all of its flowers facing one direction. It typically makes up the top 15 to 32 centimeters of the stem, though occasionally they are as short as 12 cm. There are six to twelve groups of flowers attached to the inflorescence each with two bracts and two cymes. Each cyme may have up to five flowers, though usually just one or two. Each flower is pale white blue, blue tinted slightly pink, or lavender with violet nectar guides. They are 25 to 38 millimeters long. The staminode does not extend out of the flower and is hairless or only has a few sparse hairs. They bloom as early as June and as late as August.

Fruits are small capsules 7 to 15 millimeters in length.

== Taxonomy ==
The scientific description and name of Penstemon comarrhenus was published by Asa Gray in 1877. It is classified in the genus Penstemon as part of the family Plantaginaceae. It has no synonyms or lower taxonomic divisions.

=== Names ===
The species name, comarrhenus, is a compound of the words for hair and male, referring to very hairy anthers. In English it is known by the common names dusty penstemon or dusty beardtongue.

== Range and habitat ==
The native range of the Dusty penstemon extends across five US states in the southwest. In Colorado it grows only the far western side of the state from Garfield County southwards to the Four Corners. In New Mexico it is found in the northwestern corner of the state in San Juan and Rio Arriba counties. The Arizonan range is in the north while it extends across the southern half of Utah. West of this it is only recorded in Lincoln County, Nevada.

It can be found in pinyon juniper woodland, mountain brush, ponderosa pine forest, and Douglas fir and aspen forest communities, typically on sandy or gravelly soils.

=== Conservation ===
Penstemon comarrhenus was evaluated by NatureServe in 1984 and rated as secure (G5). At the state level it was rated as vulnerable (S3) in New Mexico and critically imperiled (S1) in Nevada. The rest of its range has not been evaluated.

== Ecology ==
Bees are the primary pollinator. The pollen wasp Pseudomasaris vespoides visits the flowers.

== See also ==
- List of Penstemon species
