= Mountain Line =

Mountain Line may refer to:

- Mountain railway, a railway that operates in a mountainous region
- Mountain Line (Arizona), a bus service in Flagstaff, Arizona, U.S.
- Mountain Line (Montana), a public transport system in Missoula, Montana, U.S.
- Mountain Line Transit Authority, in Morgantown, West Virginia, U.S.
- Taichung line, or Mountain line, in Taiwan
