= Flagstaff Medical Center =

Regional hospital in Coconino County, Arizona

- Northern Arizona Healthcare
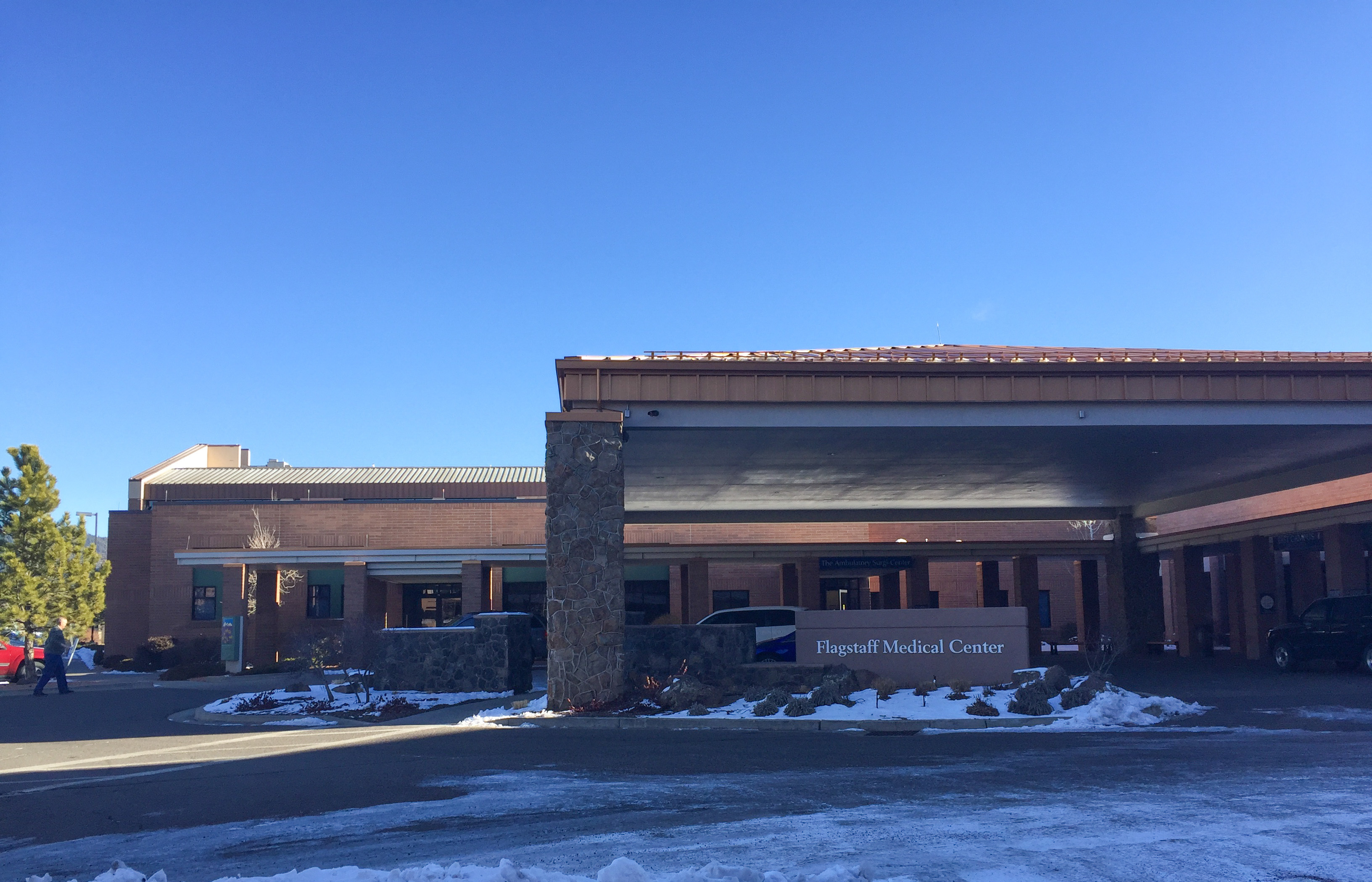
- Flagstaff Medical Center main entrance, January 2018

Geography
- Location: 1200 North Beaver Street, Flagstaff, Arizona 86001, United States
- Coordinates: 35°12′30″N 111°38′38″W

Services
- Emergency department: Level I Trauma Center

Helipads
- Helipad: FAA LID: 3AZ0
Number	Length		Surface
Number	ft	m	Surface
H1	40 x 40	12 × 12	mats, aluminum mat.

History
- Opened: 1936 (90 years ago)

Links
- Website: www.nahealth.com
- Lists: Hospitals in the United States

Flagstaff Medical Center is a major regional hospital in Flagstaff, Arizona. The hospital was founded in 1936 by Dr. Charles Sechrist as Flagstaff Hospital, with 25 beds, and was donated to the community of Flagstaff in 1955.

Though the hospital failed verification by the American College of Surgeons in August 2024, the hospital is still designated a Level I Trauma Center by the Arizona Department of Health Services.

As of 2007, the hospital has a staff of 190 physicians and 270 inpatient beds.
