= Mountain Line (Arizona) =

Municipal bus system in Flagstaff, Arizona

- Parent: Northern Arizona Intergovernmental Public Transportation Authority
- Founded: 2001
- Headquarters: 3773 N. Kaspar Dr.
- Locale: Flagstaff, AZ
- Service area: Transit
- Service type: bus service
- Routes: 9
- Hubs: Downtown Transfer Center and Flagstaff Mall
- Fuel type: Hybrid diesel and electric
- Website: mountainline.az.gov

The Mountain Line provides fixed route public transportation bus service in the Flagstaff area of Coconino County, Arizona. It started in 2001 as NAIPTA, replacing the county-run Pine Country Transit.

== Routes ==
There are nine routes currently in service (2, 3, 4, 5, 7, 8, 10, 14 and 66). Every route currently in service interchanges at the Downtown Connection Center, located on W. Phoenix Ave at S. Mikes Pike. Additionally, three routes (2, 3, and 66) interchange at the Flagstaff Mall Connection Center, located behind the mall at Marketplace Dr./Mall Way.

Routes currently in service:

- Route 2 (Blue Line) – Downtown to Flagstaff Mall via Flagstaff Medical Center, Cedar/Lockett
- Route 3 (Green Line) – Downtown to Flagstaff Mall via Butler/Soliere/Country Club
- Route 4 (Gold Line) – Downtown to Milton/Beulah/Lake Mary Rd/Lone Tree (CCC) - (Runs circle counterclockwise to Rt 14)
- Route 5 (Orange Line) – Downtown to Cheshire via Flagstaff Medical Center
- Route 7 (Purple Line) – Downtown to Sunnyside via Butler/Huntington/Fourth Street
- Route 8 (Teal Line) – Downtown to Woodlands Village via historic Rt 66
- Route 10 (Maroon Line) – Downtown Connection Center to Woodlands Village via Northern Arizona University
- Route 14 (Brown Line) – Downtown to Lone Tree (CCC)/Lake Mary Rd/Beulah/Milton - (Runs circle counterclockwise to Rt 4)
- Route 66 (Red Line) – Downtown to Flagstaff Mall via Rt 66/Christmas Tree Estates
