= Stoneman Lake, Arizona =

Populated place in Coconino County, Arizona

- Populated place
- Location within the state of Arizona Stoneman Lake (the United States)
- Coordinates: 34°46′53″N 111°30′46″W
- Country: United States
- State: Arizona
- County: Coconino
- Elevation: 6,782 ft (2,067 m)
- Time zone: UTC-7 (Mountain (MST))
  - Summer (DST): UTC-7 (MST)
- Area code: 928
- FIPS code: 04-69830
- GNIS feature ID: 34873

Stoneman Lake is a populated place situated in Coconino County, Arizona, United States.
