= Douglas fir and aspen forest =

Plant community in western United States

Douglas fir and aspen forest is a plant community or vegetation type of the mountains of the western United States, dominated by Douglas fir (Pseudotsuga menziesii) and Quaking aspen (Populus tremuloides).
