= Snow (surname) =

Snow or Snowe is an English surname.

Notable people with the surname include:

- Al Snow (born 1963), American professional wrestler
- Adam Snow, 21st-century American record producer
- Aurora Snow, 21st-century American porn star
- Ben Snow, 21st-century Australian special effects artist
- Brittany Snow (born 1986), American film and television actress
- C. P. Snow (1905–1980), British physicist and novelist
- Chester Snow (1881–1970), American applied mathematician and physicist
- Dan Snow (born 1978), British historian and television presenter
- Dash Snow (1981–2009), American visual artist
- Dave Snow, 20th-century American college baseball coach
- Derick Snow, 21st-century American voice actor
- Don Snow (born 1957), British musician
- Edgar Snow (1905–1972), American journalist
- Edwin Snowe (born 1970), Liberian politician and former Speaker of the Liberian House of Representatives
- Eric Snow (born 1973), American basketball coach and player
- Eric Snow (rugby union) (1898–1974), New Zealand rugby union player
- Ernest A. Snow (1876–1927), American jurist
- Garth Snow (born 1969), American hockey player
- Hank Snow (1914–1999), American country singer
- J. T. Snow (Jack Thomas, born 1968), American baseball player and son of the football player
- Jim Snow (1934–2025), Australian politician
- Julia Warner Snow (1863–1927), American botanist
- Kate Snow (born 1969), American television journalist and correspondent
- Kendall Snow, 21st-century American politician
- Lois Snowe-Mello (1948–2016), American politician
- Lorenzo Snow (1814–1901), fifth President of The Church of Jesus Christ of Latter-day Saints
- Mark Snow (1946–2025), American soundtrack composer
- Mary McCarty Snow (1928–2012), American electronic music composer
- Olympia Snowe (born 1947), United States Senator from Maine
- Paul Snow-Hansen (born 1990), New Zealand sailor
- Phoebe Snow (1950–2011), American singer-songwriter
- Reuben L. Snowe (1866–1942), American politician
- Rod Snow (born 1970), Canadian rugby player from Newfoundland
- Sydney Snow (1887–1958), Australian businessman and politician
- Tony Snow (1955–2008), American television news anchor and White House Press Secretary
- Valaida Snow (1904–1956), American jazz musician

== Fictional characters ==
- Chrissy Snow on the television show Three's Company
- Coriolanus Snow in The Hunger Games franchise
- Elijah Snow in the comic book Planetary
- Ramsay Snow in the novel series A Song of Ice and Fire
- Lucy Snowe, heroine of Charlotte Brontë's novel, Villette

== Disambiguation pages ==
- Barbara Snow (disambiguation)
- Catherine Snow (disambiguation)
- Charles Snow (disambiguation)
- David Snow (disambiguation)
- Edward Snow (disambiguation)
- Ernest Snow (disambiguation)
- Francis Snow (disambiguation)
- George Snow (disambiguation)
- Gordon Snow (disambiguation)
- Jack Snow (disambiguation)
- John Snow (disambiguation)
- Jon Snow (disambiguation)
- Leslie Snow (disambiguation)
- Mike Snow (disambiguation)
- Nancy Snow (disambiguation)
- Peter Snow (disambiguation)
- Samuel Snow (disambiguation)
- Simon Snow (disambiguation)
- Thomas Snow (disambiguation)
- William Snow (disambiguation)
