= Sinagua =

Pre-Columbian culture in Arizona, US

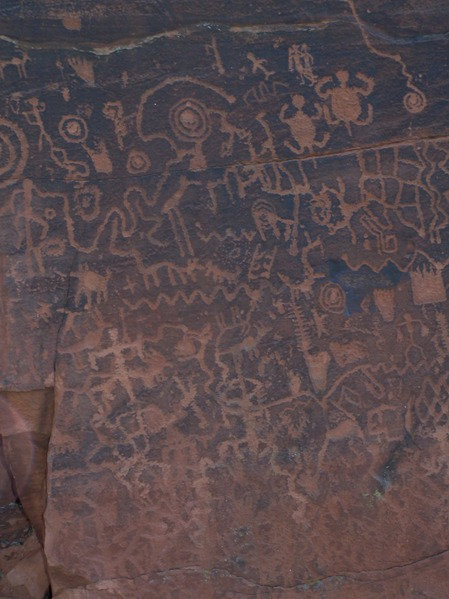
Sinagua petroglyphs at the V Bar V Heritage Site

The Sinagua were a pre-Columbian culture that occupied a large area in central Arizona from the Little Colorado River, near Flagstaff, to the Verde River, near Sedona, including the Verde Valley, area around San Francisco Mountain, and significant portions of the Mogollon Rim country, between approximately 500 and 1425 CE.

Since fully developed Sinagua sites emerged in central Arizona around 650 CE, it is believed they migrated from east-central Arizona, possibly emerging from the Mogollon culture.

== Name ==
The name Sinagua was coined in 1939 by archaeologist Harold S. Colton, founder of the Museum of Northern Arizona, from the Spanish words sin meaning "without" and agua meaning "water", referring to the name originally given by Spanish explorers to the San Francisco Peaks near Flagstaff, the "Sierra Sin Agua". The name reflects the surprise the Spanish felt that such large mountains did not have perennial rivers flowing from them, as is common in Spain.

== Cultural phases ==
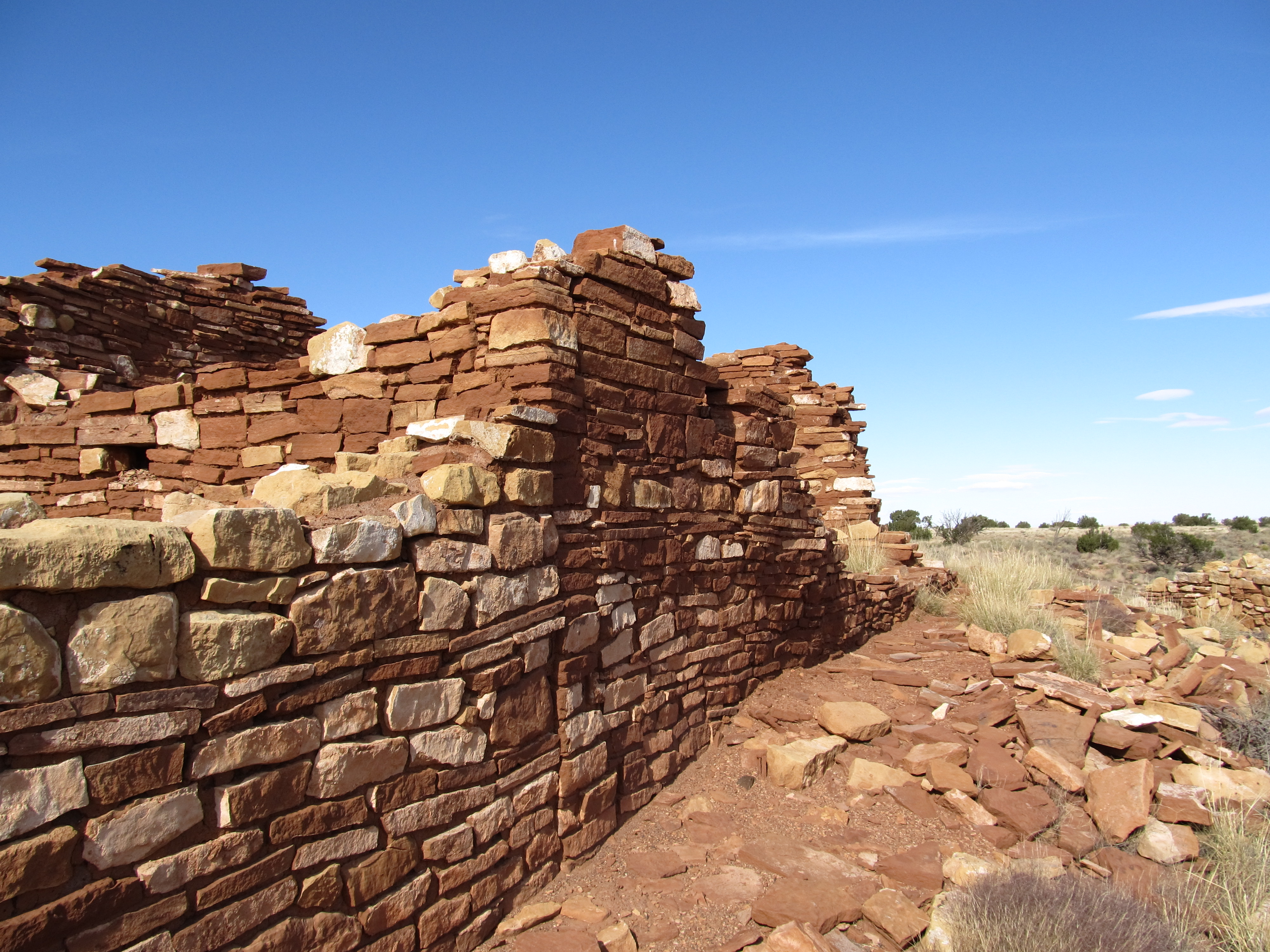
Lomaki Ruins, Wupatki National Monument

Colton also distinguished between two different Sinagua cultures. The Northern Sinagua were loosely centered in the highlands around Flagstaff, with Walnut Canyon National Monument, Wupatki National Monument, and Elden Pueblo the best-known publicly accessible sites. The Southern Sinagua inhabited lower elevations across the Verde Valley of central Arizona; Montezuma Castle National Monument, Montezuma Well, Tuzigoot National Monument, Palatki and Honanki Archaeological Sites, and the V Bar V Heritage Site are notable localities open to the public.

North Sinagua	Dates	Southern Sinagua	Dates
Cinder Park	650–750 CE	Hackberry	650–800 CE
Sunset	700–900	Cloverleaf	800–900
Rio de Flag	900–1066	Camp Verde	900–1150
Angell-Winona	1066–1100		
Padre	1100–1150	1100–1150	
Elden Pueblo	1150–1250	Honanki	1150–1300
Turkey Hill site	1250–1300		
Clear Creek	1300–1400	Tuzigoot	1300–1400

== Subsistence ==
The Sinagua economy was based on a combination of hunter-gatherer foraging and subsistence agriculture. They hunted a variety of game from antelope, bear, rabbit, to turtles and ducks.

They used amaranth, ricegrass, cactus fruit, beeweed flowers, and cattails for flour. Sunflowers, hackberry fruit, yucca, wild grapes, walnuts, pine nuts, and acorns were also important sources of food.

Sinagua farmers cultivated maize beginning in the eighth century. They learned irrigation techniques from their southern Hohokam neighbors and added beans and squash to their crops. The 1064 and 1066 eruptions of Sunset Crater covered the area in ash, which greatly enriched the soil for farming.

Around 700 CE, they became active in the region's long-distance trade which reached the Gulf of California and Mesoamerica. They traded their baskets and woven cotton cloth for copper, macaws, marine shells, salt, and rare pigments.

== Settlements ==
Early Sinagua sites consist mostly of large pit houses, similar to the ones built by the Hohokam people of southern Arizona, and wooden buildings. Later structures more closely resemble the Pueblo architecture practiced by other contemporaneous cultural groups occupying the southwestern United States.

Besides ceremonial kivas, their pueblos had large "community rooms" and some featured ballcourts and walled courtyards, similar to those of the Hohokam culture.

The last known evidence of Sinagua occupation for any site comes from Montezuma Castle, a limestone cliff dwelling by Beaver Creek in Verde Valley. This 65-room structure was believed to be built by Sinagua women between 1100 and 1350 CE.

== Art and material culture ==
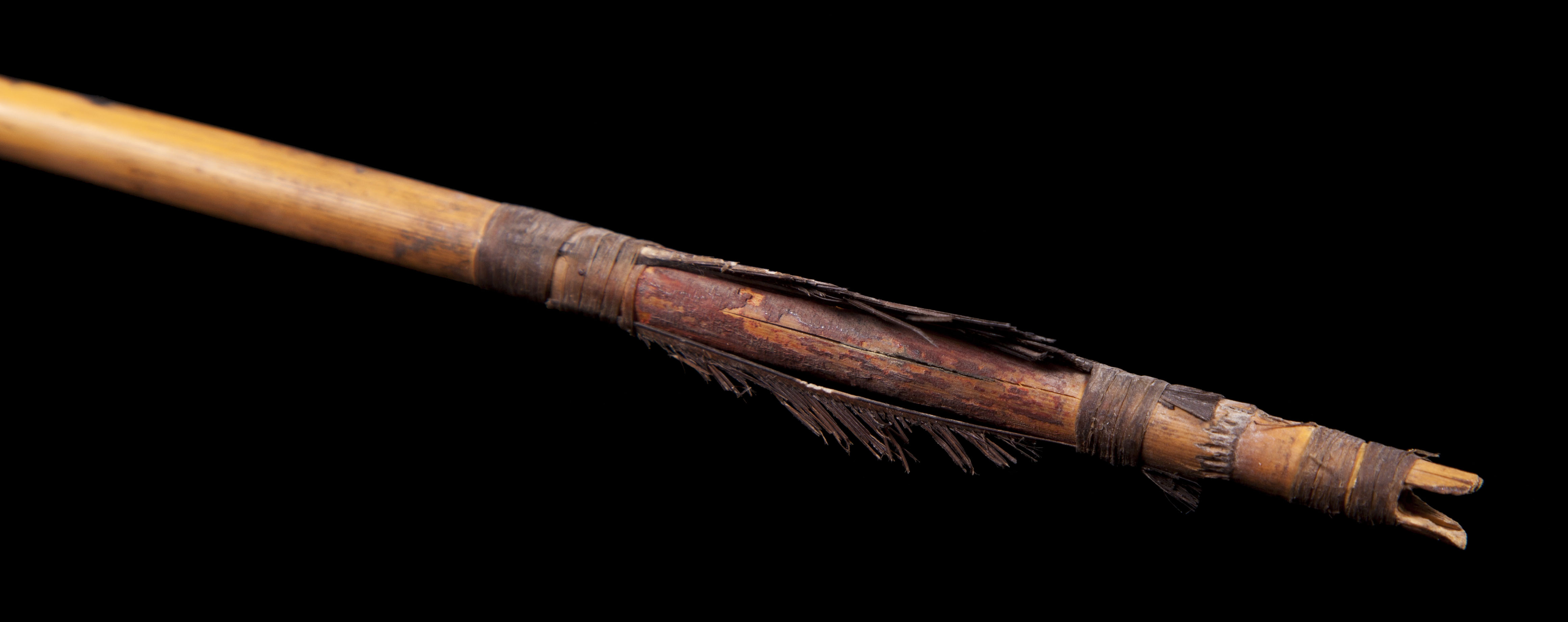
Close view of the sinew wrapped split feathers on a Sinagua arrow mainshaft from Montezuma Castle

Known as Alameda Brown Ware, their plain pottery was built using the paddle-and-anvil method. Their clay was grey or brown, tempered with crushed potsherds, and painted with buff, brown, and red slips.

They carved with imported red argillate.

== Migration and cultural shifts ==
Sinagua peoples left the Verde Valley by the early 15th century. Like other pre-Columbian cultures in the southwest, the Sinagua apparently abandoned their permanent settlements around this time, though the precise reasons for such a large-scale abandonment are not yet known; resource depletion, drought, and clashes with the newly arrived Yavapai people have been suggested.

== Descendants ==
Several contemporary Hopi clans trace their ancestry to immigrants from the Sinagua culture, who they believe left the Verde Valley for religious reasons. Pima, Tohono O'odham, Yavapai, and Zuni also potentially have cultural, linguistic, and historical connections to the Sinagua people.

Melanie O'Brien, acting manager of the National NAGPRA Program, writes of Montezuma Castle:

Evidence demonstrating continuity between the people of the Verde Valley during A.D. 1125–1425 and the Hopi Tribe includes archaeological, anthropological, linguistic, folkloric, and oral traditions. Ceramic vessels made only on the Hopi mesas are found at the sites and are similar to items made by historic and modern Hopi people. Additionally, plain woven and painted textiles, coiled basketry, and woven matting are similar to items made and used by modern Hopi people. Living Hopi clan members also have ancestral names and traditional stories about specific events and people at each site.

== Cliff dwellings of the Sinaguas ==
Cliff dwellings of the Sinaguas
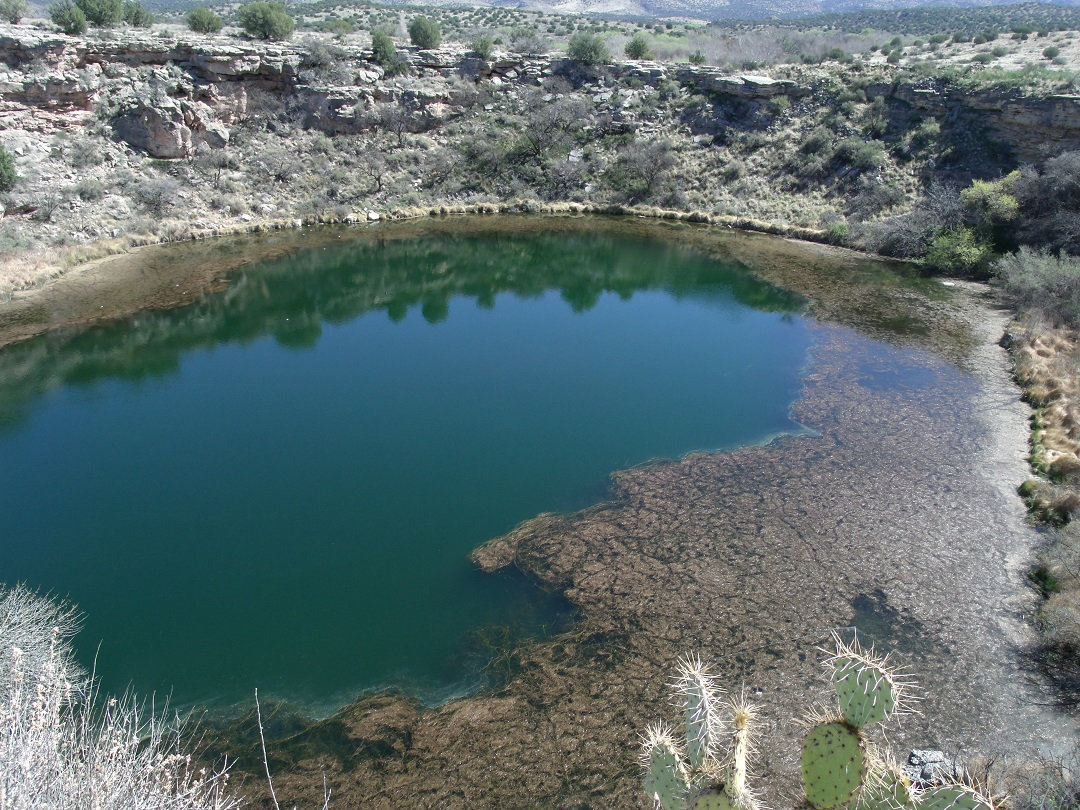
Montezuma Well is listed in the National Register of Historic Places, reference #66000082.

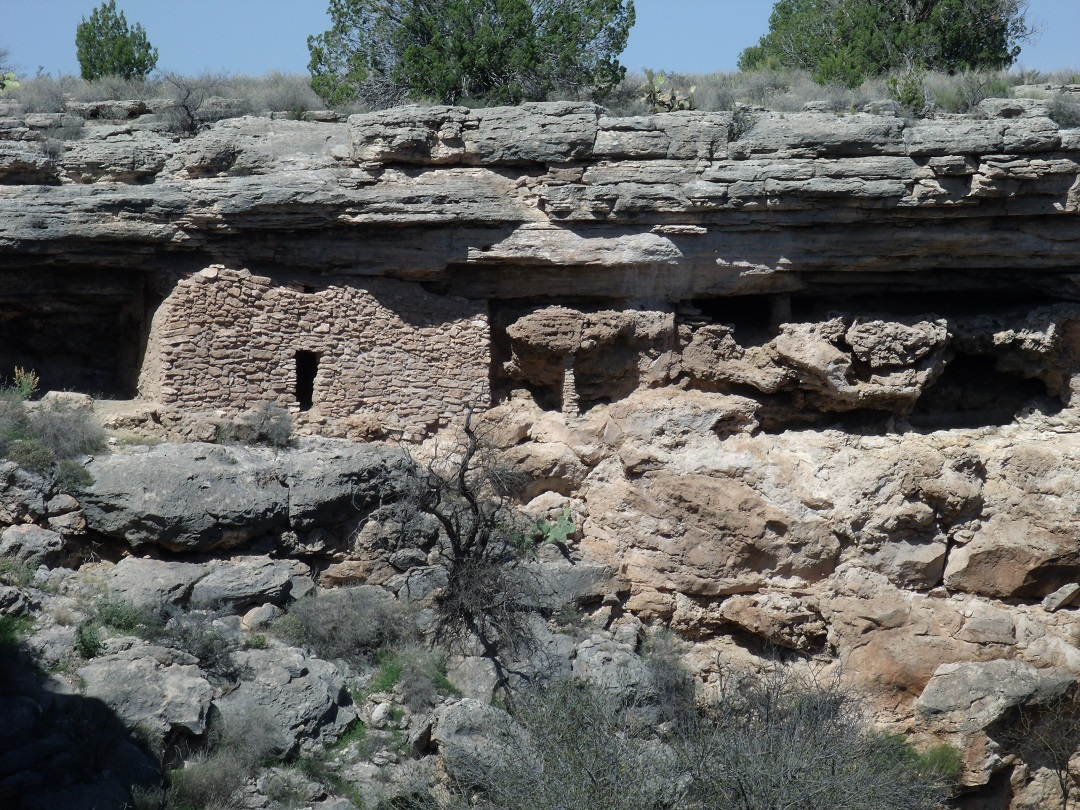
Cliff dwellings of the Sinagua people.

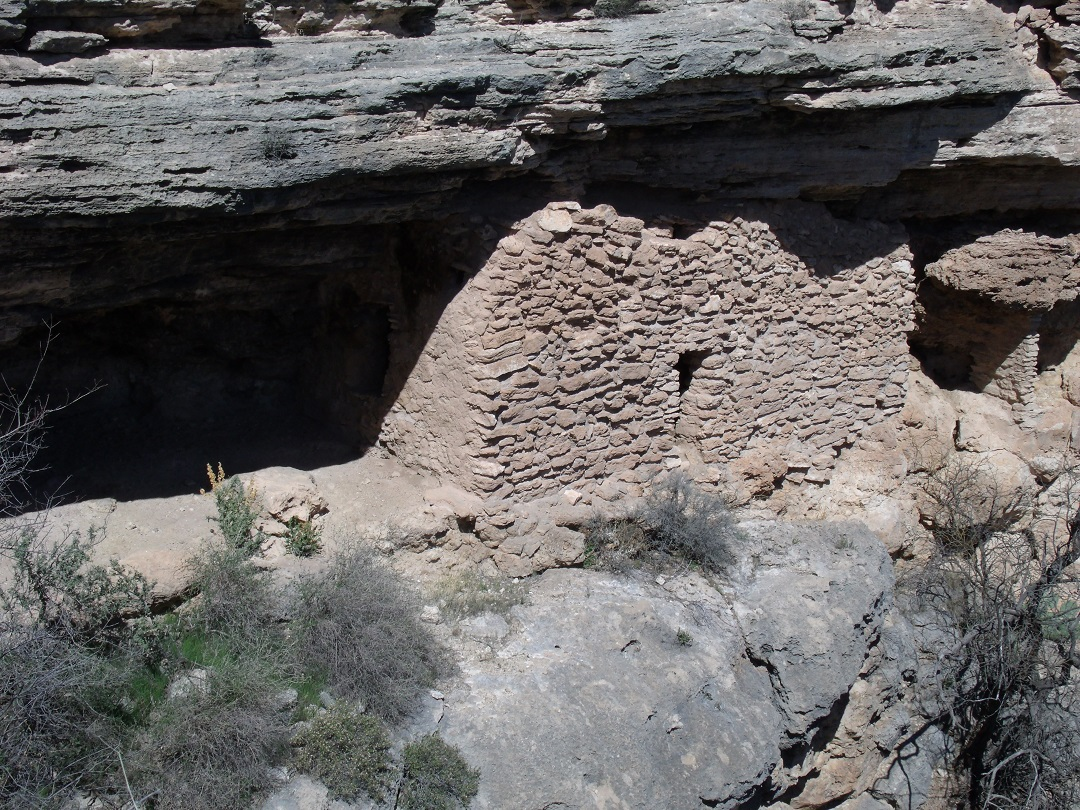
Close up view of the cliff dwellings of the Sinagua people.

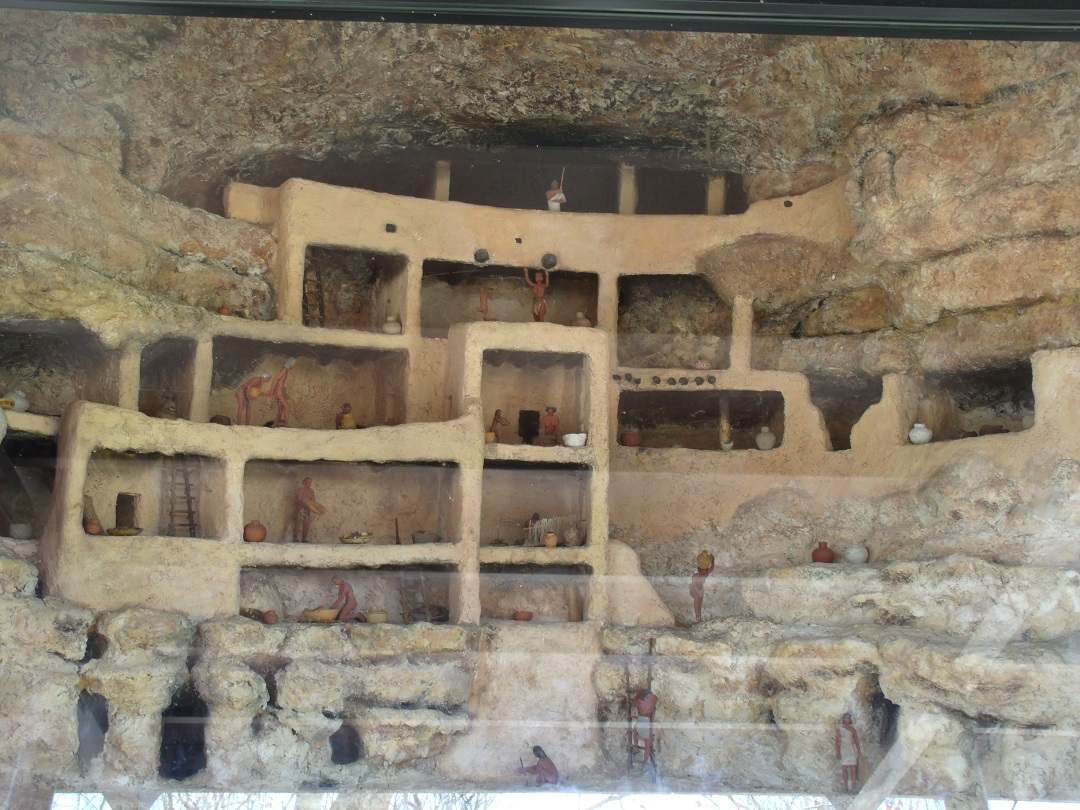
Diorama showing how the pre-Columbian Sinagua people may have lived in Montezuma Castle,

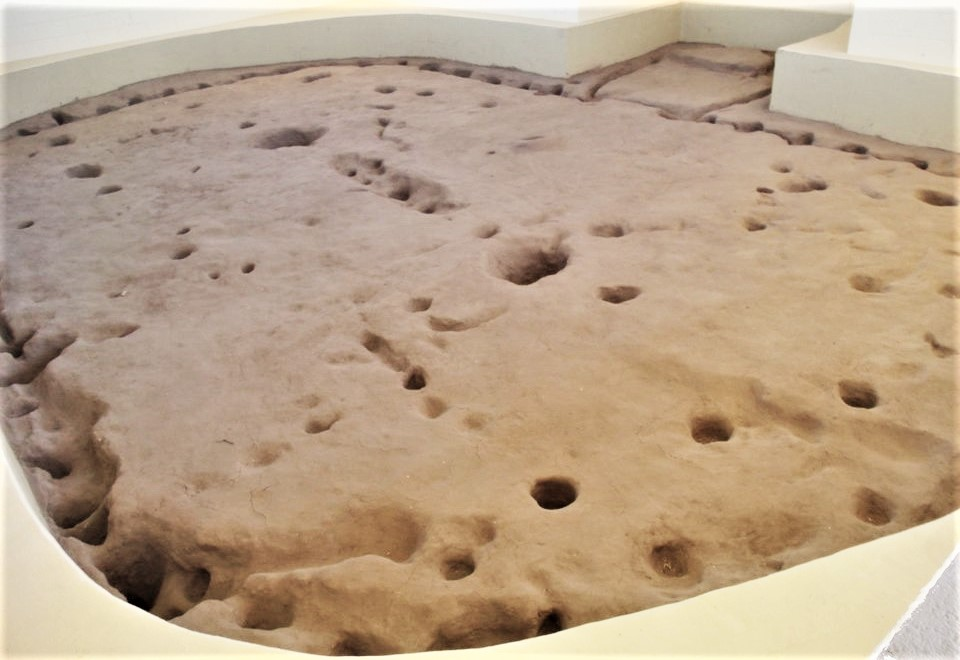
Sinagua pithouse, from 1050 CE. Two largest holes in the dirt floor held the timber roof supports. The holes around the edge reveal the outline of the structure.

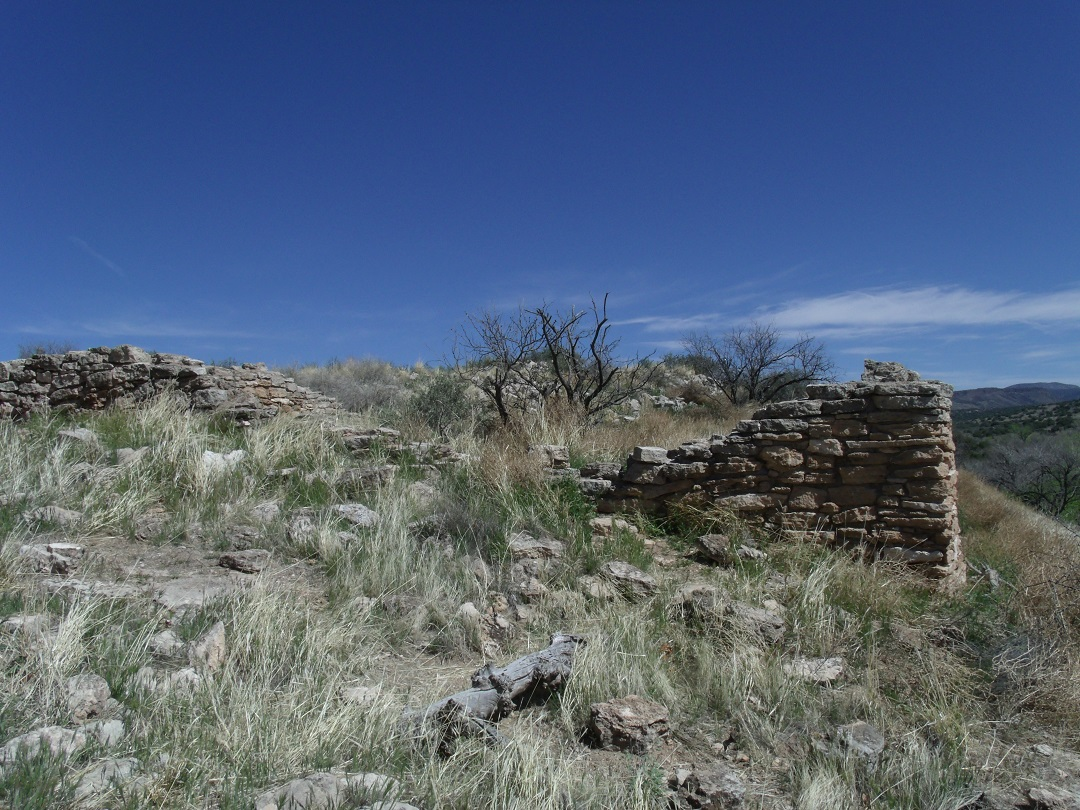
Ruins of a Sinagua house.

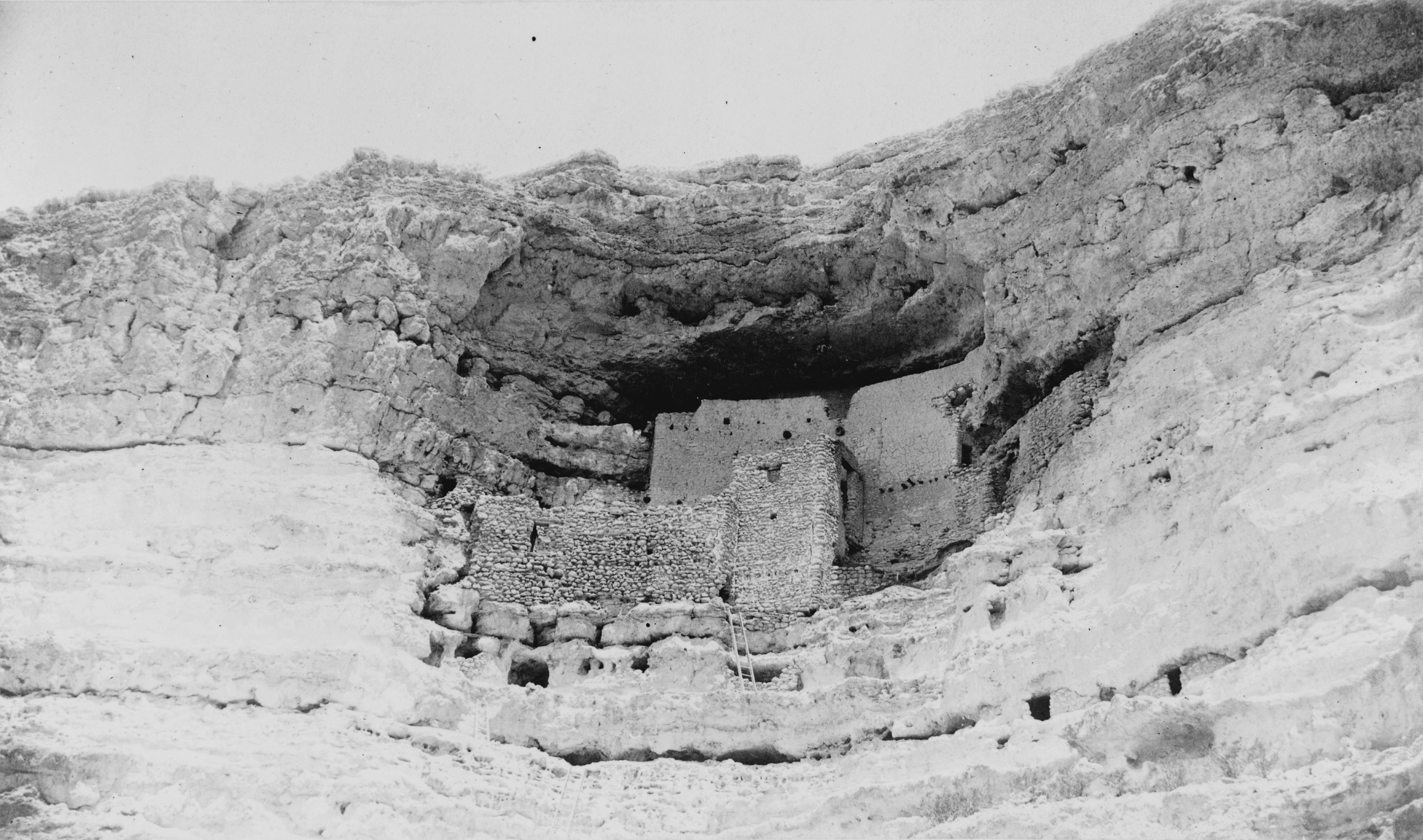
Historic view of the Sinagua cliff dwelling at Montezuma Castle National Monument, 1887

== See also ==
- Desert farming, present-day applications of non-irrigated farming by Native Americans of the southwestern United States
- Ancient Pueblo peoples
- Hohokam
- Mogollon
- Oasisamerica
