= Charles Snow =

Charles Snow may refer to:

- Charles E. Snow (1910–1967), American anthropologist
- Charles Wilbert Snow (1884–1977), American politician
- C. P. Snow (Charles Percy Snow, 1905–1980), English physicist and novelist
