= V Bar V Heritage Site =

Petroglyph site in central Arizona

Coordinates: 34°39′55.476″N 111°42′57.852″W

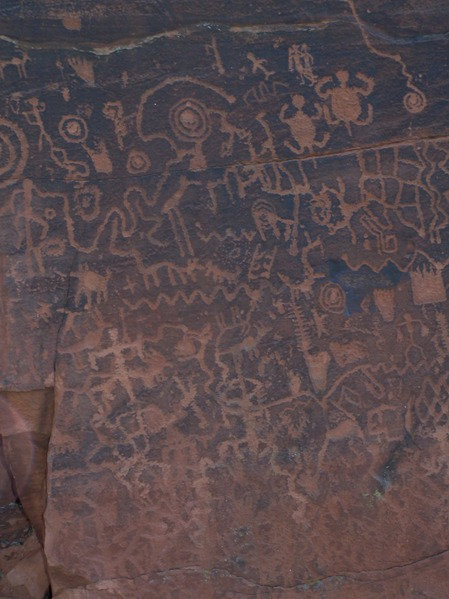
The main panel at the Crane Petroglyph Heritage Site.

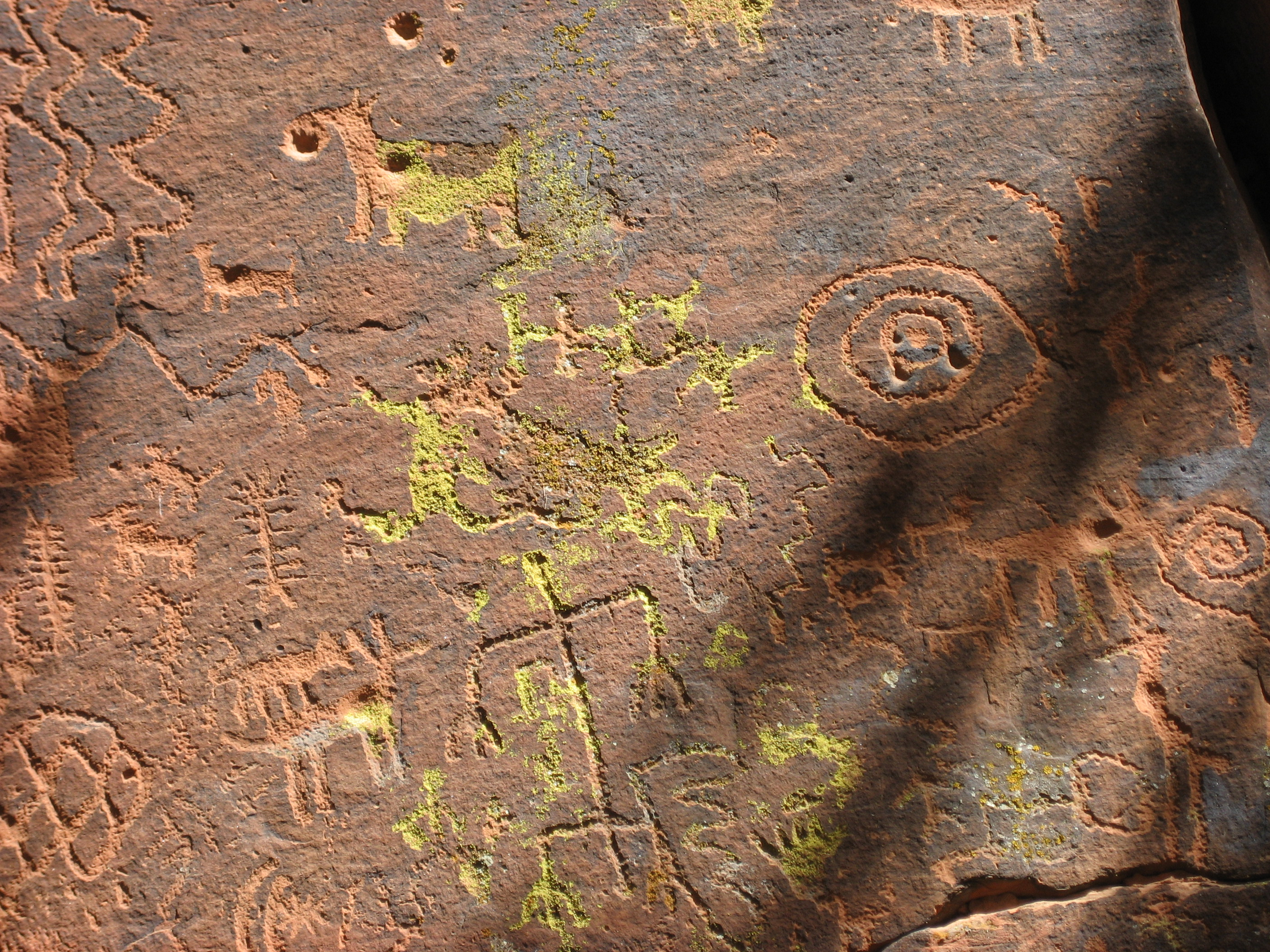
A closer view. The holes are cupules, which served some unknown ritual purpose.

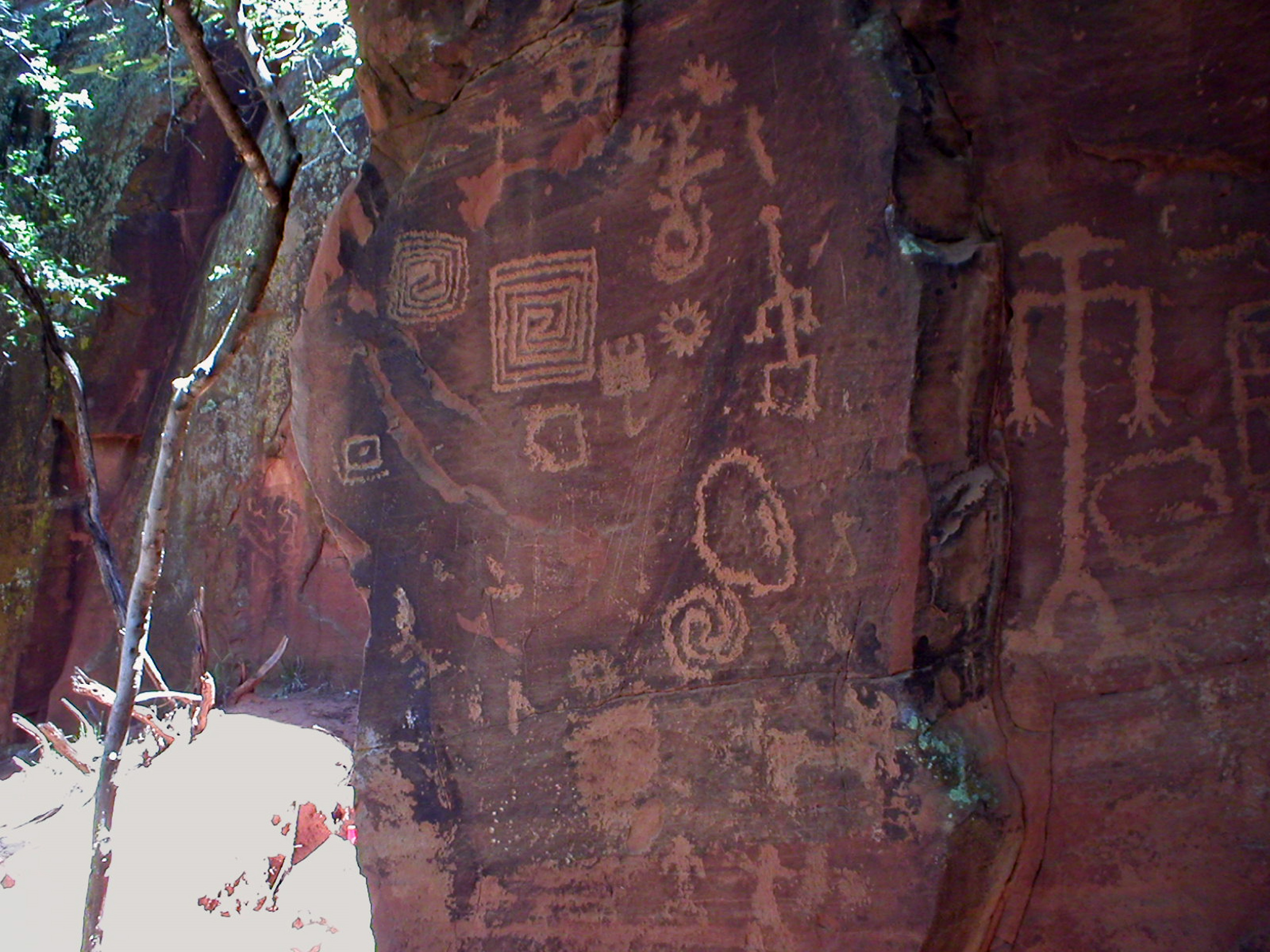
Another view, taken in 2002

The Crane Petroglyph Heritage Site is the largest known petroglyph site in the Verde Valley of central Arizona, and one of the best-preserved. The rock art site consists of 1,032 petroglyphs in 13 panels. Acquired by the Coconino National Forest in 1994, the site is protected and kept open to the public by the US Forest Service. Volunteers from the Verde Valley Archaeological Society and the Friends of the Forest provide interpretive tours and on-site management.

A visitor center, restroom and bookstore, operated by the Forest Service and the Arizona Natural History Association, is located on site. The fenced petroglyph site is an easy half-mile walk from the parking lot. For most of the year, there is a resident on-site custodian.

== History ==
The petroglyphs were created by Southern Sinagua residents between about 1150 and 1400 AD. The site was known to early American settlers, and became part of a cattle ranch around the turn of the 20th century. Some historic ranch buildings remain near the visitor center. The US Forest Service acquired the site in 1994 when it became the V Bar V Heritage Site. The site was renamed Crane Petroglyph Heritage Site on March 16, 2024.

== Beaver Creek rock art style ==
Rock art is one type of archaeological data that can be used to identify prehistoric cultures and time periods. The Beaver Creek rock art style has been identified and formally described through studies of rock art sites in the Beaver Creek area, especially at Crane Petroglyph. The Beaver Creek style, found throughout the eastern half of the Verde Valley, is diagnostic of the Southern Sinagua culture between A.D. 1150 and 1400.

About 20% of the petroglyphs are zoomorphs, including snakes, turtles, coyotes, deer and antelope. The next most common types are anthropomorphs and geometric figures, such as spirals and grids.

The documentation of the Crane Petroglyph Heritage Site has provided important information for defining the characteristics of the Beaver Creek style. Crane Petroglyph is unusual in that all of the petroglyphs are of this one style, and almost all are well-spaced, without overlap or newer designs drawn over older.

== See also ==
- Wet Beaver Wilderness – one-half mile east
