= Palatki Heritage Site =

Archaeological site in Coconino County, Arizona

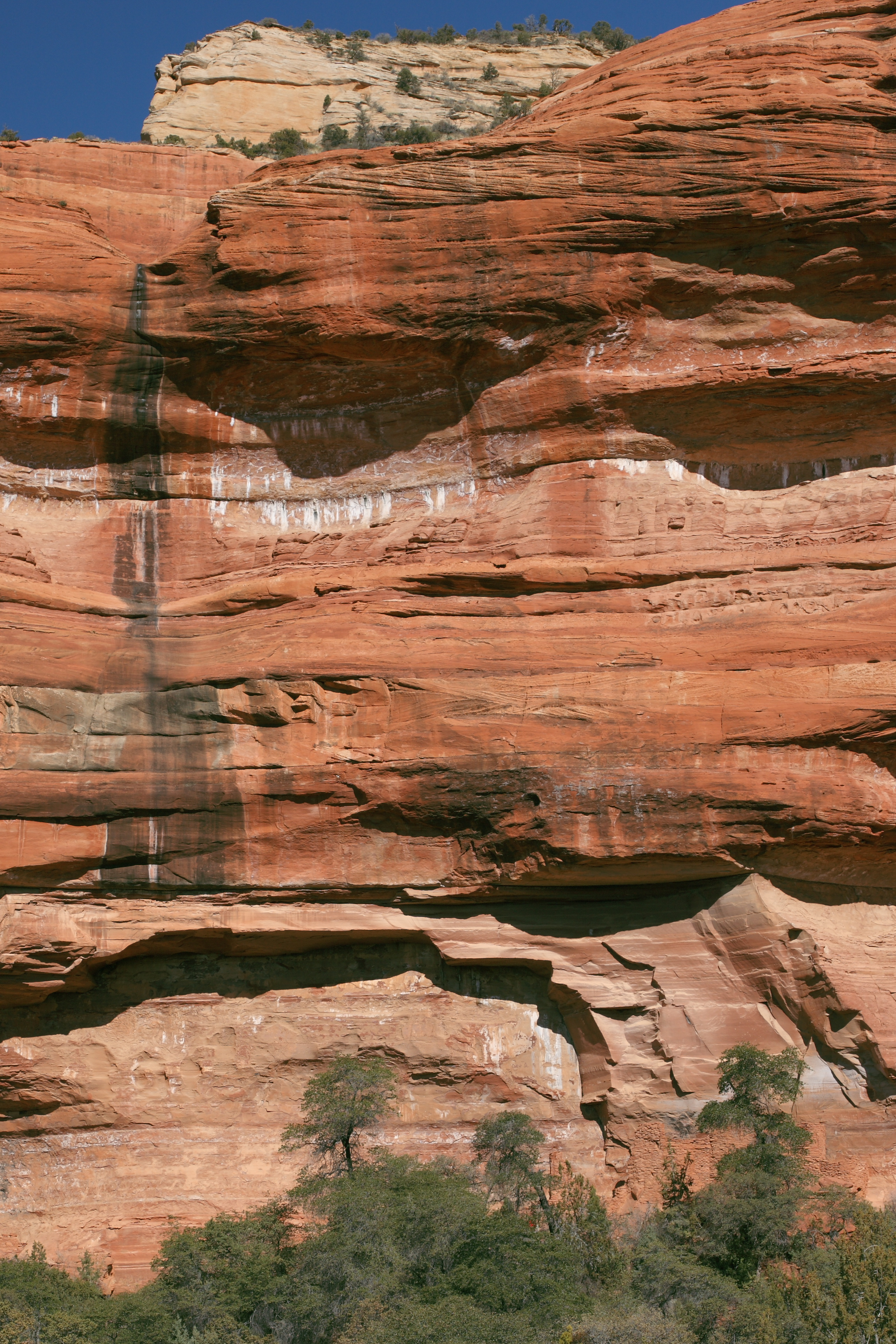
Palatki Heritage Site — Sinagua cliff dwellings at base of sandstone cliff

The Palatki Heritage Site is an archaeological site and park located in the Coconino National Forest, near Sedona, in Arizona, United States at approximately 34°54′56″N 111°54′08″W. In the Hopi language Palatki means 'red house'.

== History ==
Cliff dwellings

The Palatki site has a set of ancient cliff dwellings in the red sandstone cliffs, built from 1100 to 1400 CE by the Sinagua people of the Ancestral Puebloans. The cliff dwellings were built under south-facing overhangs for shelter and winter sun. The Sinagua people planted crops and made pottery in the area. Palatki and Honanki, another nearby archaeological site, had the largest cliff dwellings in the Red Rock formation area from 1150 to 1300 CE.

Palatki consists of two separate pueblos, suggesting two family or kin groups may have lived here, one in each pueblo. The circular shield-like pictographs above the eastern pueblo have been interpreted by some archaeologists as being a kin or clan symbol.

Rock art

There are pictographs and petroglyphs at the Palatki site, including some that predate the cliff dwellings. Many of the pictographs on the rock walls are from the Sinagua. However, those created by peoples of the Archaic period in North America include some of the more abstract pictograph symbols and drawings that are 3,000 to 6,000 years old, and some of the petroglyphs, estimated to be 5,000 to 6,000 years old.

Archaeology

Visitation to the site for over a century has caused degradation of the archaeological elements. It was begun by 19th century Euro-American settlers, with little archaeological awareness for the area.

Photographs from the early 1900s show that an estimated 70 to 90 percent of the original structures have disappeared since then.

== Access ==
The Palatki Heritage Site is open to visitors seven days a week from 9:30am to 3:00pm. The site is accessible by guided tours only, with the last tour at 2:00 PM. Reserve a tour at Recreation.gov. There are two trails in the park, one to view the Sinagua cliff dwellings, and a second to view the pictographs and petroglyphs. The tour includes both sites, for a total distance of 1 mile. The trails are not handicapped accessible. Purchase of a Red Rock Parking Pass is also needed for park entry.

== Gallery ==
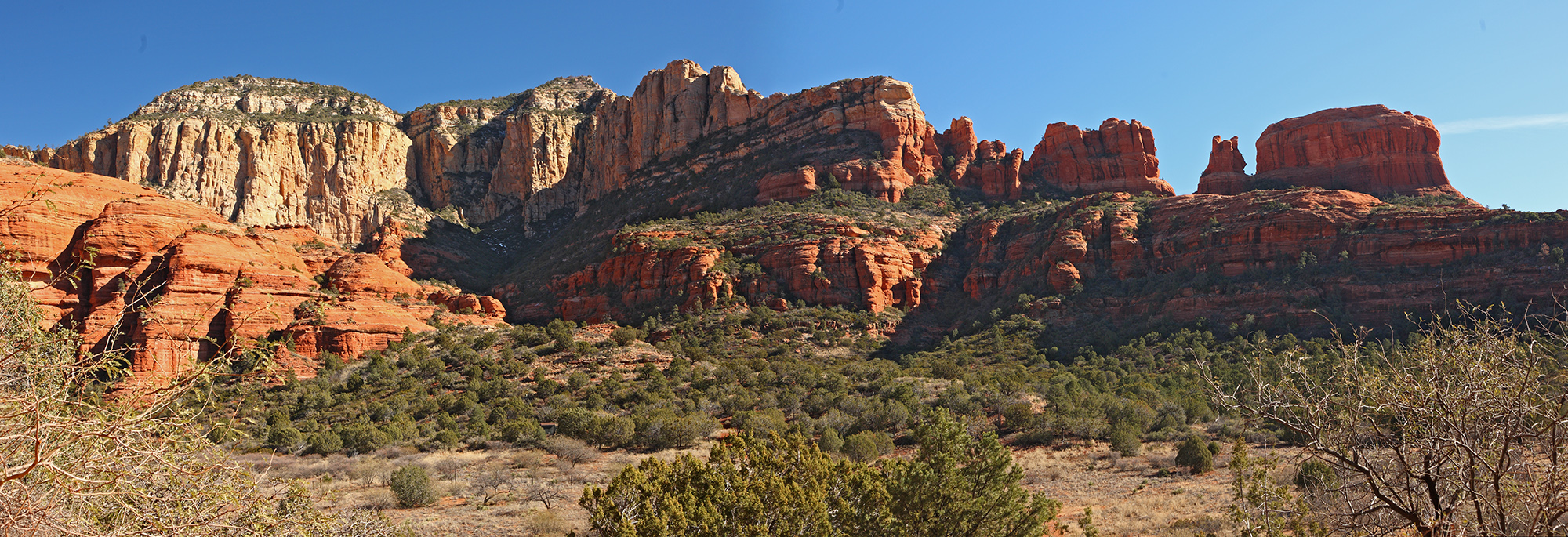
Rock formations at Palatki Heritage Site
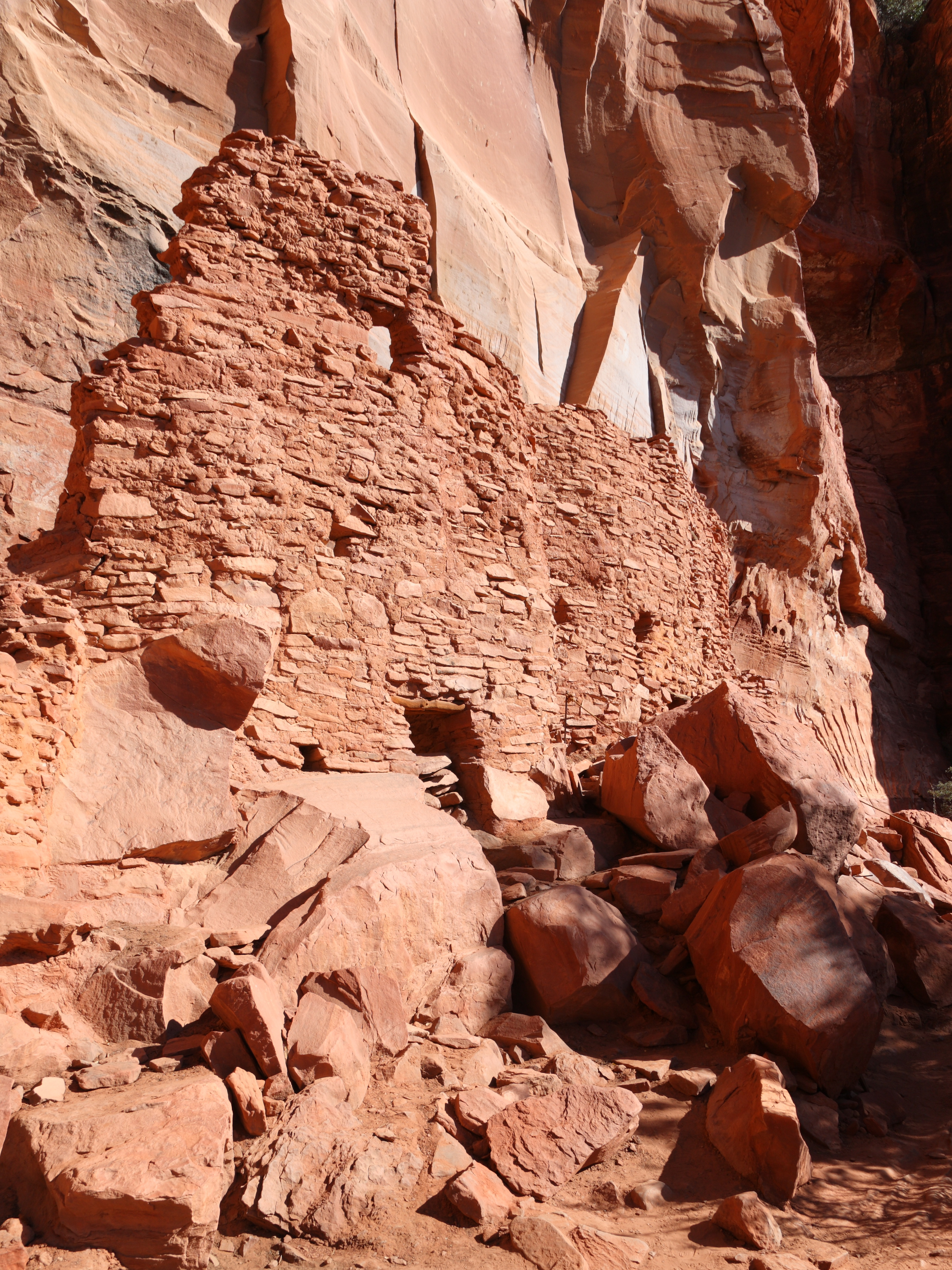
Sinagua cliff dwellings

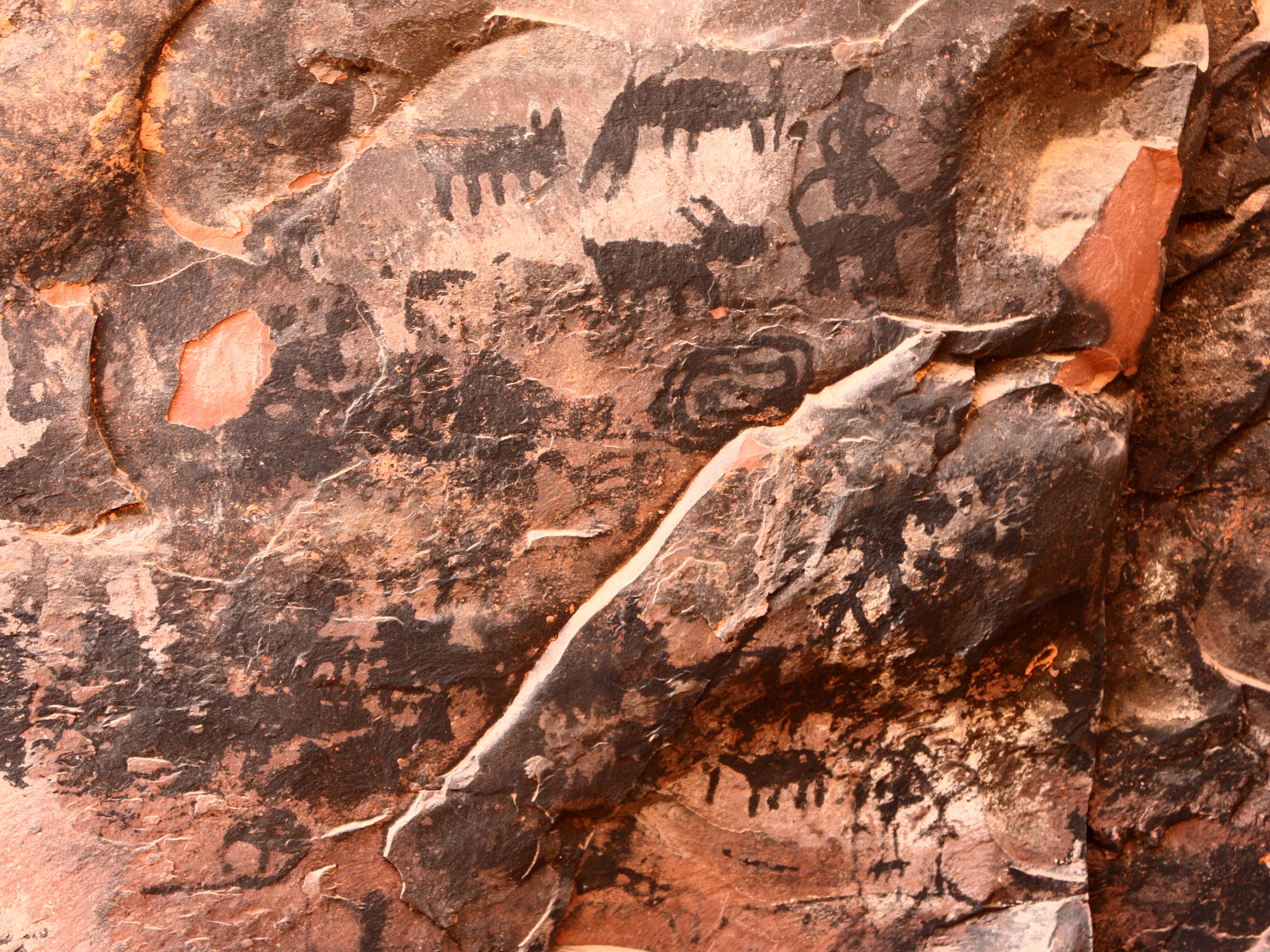
Cave pictographs

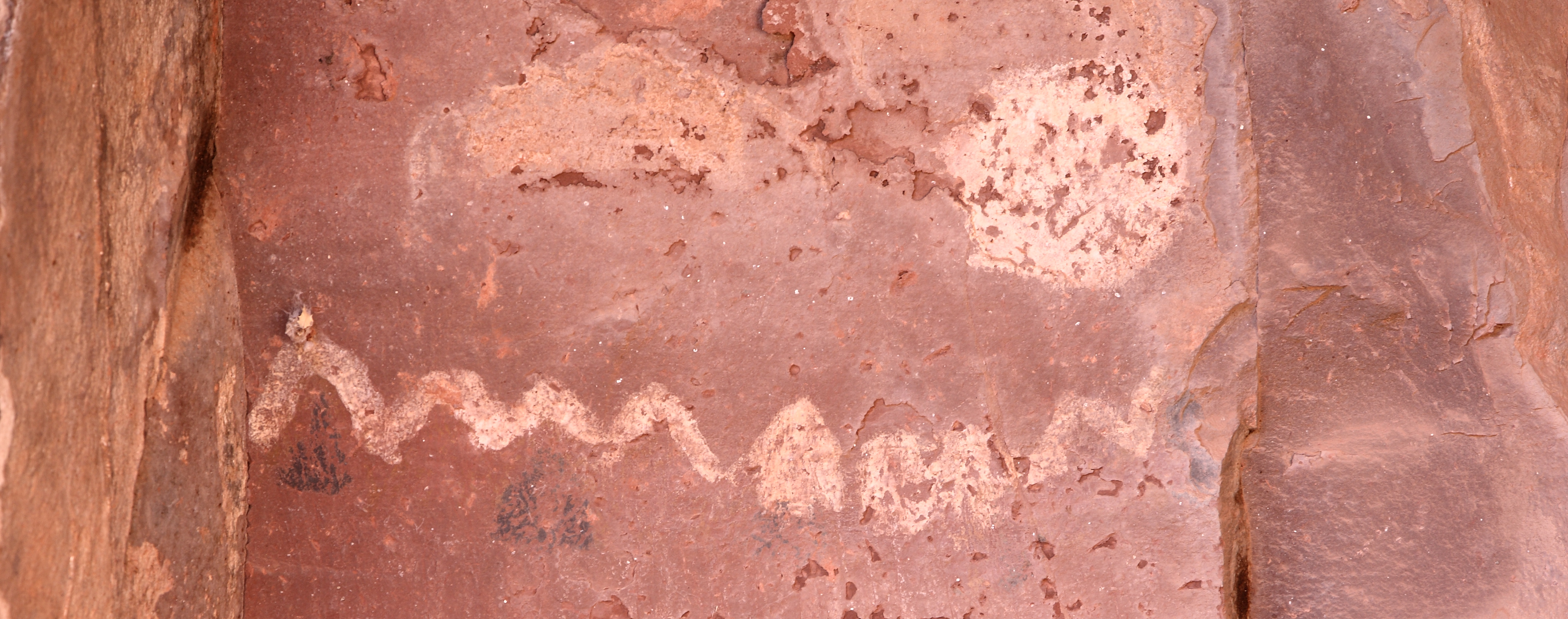
Cave pictograph detailing the position of the sun at summer and winter solstices relative to the rock formations
