= Milton Snow =

American photographer (1905–1986)

- Born: April 9, 1905; Ensley, Alabama, United States
- Died: March 1986 (aged 80); New Mexico, United States
- Other name: Jack Snow
- Education: Riverside Junior College
- Occupation: Photographer
- Years active: 1929–1950s
- Known for: Navajo photographs

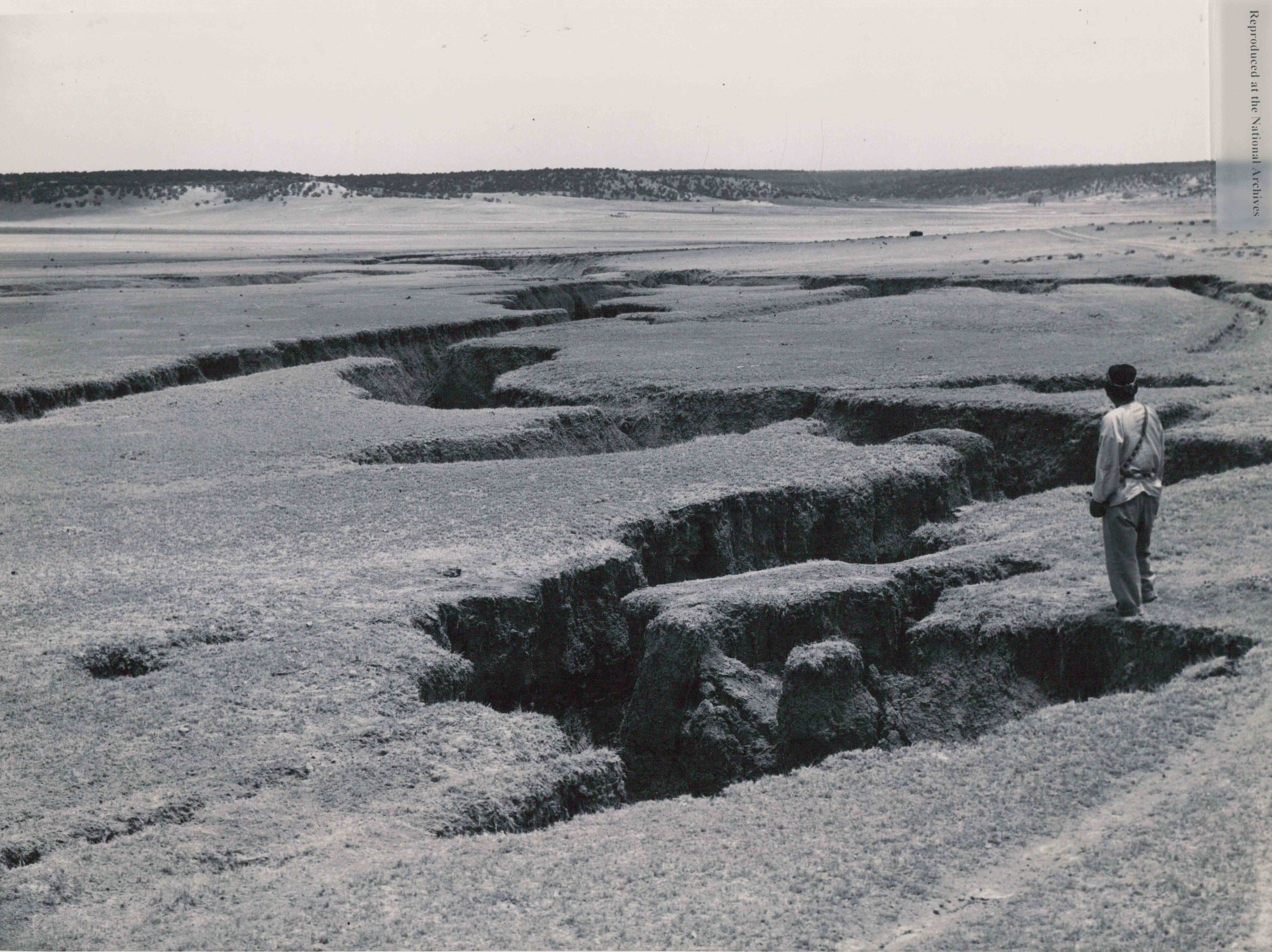
Photograph by Milton "Jack" Snow, Erosion in Gamma Grass Range, Navajo, 1930s

Milton "Jack" Snow (April 9, 1905 – March 1986) was an American photographer who extensively photographed the environmental degradation of Navajo land. He also made many photographs of the Diné people in the American Southwest. Snow's career spanned twenty years, focusing on U.S.–Navajo relations.

Snow was employed by the Navajo Service for this project after the impact of "John Collier's draconian Livestock Reduction Program of the 1930's and 40s."

== Early life and education ==
Snow was born in Ensley, Alabama, on April 9, 1905, to Maud and Joseph Snow. He attended Riverside Polytechnic High School, and later studied geology and photography at Riverside Junior College.

== Career ==
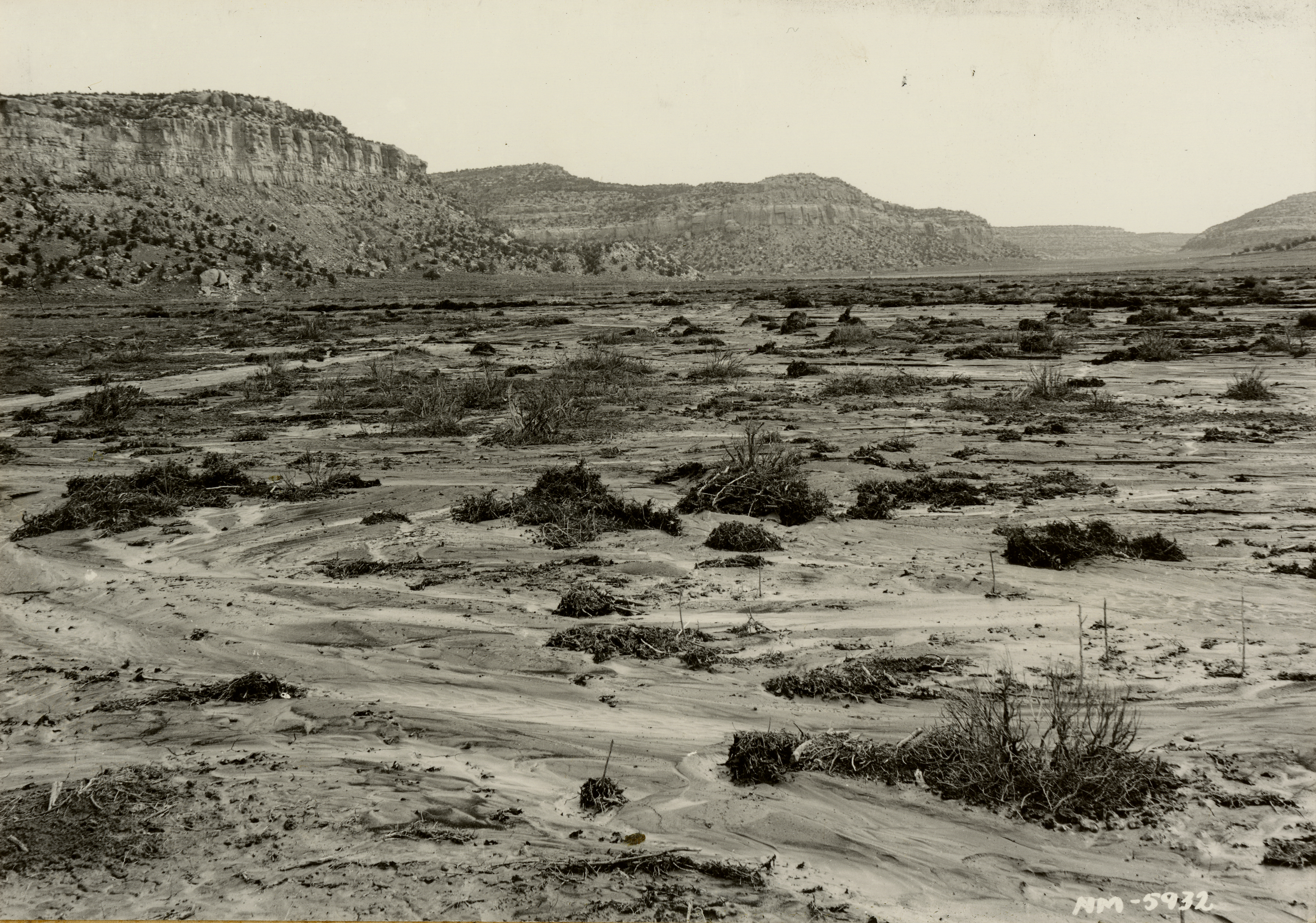
Milton "Jack" Snow, "Effects of Flood in an Intermittent Stream", 1936

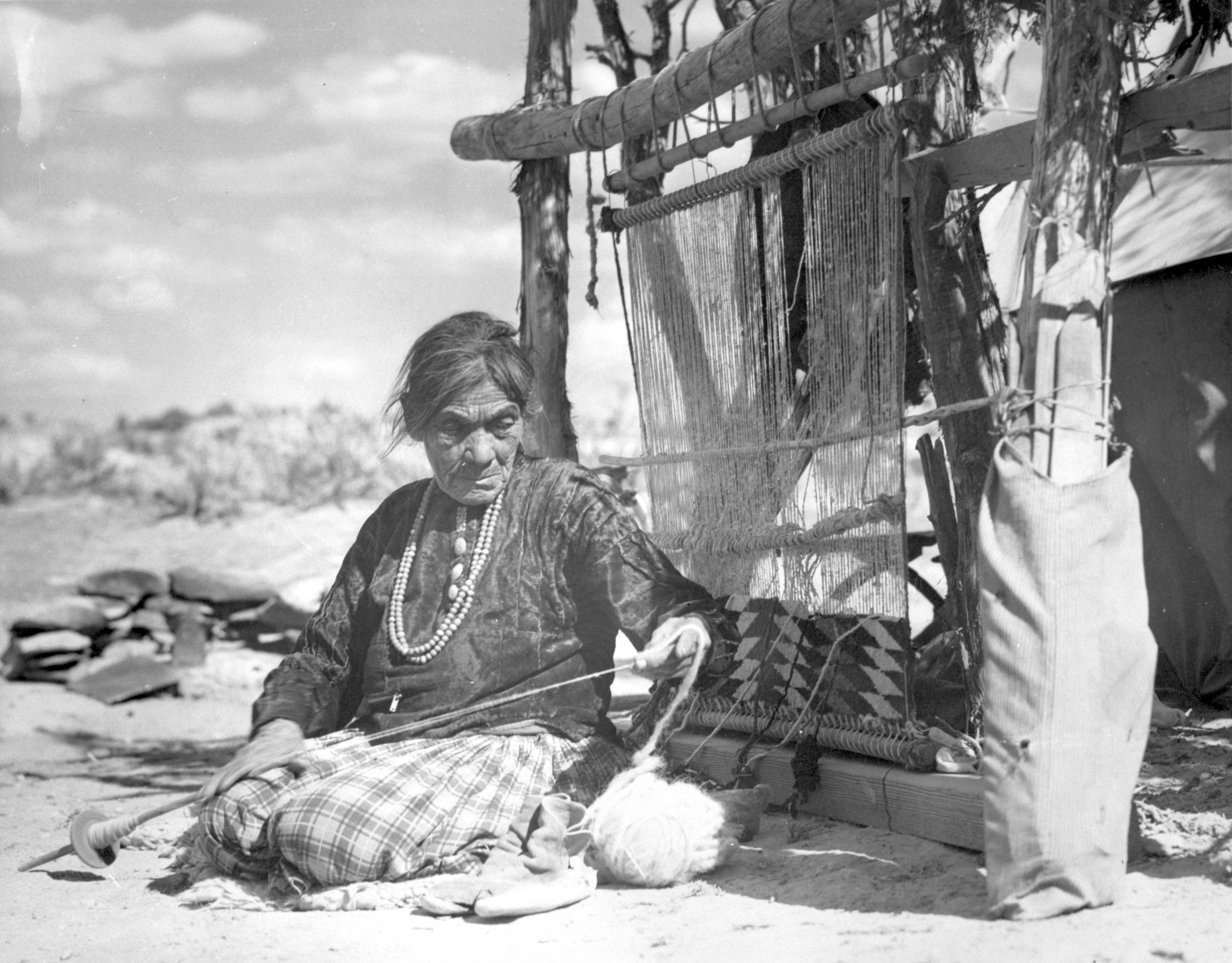
Milton "Jack" Snow, Navajo weaver spinning wool into yarn; full-length, seated, with a loom behind her, Torreon, New Mexico, 1930s

Snow was hired by the Los Angeles Museum in 1929 as the institution's archaeological fieldman and photographer. He went on to photograph the Wupatki National Monument in 1934. Following that he was hired by the Museum of Northern Arizona as a staff photographer. In 1935 he became employed by the Works Progress Administration to photograph the Navajo Nation, and the social, environmental and economic conditions of the Diné people.

In 1937, he was hired by the Navajo Service where he was charged with creating a photography department to document the "impact of federal programs on Navajo lives." He built a darkroom at the Navajo Service Employees' Club in Window Rock, Arizona. He also constructed a mobile darkroom in a panel truck.

Writing in The Avery Review, Diné writer Zoë Toledo stated, "In the 1930s, federal officials invented a narrative of the decline of Native land" which was linked livestock husbandry on the Navajo Nation to erosion. The Navajo Livestock Reduction Program was created by John Collier, the Indian Affairs Commissioner in the 1930s, which resulted in the Diné people losing more than half their livestock, causing "massive trauma to the Navajo world." The program negatively impacted land use, religious practices, health, education and tribal government. The Diné people refer to the destructive impact of the program as the "Second Long Walk" due to the ways it harmed their way of life and economy (they made half their income from livestock).

In the late 1940s he photographed numerous trading posts on Navajo land; these images are in the archives of the Palace of the Governors in Santa Fe, New Mexico. In the 1950s, Snow photographed uranium mining on Navajo lands and the impact thereof on the people and their land.

In 1985, the U.S. government released between 20,000 and 30,000 photographs taken on the Navajo Reservation between the 1880s and mid-1900s. These included the Snow Collection, which were considered "priceless" because they documented times when the Navajo Nation was undergoing rapid change.

Snow died in March 1986 in New Mexico.

== Exhibitions ==
In 2023 the Navajo Nation Museum received support from the Henry Luce Foundation to present an exhibition of his work. A solo show of his photographs were exhibited in 2024 at the Maxwell Museum of Anthropology.

== Collections ==
His Kéyah tse Khoi' = Land of Cañons (1941) portfolio is held in the Arizona Archives. It documents the landscape, and arts and crafts of the Diné people of New Mexico and Arizona. A selection of his photographs, Milton "Jack" Snow: Black and White photos used in "A Political History of the Navajo Tribe, 1898-1970" are held in the New Mexico Archives at the University of New Mexico Center for Southwest Research & Special Collections / Robert W. Young Pictorial Collection (PICT).

His work is held in the permanent collection of the Amon Carter Museum of American Art, the Navajo Nation Museum, the National Archives and Records Administration, the Special Collections and Archives of Northern Arizona University, and the Palace of the Governors photo archives.

The U.S. National Archives and Records Administration holds 219 of his images under the name Milton Snow, and some are held in the archive under his nickname, Jack Snow.
