= Jack Snow =

Jack Snow may refer to:

- Jack Snow (writer) (1907–1956), writer of Oz books
- Jack Snow (American football) (1943–2006), American football player
- J. T. Snow (Jack Thomas, born 1968), American baseball player and son of the football player
- Milton Snow (1905–1986), American photographer

== See also ==
- John Snow (disambiguation)
- Jon Snow (disambiguation)
- Jack Frost (disambiguation)
