= Honanki =

Cliff dwelling in Yavapai County, Arizona

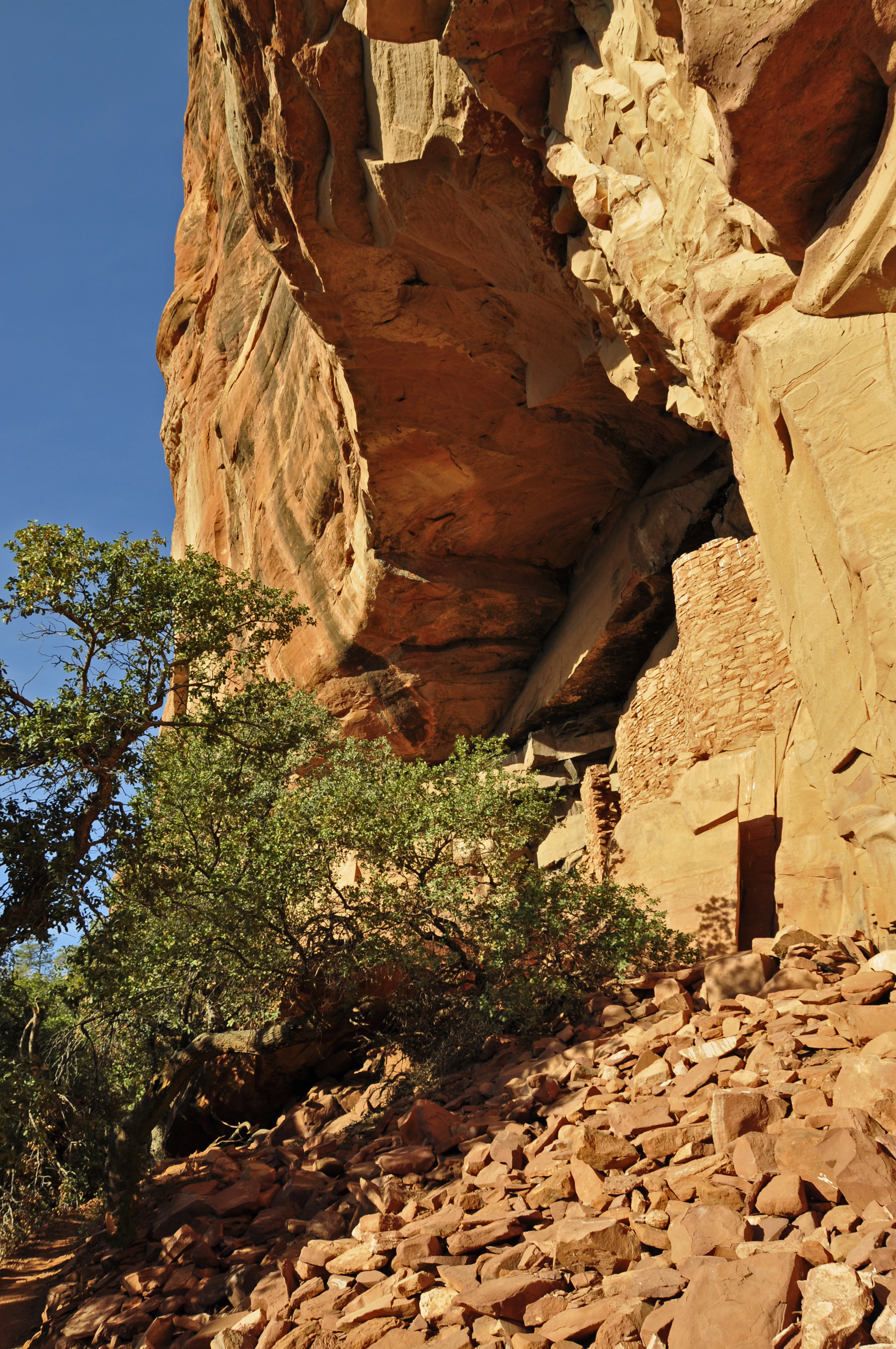
Cliff dwelling at Honanki

The Honanki Heritage Site is a cliff dwelling and rock art site located in the Coconino National Forest, about 15 miles (24 km) west of Sedona, Arizona. The Sinagua people of the Ancestral Puebloans, and ancestors of the Hopi people, lived here from about 1100 to 1300 CE. The Palatki Heritage Site is nearby, also in the Coconino National Forest.

== History ==
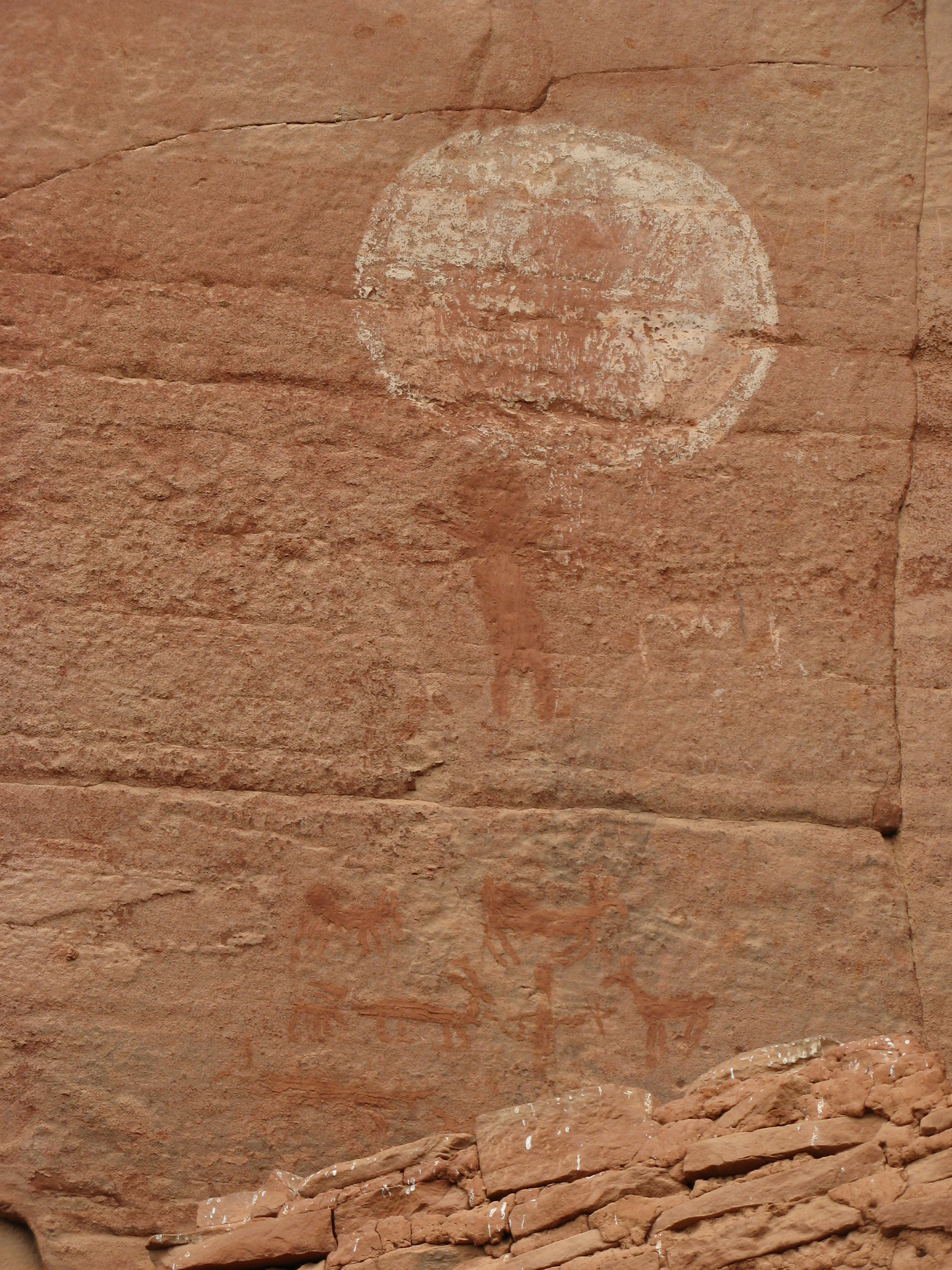
A prominent pictogram on site

Ancient peoples

The Honanki and Palatki archaeological sites were first studied by Jesse Walter Fewkes of the Smithsonian Institution. He conducted test excavations at both sites in 1895 and in 1911, during his study of Hopi migration traditions. Fewkes named the site "Honanki," which means "Bear House" in the Hopi language. Honanki was one of the largest prehistoric pueblos in the Verde Valley. This period in Southern Sinagua prehistory is called the "Honanki Phase." Many of the cliff dwellings in the area west of Sedona were occupied during the Honanki Phase. The Sinagua occupation of Honanki was probably between 1130 and 1280 CE, based on a tree-ring date of 1271 (from a wooden beam in the ruin) and other archaeological evidence.

The rooms at the east end of Honanki were all destroyed in a large fire. Fire-marked stones were then reused to build new rooms. There were at least three phases of construction in the Honanki alcove.

Pictographs are a key feature of the site. Some of them were present before the caves were inhabited, dating to 2000 BCE. However, most of the pictographs are additions from the Sinagua peoples dating between 900 and 1300 CE.

Historic peoples

Honanki was later inhabited by both Yavapai and Apache people. Pictographs dating between 1400 and 1875 CE can be attributed to these two groups.

== See also ==
- Palatki Heritage Site
- Red Rock-Secret Mountain Wilderness
