= Wupatki National Monument =

Protected area in Coconino County, Arizona

- IUCN category V (protected landscape/seascape)
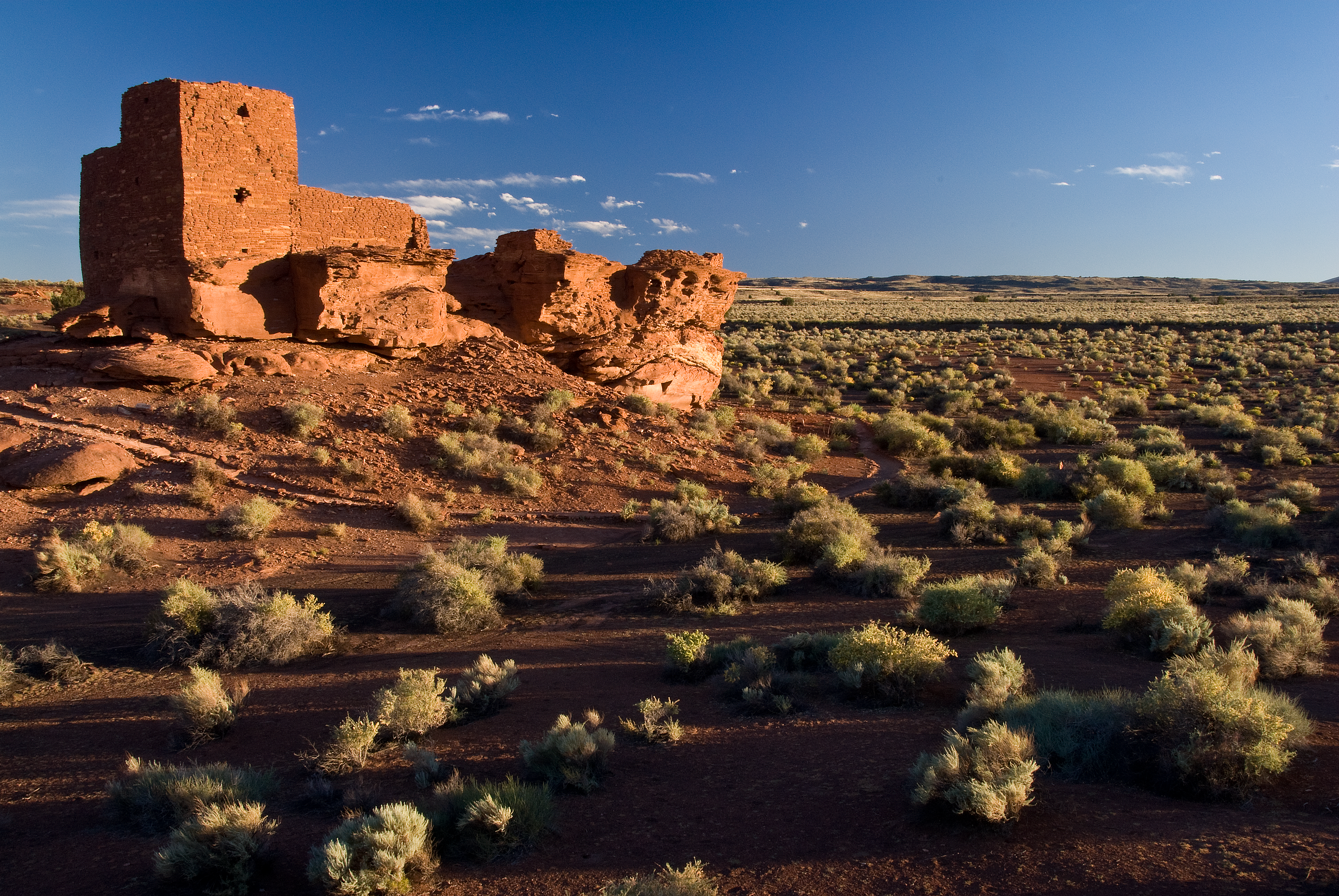
- Wukoki in 2008
- Location: Coconino County, Arizona, US
- Nearest city: Flagstaff, Arizona
- Coordinates: 35°33′27″N 111°23′45″W
- Area: 35,422 acres (143.35 km^{2})
- Created: December 9, 1924
- Visitors: 129,864 (in 2025)
- Governing body: National Park Service
- Website: Wupatki National Monument

The Wupatki National Monument is a United States National Monument located in north-central Arizona, near Flagstaff. Rich in Native American archaeological sites, the monument is administered by the National Park Service in close conjunction with the nearby Sunset Crater Volcano National Monument. Wupatki was established as a national monument in 1924 and was listed on the National Register of Historic Places on October 15, 1966. The listing included three contributing buildings and 29 contributing structures on 35,422 acres (14,335 ha).

== History ==
The many settlement sites scattered throughout the monument were built by the Ancient Pueblo People, more specifically the Cohonina, Kayenta, and Sinagua. Wupatki, which means "Long Cut House" in the Hopi language, is a multistory pueblo dwelling comprising over 100 rooms and a community room and the northernmost ballcourt ever discovered in North America, creating the largest building site for nearly 50 miles. Nearby secondary structures have also been uncovered, including two kiva-like structures. A major population influx began soon after the eruption of Sunset Crater in the 11th century (between 1040 and 1100), which blanketed the area with volcanic ash, improving agricultural productivity and the soil's ability to retain water. By 1182, approximately 85 to 100 people lived at Wupatki Pueblo, but by 1225, the site was permanently abandoned. For many years, layers of ash and lava would have made habitation difficult. Based on a careful survey of archaeological sites conducted in the 1980s, an estimated 2,000 people moved into the area during the century following the eruption. Agriculture was based mainly on maize and squash raised on the arid land without irrigation. In the Wupatki site, the residents harvested rainwater due to the rarity of springs.

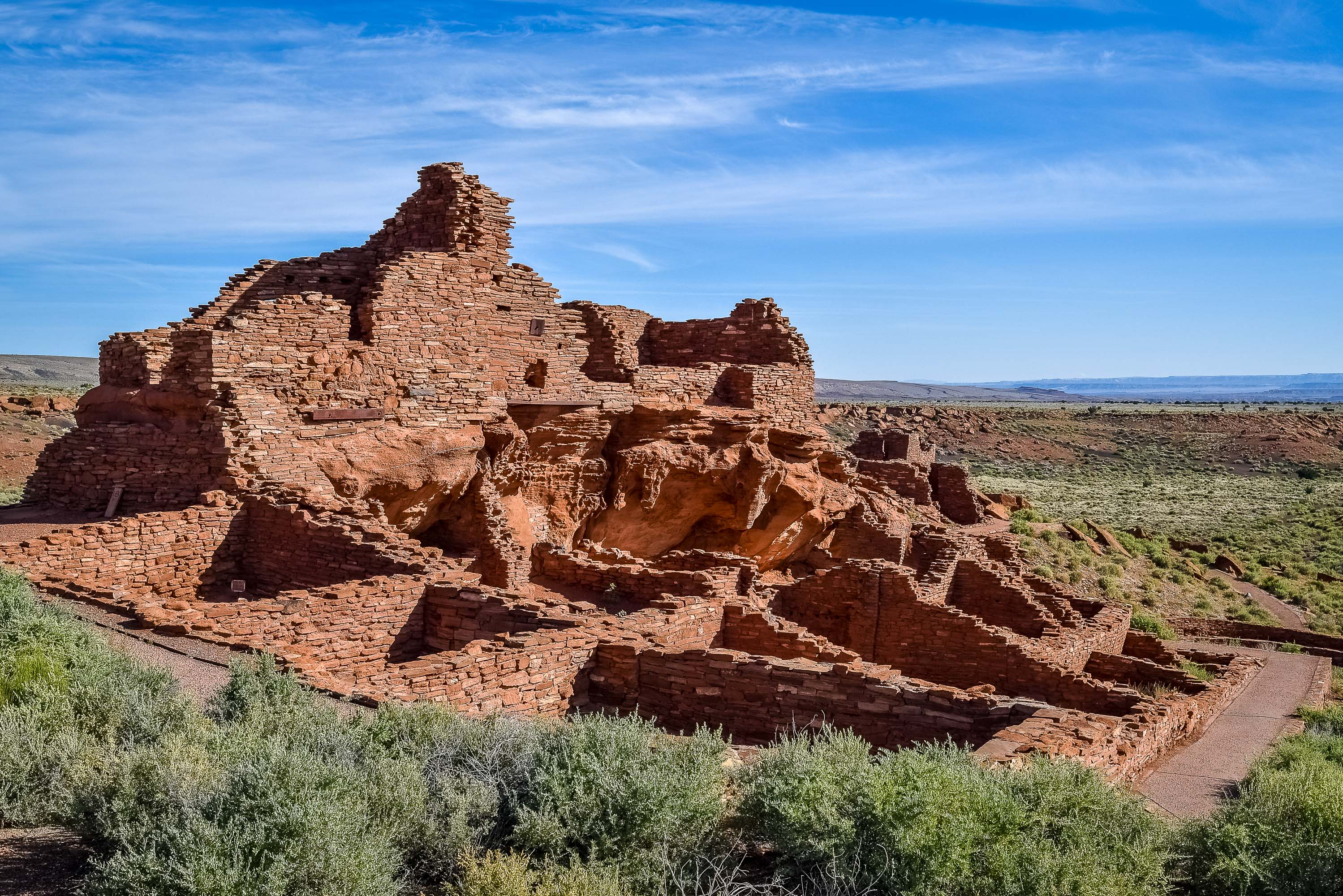
Wupatki National Monument

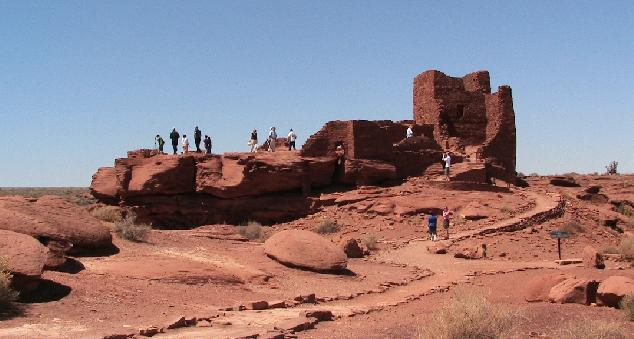
Wukoki complex

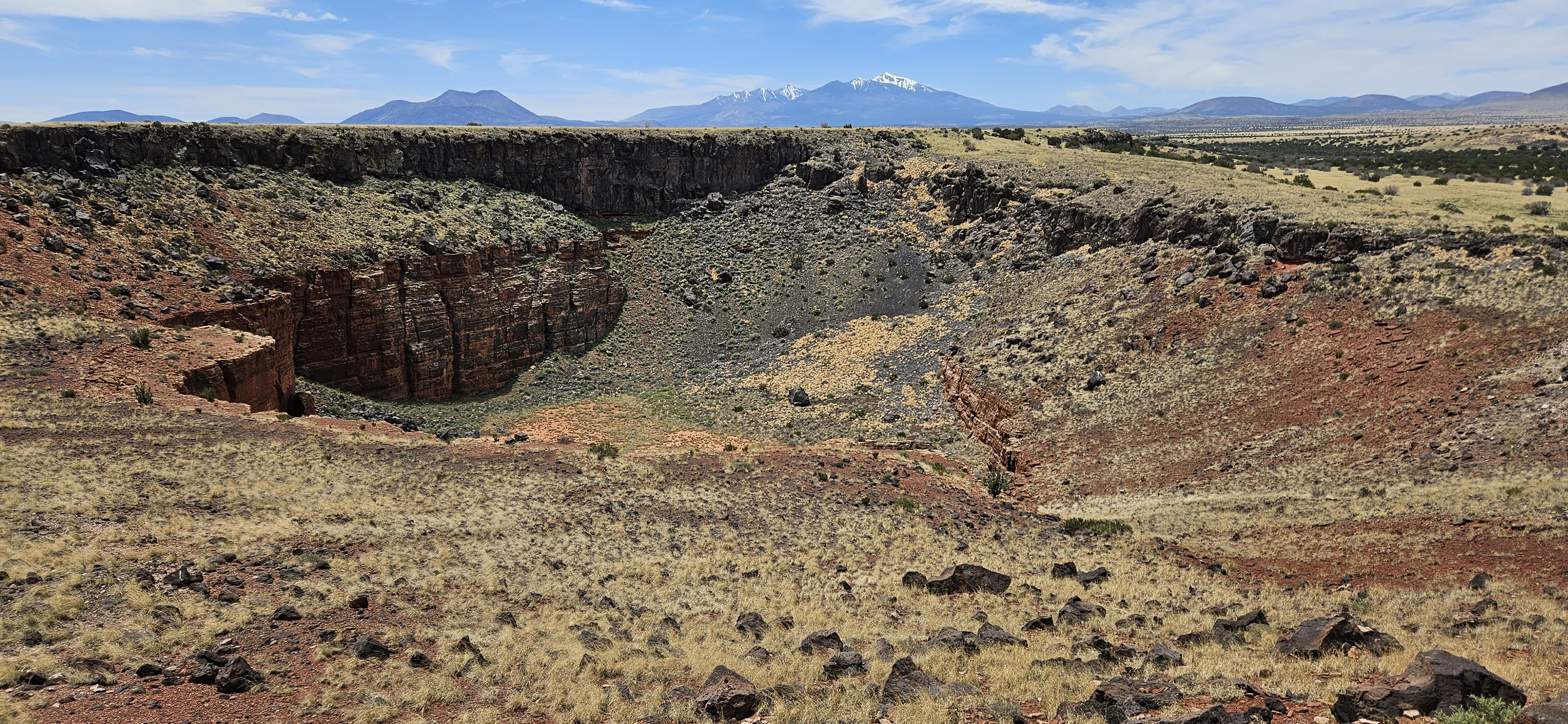
Citadel Sink, as seen from Citadel Pueblo

The dwelling's walls were constructed from thin, flat blocks of the local Moenkopi sandstone, giving the pueblos their distinct red color. Held together with mortar, many of the walls still stand. Each settlement was constructed as a single building, sometimes with scores of rooms. The largest settlement on monument territory is the Wupatki Pueblo, built around a natural rock outcrop. With more than 100 rooms, this pueblo is believed to be the region's tallest and largest structure for its time period. The monument also contains structures identified as a ball court, similar to those found in Mesoamerica and in the Hohokam sites of southern Arizona; this is the northernmost example of this kind of structure. This site also contains a geological blowhole, from which wind escapes from a cave system. Other major sites are Wukoki and The Citadel.

Today, Wupatki appears empty and abandoned, but it is remembered and cared for. Although it is no longer physically occupied, Hopi believe the people who lived and died here remain as spiritual guardians. Stories of Wupatki are passed on among Hopi, Navajo, Zuni, and other Native American tribes in the region. Members of the Hopi Bear, Katsina, Lizard, Rattlesnake, Sand, Snow, and Water Clans return periodically to enrich their personal understanding of their clan history.

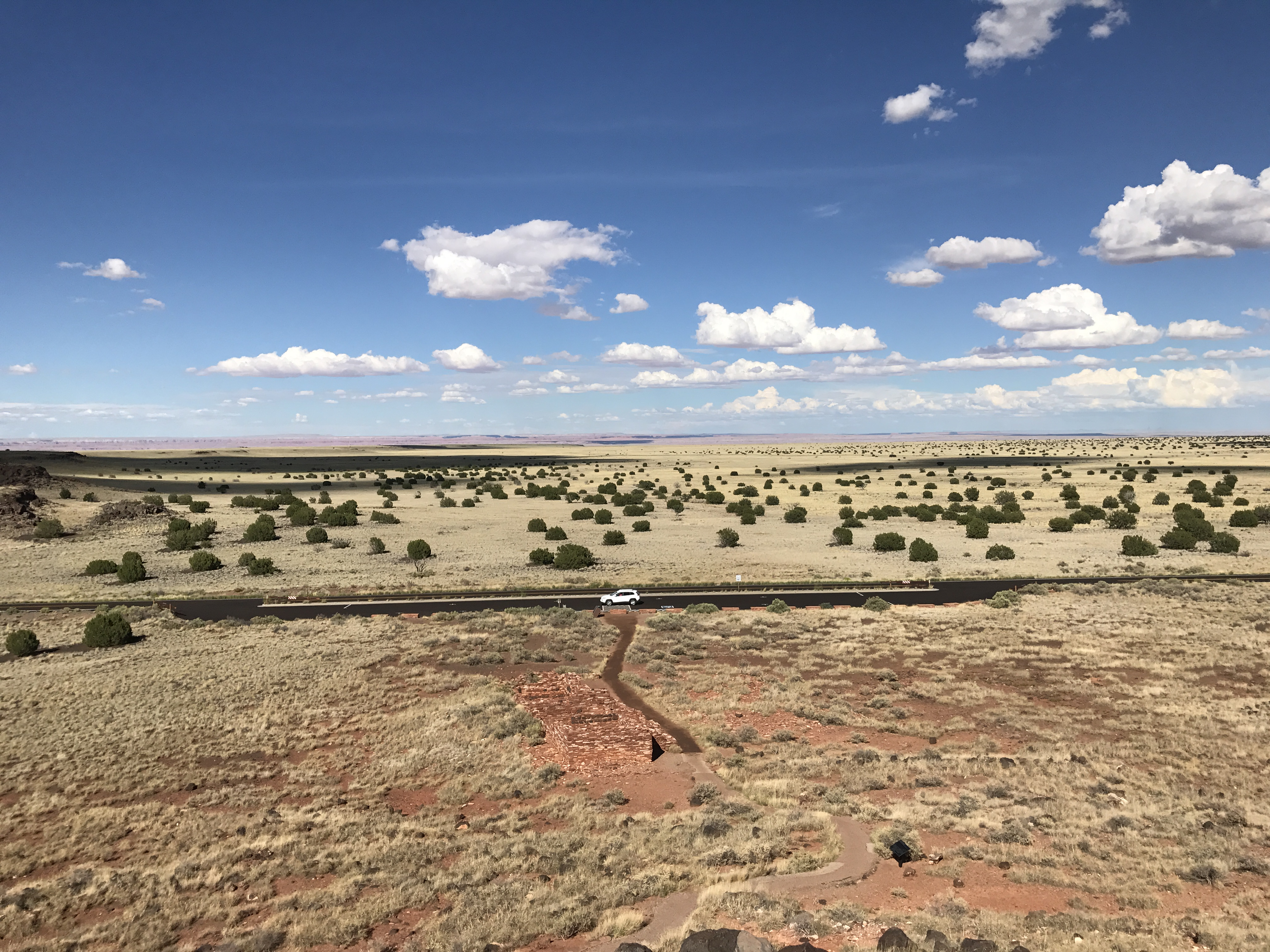
View from atop Citadel Pueblo

Amidst what would seem a generally inhospitable area due to the lack of food and water sources, several artifacts have been located at the site from distant locations, implying that the people who inhabited Wupatki were involved in trade. During numerous excavations stretching back to the site' exploration in the mid-1800s, items from as far as the Pacific and the Gulf Coasts have been located at the site, such as many different varieties of pottery and seashells.

In 2016, Wupatki NM, along with Walnut Canyon National Monument and Sunset Crater Volcano NM, was designated an International Dark Sky Park by DarkSky International, in recognition of the quality of the star-filled night sky and commitment to reducing light pollution.

Wupatki Sites

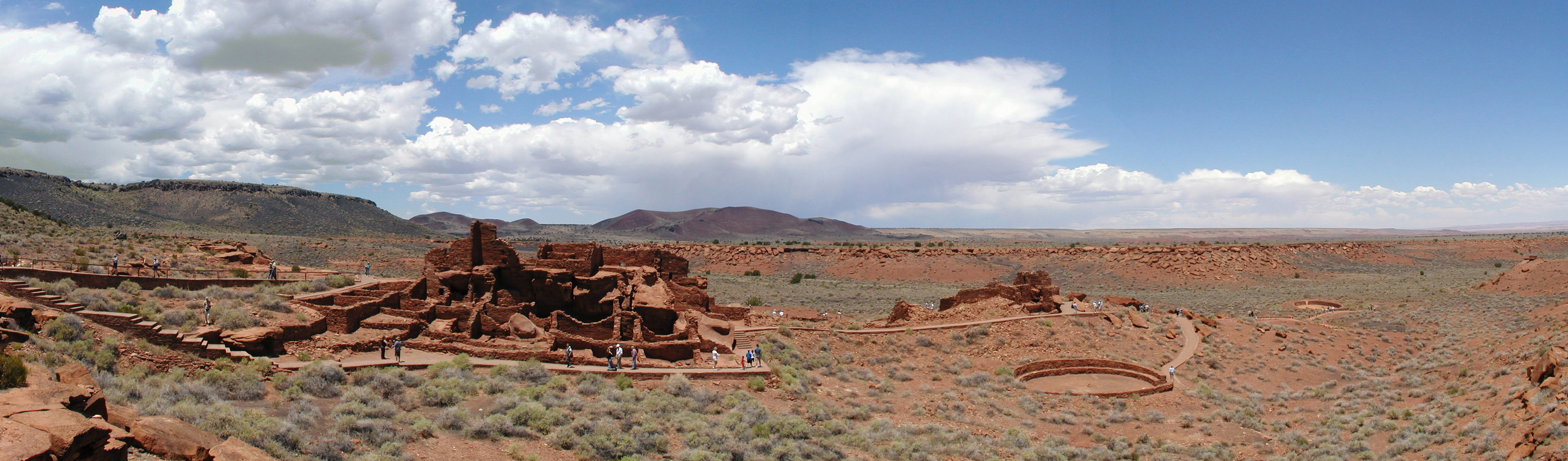
Wupatki Paronama

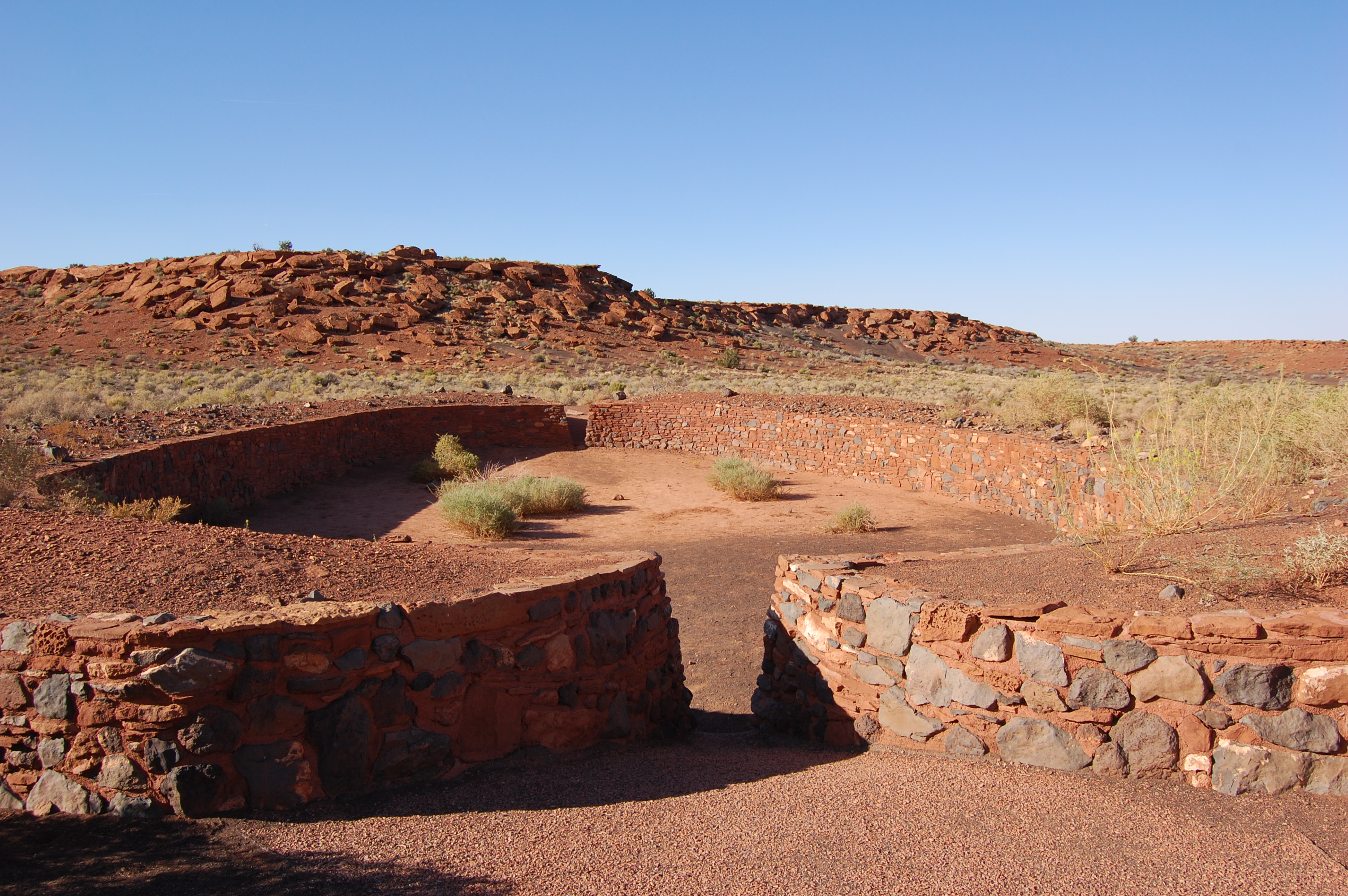
Wupatki Ball Court

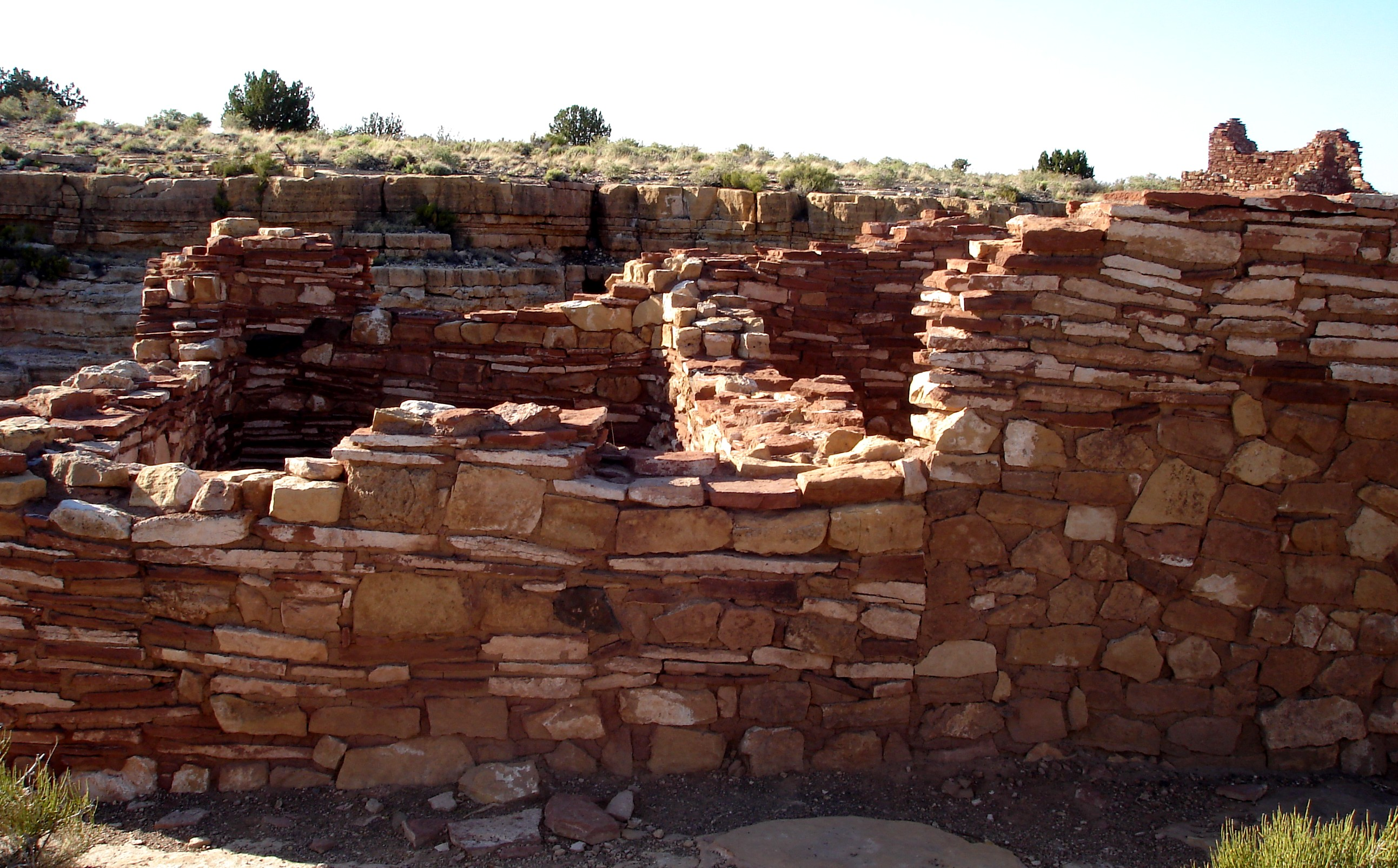
Box Canyon

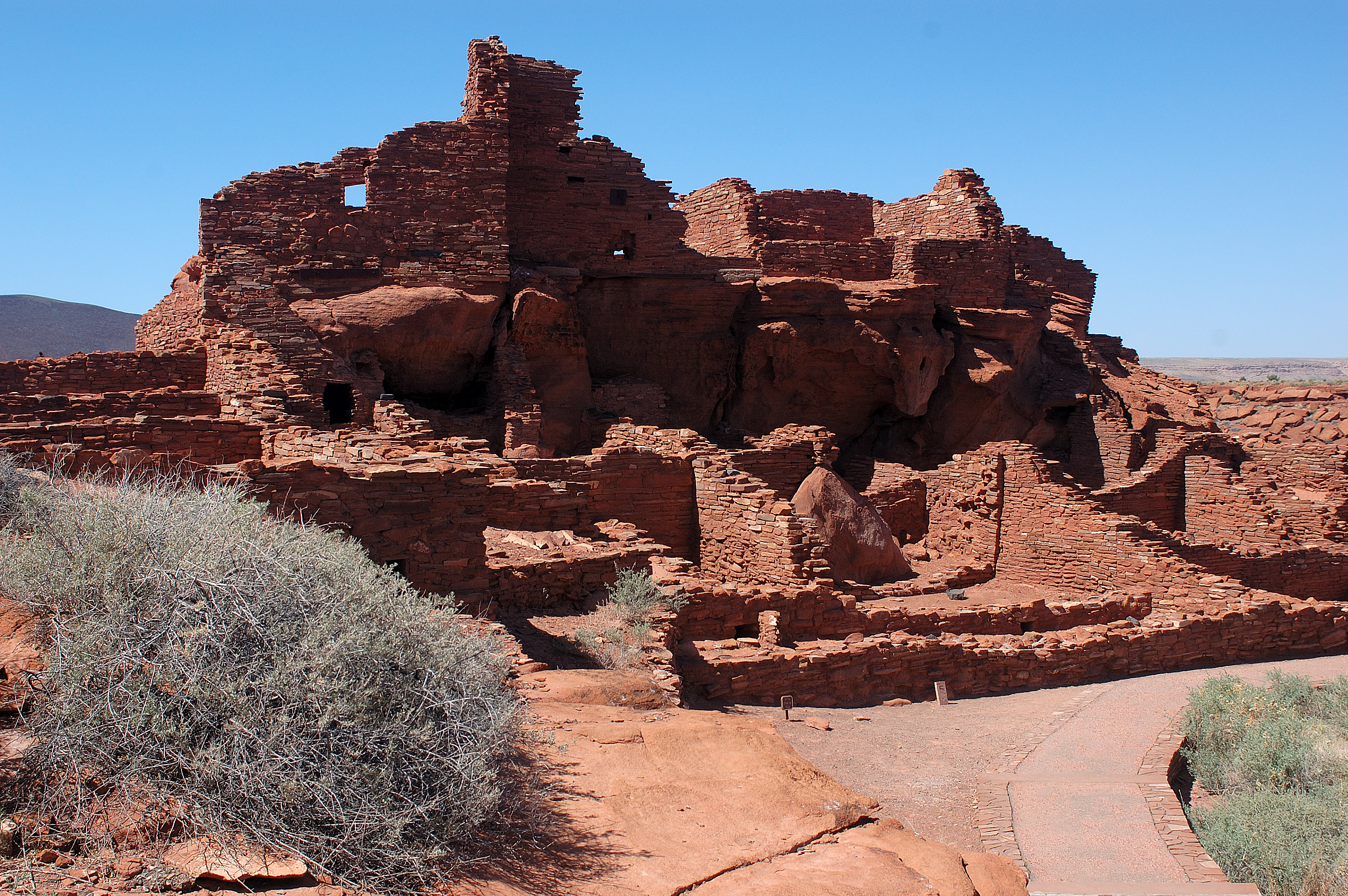
Wupatki Pueblo

== Climate ==
Wupatki has a dry climate, classified by the Köppen climate classification system as a borderline semi-arid climate and arid climate (BSk/BWk). Wupatki has cold winters and hot summers.

Studies have been conducted to compare the climate of Wupatki in the 12th and 13th century, to the 20th century. The findings show that there has been very little change to the climate in the last 2,000 years.

Climate data for Wupatki National Monument, Arizona, 1991–2020 normals, extremes 1940–present
Month	Jan	Feb	Mar	Apr	May	Jun	Jul	Aug	Sep	Oct	Nov	Dec	Year
Record high °F (°C)	76 (24)	77 (25)	85 (29)	92 (33)	101 (38)	107 (42)	109 (43)	106 (41)	102 (39)	93 (34)	82 (28)	72 (22)	109 (43)
Mean maximum °F (°C)	61.7 (16.5)	67.7 (19.8)	76.7 (24.8)	84.7 (29.3)	91.5 (33.1)	101.3 (38.5)	103.4 (39.7)	99.7 (37.6)	94.6 (34.8)	85.9 (29.9)	72.7 (22.6)	62.1 (16.7)	104.0 (40.0)
Mean daily maximum °F (°C)	47.6 (8.7)	54.5 (12.5)	63.1 (17.3)	70.5 (21.4)	79.7 (26.5)	91.5 (33.1)	94.4 (34.7)	91.2 (32.9)	84.6 (29.2)	72.5 (22.5)	57.9 (14.4)	45.9 (7.7)	71.1 (21.7)
Daily mean °F (°C)	36.8 (2.7)	42.3 (5.7)	49.8 (9.9)	56.7 (13.7)	65.7 (18.7)	76.7 (24.8)	80.8 (27.1)	78.2 (25.7)	71.2 (21.8)	59.0 (15.0)	45.8 (7.7)	35.5 (1.9)	58.2 (14.6)
Mean daily minimum °F (°C)	26.0 (−3.3)	30.1 (−1.1)	36.4 (2.4)	42.9 (6.1)	51.6 (10.9)	61.9 (16.6)	67.1 (19.5)	65.2 (18.4)	57.7 (14.3)	45.6 (7.6)	33.7 (0.9)	25.2 (−3.8)	45.3 (7.4)
Mean minimum °F (°C)	14.8 (−9.6)	18.4 (−7.6)	24.5 (−4.2)	30.7 (−0.7)	38.1 (3.4)	49.8 (9.9)	59.2 (15.1)	57.8 (14.3)	46.5 (8.1)	32.3 (0.2)	20.7 (−6.3)	13.3 (−10.4)	11.5 (−11.4)
Record low °F (°C)	−4 (−20)	−2 (−19)	10 (−12)	14 (−10)	20 (−7)	30 (−1)	41 (5)	35 (2)	33 (1)	17 (−8)	7 (−14)	−5 (−21)	−5 (−21)
Average precipitation inches (mm)	0.68 (17)	0.51 (13)	0.60 (15)	0.41 (10)	0.40 (10)	0.12 (3.0)	1.59 (40)	1.47 (37)	0.99 (25)	0.68 (17)	0.48 (12)	0.58 (15)	8.51 (216)
Average snowfall inches (cm)	0.5 (1.3)	0.9 (2.3)	0.4 (1.0)	0.3 (0.76)	0.0 (0.0)	0.0 (0.0)	0.0 (0.0)	0.0 (0.0)	0.0 (0.0)	0.0 (0.0)	0.4 (1.0)	0.9 (2.3)	3.4 (8.6)
Average precipitation days (≥ 0.01 inch)	3.5	3.6	3.6	2.7	3.0	1.2	7.1	9.0	5.4	3.8	2.8	3.7	49.4
Average snowy days (≥ 0.1 inch)	0.7	0.6	0.2	0.2	0.0	0.0	0.0	0.0	0.0	0.0	0.2	0.7	2.6
Source: NOAA

== Geology ==
Wupatki National Monument has a geological history that goes back millions of years, prior to when people lived in the area. The monument has sedimentary rocks from the Permian and Triassic periods laying beneath it in layers. According to the National Park Service, the most prominent of these are the Kaibab Limestone and Moenkopi formations. Even though the area is now dry, there is evidence such as ripple marks in sandstone, cracks in ancient mud, and the remains of marine organisms that shows how water once played a role in shaping the landscape. The National Park Service states that the western edge of North America began to fold and buckle roughly 80 million years ago. Faults and folds in the rock layers show this geological change. These changes, along with erosion from wind and water, created the landscape of the monument today.

The area's geology also shaped the lives of the people who lived there thousands of years ago. Certain kinds of rocks, such as chert, were used to construct tools. Various tribes have utilized the land in Wupatki and its materials over the last 13,000 years. The natural cracks in the rock formed as the ground shifted. The layers of stone broke apart.

Wupatki contains a system of blowholes and underground fissures. A fault runs through the area's limestone and sandstone. This allowed water to enter the rock and dissolve parts of the limestone over time.This created a network of openings that stretches for several miles underground. There are parts of the system that have not been mapped yet due to the fact that some of the passages are too narrow for scientists to enter. Researchers J.D. Sartor and D.L Lamar from the RAND corporation sought to find the total volume of the underground space. By measuring airflow through a blowhole, using tracers to track air movement between blowholes in the area, conducting a gravity survey, and comparing their findings with the area's known geology, they found that blowholes 24 miles apart were interconnected. They also found that the underground system has a volume of 7 billion cubic feet.

Blowholes are different from other cracks in the ground because they connect to underground openings. This means they allow air to move in and out. Changes in air pressure and temperature affect how the air moves. For example, a blowhole may release cool air during a warm day or draw air inward when conditions outside change. A story from the Hopi tribe recorded by Edmund Nequatewa in 1947 describes Yaponcha, the wind god, as living in a fissure in the rock near Sunset Crater.

Earth-cracks can form when rock layers shift, settle, or break apart, but they do not always connect to the underground system. Researchers from the Museum of Northern Arizona have studied these features to better understand how they formed with the surrounding area's landscape.

== See also ==
- List of national monuments of the United States
