= Mike Snow =

Mike or Michael Snow may refer to:

- Michael Snow (1928–2023), Canadian visual artist
- Mike Snow (politician) (born 1947), member of the Georgia House of Representatives
- Mike Snow (auto racer) in 1992 Indy Lights season
- Michael Snow, competitor from Survivor: Caramoan (2013)
- Michael Snow, founder of The Signpost and former WMF Board member
- Mike Snow, guitarist in The Generators
- Michael Snow, character in I Do! I Do!

== See also ==
- Miike Snow, a Swedish indie pop band
- Miike Snow (album), Miike Snow's first album
- Mike Snoei (born 1963), Dutch football player and manager
