= George Snow =

George Snow may refer to:

- George Snow (bishop) (1903–1977), British schoolmaster and Anglican bishop
- George A. Snow (1923–2020), Canadian politician
- George W. Snow (1842–1927), American politician, lieutenant governor of South Dakota
- George Snow (footballer) (1910–1977), English footballer

== See also ==
- George Snow Hill (1898–1969), American painter and sculptor
