= Thomas Snow =

Thomas Snow may refer to:

- Thomas Snow (British Army officer) (1858–1940)
- Thomas Maitland Snow, British diplomat
- Tom Snow (born 1947), American songwriter
- Icicle (comics) or Thomas Snow, a fictional character in the television series The Flash
