= William Snow =

William Snow may refer to:

- William W. Snow (1812–1886), U.S. Representative from New York
- William Snow (actor) (born 1960), Australian actor
- William P. Snow (1907–1986), U.S. Ambassador to Burma and Paraguay
- William B. Snow (1903–1968), American Acoustical engineer
- William J. Snow (1868–1947), United States Army general
- William Parker Snow (1817–1895), Arctic explorer, writer, and mariner
- William Snow (priest), Dean of Bristol, 1542–1551
- William Snow, painter of the dome of St Mary Abchurch in London
- William Freeman Snow, Stanford University professor affiliated with formation of the American Social Health Association
