= Charles E. Snow =

American anthropologist

Charles Ernest Snow
- Born: 11 April 1910; Boulder, Colorado, U.S.
- Died: 5 October 1967 (aged 57); Madison, Wisconsin, U.S.
- Education: University of Colorado Boulder; Harvard University
- Occupation: Anthropologist

Charles Ernest Snow (11 April 1910 – 5 October 1967) was an American anthropologist.

== Career ==
Born in Boulder, Colorado, Snow attended the University of Colorado Boulder and Harvard University. He assisted in a Bureau of Home Economics study examining growth patterns in young children. He then worked on an archaeological project with the Tennessee Valley Authority under William Snyder Webb; after the beginning of the Second World War ended the project, Webb hired Snow at the University of Kentucky Museum, and later in the anthropology and anatomy departments. The two co-wrote The Adena People, "one of the major publications one eastern United States archaeology" at the time. Snow received a Civilian Meritorious Service Award in 1948 for his work with the War Department and the American Graves Registration Service.

== Death ==
Snow had a heart attack while on vacation in Wisconsin. He was hospitalized at Madison General Hospital, where he had a second attack and died.
