= Leslie Snow =

Leslie Snow may refer to:

- Leslie Perkins Snow (1862–1934), justice of the New Hampshire Supreme Court
- Leslie Snow (athlete) (1907–1995), English athlete who competed in the javelin at the 1930 British Empire Games
