= John Snow (disambiguation) =

John Snow (1813–1858) was an English physician and epidemiologist.

John Snow may also refer to:

== People ==
- John Snow (cricketer) (born 1941), English cricketer
- John J. Snow Jr. (born 1945), American politician, former member of the North Carolina Senate
- John James Snow Jr. (born 1929), American politician, former member of the South Carolina House of Representatives
- John W. Snow (born 1939), American politician, 73rd United States Secretary of the Treasury
- John Snow (MP) (died 1607/08), English politician

== Other uses ==
- John Snow, Inc, public health research/consulting firm

== See also ==
- Jon Snow (disambiguation)
- Jack Snow (disambiguation)
