= Gordon Snow =

Gordon Snow may refer to:

- Gordon E. Snow (born 1946), Utah politician
- Gordon M. Snow, FBI executive
