= Peter Snow (disambiguation) =

Peter Snow (born 1938) is a British television and radio presenter.

Peter Snow may also refer to:

- Peter Snow (priest) (died 1598), English Roman Catholic priest and Roman Catholic martyr
- Peter Snow (doctor) (1934–2006), New Zealand general practitioner
- Peter Snow (artist) (1927–2008), English painter, theatre designer and teacher
- P. J. Snow (born 1948), neuroscientist

== See also ==
- Peter Snowe (1943–1973), American politician
