= Wet Beaver Wilderness =

Protected area in the Coconino National Forest

- IUCN category Ib (wilderness area)
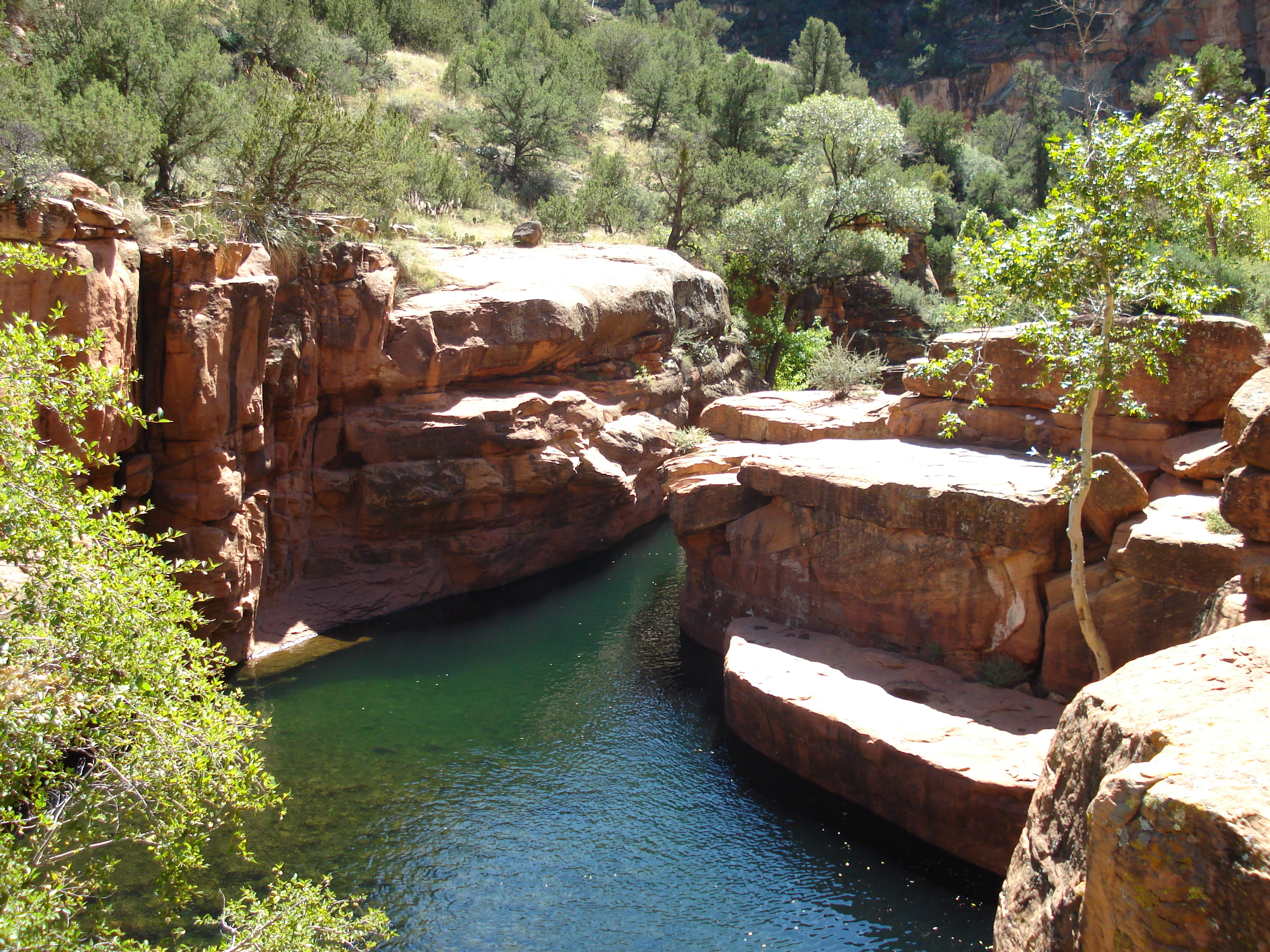
- Wet Beaver Creek
- Interactive map of Wet Beaver Wilderness
- Location: Yavapai / Coconino counties, Arizona, United States
- Nearest city: Lake Montezuma, AZ
- Coordinates: 34°40′29″N 111°38′12″W
- Area: 6,155 acres (2,491 ha)
- Established: 1984
- Governing body: U.S. Forest Service

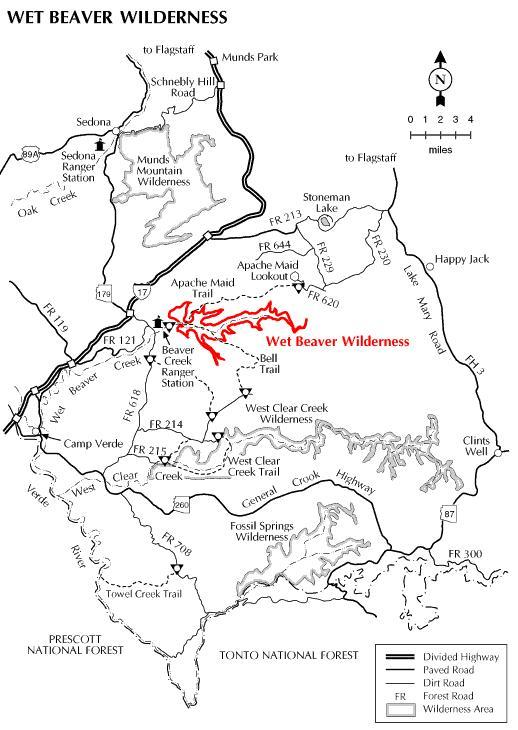
Wet Beaver Wilderness map

Wet Beaver Wilderness is a 6,155-acre (2,491 ha) wilderness area located in the Coconino National Forest in the U.S. state of Arizona.

Wet Beaver Creek is a perennial stream with one major tributary, Dry Beaver Creek. The confluence of the two is at McGuireville, Arizona. Beaver Creek flows past Montezuma Well and Montezuma Castle before joining the Verde River near Camp Verde, Arizona.

== Wildlife ==
The year-round waters in the Wet Beaver Wilderness attract large numbers of wildlife, including elk, deer, bear, mountain lion, and a variety of smaller mammals, reptiles, and birds.

== Trails ==
The main trailhead to reach the Wet Beaver Wilderness, the 10.8-mile (17.4 km) Bell Trail, is located approximately 2 miles (3 km) east of the Sedona exit from I-17, near the Beaver Creek Ranger Station. The Bell Trail is a historic stock trail, which follows Beaver Creek upstream for about 3 miles (5 km) before climbing steeply up to the Mogollon Rim at the southern edge of the Colorado Plateau. The only other trail in the Wilderness is the 9.5-mile (15.3 km) Apache Maid Trail.

== Recreation ==
Common recreational activities in the Wet Beaver Wilderness include hiking, horseback riding, fishing (about 12 fishable miles), swimming, wildlife watching, and photography. The popular Beaver Creek campground, located outside the Wilderness at the creek crossing just below the ranger station, is operated by the US Forest Service and requires a fee.

Overnight camping is prohibited by Forest Order between the parking area at the west end of the canyon, near the old Forest Service Ranger Station and the Campground, and continuing upstream (east) to a signed point approximately one-quarter mile upstream from where the Bell Trail (FT #13) crosses Wet Beaver Creek. This closure has been established to reduce the impact the area has received in recent years.

== Fish species ==
- Rainbow trout
- Brown trout
- Smallmouth bass
- Bullfrogs

== See also ==
- V Bar V Heritage Site – one-half mile west
- List of Arizona Wilderness Areas
- List of U.S. Wilderness Areas
- Wilderness Act
