= Jon Snow =

Jon Snow may refer to:

- Jon Snow (journalist) (born 1947), British newscaster
- Jon Snow (character), character from George R. R. Martin's novel series A Song of Ice and Fire

== See also ==
- John Snow (disambiguation)
- Jack Snow (disambiguation)
