= Hopi House =

- U.S. National Historic Landmark District – Contributing property
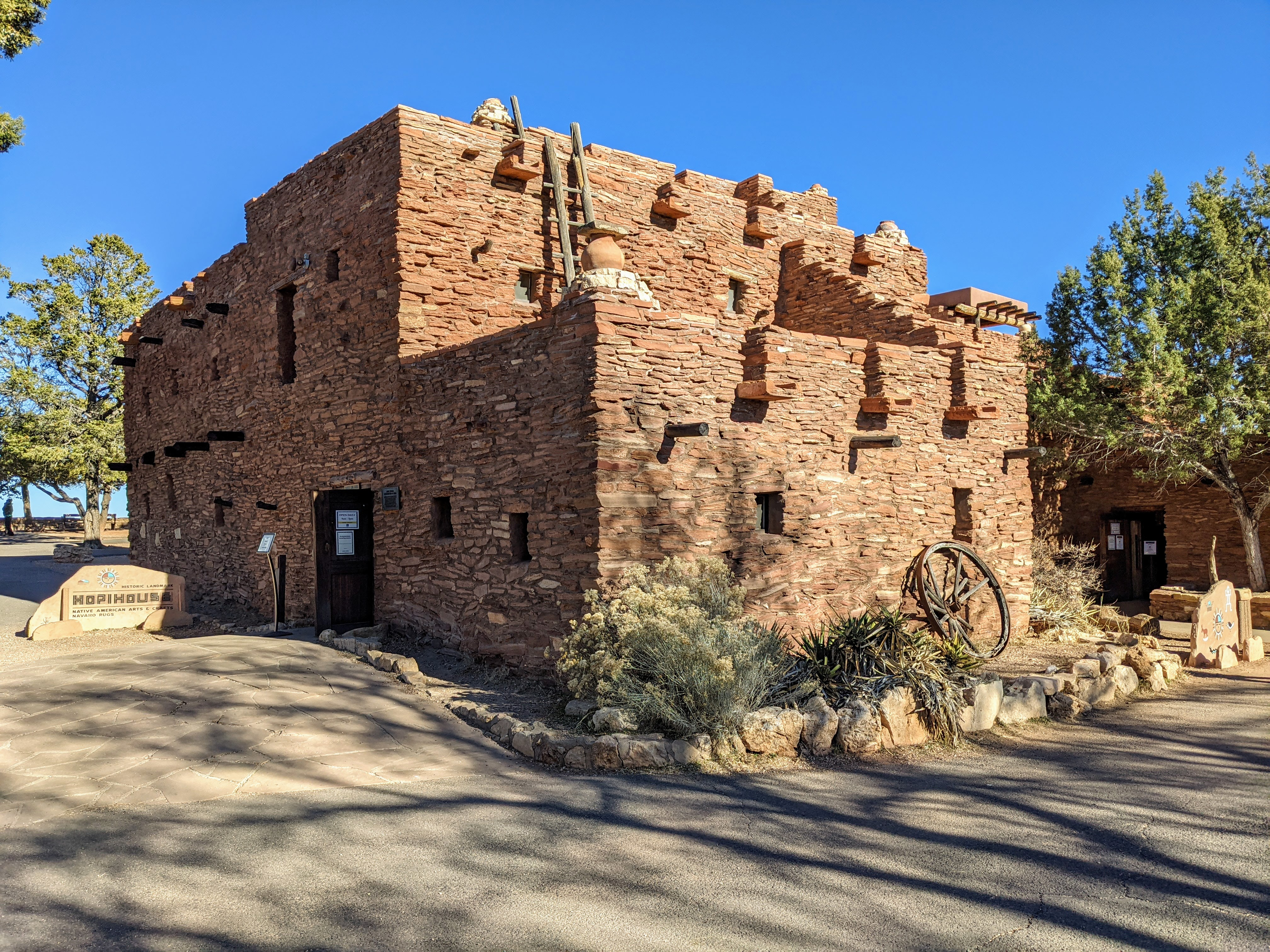

- Location within Arizona Location within the United States
- Location: Grand Canyon National Park, Arizona
- Coordinates: 36°3′28″N 112°8′12″W
- Area: less than one acre
- Built: 1904
- Architect: Mary Colter
- Part of: Mary Jane Colter buildings (ID87001436)

Significant dates
- Added to NRHP: May 28, 1987
- Designated NHLDCP: May 28, 1987

Hopi House is located on the South Rim of the Grand Canyon, within Grand Canyon National Park in the U.S. state of Arizona. Built in 1904 as concessioner facilities at the South Rim were being developed, it is the first of eight projects at the Grand Canyon that were designed by architect Mary Colter, along with Bright Angel Lodge, Hermit's Rest, Lookout Studio, Phantom Ranch, Desert View Watchtower, Colter Hall and Victor Hall, (the latter two being employee dormitories). Hopi House was built by the Fred Harvey Company as a market for Native American crafts, made by artisans on the site. The Hopi, as the historic inhabitants of the area, were chosen as the featured artisans, and the building was designed to closely resemble a traditional Hopi pueblo. Hopi House opened on January 1, 1905, two weeks before the El Tovar Hotel, located just to the west, was opened.

== Design ==
Mary Colter had worked on a number of projects for the Fred Harvey Company, principally as an architect and interior designer. She was particularly successful in a similar project, the Indian Building at the Fred Harvey Company's Alvarado Hotel (now demolished) in Albuquerque, New Mexico. Colter planned Hopi House as a sort of living museum, in which Hopi Indians could live while making and selling traditional crafts. The structure was based on Colter's interpretation of the Hopi dwelling at Oraibi, Arizona. In 1904, ethnologist and missionary Heinrich R. Voth, who had lived among the Hopi from 1893 to 1902, was hired to collaborate with Colter. He may have also overseen the construction of the site, as Colter lived in St. Paul at the time. The ethnohistorically-correct structure was at the time of its construction the first introduction for many park visitors to the architecture and life of the native peoples of Arizona, New Mexico, Utah and Colorado. A variety of interior spaces provide museum, sales and demonstration space.

== Description ==
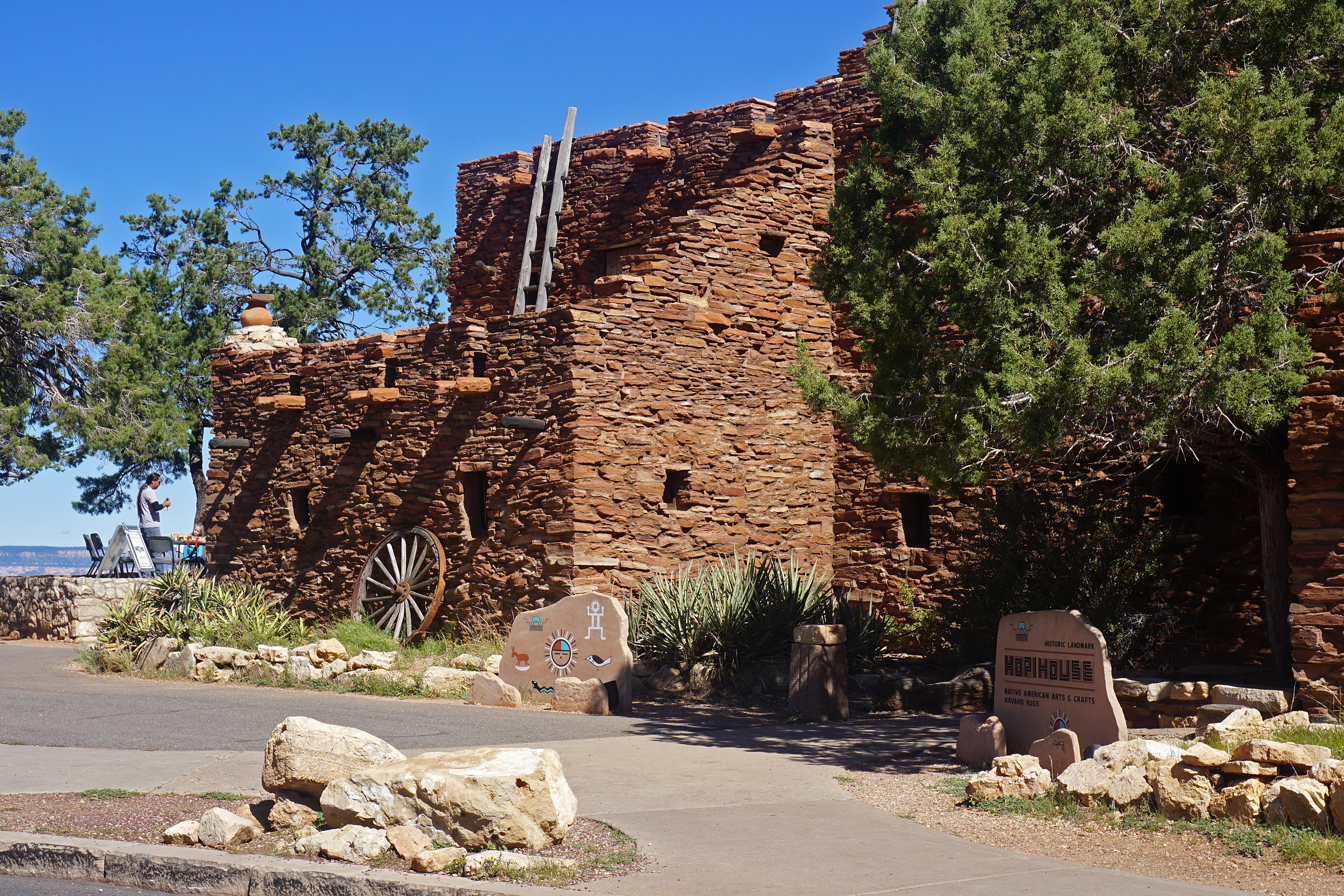
Front view of the Hopi House

Hopi House is a stepped structure executed in sandstone of varying size, texture and coursing. The roof surfaces function as terraces in the same manner as traditional Hopi dwellings. Windows are small and sparse, with doorways on the same small scale. Interior walls are plastered with adobe, while ceilings are composed of saplings, twigs and grass covered with mud. Fireplaces are located in the corners of rooms. The old staircase to the second floor is decorated with murals by an unknown Hopi artist. The second floor houses a shrine, called a kiva, with Hopi religious artifacts. Floors on the second floor were made to look like adobe but were actually cement, which later in the 1930s the floor was laid with hard wood flooring. The third floor was used as an apartment for the building's former managers. It has since been updated and is now used as storage but a number of original features have been preserved. Most of the original furnishings in the main level, picked out by Colter, have been preserved.

== Historic designation ==
Hopi House is a component of the multi-site Mary Jane Colter Buildings National Historic Landmark, It was incorporated into the National Historic Landmark group on May 28, 1987. Hopi House and the Lookout Studio are also major contributing structures in the Grand Canyon Village National Historic Landmark District.
