= Buckey O'Neill Cabin =

National Historic Place at the Grand Canyon

- U.S. National Register of Historic Places
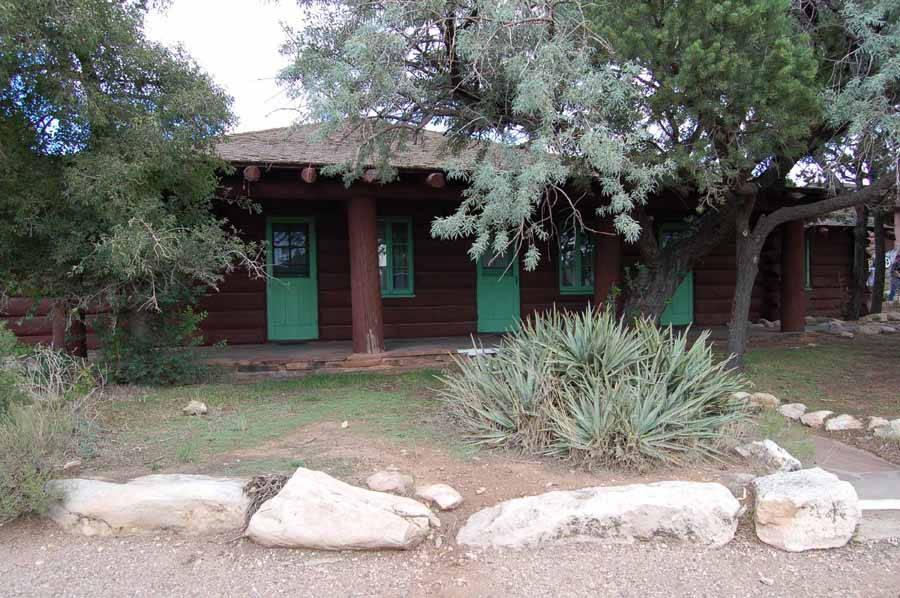

- Location within Arizona Location within the United States
- Location: Off AZ 64 in Grand Canyon National Park, Grand Canyon, Arizona
- Coordinates: 36°3′26.64″N 112°8′28.20″W
- Built: 1895
- NRHP reference No.: 75000227
- Added to NRHP: October 29, 1975

The Buckey O'Neill Cabin was built in 1890 by William "Buckey" O'Neill in what would become Grand Canyon National Park. O'Neill was, among many other things, a member of Theodore Roosevelt's Rough Riders, who had previously been an author, sheriff, and a judge in his native Arizona. He was killed in action in Cuba in 1898, but was instrumental in establishing what would eventually become the Grand Canyon Railroad and Grand Canyon National Park.

The cabin is the oldest extant structure on the South Rim. It was used as an office for tourist accommodations in the area during the 1890s, which eventually evolved into the Bright Angel Hotel. After the hotel was sold to the Fred Harvey Company it remained much as it was when built. It was incorporated into the rebuilt Bright Angel Lodge complex by Mary Jane Colter in 1935.

The one-story cabin is a wood-frame structure on a low stone foundation, right on the edge of the Grand Canyon. The shallow-pitched roof is covered with wood shingles. The cabin is connected to other lodge buildings using compatible, unobtrusive materials, and has been cited as an early example of an adaptive reuse of a historic structure. The cabin is one of the guest accommodations of the Bright Angel Lodge.

The Buckey O'Neill Cabin was individually listed on the National Register of Historic Places on October 29, 1975. It is included in the Grand Canyon Village National Historic Landmark District.
