= Maswik Lodge =

Grand Canyon National Park lodge

Coordinates: 36.05344°N 112.14405°W

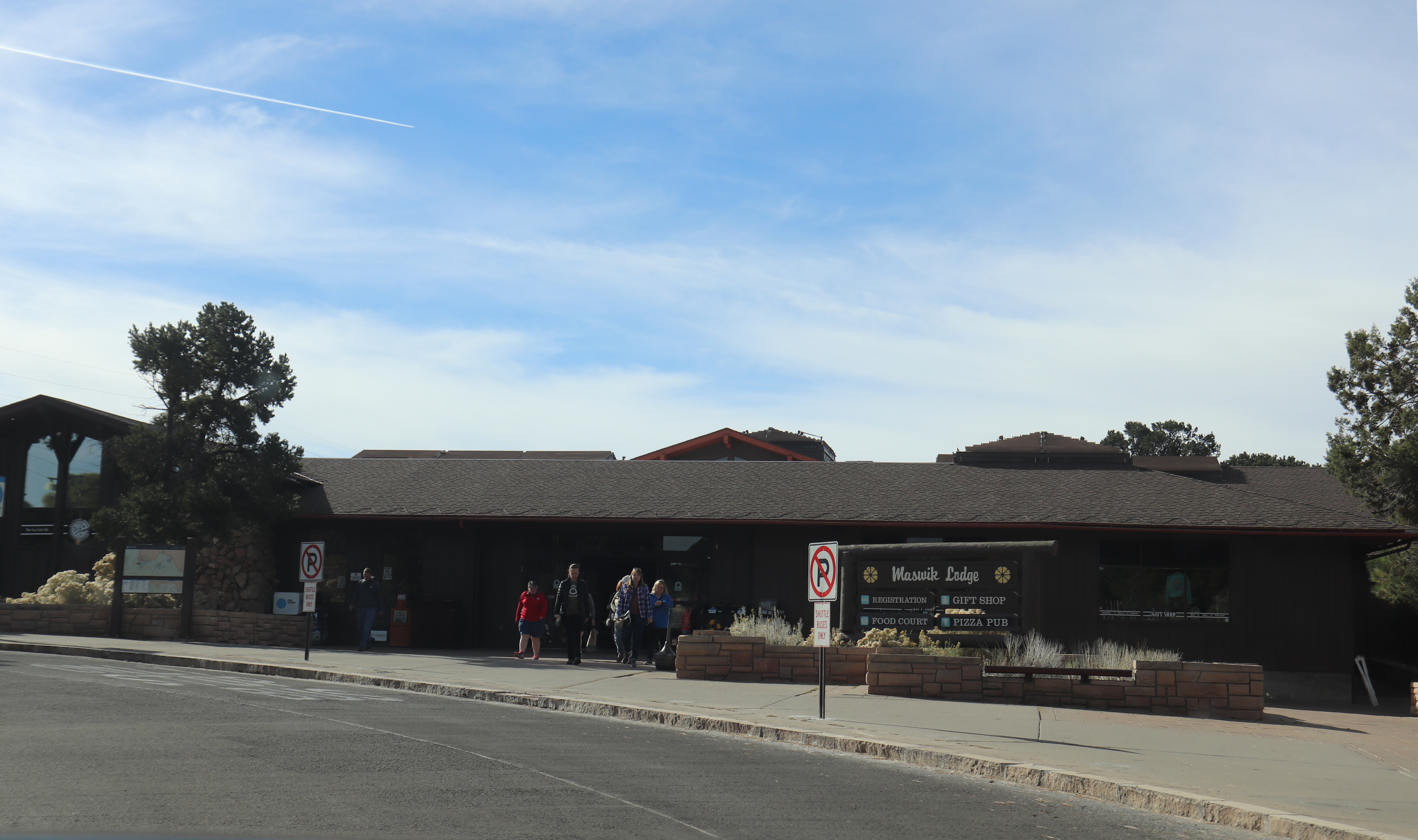
Maswik Lodge Cafeteria / Lounge in October 2018

Maswik Lodge is a lodge in Grand Canyon National Park that is run by Xanterra Parks & Resorts. It is named after a Hopi Kachina figure said to watch over the Grand Canyon. Maswik Lodge is located about 0.25 miles (0.40 km) from the South Rim of the Grand Canyon. It is on the west side of Grand Canyon Village. The lodge contains a cafeteria, lounge, and many spread out room complexes.

== History ==
The lodge began in 1927 as a Fred Harvey hotel for drivers of their own automobiles (as opposed to most of the travelers who arrived on rail or stage coaches). In the 1940s, 20 new buildings were added along with moving 22 buildings from Bright Angel Lodge. Most of the original buildings were removed in 1971 and replaced with a more modern motel structure. In 2018, the park considered demolishing all of the existing buildings.

Fodor's review of the lodge noted pros: "well-equipped northern units, good for families, and affordable dining." Fodor's review noted cons of: "rooms lack historic charm, tucked away from the rim in the forest, and south units don't have air conditioning."
