= Desert View Watchtower =

- Desert View Watchtower Historic District
- U.S. National Register of Historic Places
- U.S. Historic district
- U.S. National Historic Landmark District – Contributing property
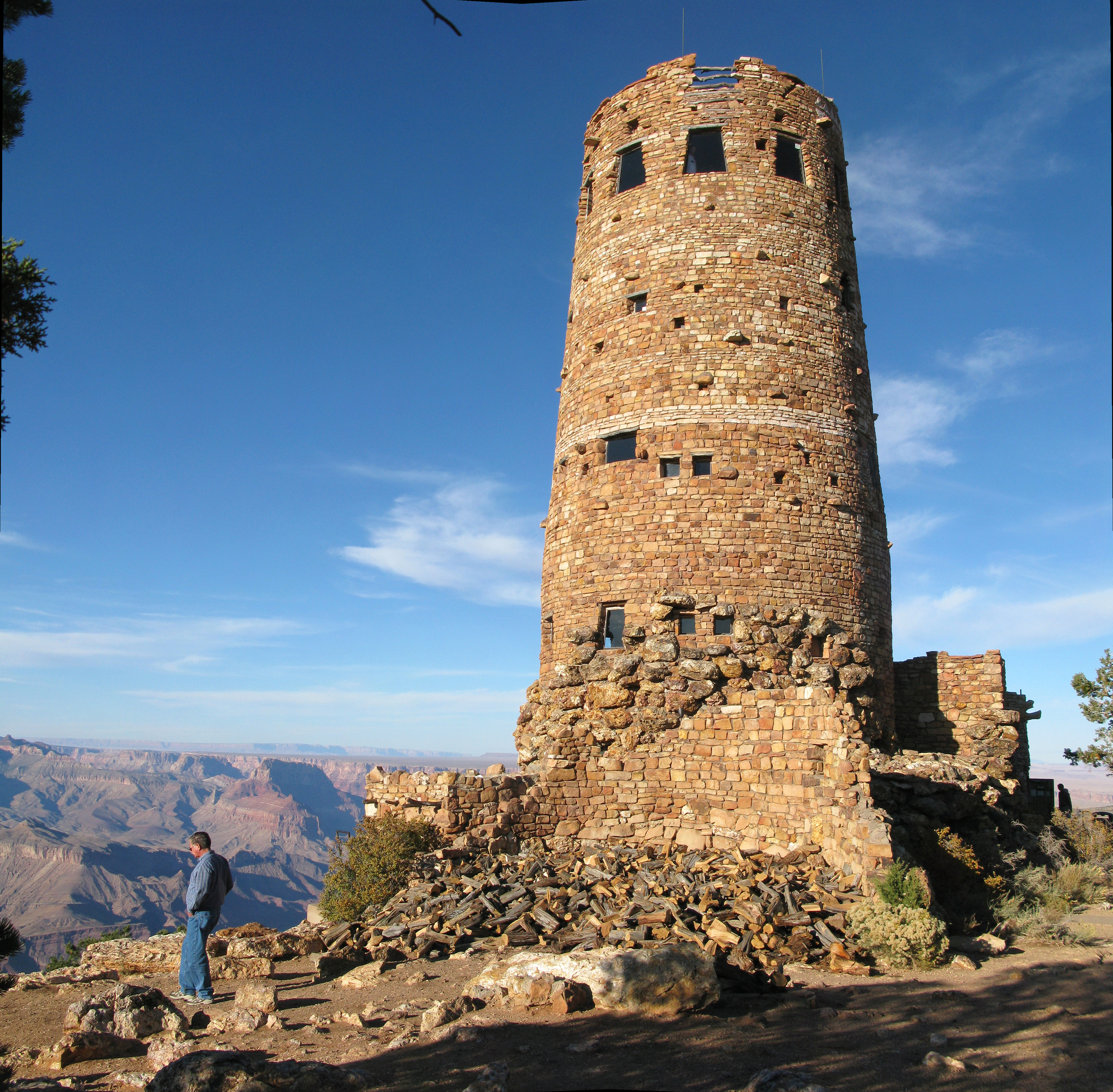
- Desert View Watchtower

- Location within Arizona Location within the United States
- Location: Grand Canyon National Park, Arizona
- Coordinates: 36°2′38″N 111°49′33″W
- Built: 1932
- Architect: Mary Colter, et al.
- Part of: Mary Jane Colter buildings (ID87001436)
- NRHP reference No.: 87001436

Significant dates
- Added to NRHP: January 3, 1995 (Desert View Watchtower HD)
- Designated NHLDCP: May 28, 1987

Desert View Watchtower, also known as the Indian Watchtower at Desert View, is a 70-foot (21 m)-high stone building located on the South Rim of the Grand Canyon within Grand Canyon National Park in Arizona, United States. The tower is located at Desert View, more than 20 miles (32 km) to the east of the main developed area at Grand Canyon Village, toward the east entrance to the park. The four-story structure, completed in 1932, was designed by American architect Mary Colter, an employee of the Fred Harvey Company who also created and designed many other buildings in the Grand Canyon vicinity including Hermit's Rest and the Lookout Studio. The interior contains murals by Fred Kabotie.

== Description ==
The watchtower was the last of the series of Mary Colter-designed visitor concession structures at the Grand Canyon until her renovation of the Bright Angel Lodge in 1935. The tower was designed to resemble an Ancestral Puebloan watchtower, but its size dwarfs any known Pueblan-built tower. The closest prototypes for such a structure may be found at Hovenweep National Monument. The structure is composed of a circular coursed masonry tower rising from a rubble base. The base was intentionally designed to convey a partly ruinous appearance, perhaps of an older structure on which the watchtower was later built. The base is arranged within a large circle with the tower to the north. Tiny windows are irregularly disposed, some of which are themselves irregular in shape. The main space is the Kiva Room in the base structure, apparently roofed with logs that were salvaged from the old Grandview Hotel. The ceiling is a false structure concealing the roof structure that supports an observation deck. The Kiva Room features a fireplace with a large picture window directly above where the chimney would ordinarily go. Smoke is drawn away through an offset, concealed flue. The room still contains its original furnishings, which are part of the historic designation. A separate, apparently ruinous structure was actually built in that form to provide a storage place for firewood.

The tower rises as an open shaft lined by circular balconies overlooking the central space. Access from balcony to balcony is provided by small stairways. At the top the space is decked over, creating an enclosed observation level with large glazed windows. An open observation area on the roof of this space is now closed to visitors and is used for radio equipment. The steel and concrete structure of the observation level is concealed behind plaster, stone and wood. The tower is decorated by bold murals by Fred Kabotie, with other, petroglyph-style decorations by Fred Geary. Small windows in the tower's shaft let beams of light into the lower space. The tower also features a number of "reflectoscopes" – black mirrors to reflect the view of the canyon in a more abstract style, providing visitors an alternative view of the Canyon.

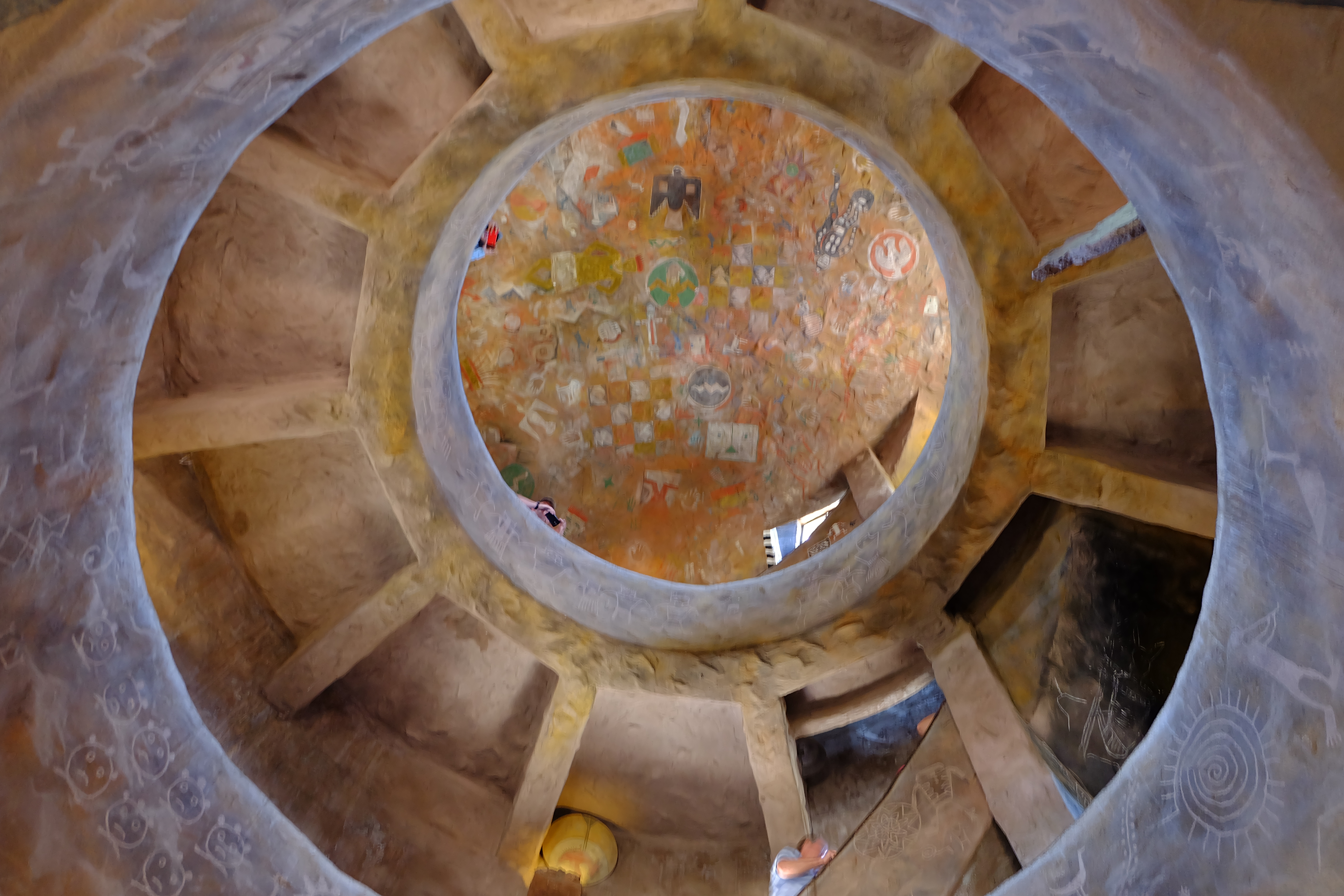
Interior view looking up from the second floor.

== Design ==
Mary Colter spent six months researching archeological prototypes and construction techniques before building a model of the site, studying the design of the tower using clay. Before the final design was completed Colter had a 70-foot (21 m) platform built to assess the views from the proposed site. Engineering was provided by the Atchison, Topeka & Santa Fe Railway. Colter was responsible for selecting Kabotie and Geary to decorate the interior. Geary's rock art paintings are copies of now-destroyed petroglyphs at Abo, New Mexico, and may be their only surviving representation.

== Historic district ==
In addition to its individual designation as part of the M.E.J. Colter Buildings National Historic Landmark, the Watchtower is part of the Desert View Watchtower Historic District, which includes a number of support structures built and used by the Fred Harvey Company, and later used by the National Park Service. Significant buildings include the Desert View Caretaker's Residence (1930), the oldest extant structure in the area. This rustic stone and wood house was initially built as a rest stop for Harveycar tours right on the canyon rim, and was moved to its present location when the Watchtower was built. Fred Kabotie may have lived here while he was the Watchtower's caretaker. Several other buildings, including cabins, sheds and a comfort station are included in the historic district.

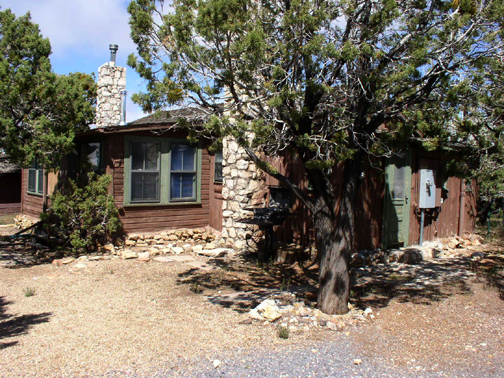
Desert View Caretaker's Residence

== Historic designation ==
The bottom floor of the tower now contains a gift shop while the upper floors serve as an observation deck from which visitors to the national park can view eastern portions of the Grand Canyon.

In 2008, two tourists were banned from all American national parks for the period of a year after using white-out and permanent marker to correct the punctuation on a sign on the Desert View Watchtower, which had been painted by Colter.

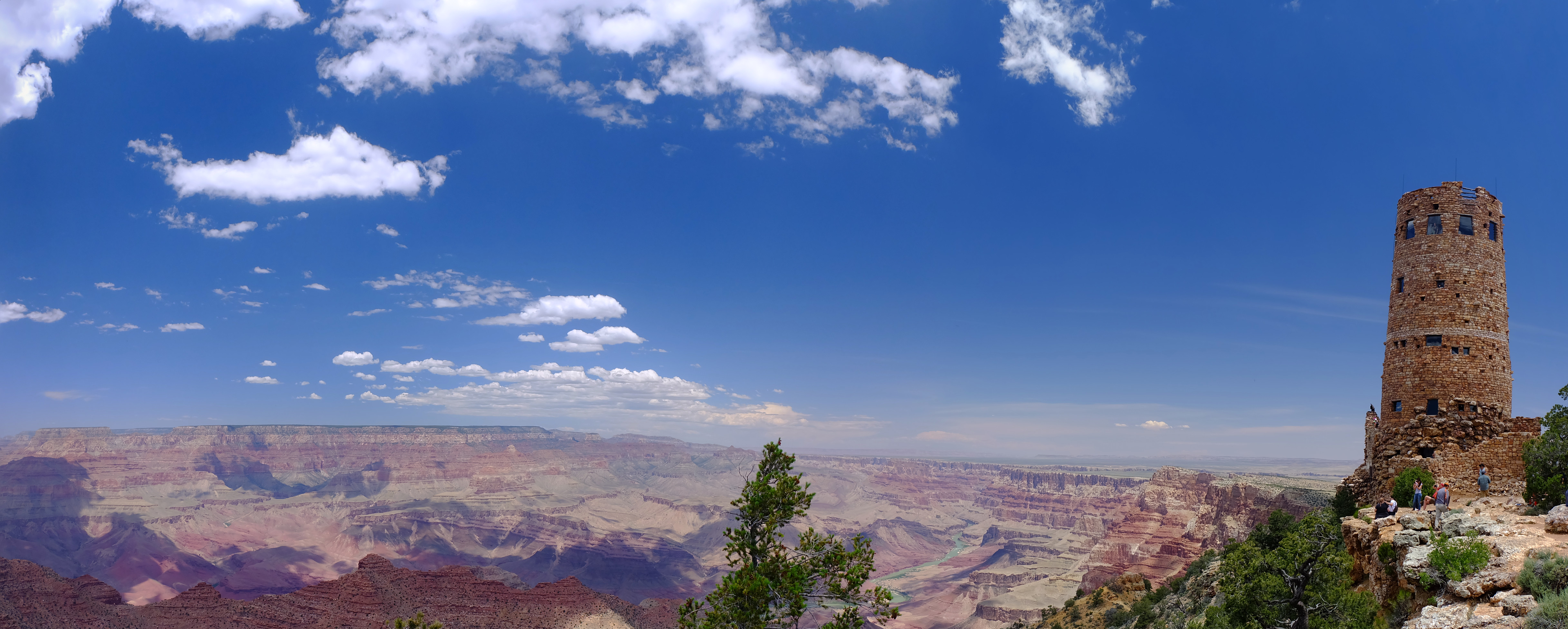
Panorama of Watchtower and surrounding Grand Canyon
