= Lookout Studio =

- U.S. National Historic Landmark District – Contributing property
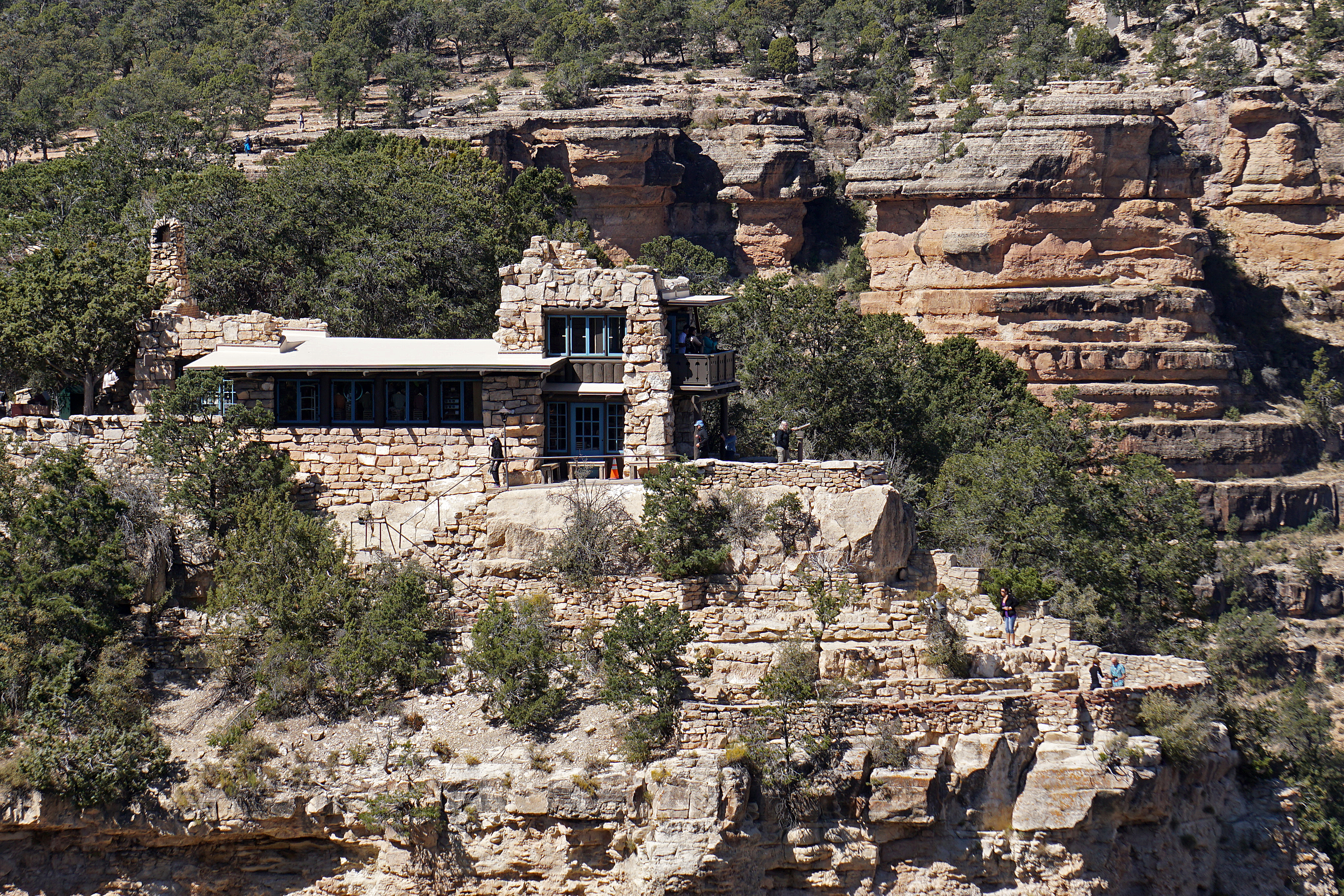
- Lookout Studio, 2017

- Location within Arizona Location within the United States
- Location: Grand Canyon National Park, Arizona
- Coordinates: 36°3′28.28″N 112°8′38.33″W
- Built: 1914
- Architect: Mary Colter
- Part of: Mary Jane Colter buildings (ID87001436)

Significant dates
- Added to NRHP: May 28, 1987
- Designated NHLDCP: May 28, 1987

Lookout Studio, known also as The Lookout, is a stone building located on the South Rim of the Grand Canyon, within Grand Canyon National Park in Arizona. It is part of the Grand Canyon Village Historic District, and is part of the Mary Jane Colter Buildings National Historic Landmark. It currently operates as a gift shop and observation station for visitors, with telescopes on its outdoor terrace. Lookout Studio was constructed by the Santa Fe Railway in 1914 and was established as a photography studio to compete with Kolb Studio. It is one of six buildings at the Grand Canyon that were designed by architect Mary Colter, along with Bright Angel Lodge, Hermit's Rest, Hopi House, Phantom Ranch, and Desert View Watchtower. Lookout Studio employs her signature rustic style of using jagged native rocks to imitate indigenous structures of the region and to blend in with the environment.

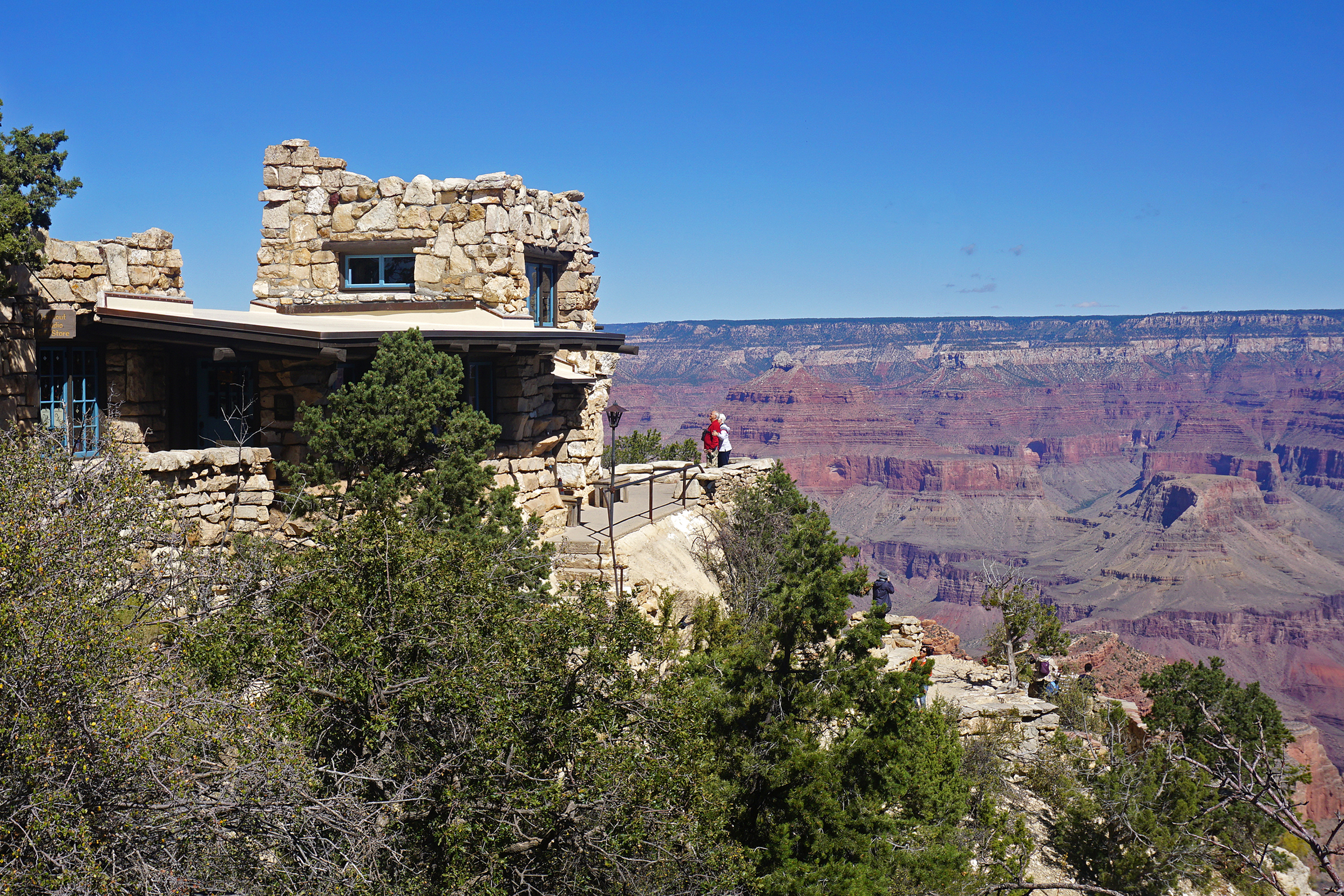
Side view of the Lookout Studio showing the multiple levels, faux ruins appearance, and banks of windows.

The rubble stone building is at the edge of the canyon. The walls rise to an irregular parapet which incorporates the building's chimneys. Before a roof replacement the roof carried a pile of stones designed to look like they had fallen into ruin. The lookout is on three levels, with a main level housing a shop and enclosed viewing area, a lower viewing platform and a small enclosed observation tower. The wood viga roof structure remains visible, although the structure has undergone other renovations. The lookout is unusually brightly lighted for a Colter building, since its interior receives a great deal of light through its banks of large windows.

== Historic designation ==
Lookout Studio is a component of the multi-site Mary Jane Colter Buildings National Historic Landmark, It was incorporated into the National Historic Landmark group on May 28, 1987. Hopi House and the Lookout Studio are also major contributing structures in the Grand Canyon Village National Historic Landmark District.
