= Mary Jane Colter buildings =

Buildings in Arizona, United States

- Mary Jane Colter Buildings
- U.S. National Register of Historic Places
- U.S. National Historic Landmark District
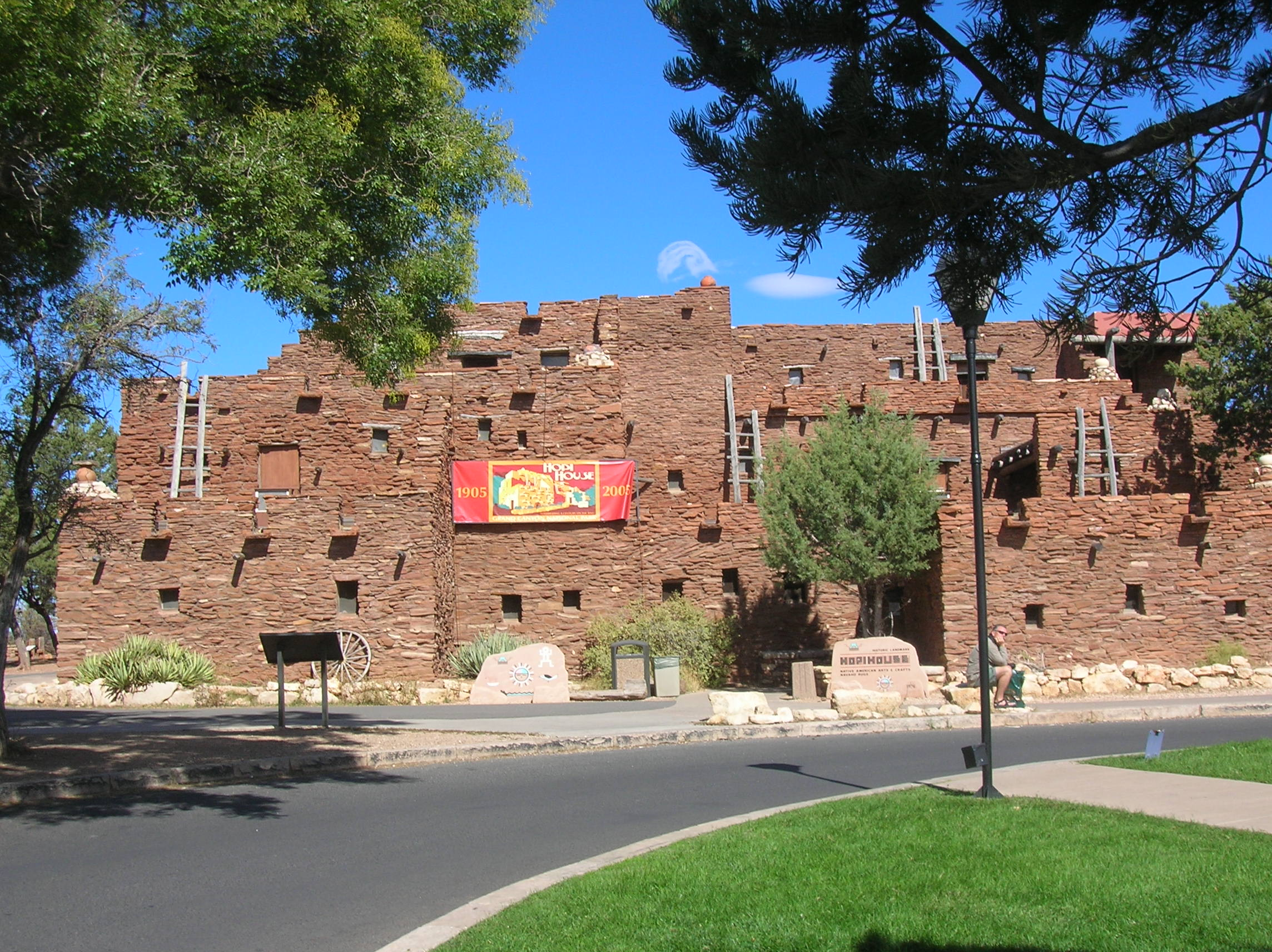
- Hopi House

- Location within Arizona Location within the United States
- Location: Grand Canyon National Park, Arizona
- Coordinates: 36°3′29″N 112°8′13″W
- Area: about 3 acres (1.2 ha)
- Built: 1904
- Architect: Mary Colter
- NRHP reference No.: 87001436

Significant dates
- Added to NRHP: May 28, 1987
- Designated NHLD: May 28, 1987

The Mary Jane Colter Buildings are four structures at Grand Canyon National Park designed by Mary Colter. Built between 1905 and 1932, the four buildings (Hermits Rest (1914), Desert View Watchtower (1932), Lookout Studio (1914), and Hopi House (1905)) are among the best examples of Colter's work, and were influential in the development of an aesthetic for architecture to be used in America's National Park System. As a set, they were declared a National Historic Landmark in 1987.

== Description and significance ==
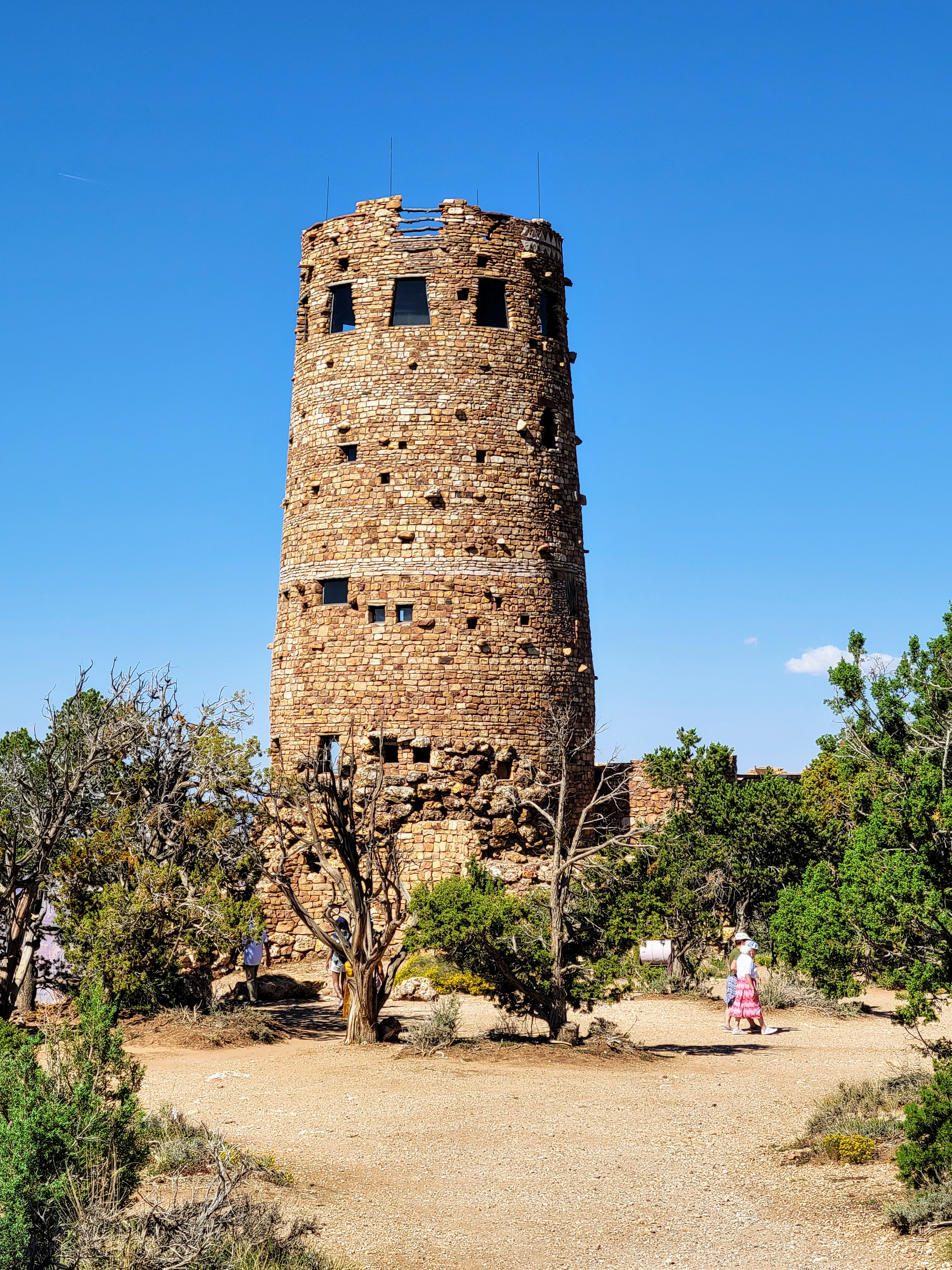
Desert View Watchtower, 2020

Hopi House and the Lookout Studio are located in the Grand Canyon Village, a National Historic Landmark district comprising the core of the densest development in the park. Hermit's Rest is located at the end of the paved road a few miles to the west of Grand Canyon Village. The Desert View Watchtower is the center of the Desert View visitor services area, about 12 miles (19 km) to the east of Grand Canyon Village, and is itself encompassed by the Desert View Watchtower Historic District. All four buildings were originally built by the Atchison, Topeka & Santa Fe Railroad, and were managed by the railroad's concessionaire, the Fred Harvey Company.

Mary Colter's designs were influenced in part by the many ancient ruins of the American Southwest, as exemplified in Hopi House and the Desert View Watchtower, both of which resulted from her study of existing structures and ruins. Hopi House is a modern take on a dwelling of the Hopi people, while the tower borrows architecturally from a variety of ruins. The tower's interior also includes reproductions of rock art from a site that has since been destroyed. The Hermit's Rest and Lookout Studio, in contrast, were designed to fit organically into their surrounding landscape, a technique which would be adopted by other architects working on projects for the National Park Service.

== See also ==
- List of National Historic Landmarks in Arizona
