= Mary Colter =

American architect (1869–1958)

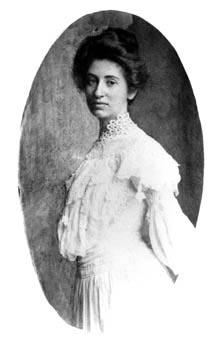
- Born: Mary Elizabeth Jane Colter; April 4, 1869; Pittsburgh, Pennsylvania, U.S.
- Died: January 8, 1958 (aged 88); Santa Fe, New Mexico, U.S.
- Education: California School of Design
- Occupation: Architect
- Parent(s): William Colter, Rebecca Crozier Colter
- Buildings: Hopi House, The Lookout, Hermit's Rest, Phantom Ranch, the Desert View Watchtower, Bright Angel Lodge, El Navajo, and the La Fonda

Mary Elizabeth Jane Colter (April 4, 1869 – January 8, 1958) was an American architect and designer. She was one of the very few female American architects in her day. She was the designer of many landmark buildings and spaces for the Fred Harvey Company and the Santa Fe Railroad, notably in Grand Canyon National Park. Her work had enormous influence as she helped to create a style, blending Spanish Colonial Revival and Mission Revival architecture with Native American motifs and Rustic elements, that became popular throughout the Southwest. Colter was a perfectionist, who spent a lifetime advocating and defending her aesthetic vision in a largely male-dominated field.

== Early life and education ==
Mary Colter was born in Pittsburgh, Pennsylvania to Irish immigrants William and Rebecca Crozier Colter. Her family moved to Colorado and Texas before settling down in St. Paul, Minnesota, the town she considered to be her home, when Mary was eleven.

In 1880, the town of St. Paul was boasting a population of 40,000 people and a large minority population of Sioux Indians. As a child, a family friend, John Graham, presented the Colter family with Sioux drawings, made by prisoners at Fort Keogh. This is the point where her fascination with the Native American cultures began. When the Indian community was ravaged by a smallpox outbreak, Colter's mother tried to burn all of the Native American things they had for fear that it would get her family sick. Mary, however, hid those drawings from her mother and so prevented them from being burned. Mary also kept these same Sioux drawings for much of her life, bequeathing them to the Custer Battlefield National Monument in 1956.

Colter graduated high school in 1883 at the age of 14. After her father died in 1886, Colter attended the California School of Design (now the San Francisco Art Institute) until 1890, where she studied art and design. She promised that, when she graduated, she would return to St. Paul to financially support her mother and older sister, who was chronically ill. While in San Francisco, she apprenticed in an architect's office to gain experience and support herself. She was taught by teachers including Arthur Frank Mathews, who painted the earliest known portrait of Colter.

After teaching at the Stout Manual Training School in Menomonie, Wisconsin for a year, Colter moved back to St. Paul and taught art, drafting, and architecture for some years. Colter taught at the Mechanic Arts High School for fifteen years and lectured at the University Extension School. At this time, she was involved in the Arts and Crafts movement. She was also a clubwoman, and gave several lectures and classes related to art.

== Career ==
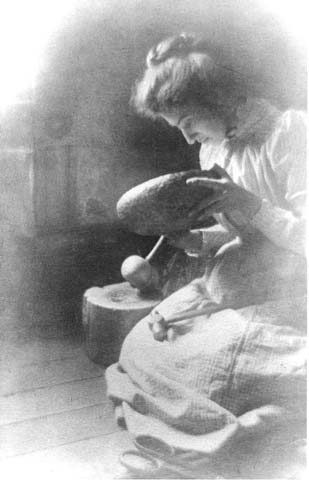
23-year old Mary Colter making a metal bowl.

By one account, in 1902, Minnie Harvey Huckel helped Colter obtain a summer job with her family's Fred Harvey Company (operator of the famous railstop Harvey House restaurants), decorating the Indian Building at the Alvarado Hotel in Albuquerque (since demolished). The Indian Buildings, one of Minnie's ideas executed by her husband, were meant to entertain passengers as trains made stops to replenish water and fuel. Colter was given the challenge of arranging salesrooms so tourists could imagine displaying goods in their homes. She also worked with Charles Whittlesey on the El Tovar Hotel and began designing a curio shop. Upon returning to St. Paul to teach in the fall, Colter continued her work on the curio shop, which became the Hopi House.

For the next seven years, Colter continued working for Harvey from St. Paul. She continued teaching and her involvement in art and clubs in the city. In 1908, Colter moved with her mother and sister to Seattle to take a position developing the Decoration Department for the Frederick and Nelson department store in Seattle. Colter left the position in 1909, when her mother became ill and died. The Colter sisters returned to St. Paul to bury their mother in the family plot.

Colter began working full-time for the company in 1910, moving from interior designer to architect in a position based in Kansas City. For the next 38 years, Colter served as chief architect and decorator for the Fred Harvey Company. As one of the country's few female architects – and arguably the most outstanding – Colter worked in often rugged conditions to complete 21 landmark hotels, commercial lodges, and public spaces for the Fred Harvey Company, by then being run by the founder's sons.

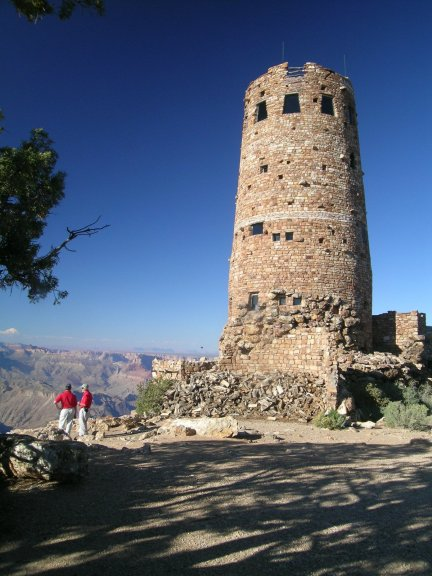
Desert View Watchtower (1932) Grand Canyon National Park South Rim

Fred Harvey developed the West along the Santa Fe's main route through strategic use of restaurant efficiency, clean-cut young women, high-end tourism, and souvenirs. Anthropologists on his staff located appealing Native American art and artifacts like pottery, jewelry, and leatherwork. His merchandisers designed goods based on those artifacts. And in strategic locations, Colter produced commercial architecture, based on some concern for authenticity, floorplans calculated for user experience and commercial function, and a playful sense of the dramatic inside and out.

The Santa Fe railroad bought the La Fonda hotel on the plaza of the old city of Santa Fe, New Mexico, in 1925 and leased it to the Harvey Company to operate. For a major expansion, Colter was assigned to do the interior design and decorating. She hired artists and artisans from the nearby pueblos to make the furniture. Native American styles were employed in hand-crafted chandeliers, copper and tin lighting fixtures, tiles and textiles, and other ornamentation. La Fonda became the most successful of the Harvey House hotels. Its striking blend of Pueblo people and Spanish artistic influences, today known locally as the Santa Fe Style, became very popular across the region.

=== Grand Canyon buildings ===
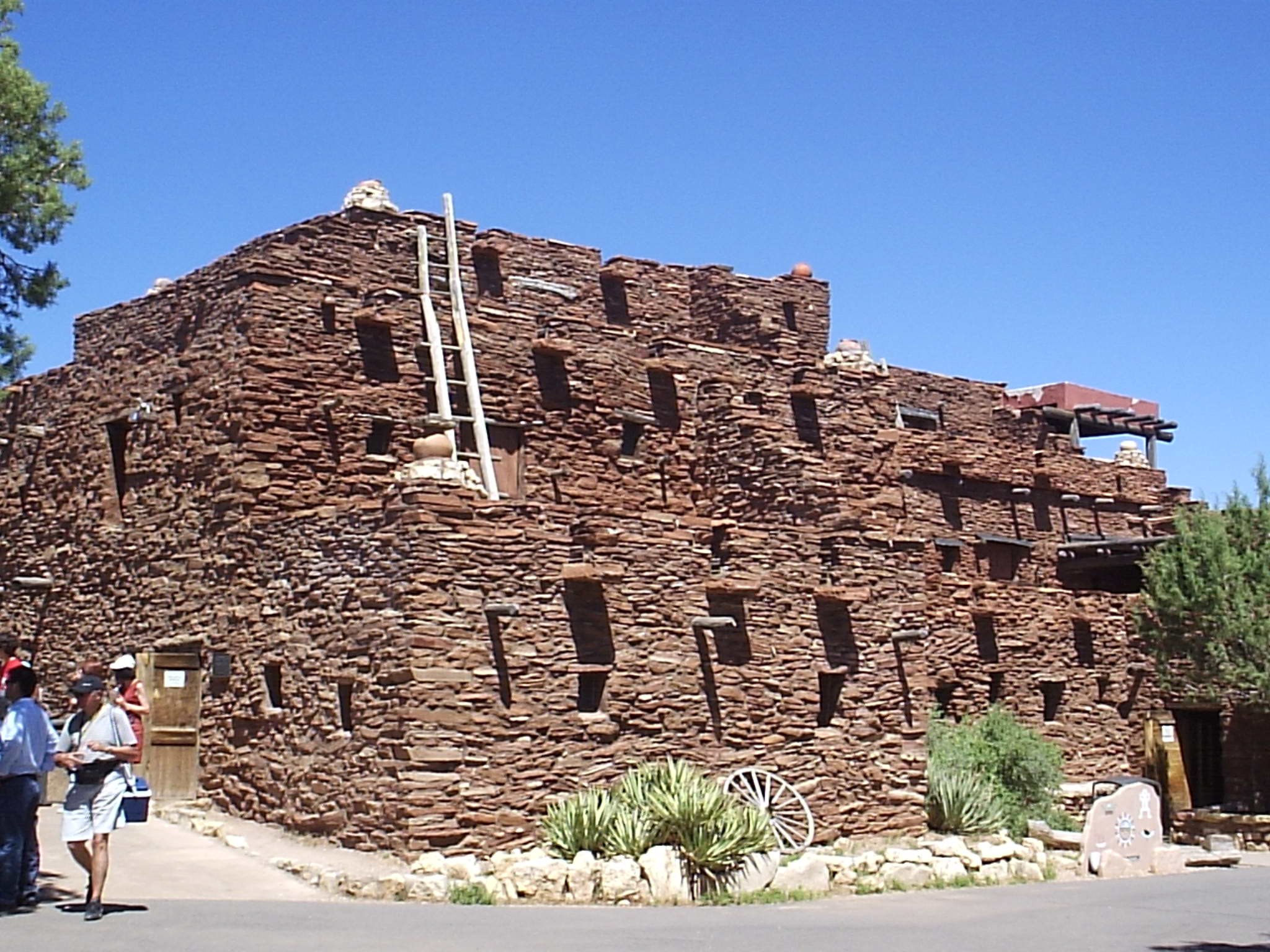
Hopi House (1905)

Colter created a series of remarkable works in the Grand Canyon National Park, mostly on the South Rim: the 1905 Hopi House, the 1914 Hermit's Rest and observatory Lookout Studio, and the 1932 Desert View Watchtower, a 70-foot-tall (21 m) rock tower with a hidden steel structure, as well as the 1935 Bright Angel Lodge complex, and the 1922 Phantom Ranch buildings at the bottom of the canyon. Colter also decorated, but did not design, the park's El Tovar Hotel. In 1987, the Mary Jane Colter Buildings, as a group, were listed as a National Historic Landmark. (She also designed the 1936 Victor Hall for men, and the 1937 Colter Hall, a dormitory for Fred Harvey's women employees.)

Colter worked with Pueblo Revival architecture, Spanish Colonial Revival architecture, Mission Revival architecture, Streamline Moderne, American Craftsman, and Arts and Crafts Movement styles, often synthesizing several together evocatively. Colter's work is credited with inspiring the Pueblo Deco style.

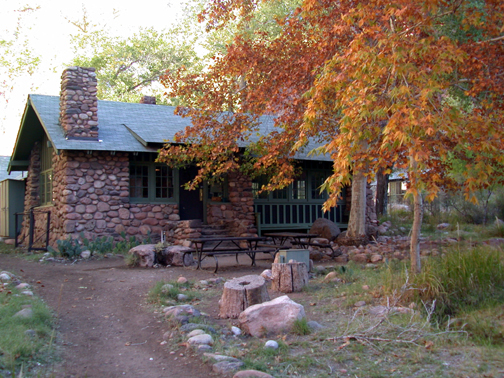
The trend-setting Phantom Ranch Canteen, built at the bottom of the Grand Canyon

The Harvey Company got the concession in 1922 to operate a camp at the bottom of the Grand Canyon. Considering the Phantom Ranch's location, Colter's use of on-site fieldstone and rough-hewn wood was deemed the only practical thing for the permanent buildings that replaced tents. In the following years this innovative work became a de facto model for subsequent National Park Service and Civilian Conservation Corps structures, influencing the look and feel of an entire genre of parkitecture, often called National Park Service Rustic. Her structures at the Grand Canyon set the precedent for using on-site materials and bold, large-scale design elements.

For her Bright Angel Lodge on the South Rim, she used a 6-foot (1.8 m) scale model to ensure that the lodge and cabins fit into the landscape. The lodge features a remarkable "geological fireplace" in the History Room, with rocks arranged ceiling to floor in the same order as the geologic strata along the Bright Angel Trail down the canyon wall.

A chain-smoking perfectionist, Colter cared about backstory and attractive features. She conceived Hermit's Rest as a sort of folly, as if it had been wired together by a reclusive mountain man. The Hopi House was a market for Native American crafts, made by Hopi artisans on the site, and designed in sandstone to resemble a Hopi pueblo. (Unfortunately, a recent cleaning eliminated the artificial age-effects.) The Watchtower was the product of travel and research, and she cared enough to herself prepare a Manual for Drivers and Guides Descriptive of the Indian Watchtower at Desert View and its Relation, Architecturally, to the Prehistoric Ruins of the Southwest. The original paintings inside the tower were by Hopi artist Fred Kabotie. She also insisted on her proposed name "Phantom Ranch" (over "Roosevelt Ranch") to capitalize on better mental images.

=== Other works ===
Colter's pioneering masterwork may have been the 1923 El Navajo in Gallup, New Mexico, remarkable for its forward-looking fusion of a Native American-inspired design on the severe Art Deco building by Santa Fe Railway architect A. E. Harrison. Her breakthrough creation incorporated Navajo sand paintings and rugs with hand-carved and hand-painted furniture. The original plans sketched about 100 bedrooms and 15 shared baths, making the structure physically obsolete before it was razed to make way for widening Route 77 in 1957, shortly before Colter's death. (She saw demolitions of a few other projects before she died, causing her to despair, "It's possible to live too long.")

Mary Colter herself declared the 1930 La Posada Hotel to be her masterpiece. The sprawling, hacienda-style Spanish Colonial Revival building in Winslow, Arizona, has been called "the last great railroad hotel built in America". She was architect and designer for the entire resort, from the buildings to the acres of gardens, the furniture, china – even the maids' uniforms. Closed in 1957, in a long decline it was first a drab 1960s office building for the Santa Fe, and then was empty when the National Trust for Historic Preservation placed the hotel on its annual "Most Endangered" list.

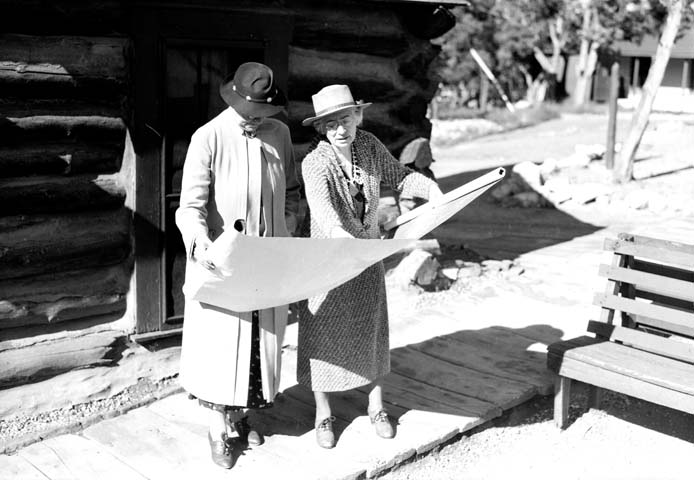
Mary Colter looking at blueprints with Mrs. Ickes, c. 1935

Allen Affeldt heard about the endangered masterpiece, and in 1996 he and his wife Tina Mion, an artist, purchased it, and soon reopened parts of the hotel for business. However, the hotel was without many of the design elements, which had been auctioned off. Today, a museum of Mion's paintings is on the second floor; works by Dan Lutzick line the sculpture court; a museum of Route 66 is going into the former depot. The compound and gardens, being restored to the original and intended grandeur, are the core elements of the La Posada Historic District on the National Register.

Ashtray designed by Mary Colter inspired by Native American motifs

Late in her career, Colter designed Harvey House restaurant at the 1939 Los Angeles Union Station. Under an arched ceiling, the floor appears to be made of random zigzags and geometrics; from another angle the pattern reveals a block-long Navajo blanket made of linoleum tiles. The dining room and the Streamline Moderne cocktail lounge were padlocked except for occasional movie shoots and Los Angeles Conservancy tours until 2018. On 4 October 2018, the restaurant was reopened as Imperial Western Beer Company.

Not long before her retirement, Colter took on the 1947 renovation of the Painted Desert Inn in Arizona's Petrified Forest National Park. During the Depression, a 1922 inn had been overhauled by Civilian Conservation Corps workers to the Mission Revival style, using local materials and Native American motifs. Then Colter supervised the refreshening, provided a new color scheme, and commissioned Hopi artist Fred Kabotie to put murals in the dining areas. Showing that she was unafraid of the modern when the situation called for it, Colter installed plate glass windows to open up views of the splendid scenery. Closed in 1963, the inn survived a threatened demolition, and was placed on the National Register of Historic Places in 1987. It reopened in 2006, restored to the way it looked circa 1949 after Colter's redesign.

Colter was the creator of Mimbreño china and flatware for the glamorous Super Chief Chicago–Los Angeles rail service, begun in 1936 by the Santa Fe Railroad. Colter, herself by then an Indian art expert, based her designs on 1100 CE Mimbres patterns excavated by her friends Harriet and Cornelius Cosgrove at the Swarts Ruin in New Mexico from 1924 to 1927. Mimbreño china was produced by the Onondaga Pottery Co. of Syracuse, New York under its better-known trade name, Syracuse China, until 1970. The luxury Super Chief and business class dining services were discontinued after the train was turned over to Amtrak in May 1971 (today the Southwest Chief covers the route). Later that year Mimbreño plates and pieces became available to ordinary individuals for the first time, disposed of in two large public offerings. Mimbreño railroad china remains avidly and competitively collected, with single plates selling for many hundreds of dollars. A line of authorized reproductions has been sold since 1989.

== Legacy ==
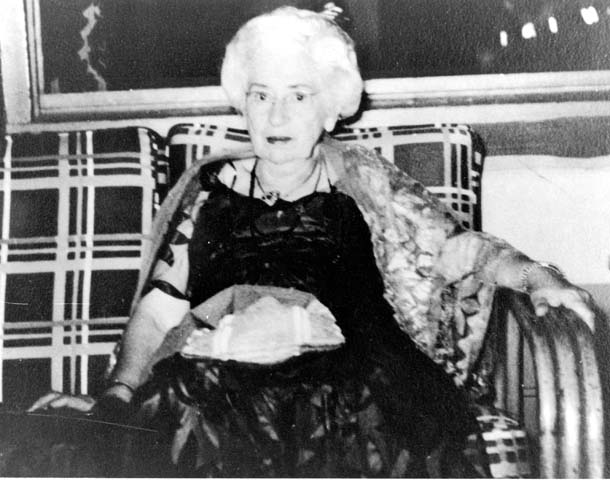
Mary Colter, age 80

Colter retired to Santa Fe, New Mexico, in 1948. She donated her collection of Native American pottery and Indian relics to Mesa Verde National Park. She had to watch as many of her famous works were destroyed during her lifetime as automobile travel replaced train travel.

Colter died on January 8, 1958, she is buried in Oakland Cemetery in Saint Paul, Minnesota.

Four of her Grand Canyon National Park buildings are protected within the Mary Jane Colter National Historic Landmark District.

== Awards and honors ==
- 1986: Arizona Women's Hall of Fame
- 2009: National Cowgirl Museum and Hall of Fame

== Design projects ==
=== Architectural ===
- Hopi House, Grand Canyon Village, 1905
- Hermit's Rest, Grand Canyon Village, 1914
- Lookout Studio, Grand Canyon Village, 1914
- Phantom Ranch, Grand Canyon Village, 1922
- El Navajo, Gallup, New Mexico, 1923
- La Posada Hotel, Winslow, Arizona, 1930
- Desert View Watchtower, Grand Canyon Village, 1932
- Bright Angel Lodge, Grand Canyon Village, 1935
- Painted Desert Inn, Petrified Forest National Park, Arizona, 1947

=== Interior design ===
- Indian Building at the Alvarado Hotel, Albuquerque, New Mexico, c. 1902 (Demolished)
- El Tovar Hotel, Grand Canyon Village
- El Ortiz, Lamy, New Mexico (Demolished)
- La Fonda, Santa Fe, New Mexico, 1925,
- Harvey House Restaurant, Union Station, Los Angeles, 1939

=== Industrial design ===
- Mimbreño China, Santa Fe Railroad Super Chief, 1936

== See also ==
- Mary Colter buildings
- Women in architecture
- List of California women architects
