= Bright Angel Lodge =

- U.S. National Register of Historic Places
- U.S. Historic district – Contributing property
- U.S. National Historic Landmark District – Contributing property
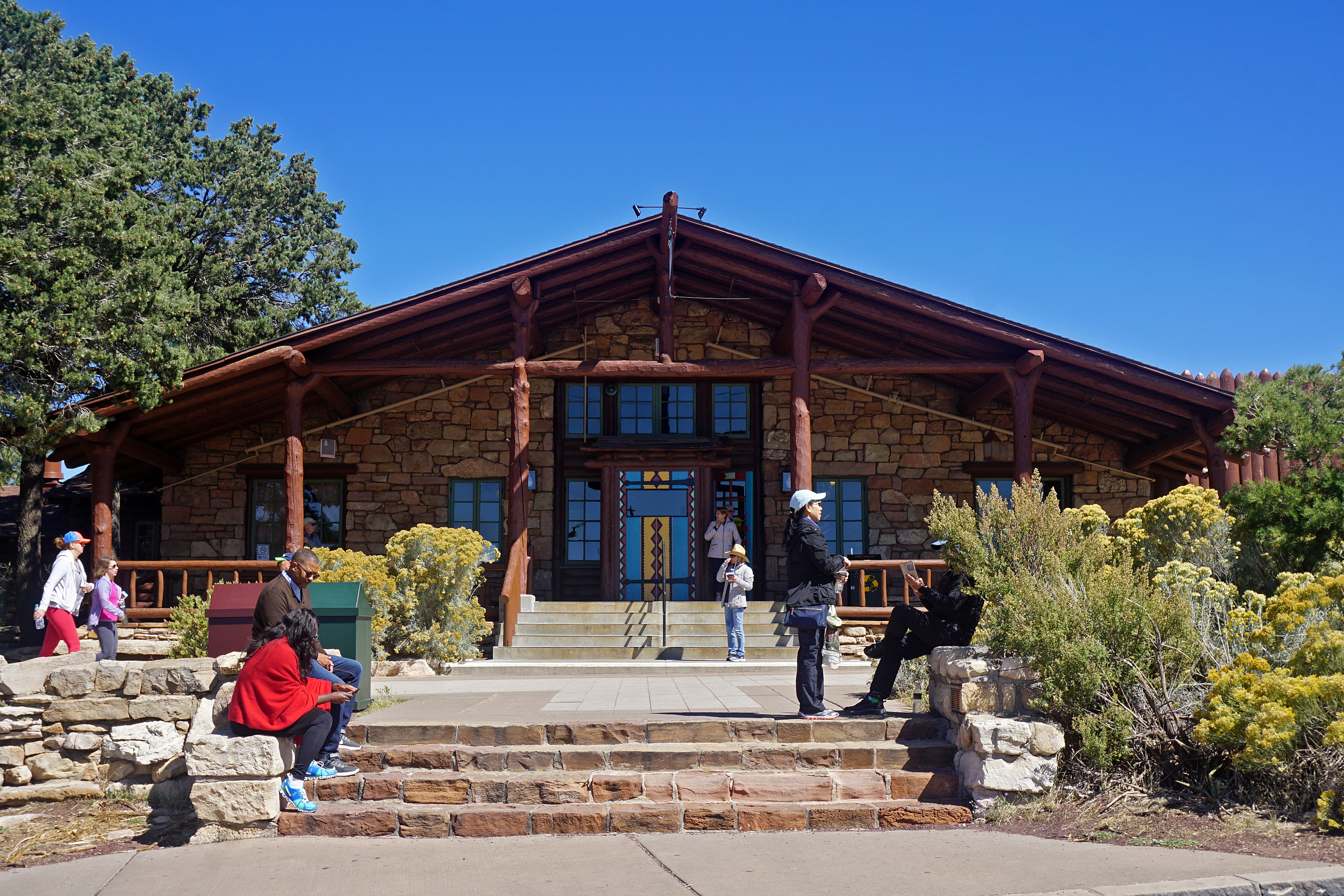
- Main lodge building

- Location within Arizona
- Location: Grand Canyon Village, Arizona
- Coordinates: 36°03′26″N 112°08′28″W
- Built: 1935
- Architect: Mary Colter et al
- Architectural style: Rustic
- Part of: Grand Canyon Village Historic District
- NRHP reference No.: 75000343 Added to NRHP November 20, 1975 Boundary increase October 24, 1995

Significant dates
- Added to NRHP: 1982
- Designated NHLDCP: February 18, 1987

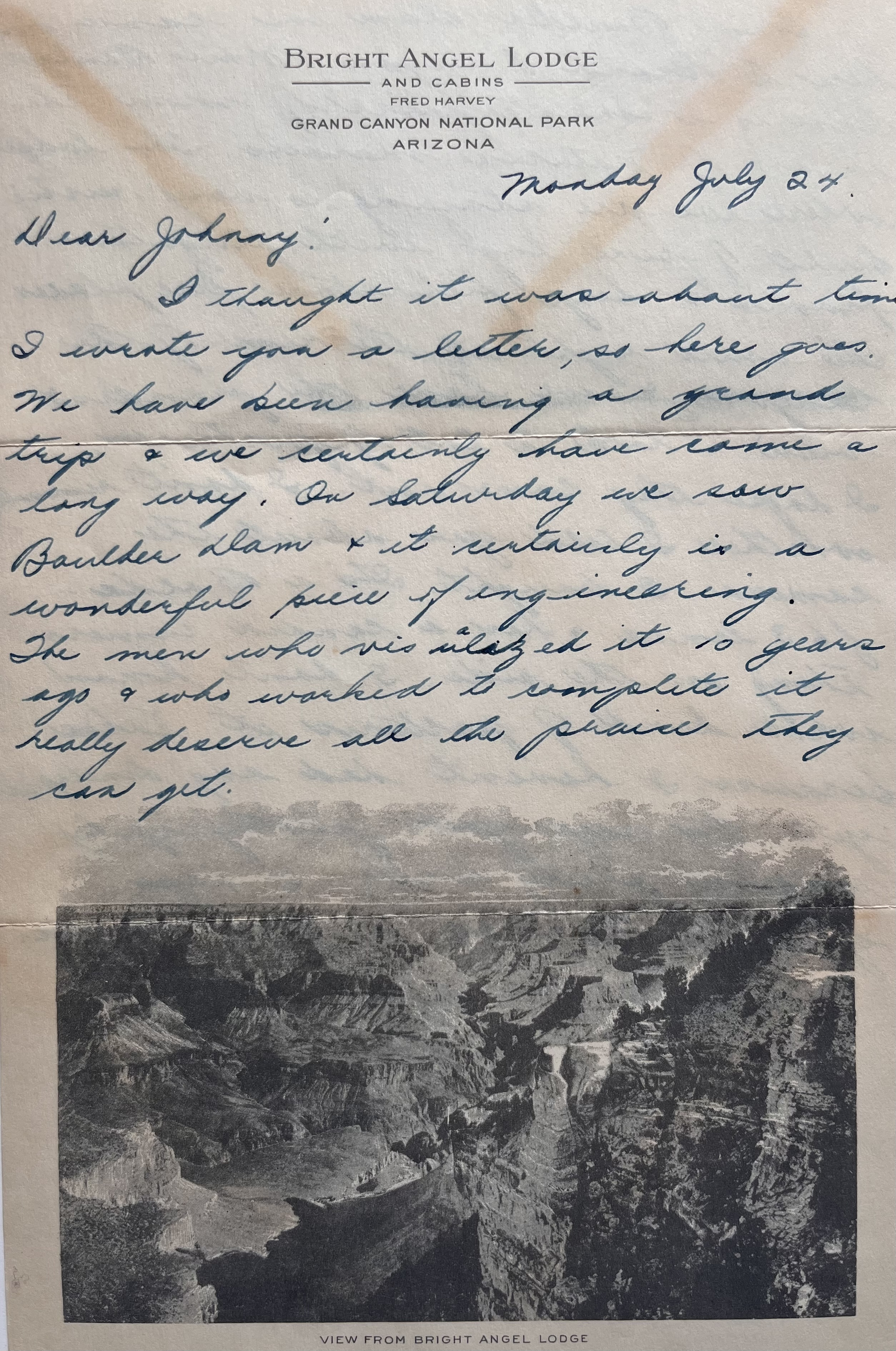
Bright Angel Lodge letterhead example (1939).

Bright Angel Lodge is a hotel complex at the South Rim of the Grand Canyon in Grand Canyon National Park, Arizona. Designed by architect Mary Jane Colter, the lodge is a complex of cabins around a central lodge building, directly on the edge of the canyon. The rustic lodge complex is a major contributing building in the Grand Canyon Village National Historic Landmark District. In 2022, Bright Angel Lodge is also a member of Historic Hotels of America, an official program of the National Trust for Historic Preservation.

== History ==
The first accommodation at the location was established by James Thurber in 1896 at the head of the Bright Angel Trail leading into the canyon. Thurber ran a stagecoach line from the Grandview area to this new location to the west in 1896, building a small wood-frame hotel. At about the same time, Buckey O'Neill built his cabin nearby, calling it O'Neill's Camp. Thurber acquired the O'Neill cabin at about the time O'Neill died in Cuba during the Spanish–American War. Thurber expanded the operation, establishing a tent camp for tourists and calling the complex the Bright Angel Hotel and the Bright Angel Camps.

Thurber sold the Bright Angel operation to Williams, Arizona hotelier Martin Buggeln, in time for the Grand Canyon Railroad to be completed to the South Rim in September. The railroad, which claimed most of the lands at the South Rim, including the Bright Angel site, cooperated with Buggeln while the railroad's El Tovar Hotel was being built immediately to the east of the Bright Angel Hotel, then bought out Buggeln when the new hotel was completed in 1905. The railroad renovated the older hotel and built cabins to replace the tents. In contrast to the lodgings at the El Tovar, which were marketed as a destination hotel, the Bright Angel facilities were aimed at a middle-class market.

The Red Horse Station was originally built as a stage coach stop about 16 miles (26 km) south of the South Rim. When the railroad was extended to the South Rim, Ralph Cameron disassembled the post and moved it to the South rim and rebuilt it just to the west of the Buckey O'Neill Cabin in 1902, adding a wood frame second floor to the log first floor and calling it Cameron's Hotel. From 1907 it housed the park's post office.

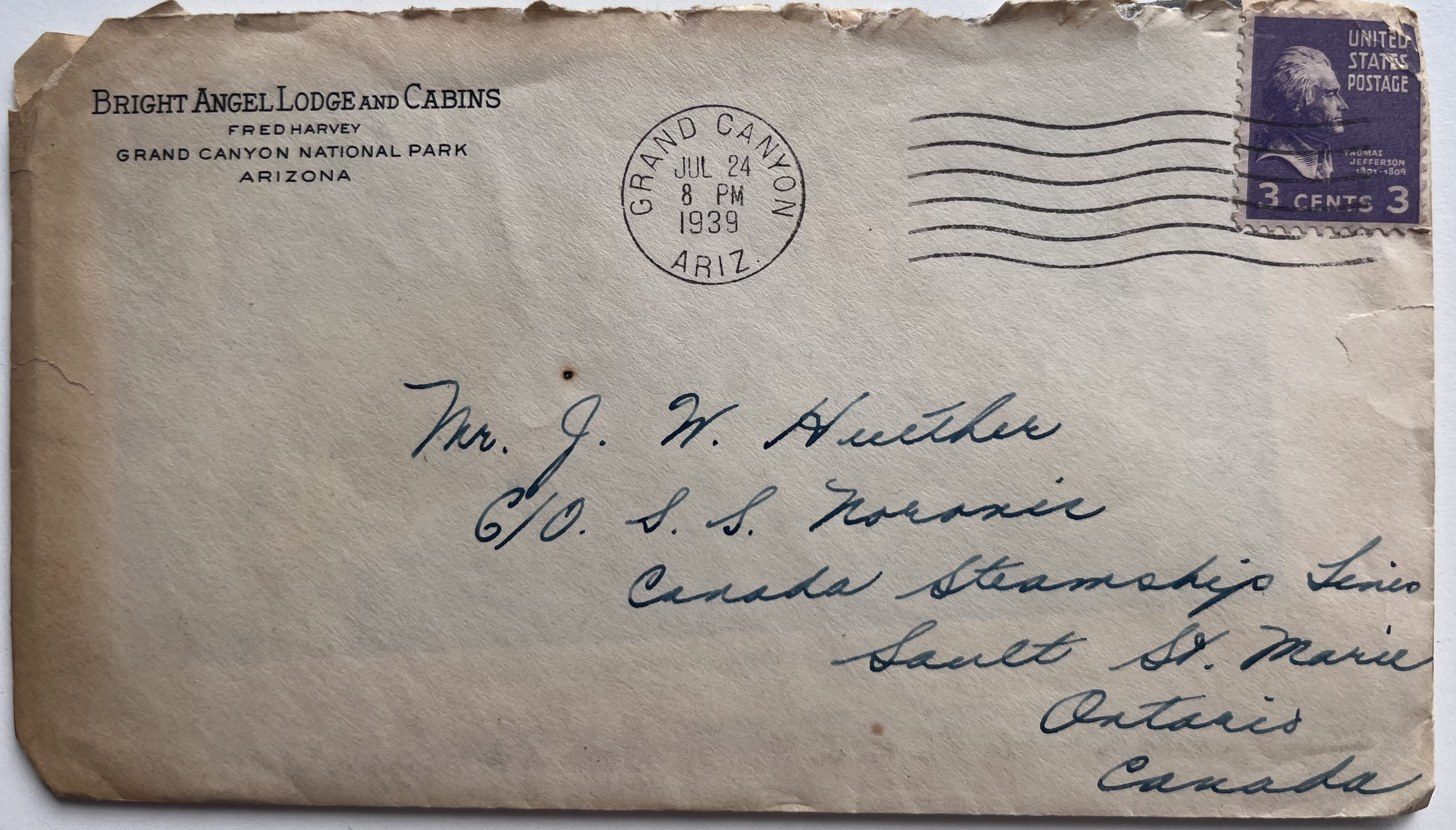
Correspondence envelope from Bright Angel Lodge (1939).

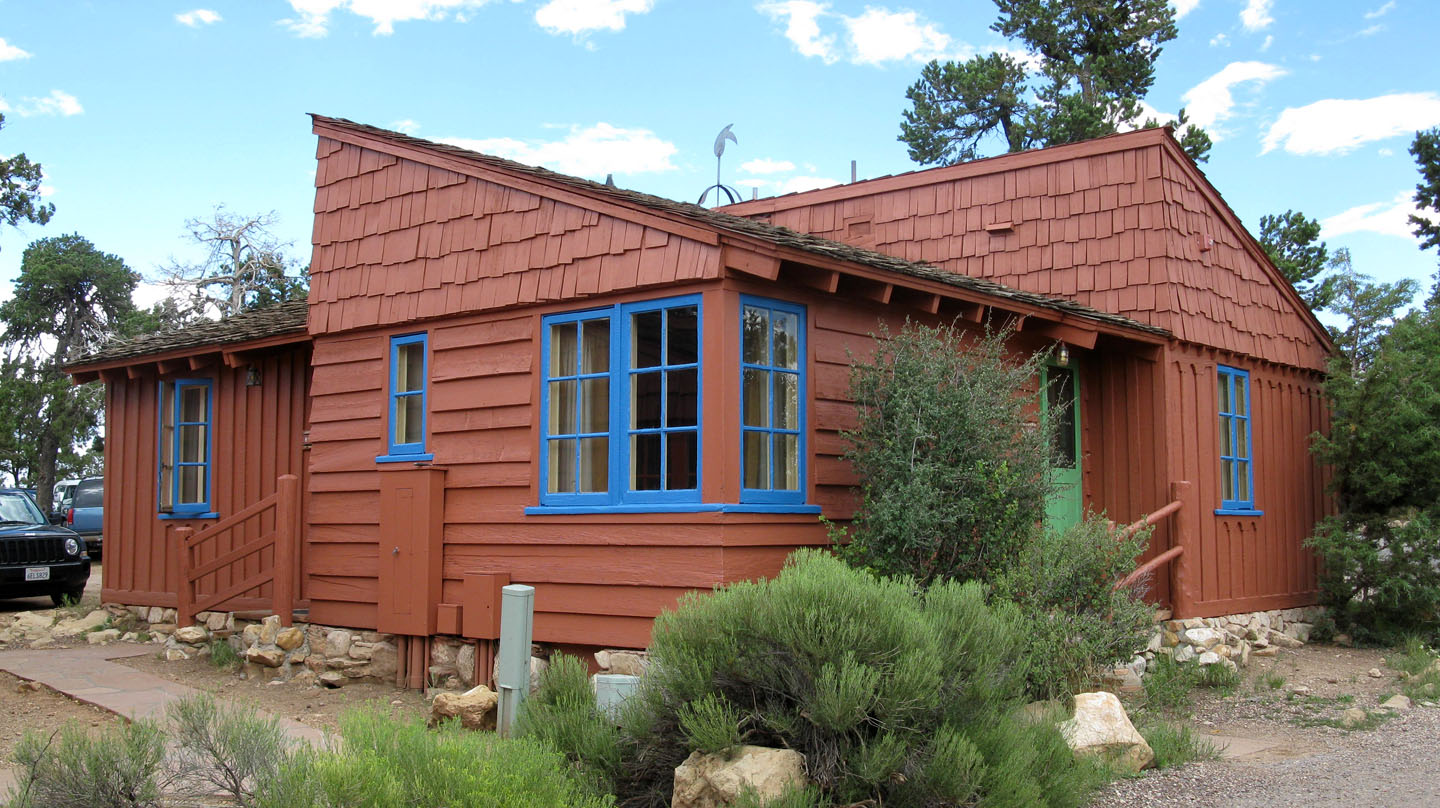
Bright Angel cabin

By the 1930s the Bright Angel operation needed renovation. The Atchison, Topeka and Santa Fe Railway, which owned the Grand Canyon Railroad and the South Rim concessions, asked architect Mary Colter to design a replacement. Colter's initial designs resembled her Hermit's Rest and Lookout Studio structures, both located nearby. The Park Service did not approve of such extensive use of stone for the new lodgings, and Colter revised the design to wood-frame construction, Colter kept the O'Neill Cabin and the Red Horse Cabin (removing its incongruous second floor) and replaced the tent cabins with new rustic cabins of log and local stone construction, completed in 1935. Colter took particular pains to integrate the new complex into the landscape, using a scale model to study the design.

== Description ==
The lodge is a large structure with a simple shallow-pitched gable roof. The roof overhangs at the main entry to form a gabled porch supported by peeled log posts. Colter used shed-roofed appendages to create a layered effect for the mass of the main lodge. Interior finishes included hand-adzed logs, adobe and local limestone. The stone fireplace materials reproduce the strata found in the Grand Canyon along the Bright Angel Trail in their correct sequence from bottom to top. The semi-detached cabins are laid out in the space between the lodge and the canyon's rim, with some directly overlooking the canyon. Cabins were furnished with antiques and reproductions hand-picked by Colter. The lodge's cocktail lounge features murals by Hopi artist Fred Kabotie.

== Historic designation ==
The Bright Angel Lodge and cabins are significant contributing structures in the Grand Canyon Village National Historic Landmark District. The historic district, created in 1975 without Bright Angel Lodge being included, was expanded in 1982 to include the Bright Angel Lodge and its cabins, according to the 1996-dated National Historic Landmark Nomination document. It had initially been left out of the nomination as it had not yet reached the 50-year age threshold, but the 1982 nomination made plain that the Bright Angel complex had such exceptional significance that it was worthy of waiving the 50-year requirement.
