= Grand Canyon National Park =

National park in Arizona, United States

- IUCN category II (national park)
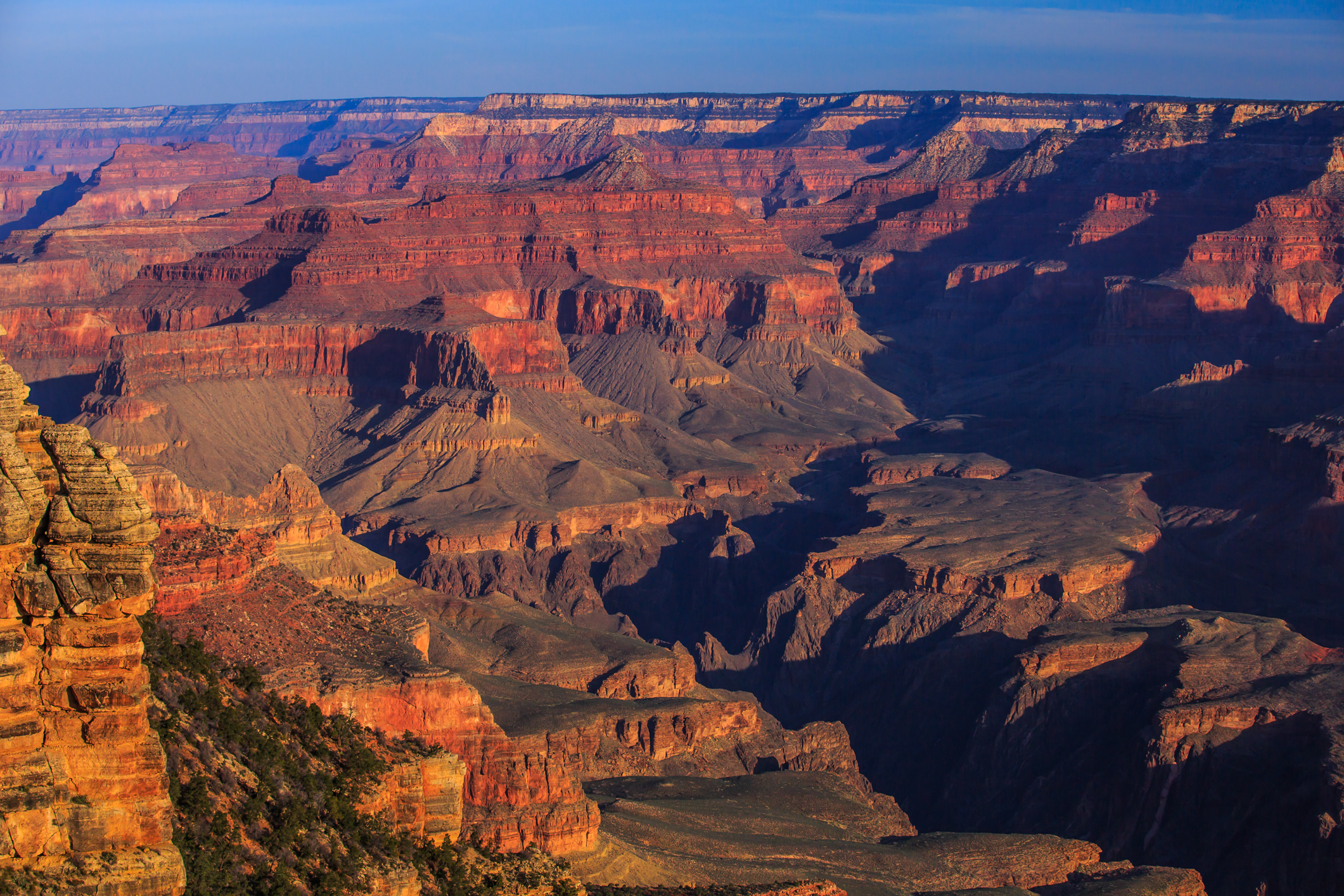
- Grand Canyon from the South Rim at dawn
- Interactive map of Grand Canyon National Park
- Location: Coconino and Mohave counties, Arizona, United States
- Nearest city: Fredonia, Arizona (North Rim); Tusayan, Arizona (South Rim)
- Coordinates: 36°03′19″N 112°07′19″W
- Area: 1,217,262 acres (4,926.08 km^{2})
- Established: January 11, 1908; 118 years ago as a national monument February 26, 1919; 107 years ago as a national park
- Visitors: 4,430,653 (in 2025)
- Governing body: National Park Service
- Website: nps.gov/grca

UNESCO World Heritage Site
- Criteria: Natural: vii, viii, ix, x
- Reference: 75
- Inscription: 1979 (3rd Session)

Grand Canyon National Park is a national park of the United States located in northwestern Arizona, the 15th site to have been named as a national park. The park's central feature is the Grand Canyon, a gorge of the Colorado River, which is often considered one of the Wonders of the World. The park, which covers 1,217,262 acres (1,901.972 sq mi; 4,926.08 km^{2}) of unincorporated area in Coconino and Mohave counties, received more than 4.9 million recreational visitors in 2024. The Grand Canyon was designated a World Heritage Site by UNESCO in 1979. The park celebrated its 100th anniversary on February 26, 2019.

== History ==
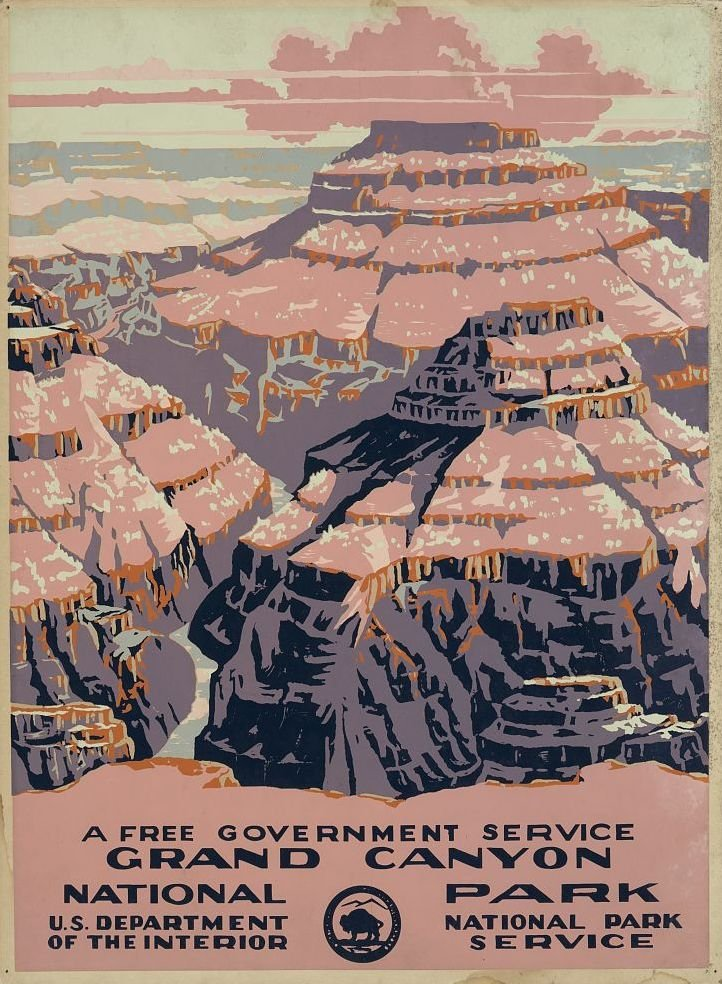
1938 poster of the park

The Grand Canyon became well known to Americans in the 1880s after railroads were built and pioneers developed infrastructure and early tourism. In 1903, President Theodore Roosevelt visited the site and said,

The Grand Canyon fills me with awe. It is beyond comparison—beyond description; absolutely unparalleled throughout the wide world .... Let this great wonder of nature remain as it now is. Do nothing to mar its grandeur, sublimity and loveliness. You cannot improve on it. But you can keep it for your children, your children's children, and all who come after you, as the one great sight which every American should see.

Despite Roosevelt's enthusiasm and strong interest in preserving land for public use, the Grand Canyon was not immediately designated as a national park. The first bill to establish Grand Canyon National Park was introduced in 1882 by then-Senator Benjamin Harrison, which would have established Grand Canyon as the third national park in the United States, after Yellowstone and Mackinac. Harrison unsuccessfully reintroduced his bill in 1883 and 1886; after his election to the presidency, he established the Grand Canyon Forest Reserve in 1893. Theodore Roosevelt created the Grand Canyon Game Preserve by proclamation on November 28, 1906, and the Grand Canyon National Monument on January 11, 1908. Further Senate bills to establish the site as a national park were introduced and defeated in 1910 and 1911, before the Grand Canyon National Park Act (Pub. L. 65–277) was finally signed by President Woodrow Wilson on February 26, 1919. The National Park Service, established in 1916, assumed administration of the park.

The creation of the park was an early success of the conservation movement. Its national park status may have helped thwart proposals to dam the Colorado River within its boundaries. (Later, the Glen Canyon Dam would be built upriver.) A second Grand Canyon National Monument to the west was proclaimed in 1932. In 1975, that monument and Marble Canyon National Monument, which was established in 1969 and followed the Colorado River northeast from the Grand Canyon to Lees Ferry, were made part of Grand Canyon National Park. In 1979, UNESCO declared the park a World Heritage Site. The 1987 the National Parks Overflights Act found that "Noise associated with aircraft overflights at the Grand Canyon National Park is causing a significant adverse effect on the natural quiet and experience of the park and current aircraft operations at the Grand Canyon National Park have raised serious concerns regarding public safety, including concerns regarding the safety of park users."

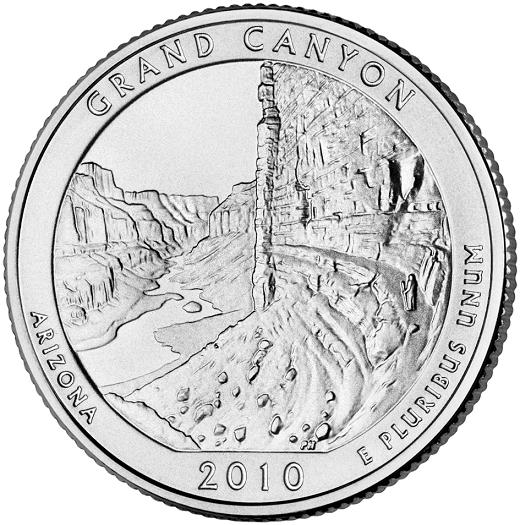
Grand Canyon quarter

In 2010, Grand Canyon National Park was honored with its own coin under the America the Beautiful Quarters program. On February 26, 2019, the Grand Canyon National Park commemorated 100 years since its designation as a national park.

The Grand Canyon had been part of the National Park Service's Intermountain Region until 2018. Today, the Grand Canyon is a part of Region 8, also known as the Lower Colorado Basin.

On July 9, 2025, the Dragon Bravo Fire led to multiple structures on the North Rim being destroyed, including the Grand Canyon Lodge. The fire burned for more than a week using confine and contained strategies before firefighters started more aggressively tackling the fire. The fire is concurrent with another fire, the White Sage Fire.

=== Legal history timeline ===
- 1882 First unsuccessful attempt to establish a Grand Canyon National Park
- 1893 Designated a "forest reserve" by President Benjamin Harrison (Presidential Proclamation #45)
- 1908 Established as Grand Canyon National Monument by President Theodore Roosevelt (Presidential Proclamation #794)
- 1919 Designation of Grand Canyon National Park by an act of Congress on February 26 (40 Stat 1175)
- 1975 Grand Canyon National Park Enlargement Act an act of Congress on January 3 (88 Stat 2089) (Pub. L. 93–620)
- 1979 Designation as a World Heritage Site on October 26

=== Administrators ===
- William Harrison Peters (acting): August 1919 – September 1920
- Dewitt L. Raeburn: October 1920 – December 1921
- John Roberts White (acting): December 1921 – February 1922
- Walter Wilson Crosby: February 1922 – January 1924
- George C. Bolton (acting): January 1923 – June 1923
- John Ross Eakin: January 1924 – April 1927
- Miner Raymond Tillotson: April 1927 – December 1938
- James V. Lloyd (acting): December 1938 – February 1939
- Harold Child Bryant (acting): February 1939 – January 1940
- James V. Lloyd (acting): January 1940 – August 1940
- Frank Alvah Kittredge: August 1940 – July 1941
- Harold Child Bryant: August 1941 – March 1954
- Preston P. Patraw: May 1954 – July 1955
- John Sherman McLaughlin: August 1955 – March 1964
- Howard B. Stricklin: March 1964 – February 1969
- Robert R. Lovegren: April 1969 – July 1972
- Merle E. Stitt: August 1972 – January 1980
- Bruce W. Shaw (acting): January 1980 – May 1980
- Richard W. Marks: May 1980 – December 1988
- John C. Reed (acting): December 1988 – January 1989
- John H. Davis: January 1989 – August 1991
- Robert Chandler: October 1991 – October 1993
- Boyd Evison (acting): January 1994 – July 1994
- Robert L. Arnberger: July 1994 – October 2000
- Dave Uberauga: 2011 – May 2016
- Christine Lehnertz: August 2016 – March 2019
- Ed Keable: April 2020 – present

== Geography ==
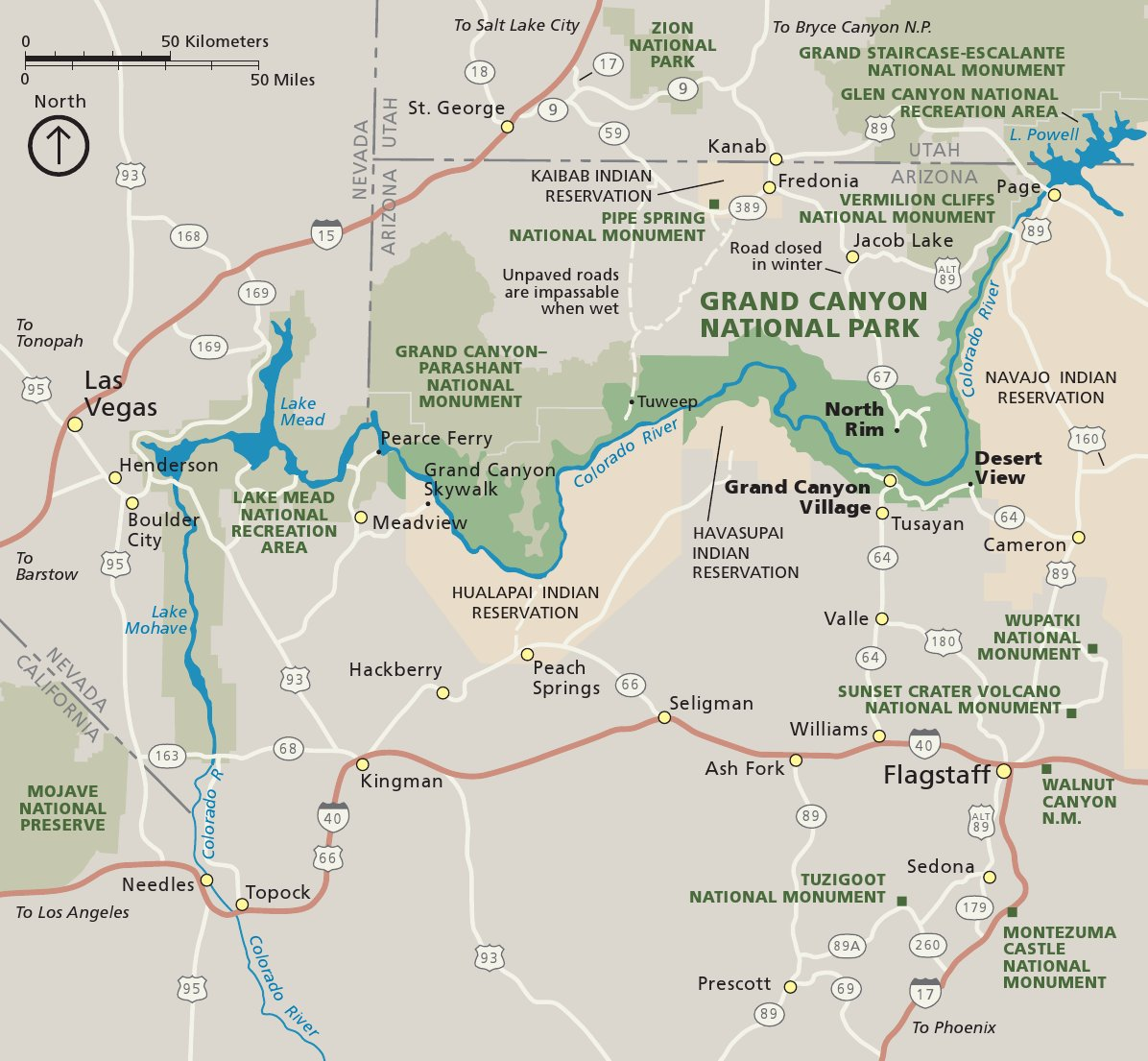
Grand Canyon regional map

The Grand Canyon, including its extensive system of tributary canyons, is valued for its combination of size, depth, and exposed layers of colorful rocks dating back to Precambrian times. The canyon itself was created by the incision of the Colorado River and its tributaries after the Colorado Plateau was uplifted, causing the Colorado River system to develop along its present path.

The primary public areas of the park are the South and North Rims, and adjacent areas of the canyon itself. The rest of the park is extremely rugged and remote, although many places are accessible by pack trail and backcountry roads. The South Rim is more accessible than the North Rim and accounts for 90% of park visitation.

The park headquarters are at Grand Canyon Village, not far from the South Entrance to the park, near one of the most popular viewpoints.

=== South Rim ===
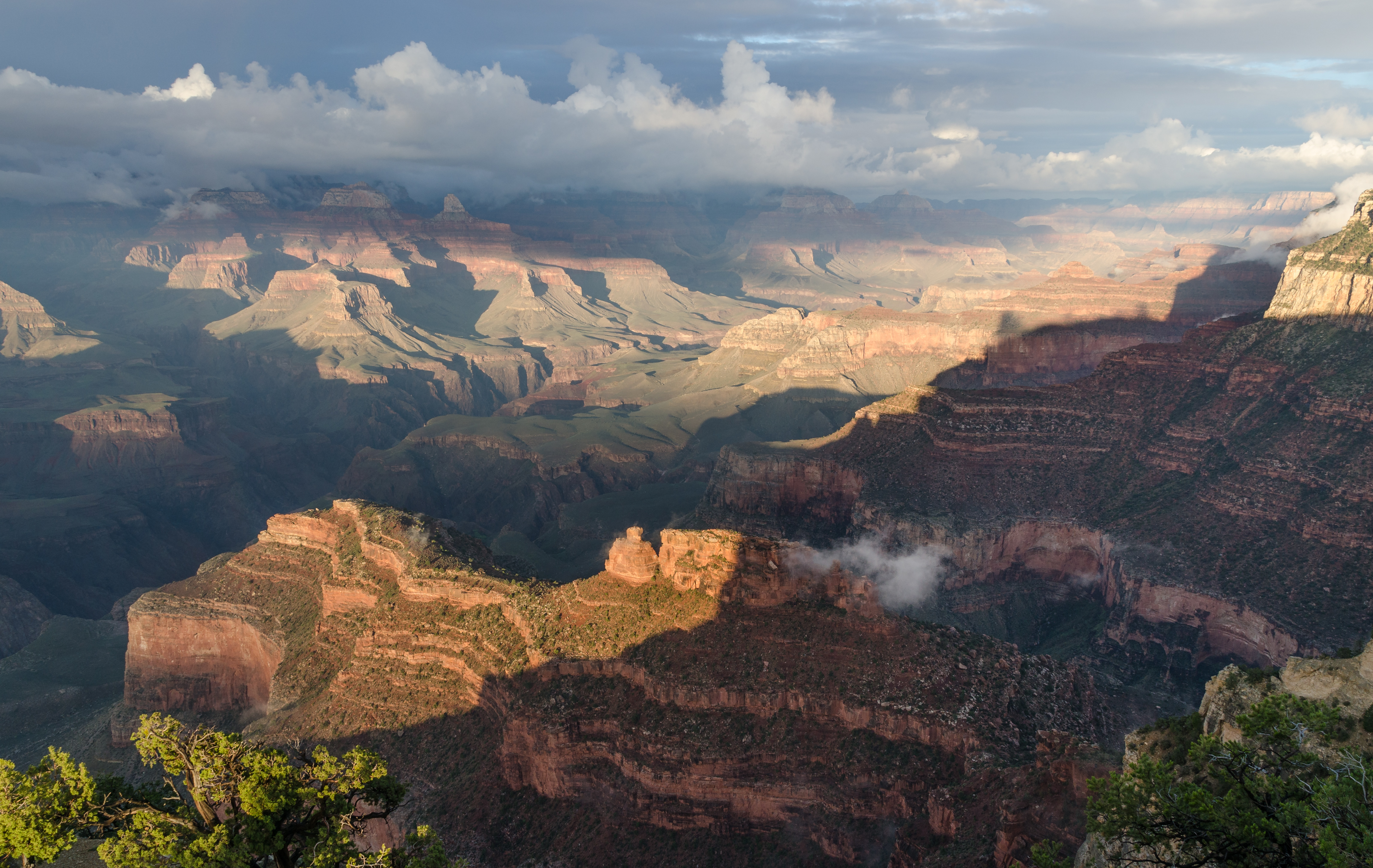
From Powell Point on the South Rim

Most visitors to the park come to the South Rim, arriving on Arizona State Route 64. The highway enters the park through the South Entrance, near Tusayan, Arizona, and heads eastward, leaving the park through the East Entrance. Interstate 40 provides access to the area from the south. From the north, U.S. Route 89 connects Utah, Colorado, and the North Rim to the South Rim. Overall, some 30 miles of the South Rim are accessible by road.

Grand Canyon Village is the primary visitor services area in the park. It is a full-service community, including lodging, fuel, food, souvenirs, a hospital, churches, and access to trails and guided walks and talks.

==== Lodging ====
Several lodging facilities are available along the South Rim. Hotels and other lodging include El Tovar, Bright Angel Lodge, Kachina Lodge, Thunderbird Lodge, and Maswik Lodge, all of which are located in Grand Canyon Village, and Phantom Ranch, located on the canyon floor. There is also an RV park named Trailer Village. All of these facilities are managed by Xanterra Parks & Resorts, while the Yavapai Lodge (also in the village area) is managed by Delaware North.

The El Tovar Hotel was built in 1905 as a luxury hotel for the Atchison, Topeka, and Santa Fe Railway, on the South Rim near the railway's main line. It was designed by Charles Whittlesley, a staff architect for the railway. The hotel is reminiscent of a Swiss chalet or Norwegian villa, combined with local materials for a rustic appearance sometimes called "National Park Service rustic". It consists of 4 stories, with a gift shop and restaurant located inside the hotel.

Bright Angel Lodge was built of logs and stone in 1935. Mary Colter designed the lodge and it was built by the Fred Harvey Company. Inside the lodge is a small museum honoring Fred Harvey (1835–1901), who played such as miner, judge, politician, author and tour guide. This cabin is the longest continually standing structure on the South Rim. It is currently used as a guest house; booking is required well in advance. brothers Ellsworth and Emery Kolb. They were photographers who made a living by photographing visitors walking down the Bright Angel Trail. In 1911, the Kolb brothers filmed their journey down the Green and Colorado Rivers. Emery Kolb showed this movie regularly in his studio until 1976 when he died at the age of 95. Today the building serves as an art gallery and exhibit.

- Hopi House was built by Mary Jane Colter in 1905. It is based on structures that were built in an ancient Hopi settlement called Old Oraibi, located on the Third Mesa in eastern Arizona. It served as a residence for the Hopi Indians who sold arts and crafts to South Rim visitors.
- Verkamp's Curios, which stands next to the Hopi House, was built by John Verkamp in 1905. He sold arts and crafts as well as souvenirs. Until September 2008, it was run by his descendants; in November 2008, the building reopened as a visitor center focusing on the history of the Grand Canyon Village community.

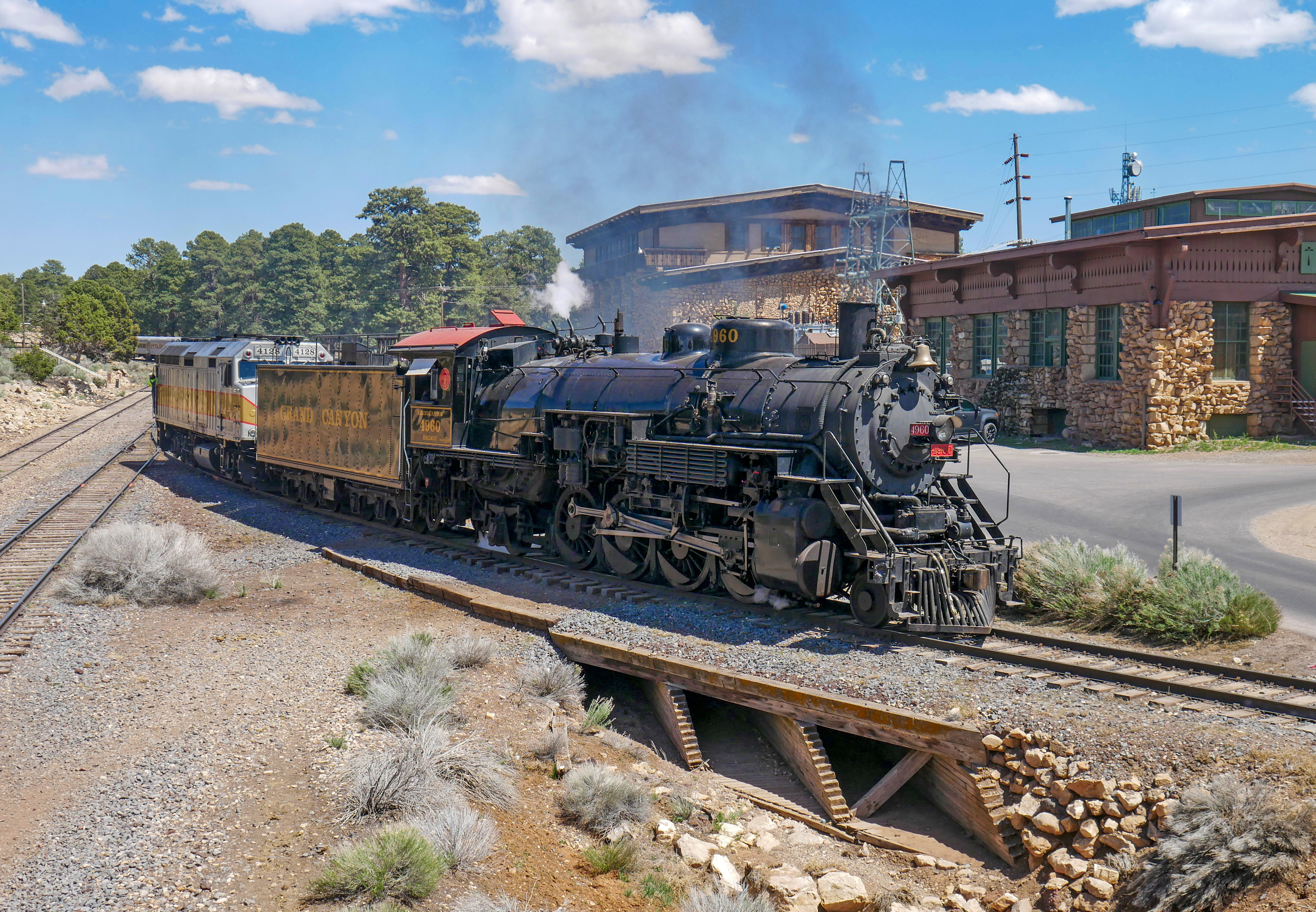
1923-built steam locomotive No. 4960 traversing near the Grand Canyon Depot

- Grand Canyon Railway Depot was completed in 1910 and contains 2 levels. Gordon Chappell, Regional Historian for the Park Service, claims that this depot building is one of only three log-cabin-style train stations currently standing, out of fourteen ever built in the U.S. The depot is the northern terminus of the Grand Canyon Railway which begins in Williams, Arizona.
- Lookout Studio, another Mary Colter design, was built in 1914. Photography, artwork, books, souvenirs, and rock and fossil specimens are sold here. A great view of Bright Angel Trail can be seen here.
- Desert View Watchtower, one of Mary Colter's best-known works, was built in 1932. Situated at the far eastern end of the South Rim, 27 miles (43 km) from Grand Canyon Village, the tower stands 70 feet (21 m) tall. The top of the tower is 7,522 feet (2,293 m) above sea level, the highest point on the South Rim. It offers one of the few full views of the bottom of the canyon and the Colorado River. It was designed to mimic Ancestral Puebloans watchtowers, though, with four levels, it is significantly taller than historical towers.
- Hermit's Rest (1914), architect: Mary Jane Colter

=== North Rim ===
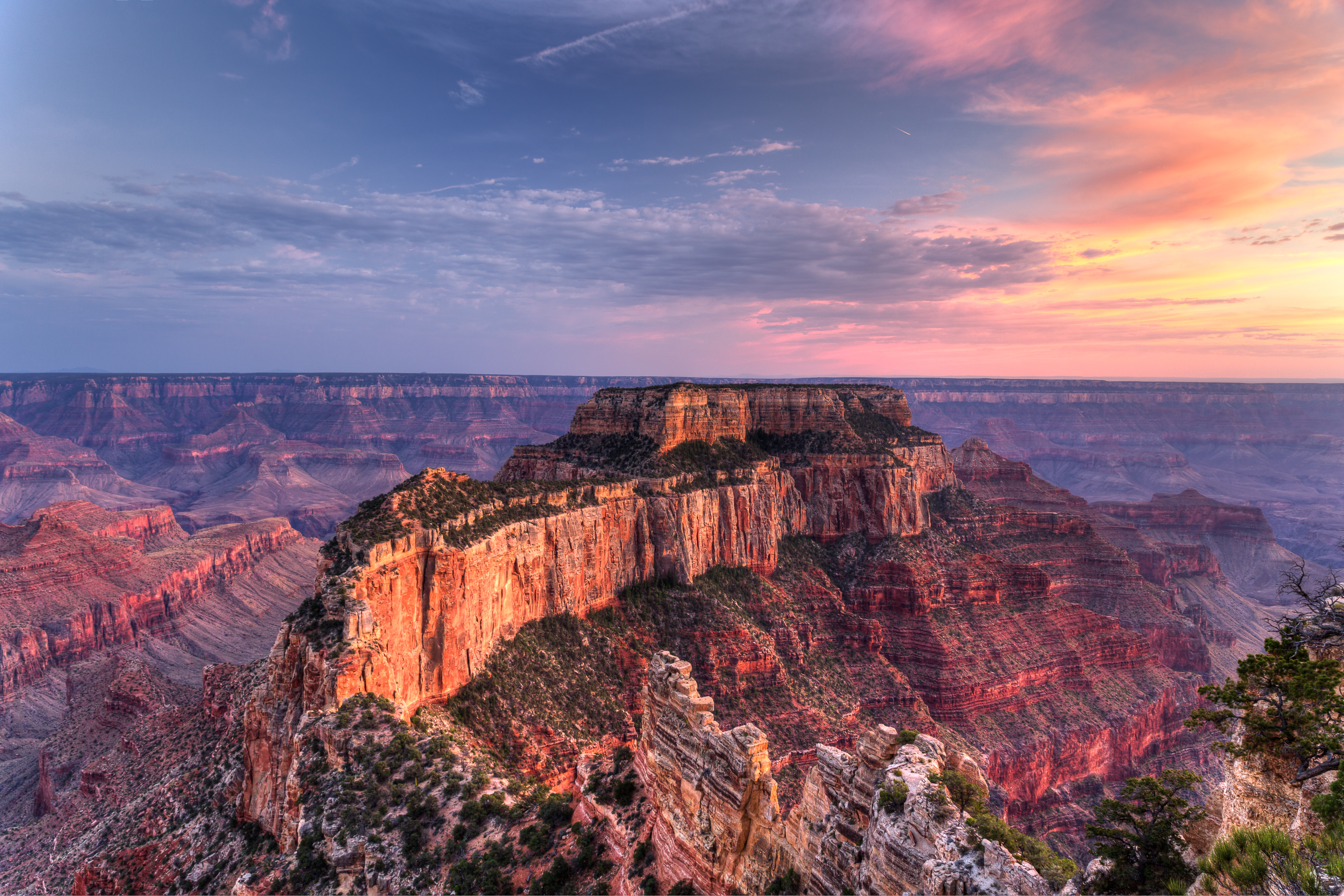
Sunset at Cape Royal Point, North Rim. Wotans Throne featured.

The North Rim area of the park is located on the Kaibab Plateau and Walhalla Plateau, directly across the Grand Canyon from the principal visitor areas on the South Rim. The North Rim's principal visitor areas are centered around Bright Angel Point. The North Rim is higher in elevation than the South Rim, at over 8,000 feet (2,400 m) of elevation. Because it is so much higher than the South Rim, it is closed from December 1 through May 15 each year, due to the enhanced snowfall at elevation. Visitor services are closed or limited in scope after October 15. Driving time from the South Rim to the North Rim is about 4.5 hours, over 220 miles (350 km).

A popular destination on the North Rim has been the historic Grand Canyon Lodge, along with the nearby Grand Canyon Inn and Campground. The main building of the Grand Canyon Lodge has been destroyed twice by fire—first in September 1932, in a fire that started in the kitchen, and again in July 2025, due to the Dragon Bravo Fire.

== Climate ==
According to the Köppen climate classification system, Grand Canyon National Park has five climate zones; Cold Semi-Arid (BSk), Humid Continental Dry Cool Summer (Dsb), Humid Continental Dry Warm Summer (Dsa), Warm Summer Mediterranean (Csb), and Hot Summer Mediterranean (Csa). The plant hardiness zone at Grand Canyon Visitor Center is 7a with an average annual extreme minimum temperature of 3.3 °F (−15.9 °C).

Climate data for Grand Canyon National Park, Arizona, 1991–2020 normals, extremes 1948–1967, 1976–present
Month	Jan	Feb	Mar	Apr	May	Jun	Jul	Aug	Sep	Oct	Nov	Dec	Year
Record high °F (°C)	64 (18)	69 (21)	77 (25)	82 (28)	92 (33)	101 (38)	97 (36)	97 (36)	93 (34)	89 (32)	74 (23)	65 (18)	101 (38)
Mean maximum °F (°C)	55.2 (12.9)	58.8 (14.9)	66.0 (18.9)	74.6 (23.7)	82.5 (28.1)	91.4 (33.0)	93.8 (34.3)	89.9 (32.2)	85.2 (29.6)	77.5 (25.3)	66.6 (19.2)	58.1 (14.5)	93.3 (34.1)
Mean daily maximum °F (°C)	44.3 (6.8)	46.3 (7.9)	53.6 (12.0)	60.9 (16.1)	69.9 (21.1)	82.0 (27.8)	84.9 (29.4)	82.1 (27.8)	75.8 (24.3)	64.6 (18.1)	53.2 (11.8)	43.0 (6.1)	63.4 (17.4)
Daily mean °F (°C)	31.7 (−0.2)	33.7 (0.9)	39.3 (4.1)	44.9 (7.2)	52.8 (11.6)	62.5 (16.9)	67.7 (19.8)	65.9 (18.8)	59.8 (15.4)	49.0 (9.4)	39.0 (3.9)	30.6 (−0.8)	48.1 (8.9)
Mean daily minimum °F (°C)	19.2 (−7.1)	21.1 (−6.1)	25.0 (−3.9)	28.8 (−1.8)	35.6 (2.0)	43.0 (6.1)	50.4 (10.2)	49.8 (9.9)	43.7 (6.5)	33.3 (0.7)	24.7 (−4.1)	18.2 (−7.7)	32.7 (0.4)
Mean minimum °F (°C)	3.8 (−15.7)	7.5 (−13.6)	14.9 (−9.5)	20.3 (−6.5)	26.3 (−3.2)	36.2 (2.3)	44.2 (6.8)	44.8 (7.1)	35.3 (1.8)	23.4 (−4.8)	11.8 (−11.2)	4.2 (−15.4)	0.4 (−17.6)
Record low °F (°C)	−17 (−27)	−20 (−29)	−7 (−22)	8 (−13)	11 (−12)	25 (−4)	35 (2)	35 (2)	22 (−6)	8 (−13)	−6 (−21)	−20 (−29)	−20 (−29)
Average precipitation inches (mm)	1.76 (45)	1.23 (31)	1.85 (47)	0.64 (16)	0.40 (10)	0.22 (5.6)	2.33 (59)	2.19 (56)	1.50 (38)	1.23 (31)	0.77 (20)	1.25 (32)	15.37 (390.6)
Average snowfall inches (cm)	12.9 (33)	7.8 (20)	8.1 (21)	2.8 (7.1)	0.1 (0.25)	0.0 (0.0)	0.0 (0.0)	0.0 (0.0)	0.0 (0.0)	1.1 (2.8)	2.2 (5.6)	8.0 (20)	43.0 (109)
Average precipitation days (≥ 0.01 in)	6.4	6.1	5.9	3.5	2.6	1.7	7.0	10.1	5.7	5.1	4.0	6.0	64.1
Average snowy days (≥ 0.1 in)	4.0	3.3	2.9	1.2	0.1	0.0	0.0	0.0	0.0	0.7	1.3	3.5	17.0
Mean monthly sunshine hours	217.0	226.0	279.0	330.0	372.0	390.0	341.0	341.0	300.0	279.0	240.0	217.0	3,532
Mean daily sunshine hours	7	8	9	11	12	13	11	11	10	9	8	7	10
Mean daily daylight hours	10.0	10.9	12.0	13.1	14.1	14.6	14.3	13.5	12.4	11.3	10.3	9.8	12.2
Percentage possible sunshine	70	73	75	84	85	89	77	81	81	80	78	71	79
Average ultraviolet index	3	4	6	8	10	11	11	10	8	5	3	2	7
Source 1: NOAA
Source 2: Weather Atlas (sun data)

Climate data for Grand Canyon National Park North Rim (Bright Angel Ranger Station), Arizona, 1991–2020 normals, 1925–present
Month	Jan	Feb	Mar	Apr	May	Jun	Jul	Aug	Sep	Oct	Nov	Dec	Year
Record high °F (°C)	63 (17)	64 (18)	67 (19)	74 (23)	85 (29)	91 (33)	92 (33)	90 (32)	88 (31)	82 (28)	66 (19)	68 (20)	92 (33)
Mean maximum °F (°C)	49.4 (9.7)	50.8 (10.4)	58.1 (14.5)	66.2 (19.0)	76.4 (24.7)	84.1 (28.9)	87.7 (30.9)	83.9 (28.8)	78.6 (25.9)	68.4 (20.2)	58.5 (14.7)	50.3 (10.2)	88.0 (31.1)
Mean daily maximum °F (°C)	36.2 (2.3)	37.3 (2.9)	44.3 (6.8)	52.2 (11.2)	62.0 (16.7)	73.4 (23.0)	77.2 (25.1)	74.1 (23.4)	67.1 (19.5)	55.6 (13.1)	44.7 (7.1)	36.4 (2.4)	55.0 (12.8)
Daily mean °F (°C)	27.1 (−2.7)	28.2 (−2.1)	33.6 (0.9)	40.2 (4.6)	48.8 (9.3)	58.2 (14.6)	63.3 (17.4)	61.2 (16.2)	54.5 (12.5)	44.3 (6.8)	34.3 (1.3)	26.9 (−2.8)	43.4 (6.3)
Mean daily minimum °F (°C)	18.0 (−7.8)	19.0 (−7.2)	23.0 (−5.0)	28.2 (−2.1)	35.6 (2.0)	42.9 (6.1)	49.3 (9.6)	48.3 (9.1)	41.9 (5.5)	33.0 (0.6)	23.9 (−4.5)	17.4 (−8.1)	31.7 (−0.2)
Mean minimum °F (°C)	−0.3 (−17.9)	2.0 (−16.7)	6.5 (−14.2)	15.0 (−9.4)	23.6 (−4.7)	31.3 (−0.4)	40.1 (4.5)	40.4 (4.7)	30.4 (−0.9)	20.1 (−6.6)	6.7 (−14.1)	−0.9 (−18.3)	−5.3 (−20.7)
Record low °F (°C)	−23 (−31)	−23 (−31)	−14 (−26)	−4 (−20)	10 (−12)	22 (−6)	26 (−3)	24 (−4)	18 (−8)	6 (−14)	−11 (−24)	−22 (−30)	−23 (−31)
Average precipitation inches (mm)	3.56 (90)	3.48 (88)	2.95 (75)	1.56 (40)	0.79 (20)	0.37 (9.4)	1.78 (45)	2.75 (70)	1.93 (49)	1.75 (44)	1.40 (36)	1.86 (47)	24.18 (613.4)
Average snowfall inches (cm)	33.0 (84)	26.6 (68)	23.6 (60)	11.4 (29)	2.7 (6.9)	0.2 (0.51)	0.0 (0.0)	0.0 (0.0)	0.0 (0.0)	3.4 (8.6)	10.3 (26)	15.0 (38)	126.2 (321.01)
Average extreme snow depth inches (cm)	30.6 (78)	36.3 (92)	36.6 (93)	18.0 (46)	2.4 (6.1)	0.0 (0.0)	0.0 (0.0)	0.0 (0.0)	0.0 (0.0)	2.5 (6.4)	7.5 (19)	15.0 (38)	44.3 (113)
Average precipitation days (≥ 0.01 in)	7.3	7.3	6.1	4.6	4.1	2.3	9.1	11.0	7.1	5.4	4.4	6.5	75.2
Average snowy days (≥ 0.1 in)	6.9	6.8	5.0	3.1	1.0	0.1	0.0	0.0	0.0	0.8	3.3	6.1	33.1
Source 1: NOAA
Source 2: National Weather Service

== Activities ==
=== North Rim ===
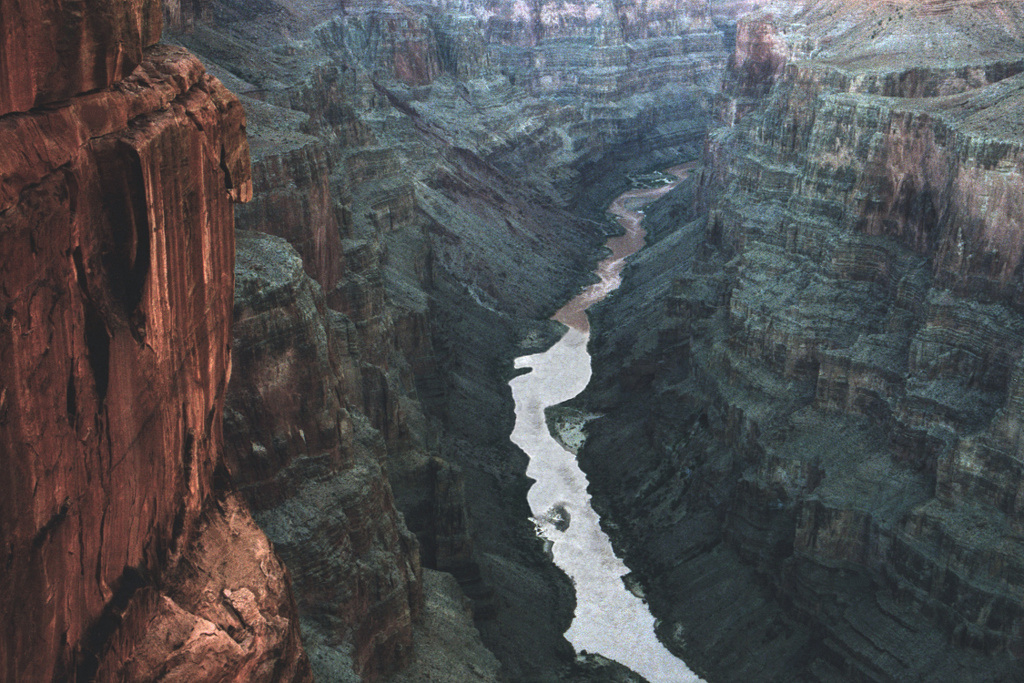
From Toroweap Overlook on the North Rim

There are few roads on the North Rim, but there are some notable vehicle-accessible lookout points, including Point Imperial, Roosevelt Point, and Cape Royal. Mule rides are also available to a variety of places, including several thousand feet down into the canyon.

Many visitors to the North Rim choose to make use of the variety of hiking trails including the Widforss Trail, Uncle Jim's Trail, the Transept Trail, and the North Kaibab Trail. The North Kaibab Trail can be followed all the way down to the Colorado River, connecting across the river to the South Kaibab Trail and the Bright Angel Trail, which continue up to the South Rim of the Grand Canyon.

The Toroweap Overlook is located in the western part of the park on the North Rim. Access is via unpaved roads off Route 389 west of Fredonia, Arizona. The roads lead through Grand Canyon–Parashant National Monument and to the overlook.

=== South Rim ===
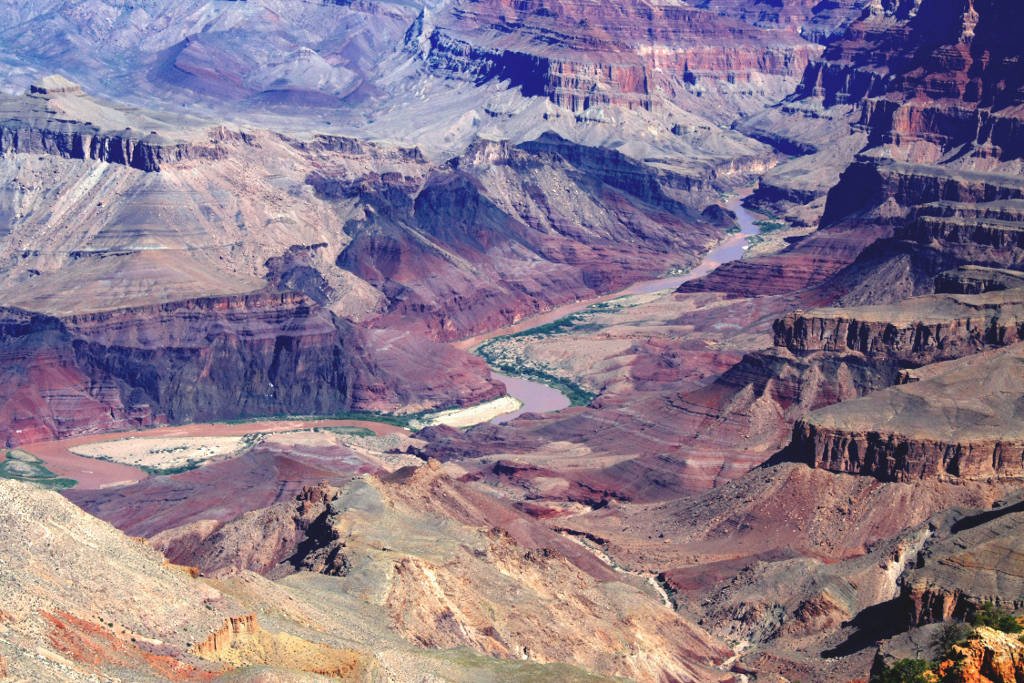
From Desert View on the South Rim

A variety of activities at the South Rim cater to park visitors. A driving tour (35 miles (56 km)) along the South Rim is split into two segments. The western drive to Hermit's Point is eight miles (13 km) with several overlooks along the way, including Mohave Point, Hopi Point, and the Powell Memorial. From March to December, access to Hermit's Rest is restricted to the free shuttle provided by the Park Service. The eastern portion to Desert View is 25 miles (40 km), and is open to private vehicles year round.

Walking tours include the Rim Trail, which runs west from the Pipe Creek viewpoint for about eight miles (13 km) of paved road, followed by seven miles (11 km) unpaved to Hermit's Rest. Hikes can begin almost anywhere along this trail, and a shuttle can return hikers to their point of origin. Mather Point, the first view most people reach when entering from the south entrance, is a popular place to begin.

Private canyon flyovers are provided by helicopters and small airplanes out of Las Vegas, Phoenix, and Grand Canyon National Park Airport. Due to a crash in the 1990s, scenic flights are no longer allowed to fly within 1,500 feet (460 m) of the rim within the Grand Canyon National Park.

== Grand Canyon Conservancy ==
The Grand Canyon Association (GCA) is the National Park Service's official nonprofit partner. It raises private funds to benefit Grand Canyon National Park by operating retail shops and visitor centers within the park, and providing educational opportunities about the natural and cultural history of the region. Its goals include:

- Creating inter-tribal cultural sites
- Dark sky preservation
- Discovery and exploration of the park
- Trail creation and preservation
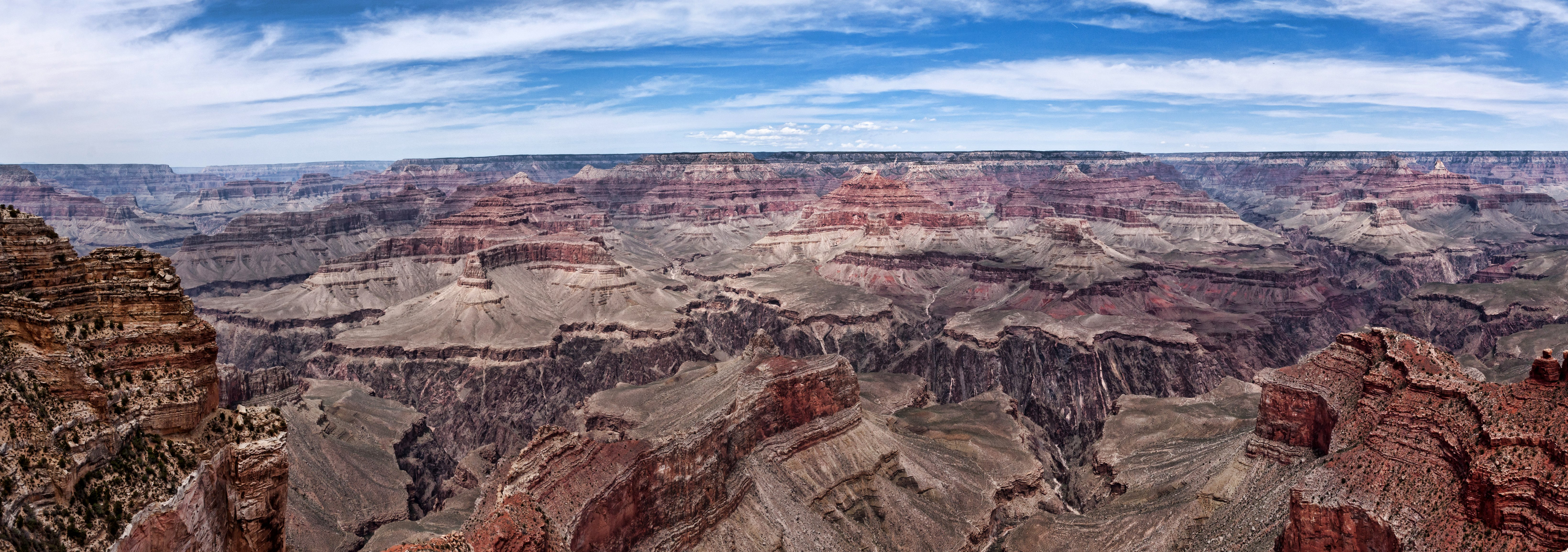
A panoramic view from the South Rim

== See also ==
Media related to Grand Canyon at Wikimedia Commons (image gallery)

- List of trails in Grand Canyon National Park
- List of national parks of the United States
