= Hermits Rest =

NRHP site in Coconino County, Arizona

- Hermit's Rest
- U.S. National Historic Landmark District – Contributing property
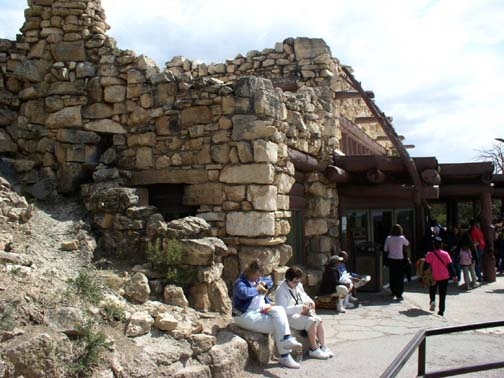
- Hermits Rest

- Location within Arizona Location within the United States
- Location: Grand Canyon National Park, Arizona
- Coordinates: 36°03′44″N 112°12′40″W
- Built: 1914
- Architect: Mary Colter
- Part of: Mary Jane Colter buildings (ID87001436)

Significant dates
- Added to NRHP: May 28, 1987
- Designated NHLDCP: May 28, 1987

Hermits Rest is a structure built in 1914 at the western end of Hermit Road at the south rim of the Grand Canyon in Arizona, United States. The Hermit Trail, a hiking trail that extends to the Colorado River, begins about ¼ mile beyond the shuttle bus stop at Hermits Rest. Hermits Rest also represents the western terminus of the Rim Trail. The location was named for Louis Boucher. Around 1891, Boucher – a Canadian-born prospector – staked claims below present-day Hermits Rest. With help, Boucher carved the aforementioned trail into the canyon, and for years lived alone at nearby Dripping Springs. The main structure currently standing at Hermits Rest was designed by architect Mary Colter. Hermits Rest is the westernmost point on the canyon's south rim that is accessible by paved road. It was built as a rest area for tourists on coaches operated by the Fred Harvey Company on the way to the now-vanished Hermit Camp. The building was designed to appear to be a natural stone formation, closely tied to the land. Colter selected furnishings that are included in the National Historic Landmark designation.

Hermits Rest is one of four Mary Jane Colter Buildings that, as a set, were added to the National Register of Historic Places and declared to be a National Historic Landmark in 1987. All were designed by Colter and were built for the Fred Harvey Company, which operated restaurants and hotels under contract with the Atchison, Topeka and Santa Fe Railway, parent of the Grand Canyon Railway.

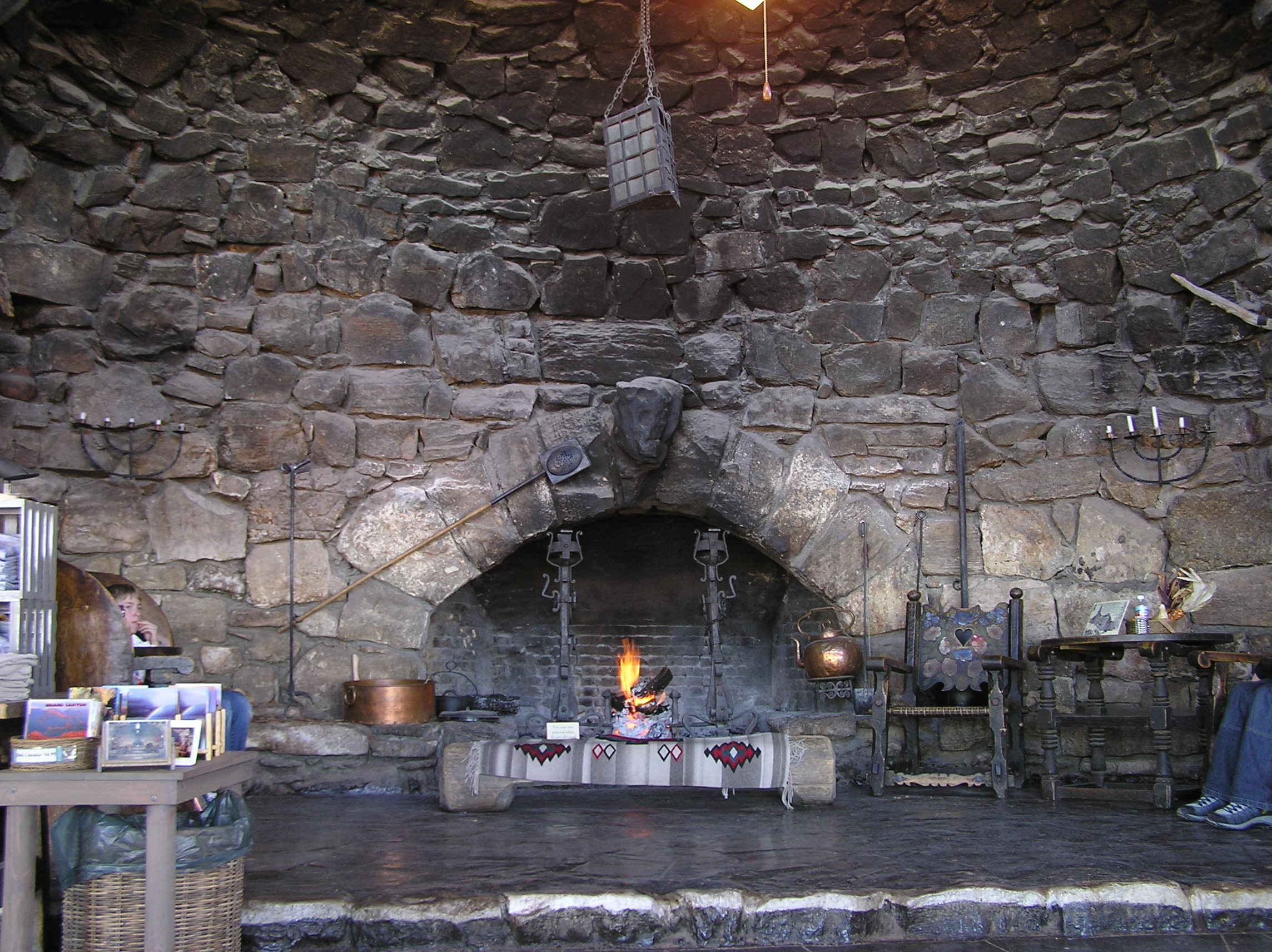
Fireplace inside Hermit's Rest

== Description ==
Hermits Rest stands a few feet from the rim of the Grand Canyon, partly buried in an earth mound. The exposed portions of the structure are designed to look like a natural rock formation, apart from the prominent rubblestone chimney. The structure is approached by a path that passes (and originally ran through) a stone arch decorated with a broken bell that Colter salvaged from a Spanish mission in New Mexico. A small porch supported by peeled log posts stands to one side of the outside observation area that overlooks the canyon rim. The low porch roof extends into the interior, which opens up to a double-height space. Opposite the entry, the south wall houses a semi-circular alcove with a fireplace and a raised floor. A snack bar opens on the west side of the space, and the "Raven Room," originally a caretaker bedroom, is on the east side with its own fireplace. The interior furnishings throughout were chosen by Colter and are part of the historic designation. The overall impression imparted by Colter's design is one of antiquity. Colter, when kidded by AT&SF executives about the dark, antique-looking interior, retorted "you can't imagine what it cost to make it look this old."

== Historic designation ==
Hermits Rest is a component of the multi-site Mary Jane Colter Buildings National Historic Landmark. It was incorporated into the National Historic Landmark group on May 28, 1987.

== See also ==
- List of National Register of Historic Places entries
- National Register of Historic Places

== Notes ==
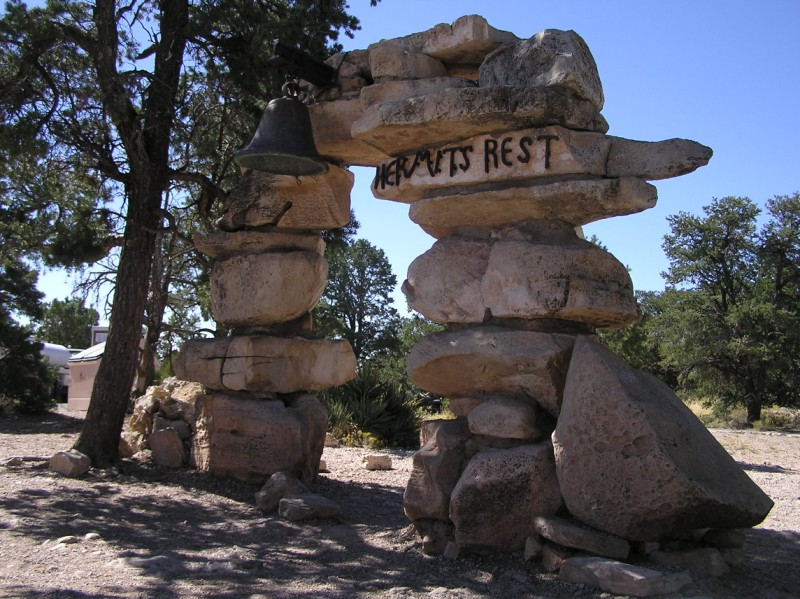
Entry arch
