= Bedrock (The Flintstones) =

Fictional town in The Flintstones

- The Flintstones location
- Bedrock at night, as seen in the closing credits of the first two seasons of The Flintstones.
- First appearance: "The Flintstone Flyer" September 30, 1960
- Created by: Hanna-Barbera
- Genre: Animated sitcom

In-universe information
- Type: City
- Locations: Slate Rock and Gravel; The Loyal Order of Water Buffaloes
- Characters: Fred Flintstone; Wilma Flintstone; Barney Rubble; Betty Rubble; Pebbles Flintstone; Bamm-Bamm Rubble; Dino; Baby Puss; Hoppy
- Population: 2,500

Bedrock is a fictional city from the animated television series The Flintstones. It is the primary setting of The Flintstones where the main characters (the Flintstone family) and their neighbors live.

== Features ==
The portrayal of Bedrock's climate varies throughout the series. While the presence of palm trees and cycads suggests a warm climate, there are episodes and movies set at Christmas time that depict snowy scenes. In different portrayals, the areas around Bedrock vary significantly. Sometimes they are shown as desert-like, while other times they appear as tropical or subtropical jungles. For instance, in the opening scenes of the animated movie The Man Called Flintstone, the outskirts are depicted as a lush jungle.

The residents of Bedrock are portrayed as friendly and quirky. They have a strong community spirit and often take part in charities and parades. Bedrock features several service organizations, the most famous being the Loyal Order of Water Buffaloes, which includes Fred Flintstone and Barney Rubble as members.

=== Law and government ===
A police department is located in the city, where the main characters Fred and Barney are sometimes employed as part-time police officers.

Bedrock also has a volunteer fire department that members use as a social club. The capability of its fire department wavers throughout different episodes, with several episodes featuring a more traditional full-time firefighting service.

There is also a military presence near Bedrock; Fred and Barney get stationed at Camp Millstone Army Base after being mistakenly inducted into the army.

Bedrock's city government plays a role in The Pebbles and Bamm-Bamm Show, episode "Mayor May Not", in which Pebbles becomes the city's temporary student mayor for a week.

Regarding health care, Bedrock has the Bedrock Rockapedic Hospital, where Pebbles Flintstone was born.

=== Media ===
For a fictional town of its size, Bedrock has a large number of media outlets. Several radio stations (one of which has the call letters BDRX), television stations, and newspapers have been depicted. One TV station is an affiliate of ABC (the Abbadabba Broadcasting Company). Later spin-offs have the people of Bedrock also enjoying a cable and satellite television service.

Television programs produced in Bedrock include the cooking program The Happy Housewife Show (which for a time starred Wilma) and the teen dance program Shinrock. Other depicted programs of Bedrock citizens, though not produced there, include such fare as Peek-a-Boo Camera', Hum-Along-With-Herman, and variety program The Ed Sulleystone Show.

One of Bedrock's fictional newspapers is The Daily Granite, edited by Lou Granite. For a time, The Daily Granite employed Wilma Flintstone and Betty Rubble as reporters. Another newspaper is The Daily Slab.

There are also two recording companies located in Bedrock: The Keen Teen Record Company and the Flippo Record Company.

=== Cultural and educational institutions ===
Bedrock is depicted as only having one high school, Bedrock High School, which is the alma mater of Fred Flintstone, his wife, Wilma, and later his daughter, Pebbles.

Universities shown in or near Bedrock include Prinstone University. Prinstone's arch-rival school is Shale University, and both universities are members of the Poison Ivy League.

In the Flintstones, Bedrock is also not far from the Oceanrock Aquarium, the home of Dripper the Sealasaurus.

=== Businesses ===
Businesses in Bedrock include bowling alleys, pool halls (including Boulder Dan's, which Fred and Barney almost bought), health clubs, hotels, supermarkets (including Safestone's), the Cobblestone Caterers catering service (as the owner proclaimed, "We're the only caterer in town!"), a costume store, and an amusement park.

Several fictional department stores service Bedrock; among them are Macyrock's (where Fred once worked as a department store Santa Claus during the Christmas season) and Gimbelstone's (where Pebbles briefly worked as a teenager).

Bedrock also features the Pyrite Advertising Agency, where Pebbles works as an adult.

In the first-season episode "The Tycoon" (in which Fred switches places with his double, J.P. Gotrocks), Bedrock is introduced by a narrator as having "a butcher, a baker and a pizza pie maker."

In the episode "The Long, Long, Long Weekend", which originally aired on January 21, 1966, Slate Rock and Gravel Company is shown as still being in business after two million years, with Mr. Slate depicted as the company's founder. In the future, the company is run by his descendant, George Slate the Eighty Thousandth. However, in Fred's dream sequence "Rip Van Flintstone", it was mentioned as having been out of business for twenty years.

In one instance, sauropod dinosaurs are seen being used as cranes at the town's most well-known employer, Slate Rock and Gravel (also known as Rockhead and Quarry Cave Construction Company in the series' earlier episodes).

=== Entertainment ===
Bedrock is depicted as having a drive-in movie theater where films such as The Monster (as seen on the marquee in the original series' opening and closing credits) and Tar Wars (produced by Gorge Lucas, as seen in the 1994 live-action movie) would play. Other features include the amphitheater the Bedrock Bowl and several nightclubs, ranging from middle-class to high-end exclusive clubs for the city's wealthy residents. The 1994 live-action movie featured the exclusive nightclub Cavern on the Green featuring its house band, The B.C. 52s. At the other end of the scale was The Poiple Dinosaur, a dive located by the wharf that was known for attracting seedy, criminal types.

=== Dining ===
Bedrock features plenty of fictional dining options including a drive-in restaurant serving brontosaurus ribs (as seen in the original series' closing credits), as well as several diners.

The two live-action films also showed Bedrock with fast-food outlets including RocDonald's and Bronto King.

Bedrock also has several upscale restaurants including the Rockadero, Maison-LaRock, and Le Chateau Rockinbleau.

=== Sports ===
Baseball, boxing, and football are all watched in Bedrock. The episode Big League Freddie shows a baseball team named the Boulder City Giants, whose home stadium is Candlestone Park. The 1981 prime-time unique Wind-Up Wilma also shows Bedrock has a baseball team called the Bedrock Dodgers.

Bedrock also features a professional football team, the Bedrock Brontos. Their rival team is the Rock Bay Pachyderms.

Boxing matches are also popular in Bedrock; a season three episode features Fred and Barney trying to see a match featuring boxer Floyd Patterstone.

=== "Stone Age" names ===
The Stone Age setting allowed for gags and wordplay involving rocks and minerals.

==== Cities/Places ====
San Antonio becomes "Sand-and-Stony-o"; the country to the south of Bedrock's land is called "Mexirock" (Mexico). Travel to "Hollyrock", a parody of Hollywood, and Sun Valley becomes "Stone Valley", run by "Conrad Hailstone" (Conrad Hilton).

Bedrock store names include:

- Toy-S-aurus (Toys "R" Us)
- Bronto King (Burger King)
- Bank of Ameroka (Bank of America)

==== People/Celebrities ====
The last names "Flintstone" and "Rubble", as well as other common Bedrock surnames such as "Shale" and "Quartz", are in line with these puns, as are the names of Bedrock's celebrities:

- "Cary Granite" (Cary Grant)
- "Stony Curtis" (Tony Curtis)
- "Ed Sulleyrock/Sulleystone" (Ed Sullivan)
- "Rock Pile/Quarry/Hudstone" (Rock Hudson)
- "Ann-Margrock" (Ann-Margret)
- "Jimmy Darrock" (James Darren)
- "Alvin Brickrock" (Alfred Hitchcock)
- "Perry Masonary/Masonite" (Perry Mason as played by Raymond Burr)
- "Gina Loadabricks" (Gina Lollobrigida)
- "Mick Jadestone and The Rolling Boulders" (Mick Jagger and The Rolling Stones, called "Mick Jagged and the Stones" in the live-action film The Flintstones in Viva Rock Vegas)
- "Eppy Brianstone" (Brian Epstein)
- "The Beau Brummelstones" (The Beau Brummels).
- A character refers to a style in "Haute Couture" as "the new Jackie Kennerock look" (Jackie Kennedy)

In some cases, the celebrity featured also provided the voice: characters Samantha and Darrin from Bewitched were voiced by Elizabeth Montgomery and Dick York. Examples from the above list include Ann-Margret, Curtis, Darren, and the Beau Brummels. Other celebrities, such as "Ed Sulleystone" and "Alvin Brickrock", were rendered by impersonators.

Some of Bedrock's sports heroes include:

- Football player "Red Granite" (Red Grange)
- Wrestler "Bronto Crushrock" (Bronko Nagurski)
- Golfer "Arnold Palmrock" (Arnold Palmer)
- Boxer "Floyd Patterstone" (Floyd Patterson)
- Boxer "Sonny Listone" (Sonny Liston)
- Baseball player "Sandy Stoneaxe" (Sandy Koufax)
- Baseball player "Lindy McShale" (Lindy McDaniel)
- Baseball player "Roger Marble" (Roger Maris)
- Baseball player "Mickey Marble" or "Mickey Mantlepiece" (Mickey Mantle)

Ace reporter "Daisy Kilgranite" (Dorothy Kilgallen) was a friend of Wilma.

Monster names include:

- "Count Rockula" (Count Dracula)
- "Rockzilla" (Godzilla)
- "Rocky Race's Penelope Pitrock" (Wacky Races's Penelope Pitstop)
- "The Frankenstone Monster" (Frankenstein's monster)

== Location ==
Bedrock is the county seat of fictional Cobblestone County and is described in the first-season episode, "The Tycoon", as being 200 feet below sea level. Presumably, the nearby town of Red Rock was located in Cobblestone County as well. However, no further information was ever given for any of these locations besides being set in a prehistoric version of the United States. Near Bedrock lies Granitetown, given in one episode as the one-time childhood hometown of Barney Rubble and Fred's boss, Mr. Slate.

Bedrock in one episode is shown as being a two-day drive from Rock Vegas, and in another episode, several hours' drive from Indianrockolis, which suggests that Bedrock might be located in what is today the Midwestern United States.

Travel to Hollyrock, the prehistoric entertainment capital of the country, usually involves an "airplane" flight—the "plane" in this case often shown as either a giant pterodactyl, with the passenger compartment being a hollowed-out log strapped to the pterodactyl's back, or a wooden plane with smaller pterodactyls on each wing as the "engines".

The season-three episode "The Buffalo Convention" shows Fred and Barney going to a lodge convention in Frantic City.

The season-two episode "The Rock Vegas Caper" shows the Flintstones and the Rubbles, while driving to Rock Vegas, passing the Grand Canyon; however, in prehistoric times the "canyon" is little more than a small stream. Fred, however, notes it "might be a big thing someday".

The season one episode "The Monster from the Tar Pit" shows Mr. Sandstone of the movie studio Miracle Pictures talking to one of his directors about staging his movie in a real town. When asked where Sandstone walks to a flat Earth globe, closes his eyes, points to an area of the map that appears to be in modern-day Northern Iowa or Southern Minnesota, and chooses Bedrock.

It has also been suggested that Bedrock is fairly close to the ocean or the Great Lakes, as the city has a yacht club, plus the Flintstones and Rubbles have taken several trips to the beach.

The episode "Shinrock-A-Go-Go", which originally aired on December 3, 1965, featured a dream sequence from Fred with an animated caricature of President Lyndon B. Johnson, as well as the United States Capitol in a prehistoric version of Washington, D.C.

== Real life ==
Several small tourist attractions and/or camper parks have been built in honor of Bedrock. The most famous and one of the oldest is Bedrock City in Custer, South Dakota, which opened in 1966 and closed in 2015. Another Bedrock City, in Valle, Arizona, opened in 1972 and continues to operate. Two Canadian Bedrock Cities, both in British Columbia, were closed and/or demolished in the late 1990s. One in Kelowna, British Columbia was closed in 1998, demolished, and changed into the Landmark Grand 10 multiplex theatre and a strip mall. The second one located in Bridal Falls, British Columbia (near Chilliwack) was closed in 1994 and was changed into a dinosaur theme park called Dinotown, in turn shut down on September 6, 2010. Another Flintstones-themed park in Canada was Calaway Park near Calgary, Alberta. It is still in operation, although the Hanna-Barbera licensing was dropped several years ago.

The reason for the closure of the two Canadian theme parks was due to licensing. Throughout the 1980s and 1990s, the licensing for any intellectual properties of Hanna-Barbera changed hands numerous times before they ended up in the possession of Time Warner.

In the late 1970s, plans were developed for a Flintstone Fun Park to be located in suburban Jackson, Mississippi but never got past the initial planning stage.

For the Flintstones feature film (1994), a street in Bedrock was built adjacent to Vasquez Rocks in California. It was open for a short time to visitors before being demolished.

In 2018, the City of Helsinki proposed adding English as the 3rd official language after Finnish and Swedish. This led to the local area of Kallio, which translates to "bedrock" in English, to be colloquially known as the namesake of the fictional city in The Flintstones. This has been exacerbated by the cultural ambiance in the area that is home to non-conformist bohemian souls, including artists and vagrants, some of whom are living in conditions very similar to the ones depicted in the prehistoric animated series.

== See also ==
- "Bedrock Anthem", a song by parodist/songwriter "Weird Al" Yankovic.
