= Bedrock City =

Bedrock City is the fictional home of The Flinstones. It may refer to several Flintstones theme parks:

- Bedrock City (Arizona)
- Bedrock City (South Dakota)
- Dinotown, formerly called "Bedrock City"
