= Williams High School (Arizona) =

Public high school in Coconino County, Arizona

Coordinates: 35°14′42″N 112°11′34″W

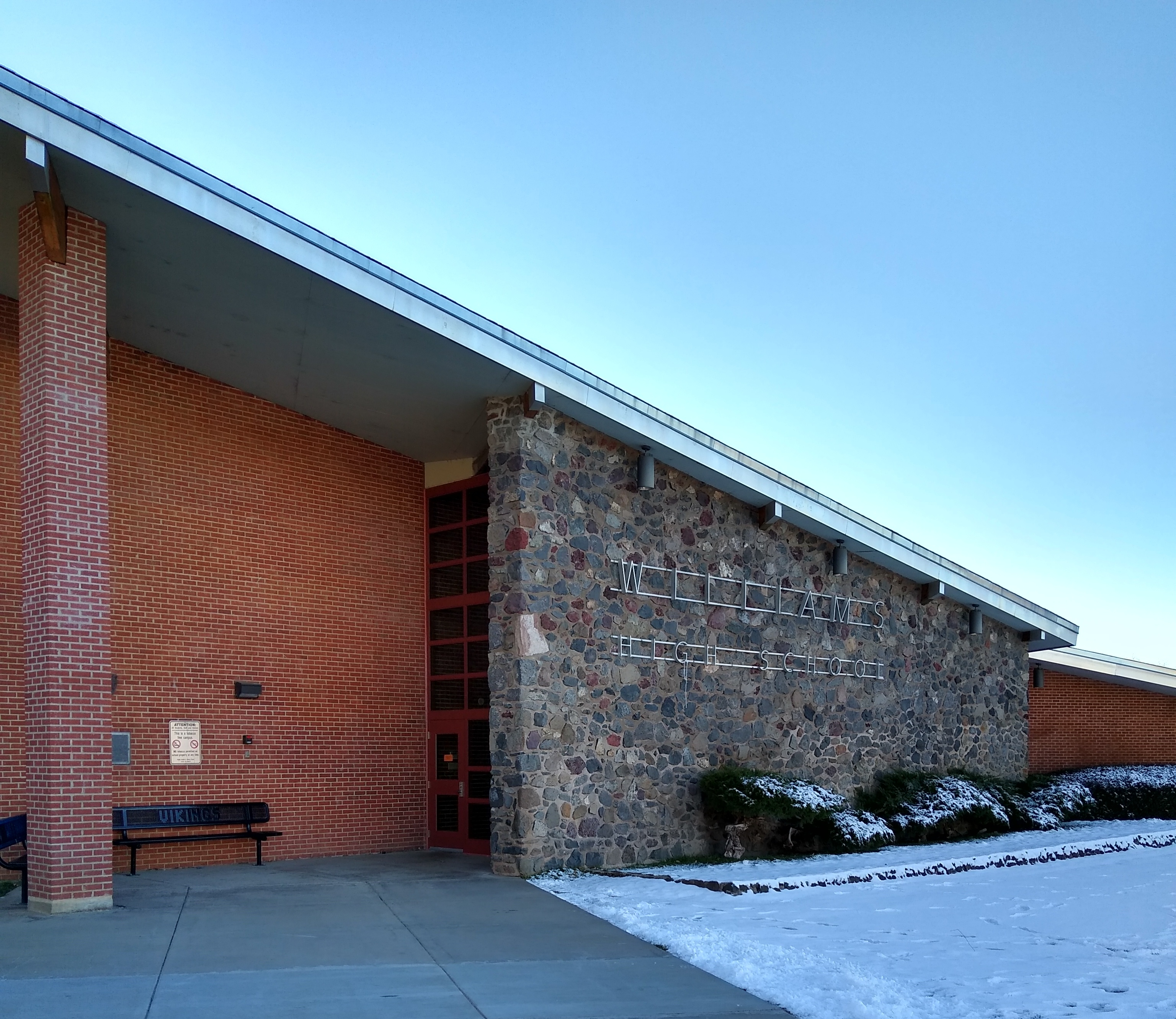

Location
- 440 S. 7th Street; Williams, Arizona 86046; United States

Information
- School type: Public high school
- Motto: Moving Forward With Pride
- Established: 1904 (122 years ago)
- School district: Williams Unified School District
- CEEB code: 030555
- Teaching staff: 18.40 (FTE)
- Grades: 9-12
- Enrollment: 250 (2023–2024)
- Student to teacher ratio: 13.59
- Colors: Black and orange
- Mascot: Vikings

Williams High School is a high school in Williams, Arizona. It is the only high school in the Williams Unified School District, which also includes a combined elementary and middle school.

The district (of which Williams High is the sole comprehensive high school) includes: Williams, Red Lake, most of Valle, a portion of Parks, and a small portion of Tusayan.

== Notable alumni ==
- Billy Hatcher, former MLB player (Chicago Cubs, Houston Astros, Pittsburgh Pirates, Cincinnati Reds, Boston Red Sox, Philadelphia Phillies, Texas Rangers)
