= Williams Middle School =

Williams Middle School may refer to:

- Williams Middle School (Moultrie, Georgia)
- Williams Middle School (Longmeadow, Massachusetts)
- David E. Williams Middle School (Kennedy Township, Pennsylvania)
- Williams Middle School (Florence, South Carolina)
- Williams Middle School (Sturgis, South Dakota)

== See also ==
- Williams High School (disambiguation)
