= Williams Unified School District =

School district in Coconino County, Arizona

Address
- 636 South 7th Street Williams, Arizona, 86046; United States

District information
- Type: Public
- Grades: PreK–12
- NCES District ID: 0409310

Students and staff
- Students: 662 (2020–2021)
- Teachers: 40.29 (on an FTE basis)
- Staff: 46.92 (on an FTE basis)
- Student–teacher ratio: 16.43:1

Other information
- Website: www.wusd2.org

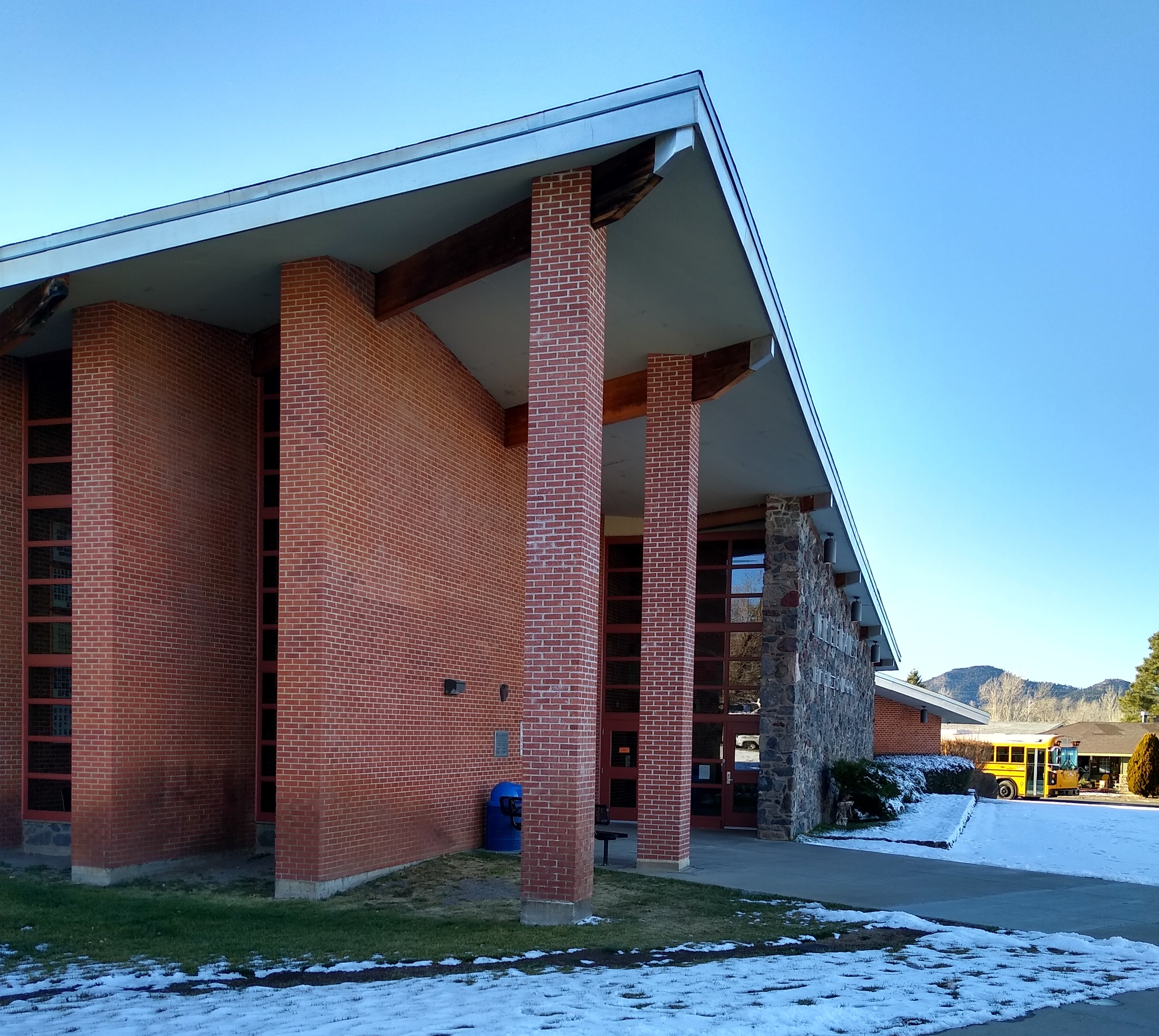
Williams High School

Williams Unified School District 2 is a unified school district located in Williams, Arizona, a town located in Coconino County. It is composed of two schools; Williams Elementary-Middle School, and Williams High School. The mascot of Williams High School is the Viking; the mascot for the Williams-Elementary Middle School is the Falcon. The current superintendent is Mr. Eric Evans, while the principals of the two schools are Dr. Connie Hargis (for the high school), and Tammara Ragsdale (for the elementary middle school).

The district includes: Williams, Red Lake, most of Valle, a portion of Parks, and a very small portion of Tusayan.

== History ==
Some areas formerly with this district were later a part of Ash Fork Joint Unified School District.
