= 40G =

40G may refer to:

- Valle Airport's FAA identifier
- 40 Gigabit Ethernet, a networking standard; see 100 Gigabit Ethernet
