= Popkum, British Columbia =

Popkum
- Unincorporated community
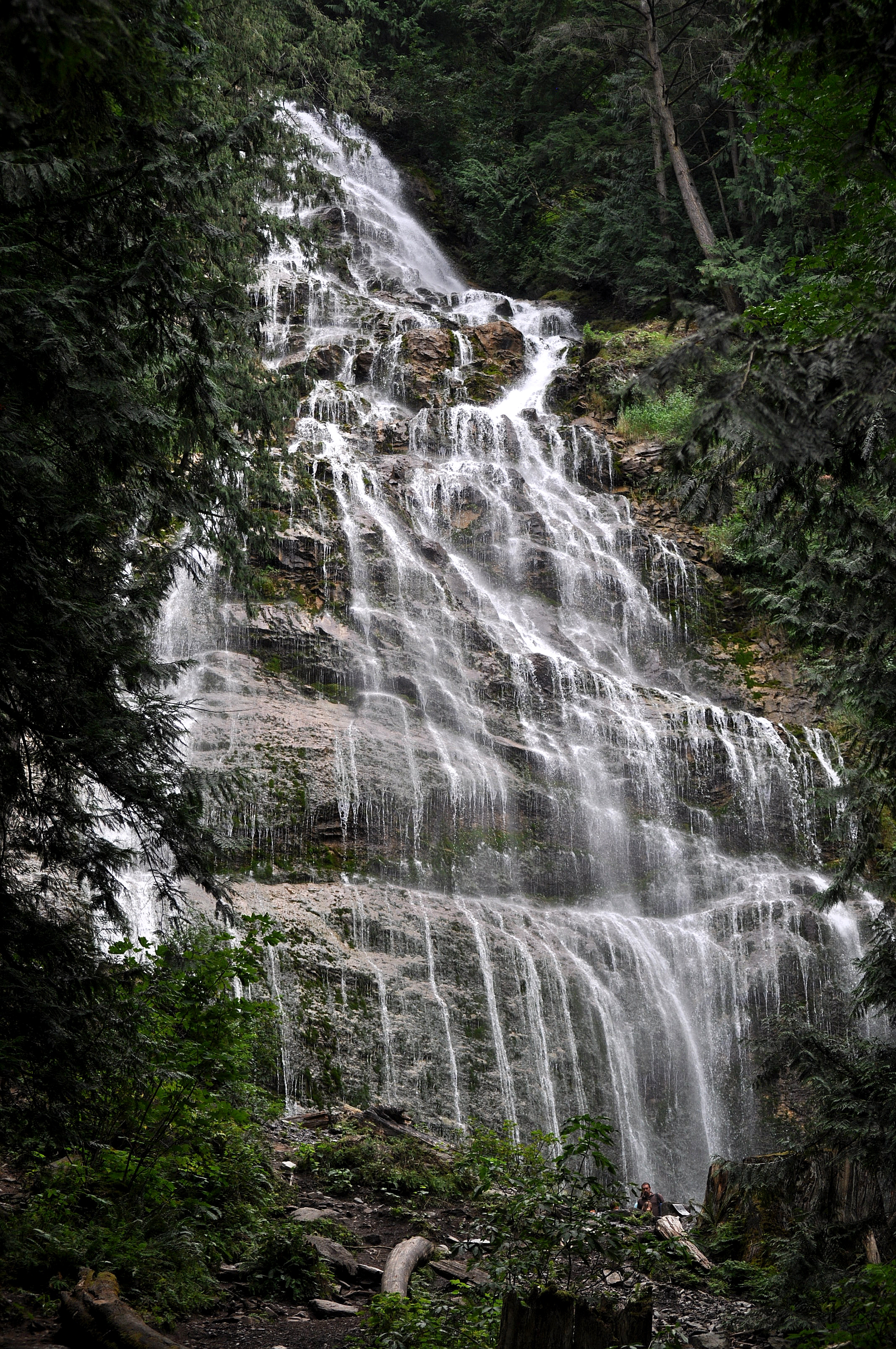

- Location of Popkum in British Columbia
- Coordinates: 49°12′00″N 121°44′00″W
- Country: Canada
- Province: British Columbia
- Regional District: Fraser Valley

Area
  - Land: 6.38 km^{2} (2.46 sq mi)

Population (2021)
  - Total: 1,710
  - Density: 268.2/km^{2} (695/sq mi)
- Time zone: UTC−07:00 (PT)
- Area codes: +1-250, +1-778

Popkum, also known as Popkum Village, is an unincorporated community in the Fraser Valley Regional District, in the census metropolitan area of Chilliwack, British Columbia, Canada. Its namesake is the indigenous Popkum First Nation and adjacent Indian reserve. The name is derived from the Halq'eméylem word Pópkw'em meaning "puffballs."

== Demographics ==
(according to 2021 Canadian census)

- Population: 1,710
- Growth Rate (2016-2021): 23.7%
- Total Private Dwellings: 570
- Land area: 6.38 km^{2}.
- Population density per km^{2}: 268.2

== Industry ==
Popkum is a tourist destination and stopping point for travellers on the Trans-Canada Highway drawn to the Bridal Veil Falls, Cheam Lake wetlands, Bridal Falls water park and Popkum Motor Park, Dinotown theme park, and The Falls Golf Club.
