= Grand Canyon High School =

High school in Grand Canyon, Arizona

Coordinates: 36°03′08″N 112°08′19″W

Location
- 100 Boulder st Grand Canyon, Arizona 86023; United States

Information
- Type: Public high school
- Established: 1911
- Status: Currently operational
- Locale: Rural: Small
- School district: Grand Canyon Unified School District
- NCES District ID: 0403550
- CEEB code: 030160
- NCES School ID: 040355000291
- Principal: Lori Rommel
- Staff: 10.02 (FTE)
- Grades: 9–12
- Enrollment: 78 (2023–2024)
- Student to teacher ratio: 7.78
- Colors: Royal Blue, Red and White
- Athletics conference: 1A
- Mascot: Phantom
- Yearbook: Canyon Shadows
- Website: www.grandcanyonschool.org

Grand Canyon High School is a public high school located near the Grand Canyon in Grand Canyon Village, Arizona. It is the only high school in the Grand Canyon Unified School District.

The area of the school district, which is the high school's attendance boundary, includes almost all of the Grand Canyon Village census-designated place, almost all of Tusayan, and a section of Valle.

== History ==
The first school at the Grand Canyon was started July 10, 1911, one year before Statehood. Ralph and Niles Cameron loaned the use of a building they owned south of the present head of Bright Angel Trail. Locally it was known as Cameron's Green House. Miss Grace Miller was the first teacher and when she left after the spring term, Miss Hammil took over the rest of the term. Judge Layton, the county circuit judge acted as school superintendent and recommended Miss Mayflower as the next teacher. W.W. Bass provided funds for lumber and labor to erect another school building that had a classroom and quarters for the teacher. The building was completed July 27, 1913. Miss Minnie Webb from Payson, Arizona, who had taught several years in China was the first teacher. The 1914-15 school year opened with 29 pupils. In 1916, the county built the next school with county funds. This building still stands on the hill south of the Fred Harvey Garage. The school board chose this location because of the proximity to water and sewer lines. Grand Canyon Village's first permanent schoolhouse was bought by Bert Lauzon in 1917 and it was moved to his homestead where it stands today.

A Parent Teachers Association was organized in 1920 and through this organization a lot of improvements came about in the way of playground equipment and entertainment for the school and community.

With the help of Senator Carl Hayden and other congressman and the Park Service, funds were secured for the present elementary school which was finished in 1940. It has been enlarged and improved over a period of time. Since 1940, the high school was built, and many other additions and improvements have been made." - Hubert Louzon, November 1992

Today, the Grand Canyon High School over 80 students 9-12. It is the only 9-12 school that is located inside a national park.

The school district offers a comprehensive education that includes advanced placement classes for high school students, Career and Technical Education classes to a complement of core academic offerings.

== Extracurricular activities ==
=== Athletics ===
Grand Canyon High School is an Arizona Interscholastic Association (AIA) member school offering boys and girls sports complying with Title IX. Student athletes can participate in varsity or junior varsity sports under the AIA's 1A Conference.

Grand Canyon Athletics consist of these sports:

- Volleyball (Girls)
- Soccer (Boys and Girls)
- Basketball (Boys and Girls)
- Track and field (Boys and Girls)†
