= Dinotown =

Defunct theme park in British Columbia

- Interactive map of Dinotown
- Location: Bridal Falls, BC, Canada
- Coordinates: 49.07419°N 121.97322°W
- Status: Defunct
- Opened: 1975; 51 years ago
- Closed: 2010; 16 years ago
- Website: Official website

Dinotown was a dinosaur theme park in British Columbia, Canada, which operated from 1975 to 2010. Originally located in the lower Cultus Lake area and close to Bridal Falls in Chilliwack, British Columbia, Canada, it opened under the name Bedrock City and based around The Flintstones licensing. It reopened in 1995 under non-licensed dinosaur theming, and closed in 2010. From 2011 onwards, some temporary Dinotown exhibits operated in other locations.

== History ==
The Ell family opened Bedrock City in 1975. Buildings were based on the Bedrock city, featured in the Hanna-Barbera animated television series The Flintstones. Three other themed attractions held a Flintstones license, aside from the Kings Entertainment Company parks.

The park acquired large pipe, angle-iron and cement dinosaurs from Dyck's Dinosaur Park in Maple Ridge. The park included a "Jurassic Exhibit" on loan from the Royal Tyrrell Museum, a paleontology museum in Drumheller, Alberta. As of 2000, the park had a White Spot hamburger and casual dining restaurant, dubbed White Spot Dinersaurus.

The attraction would have a promotional Kids Playce at the Pacific National Exhibition some years, to preview their attraction. Further abroad, the characters appeared with Katie Couric on NBC's Today Show, and appeared at the American Museum of Natural History's Inaugural Trick or Treat with the Dinosaurs.

The park closed on September 6, 2010. The site of Dinotown is to become an 18-acre (7.3 ha) stratified manufactured home park, developed by Tri-R Development Group.

Talks were held with the Greater Vancouver Zoo, in Aldergrove, British Columbia, but they did not proceed further. Talks with the Pacific National Exhibition did not work out. The City of Surrey Economic Development Office approached Ell about relocating. Also listed were locations in South Surrey, Burnaby, and the "largest Ostrich farm in China".

In 2012, Dinotown Live was created and set up on the Cloverdale Fairgrounds for the summer and 2013 at Bridal Falls. For the summer of 2014, 2015 and 2016 Dinotown Funland operated at Cultus Lake, B.C. on 5 acres (2.0 ha), across from the Cultus Lake Water Park.

As of April 2021, they are "currently in discussions" with multiple lower mainland locations including Vancouver, Surrey, New Westminster and Richmond to re-open the park on a permanent basis.
