= Williams High School =

Williams High School may refer to schools in the United States:

- Williams High School (Arizona), Williams, Arizona
- Williams High School (Stockbridge, Massachusetts), Stockbridge, Massachusetts
- Archbishop Williams High School, Braintree, Massachusetts
- T. C. Williams High School, Alexandria, Virginia
- T. H. Williams High School, Plano, Texas
- Walter M. Williams High School, Burlington, North Carolina
