= Grand Canyon Village, Arizona =

Town in Arizona, United States

- CDP
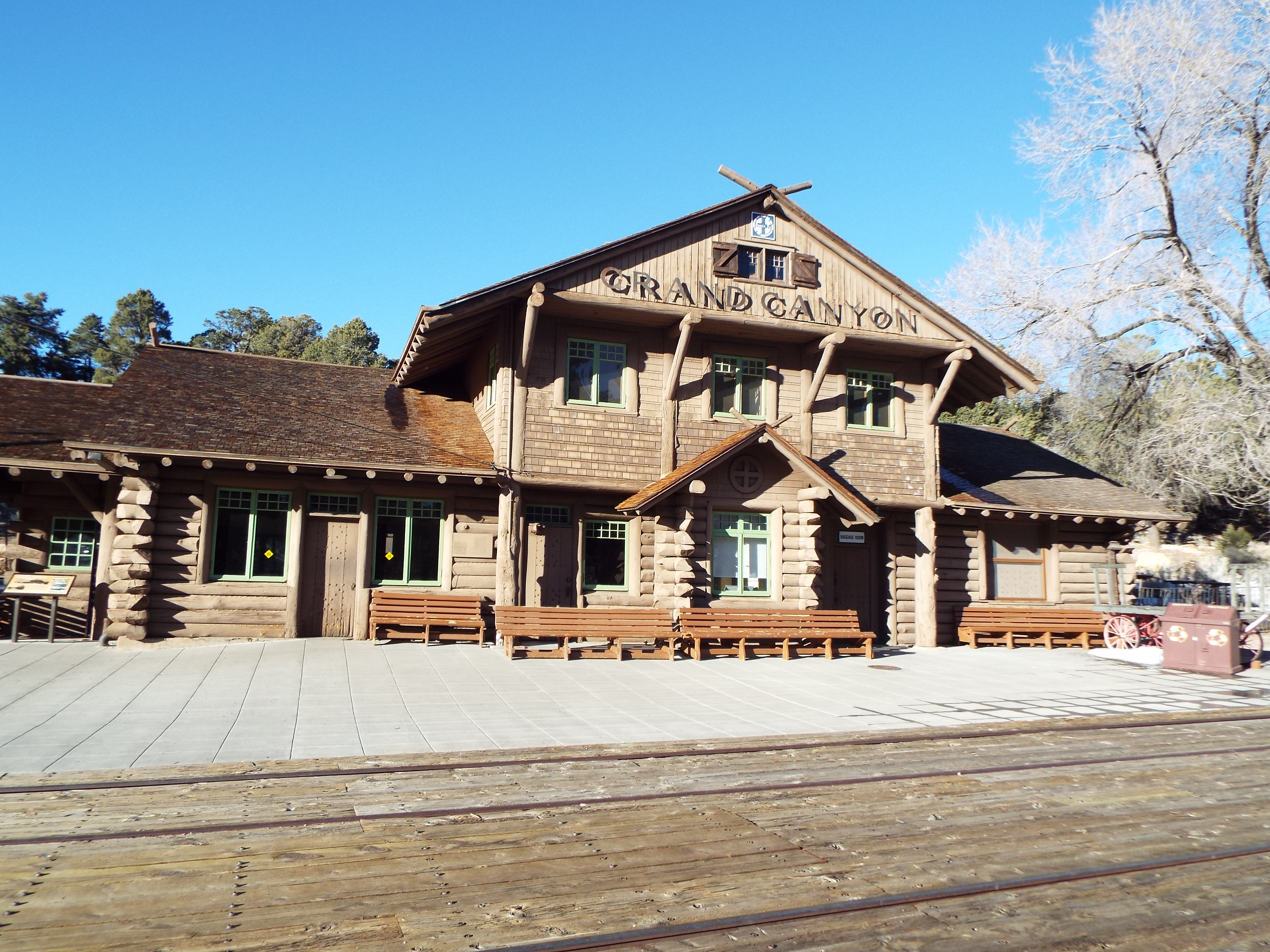
- Historic Grand Canyon Railroad Depot
- Location of Grand Canyon Village in Coconino County, Arizona
- Location in the United States
- Coordinates: 36°02′57″N 112°09′24″W
- Country: United States
- State: Arizona
- County: Coconino County

Area
  - Total: 26.66 sq mi (69.05 km^{2})
  - Land: 26.64 sq mi (69.01 km^{2})
  - Water: 0.019 sq mi (0.05 km^{2})
- Elevation: 6,804 ft (2,074 m)

Population (2020)
  - Total: 1,784
  - Density: 67.0/sq mi (25.85/km^{2})
- Time zone: UTC-7 (MST)
- ZIP Code: 86023
- Area code: 928
- FIPS code: 04-2408314
- GNIS feature ID: 2408314

- Grand Canyon Village Historic District
- U.S. National Register of Historic Places
- U.S. National Historic Landmark District
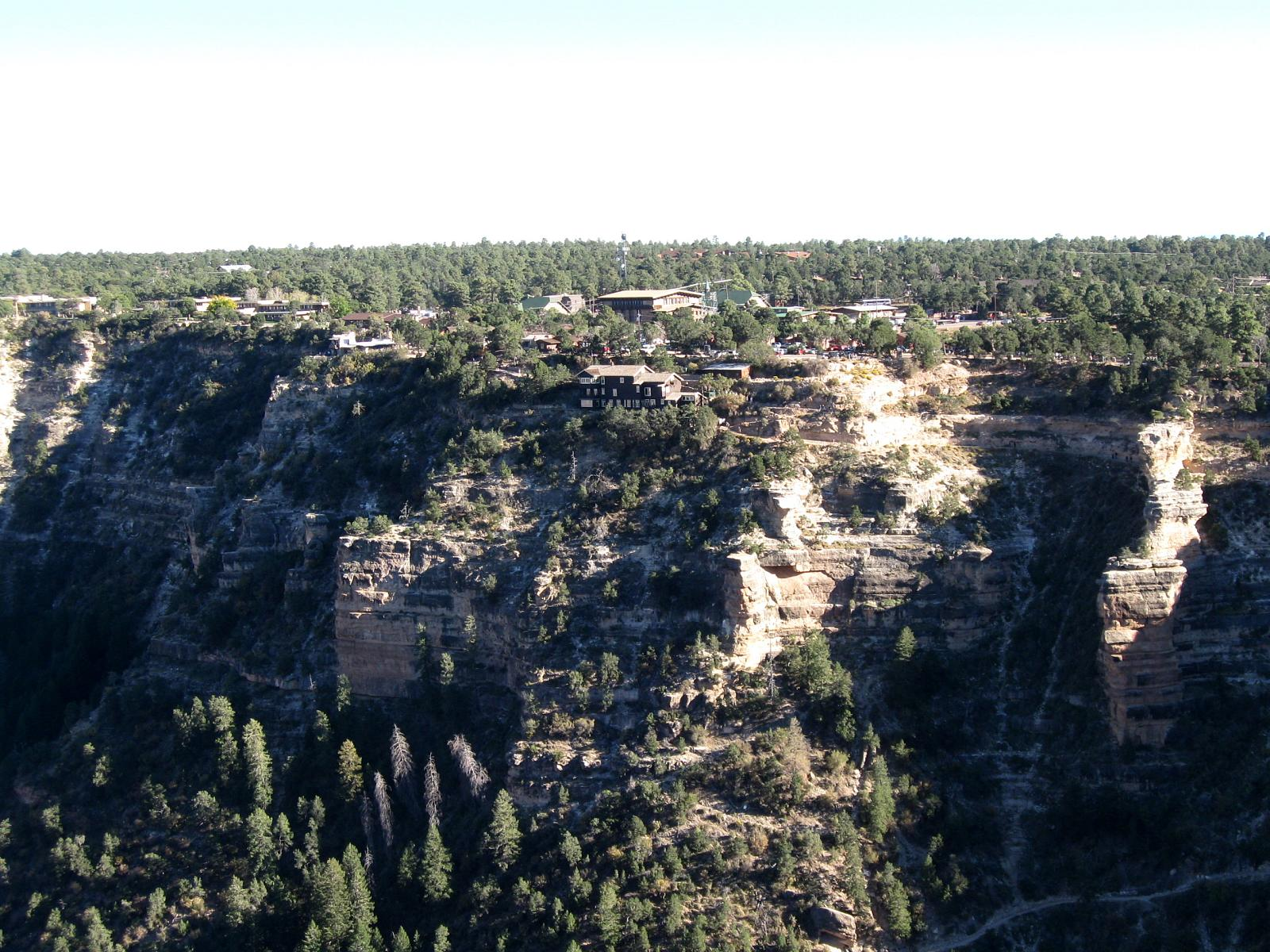
- Grand Canyon Village
- Location: Grand Canyon, Arizona
- Coordinates: 36°3′20″N 112°8′18″W
- Architect: Daniel Ray Hull, Kolb, Ellsworth & Emery; Mary E.J. Colter; Charles Whittlesey
- Architectural style: Park Service Rustic, Pueblo, Bungalow/craftsman
- NRHP reference No.: 75000343 (original); 95001226 (increase)

Significant dates
- Added to NRHP: November 20, 1975
- Boundary increase: October 24, 1995
- Designated NHLD: February 18, 1987

Grand Canyon Village is a census-designated place (CDP) located on the South Rim of the Grand Canyon, in Coconino County, Arizona, United States. Its population was 2,004 at the 2010 Census. Located in Grand Canyon National Park, it is wholly focused on accommodating tourists visiting the canyon. Its origins trace back to the railroad completed from Williams, to the canyon's South Rim by the Santa Fe Railroad in 1901. Many of the structures in use today date from that period. The village contains numerous landmark buildings, and its historic core is a National Historic Landmark District, designated for its outstanding implementation of town design. The Grand Canyon Village Historic District includes numerous landmark park structures, many of which are National Historic Landmarks themselves, or are listed on the National Register of Historic Places. The town design as a whole is also significant for its attention to integration with the Grand Canyon landscape, its incorporation of National Park Service Rustic design elements, and for the idiosyncratic design of park concessioner structures such as the El Tovar Hotel.

== Design and history ==
Grand Canyon Village was planned by the National Park Service to be a comprehensive development for tourism on the South Rim. It is the largest example of Park Service town planning extant in the national park system. Initially centered on the terminus of the Grand Canyon Railway, the village expanded as both the Park Service and the park concessioner, the Fred Harvey Company, built or expanded facilities. Initial development was centered on the El Tovar Hotel and the Bright Angel Lodge, both concessioner-operated facilities. The El Tovar was opened in 1905 as a destination hotel on the canyon rim by the Atchison, Topeka and Santa Fe Railway, who owned the Grand Canyon spur. A new train depot was built next to the hotel by the railway in 1909. Nearly all early development at the village was undertaken by concessioners.

In 1910, while the Grand Canyon was still designated a national monument, Secretary of the Interior Richard A. Ballinger suggested that a plan be established before further development took place at the South Rim. Mark Daniels, the general superintendent of the parks from 1914, called for similar comprehensive planning to establish water and sewer systems, power distribution and telephone networks. A 1924 master plan by National Park Service landscape architect Daniel Ray Hull established a "village square" at the intersection of the railroad and east road just below the El Tovar. The first park administration building was established there. Hull used the local topography, dictated by Bright Angel Wash valley's topography, with residential neighborhoods on two small hills divided by a branch of the Bright Angel drainage, away from the main south entrance road down Bright Angel and keeping hotel development in the area of the Bright Angel Camp and the El Tovar. Another square or plaza was intended where the new south entrance road approached the rim, surrounded by another administration building, a post office, and a proposed museum. Over time, the plaza became a parking area. Treatment of residential areas varied, including use of bungalows. Park Service housing was arranged so that automobile access was to the rear, with the house fronts oriented to a central communal space. Grand Canyon Village is one of the earliest uses of this arrangement in a planned community, predating its use at Radburn, New Jersey by Clarence Stein and Henry Wright. Housing for Fred Harvey Company personnel was arranged in a more traditional street-facing arrangement, with a parallel system of alleys for access to garages at the rear of the lots.

Much of the work that was accomplished in the late 1930s was done by Civilian Conservation Corps labor, particularly the landscaping, which involved the transplantation of native vegetation into areas that had been disturbed by construction.

=== Landmark designation ===
The village's initial listing on the National Register of Historic Places on November 20, 1975 included 39 buildings, then was expanded in 1982 to include the Bright Angel Lodge and an additional 25 buildings. The district was declared a National Historic Landmark District on February 18, 1987. On October 24, 1995 the district was again expanded to include the historic center of Grand Canyon Village. The present district includes 247 buildings, 55 landscape structures and three sites. The NRHP district differs from the NHL district by its inclusion of two non-contiguous cemeteries, not part of the NHL since they have no association with park architecture.

== Geography and transportation ==
According to the United States Census Bureau, the CDP has a total area of 13.4 square miles (35 km^{2}), all land.

It is located 180 miles (290 km) north of Phoenix, and 168 miles (270 km) from Las Vegas.

Groome Transportation provides scheduled service between Grand Canyon Village and Flagstaff, Arizona. Trans-Canyon Shuttle provides seasonal scheduled services between Grand Canyon Village and North Rim, Arizona, and seasonal service between Grand Canyon Village and Marble Canyon. National Park Express provides a daily shuttle between Page and Grand Canyon Village.

The Grand Canyon Railway connects the Grand Canyon Depot in Grand Canyon Village with the Williams Depot in Williams, Arizona. Connections were offered to Amtrak's Williams Junction station until 2017, when the station was closed.

The National Park Service operates free shuttle buses on the South Rim.

=== Climate ===
Climate data for Grand Canyon Village, Arizona (1991-2020 normals, extremes 1976-2012)
Month	Jan	Feb	Mar	Apr	May	Jun	Jul	Aug	Sep	Oct	Nov	Dec	Year
Record high °F (°C)	64 (18)	69 (21)	77 (25)	82 (28)	92 (33)	97 (36)	101 (38)	97 (36)	93 (34)	89 (32)	74 (23)	65 (18)	101 (38)
Mean daily maximum °F (°C)	44.3 (6.8)	46.3 (7.9)	53.6 (12.0)	60.9 (16.1)	69.9 (21.1)	82.0 (27.8)	84.9 (29.4)	82.1 (27.8)	75.8 (24.3)	64.6 (18.1)	53.2 (11.8)	43.0 (6.1)	63.4 (17.4)
Daily mean °F (°C)	31.7 (−0.2)	33.7 (0.9)	39.3 (4.1)	44.9 (7.2)	52.8 (11.6)	62.5 (16.9)	67.7 (19.8)	65.9 (18.8)	59.8 (15.4)	49.0 (9.4)	39.0 (3.9)	30.6 (−0.8)	48.1 (8.9)
Mean daily minimum °F (°C)	19.2 (−7.1)	21.1 (−6.1)	25.0 (−3.9)	28.8 (−1.8)	35.6 (2.0)	43.0 (6.1)	50.4 (10.2)	49.8 (9.9)	43.7 (6.5)	33.3 (0.7)	24.7 (−4.1)	18.2 (−7.7)	32.7 (0.4)
Record low °F (°C)	−17 (−27)	−20 (−29)	−1 (−18)	8 (−13)	16 (−9)	25 (−4)	35 (2)	35 (2)	24 (−4)	8 (−13)	−6 (−21)	−20 (−29)	−20 (−29)
Average precipitation inches (mm)	1.76 (45)	1.23 (31)	1.85 (47)	0.64 (16)	0.4 (10)	0.22 (5.6)	2.33 (59)	2.19 (56)	1.5 (38)	1.23 (31)	0.77 (20)	1.25 (32)	15.37 (390.6)
Average snowfall inches (cm)	12.9 (33)	7.8 (20)	8.1 (21)	2.8 (7.1)	0.1 (0.25)	0.0 (0.0)	0.0 (0.0)	0.0 (0.0)	0.0 (0.0)	1.1 (2.8)	2.2 (5.6)	8.0 (20)	43 (109.75)
Average precipitation days (≥ 0.01 in)	6.4	6.1	5.9	3.5	2.6	1.7	7.0	10.1	5.7	5.1	4.0	6.0	64.1
Average snowy days (≥ 0.01 in)	4.0	3.3	2.9	1.2	0.1	0.0	0.0	0.0	0.0	0.7	1.3	3.5	17
Source: NOAA

== Demographics ==
Historical population
Census	Pop.	Note	%±
1990	1,499		—
2000	1,460		−2.6%
2010	2,004		37.3%
2020	1,784		−11.0%
U.S. Decennial Census

=== 2020 census ===
As of the 2020 census, Grand Canyon Village had a population of 1,784. The median age was 38.9 years. 11.9% of residents were under the age of 18 and 6.8% of residents were 65 years of age or older. For every 100 females there were 115.2 males, and for every 100 females age 18 and over there were 119.1 males age 18 and over.

0.0% of residents lived in urban areas, while 100.0% lived in rural areas.

There were 659 households in Grand Canyon Village, of which 19.4% had children under the age of 18 living in them. Of all households, 32.2% were married-couple households, 36.1% were households with a male householder and no spouse or partner present, and 26.1% were households with a female householder and no spouse or partner present. About 50.3% of all households were made up of individuals and 6.4% had someone living alone who was 65 years of age or older.

There were 898 housing units, of which 26.6% were vacant. The homeowner vacancy rate was 0.0% and the rental vacancy rate was 3.3%.

Racial composition as of the 2020 census
Race	Number	Percent
White	1,084	60.8%
Black or African American	51	2.9%
American Indian and Alaska Native	361	20.2%
Asian	64	3.6%
Native Hawaiian and Other Pacific Islander	0	0.0%
Some other race	116	6.5%
Two or more races	108	6.1%
Hispanic or Latino (of any race)	225	12.6%

=== 2000 census ===
As of the census of 2000, there were 1,460 people, 651 households, and 345 families residing in the CDP. The population density was 108.6 inhabitants per square mile (41.9/km^{2}). There were 791 housing units at an average density of 100.8 per square mile (38.9/km^{2}). The racial makeup of the CDP was 73.7% White, 1.6% Black or African American, 18.8% Native American, 0.9% Asian, 0.3% Pacific Islander, 1.9% from other races, and 2.9% from two or more races. 10.2% of the population were Hispanic or Latino of any race.

There were 651 households, out of which 24.9% had children under the age of 18 living with them, 42.1% were married couples living together, 6.0% had a female householder with no husband present, and 46.9% were non-families. 31.6% of all households were made up of individuals, and 0.9% had someone living alone who was 65 years of age or older. The average household size was 2.18 and the average family size was 2.84.

In the CDP, the population was spread out, with 20.5% under the age of 18, 8.4% from 18 to 24, 41.2% from 25 to 44, 27.7% from 45 to 64, and 2.2% who were 65 years of age or older. The median age was 37 years. For every 100 females, there were 114.7 males. For every 100 females age 18 and over, there were 110.1 males.

The median income for a household in the CDP was $42,083, and the median income for a family was $53,676. Males had a median income of $28,750 versus $23,565 for females. The per capita income for the CDP was $19,923. About 1.7% of families and 4.8% of the population were below the poverty line, including 4.9% of those under age 18 and none of those age 65 or over.

== Media ==
KUGO 102.5 FM is licensed to Grand Canyon Village and broadcasts travelers' information for visitors to the Grand Canyon.

== Education ==
The area is served by the Grand Canyon Unified School District, which includes Grand Canyon High School.

== Historic structures ==
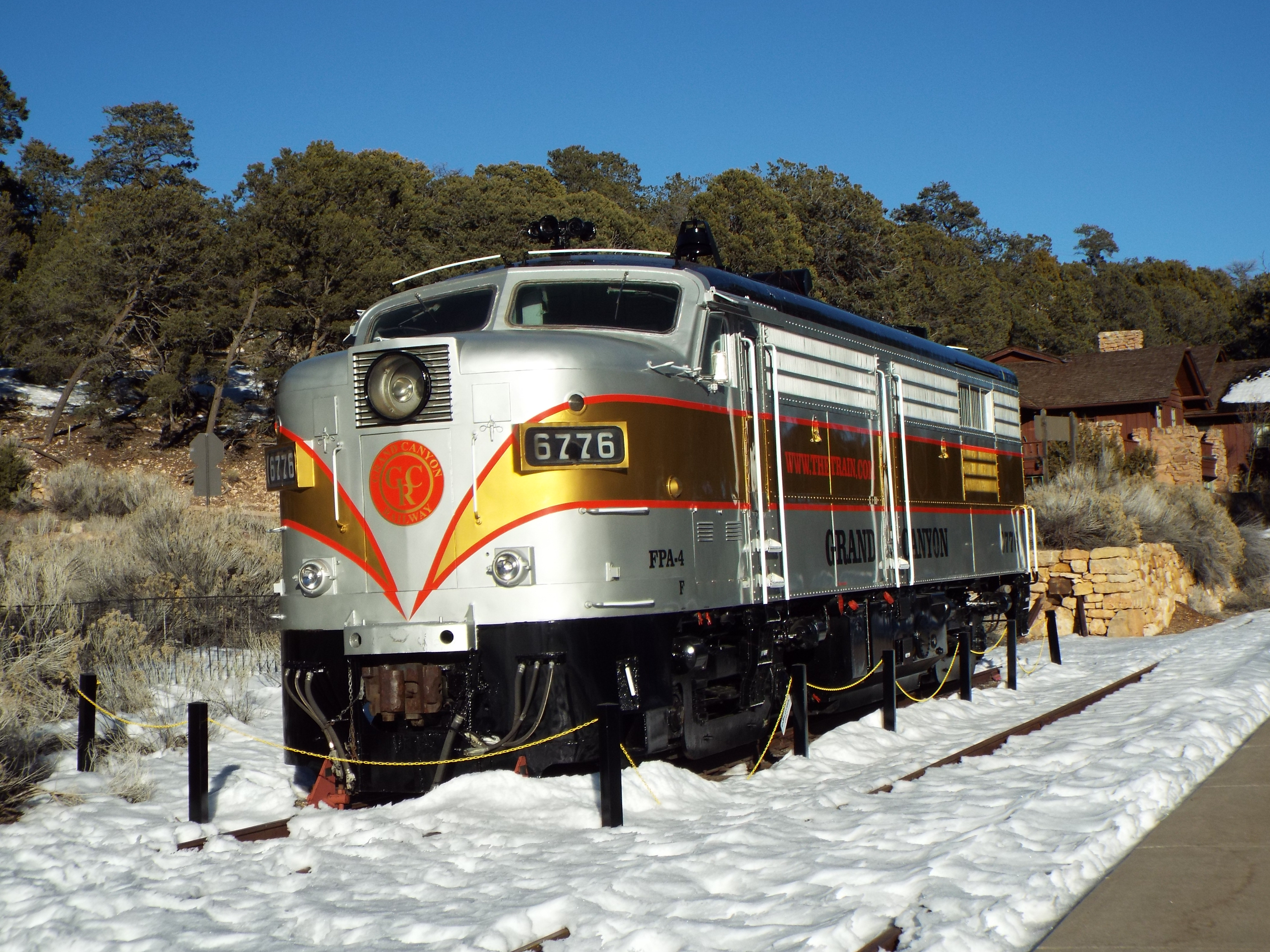
Grand Canyon Railway Diesel Locomotive No. 6776-Alco FPA-4 built in 1958

The district includes a number of significant structures, some of them National Historic Landmarks in their own right, with several others individually listed on the National Register of Historic Places. The buildings can be divided into two categories: the fanciful structures built by park concessioners, many of which were designed by Mary Colter, and the more restrained examples of National Park Service Rustic architecture designed by Hull and Thomas Chalmers Vint for park administration and housing.

== See also ==
- Architects of the National Park Service
- National Register of Historic Places listings in Grand Canyon National Park
- Rustic architecture in Arizona
