= Gateway community =

Towns near major tourist attractions

Gateway communities are cities or towns that lie just outside major tourist attractions such as national parks, wilderness areas, or nature resort areas. Examples of gateway communities in the US include Jackson, Wyoming; Tusayan, Arizona; and Gardiner, Montana.

These places provide services for guests of the adjacent attractions, such as gas, food, and lodging, and as a result rely upon these attractions to sustain their economy. Since they are neighbors, management actions taken by either the attraction or the community itself have direct impacts on one another. Shared social, economic and ecological impacts are some of the primary considerations. For example, increased seasonal tourist activity can put significant strain on the infrastructure of gateway communities.

Economically, while tourism can be a boon, it can also price locals out of the community. Land prices close to Yellowstone National Park increased by 330% in the 15 years between 1981 and 1996. Near Grand Teton National Park in Wyoming, many locals live in the more distant communities found in neighboring Idaho (Driggs and Victor) rather than in Jackson, WY.

Ecological implications including those of watershed management, fire management in urban and wildland contexts, and noise and air pollution are concerns common to gateway communities and their neighboring attractions. Because of this shared responsibility, managing agencies often form partnerships with local municipal authorities.

== List of gateway communities ==
=== For national parks in USA ===
National Park	Community
Acadia National Park	Bar Harbor, ME
Arches National Park	Moab, UT
Badlands National Park	Wall, SD
Big Bend National Park	Terlingua, TX
Biscayne National Park	Homestead, FL
Bryce Canyon National Park	Bryce Canyon City, UT
Dry Tortugas National Park	Key West, FL
Everglades National Park	Homestead, FL
Glacier National Park	Kalispell, MT
Grand Canyon National Park	Tusayan, AZ
Grand Canyon National Park	Williams, AZ
Grand Teton National Park	Jackson, WY
Great Sand Dunes National; Park and Preserve	Alamosa, CO
Great Smoky Mountains; National Park	Gatlinburg, TN
Great Smoky Mountains; National Park	Pigeon Forge, TN
Great Smoky Mountains; National Park	Cherokee, NC
Hot Springs National Park	Hot Springs, AR
Kenai Fjords National Park	Seward, AK
Mammoth Cave National Park	Cave City, KY
Olympic National Park	Port Angeles, WA
Rocky Mountain National Park	Estes Park, CO
Voyageurs National Park	International Falls, MN
White Sands National Park	Alamogordo, NM
Yellowstone National Park	Gardiner, MT
Yellowstone National Park	West Yellowstone, MT
Yellowstone National Park	Jackson, WY
Zion National Park	Springdale, UT
