= Grand Canyon Unified School District =

Public school district in Arizona, U.S.

Location
- Grand Canyon Village, Arizona; United States
- Coordinates: 36.0524°N 112.1383°W

District information
- Type: Public
- Established: 1911; 114 years ago
- Superintendent: Matthew Yost

Students and staff
- Enrollment: 300
- District mascot: Phantom

Other information
- Website: www.grandcanyonschool.org

The Grand Canyon Unified School District #4 is a school district located in Grand Canyon Village in unincorporated Coconino County, Arizona, United States.

It includes almost all of the Grand Canyon Village census-designated place, almost all of Tusayan, and a section of Valle.

== Overview ==
The district operates under the leadership of superintendent, Matthew Yost and interim principal, Lori Rommel and five school board members.

Students in grades K-12 attend school on a campus with six buildings. The school has a four-day week; elementary students K-5 attend from 7:50 to 3:50 while grades 6-12 attend from 7:50-4:02.

== Schools ==
- Grand Canyon Elementary School (grades K-8; 223 students)
- Grand Canyon High School (grades 9–12; 80 students)

== History ==
On July 10, 1911, the first school in the Grand Canyon opened. In 1916, the first county-funded schoolhouse was built, which still exists. Four years later, a parent-teacher association was formed.
