= Bridal Veil Falls Provincial Park =

Provincial park

Coordinates: 49°11′N 121°44′W

Bridal Veil Falls
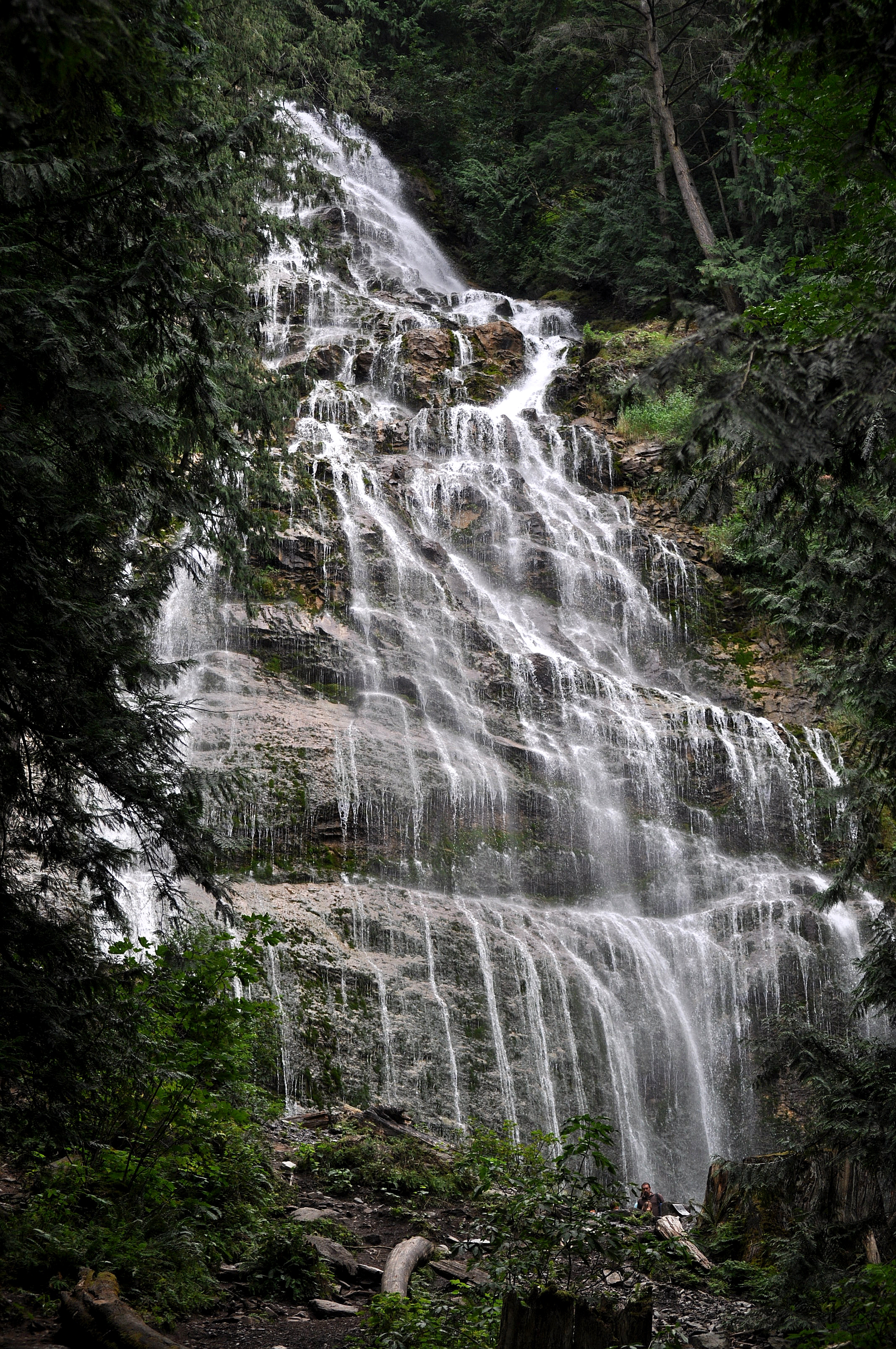
- Interactive map of Bridal Veil Falls
- Location: Chilliwack, British Columbia, Canada
- Type: Segmented tiered
- Total height: 122 metres (400.26 ft)
- Number of drops: 1
- Average width: 23 metres (75.46 ft)
- Watercourse: Bridal Creek

Bridal Veil Falls Provincial Park is a BC Park situated on the Trans-Canada Highway just east of Rosedale, British Columbia, Canada, within of the City of Chilliwack. The community of Bridal Falls is located adjacent to the falls and park, as well as the interchange between the Trans-Canada and BC Highway 9, offering a variety of highway-based tourism services. Access to the falls requires a short hike from the parking lot and well-groomed trails, taking most groups 15-25 minutes.

== History ==
Bridal Veil Falls was named in the 19th century by the village of Popkum. In the early 20th century, the village used the waterfall with a hydro-electric generator to power the chalet and heated swimming pool in the village. Only the concrete foundation of the generator can be found today.

== Appearance ==
This Park is named after the waterfall that it encompasses, Bridal Veil Falls, which is the 38th highest waterfall in British Columbia. However, it is commonly misstated as the 4th tallest in Canada. The falls drop 122 metres (400 feet) over a wide rock face, creating a "veil-like" effect.

Unfortunately, only the bottom 200–250 feet can clearly be viewed from the base due to the viewing-points' location directly at the base. It is located at the south end of the land set aside as provincial Park. Their source is Mount Archibald, and they flow into Bridal Creek, which then travels to Cheam Lake Wetlands Regional Park and finally to the Fraser River.

=== Summer ===
During drier summer months, the volume of the water decreases significantly, reducing the visual impact of the waterfall.

=== Winter ===
Bridal Veil Falls tend to freeze during cold winters, creating a wall of ice that is often unstable. Consequently, the base of the falls becomes an extremely hazardous area, leading to the closure of the park during the winter season. While the falls are frozen solid, they become a sought-after destination for ice climb. However, climbers recognize the difficulty of climbing in these conditions and the infrequency of stable climbing conditions.

== See also ==
- List of waterfalls
- List of waterfalls of Canada
- List of waterfalls in British Columbia
