= Bridal Falls, British Columbia =

Coordinates: 49°11′00″N 121°44′00″W

Bridal Falls
- Neighbourhood in Chilliwack
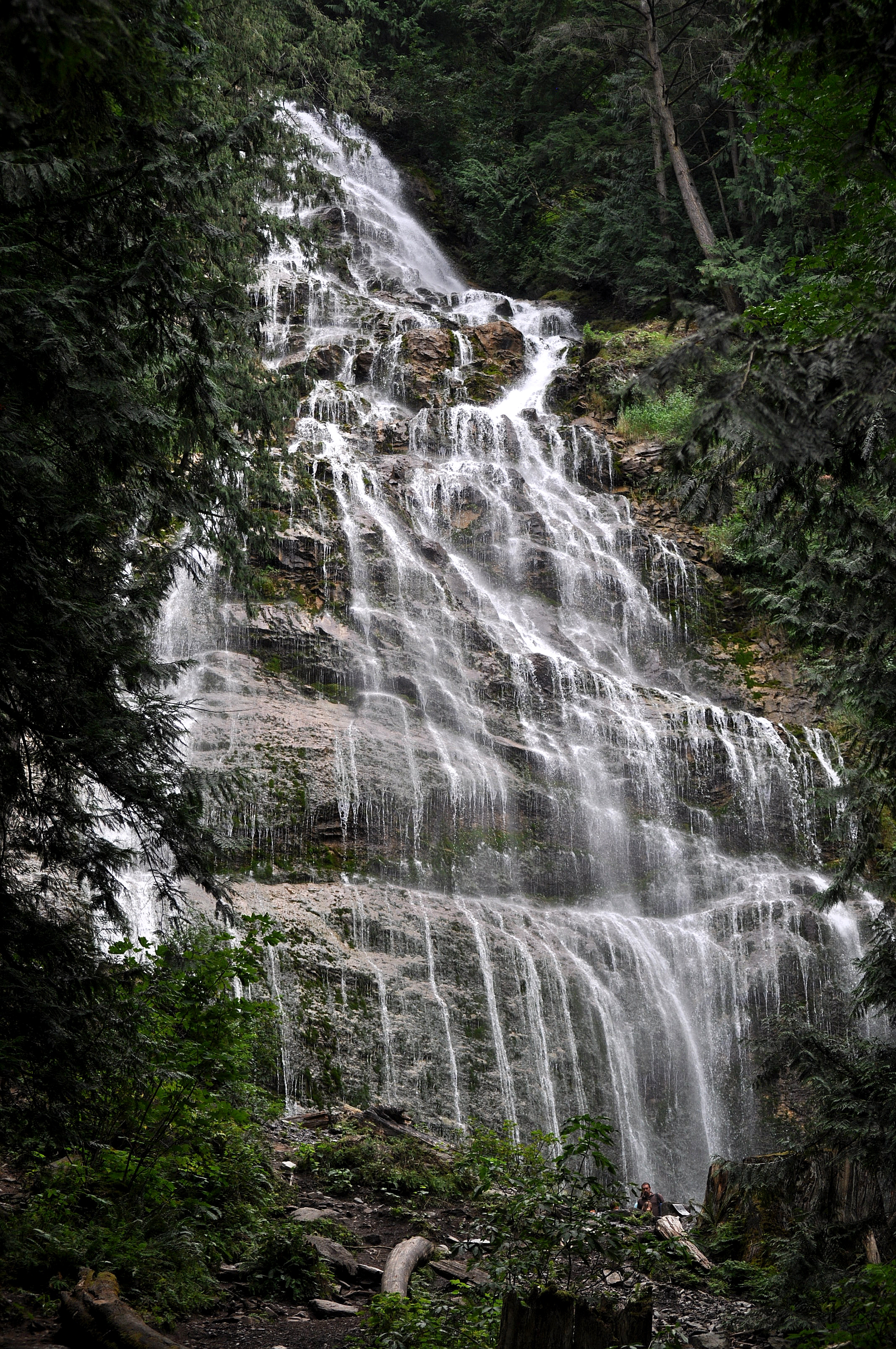
- Bridal Falls
- Interactive map of Bridal Falls
- Country: Canada
- Province: British Columbia
- City: Chilliwack
- Time zone: UTC−07:00 (PT)
- Postal code: V2P
- Area code: +1-604

Bridal Falls is a community in the Fraser Valley of British Columbia, located east of Rosedale and immediately adjacent to the on-ramps for the Agassiz-Rosedale Bridge, which connects the Trans-Canada Highway (Highway 1) at Bridal Falls to Agassiz, on Highway 9.

Bridal Falls is mostly a highway services community, with several truck stops and restaurants. The town's name is derived from Bridal Veil Falls, which was the original rationale for tourist services at the location and at one time included cabins that were promoted as a honeymoon holiday, playing off the bridal theme of the name.

The falls were named in the 19th century by the village of Popkum, which in the 20th century used it for a source of hydroelectricity for a chalet and heated swimming pool. Later tourist attractions in the area were a Flintstones-themed waterpark and similar family entertainments.
