= Tusayan, Arizona =

Community in Coconino County, Arizona

- Town
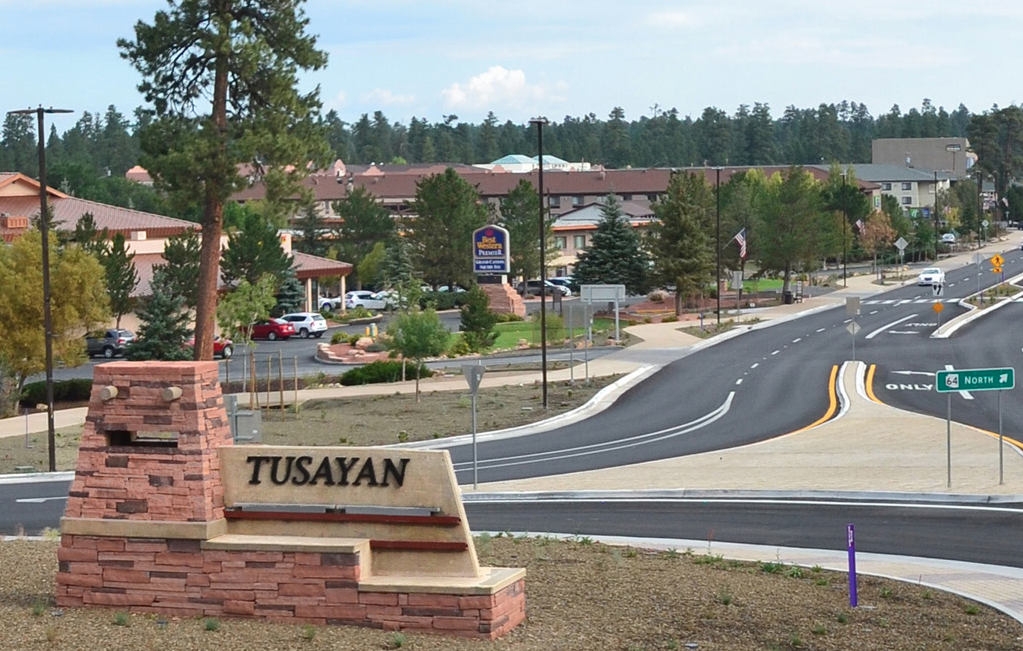
- The Tusayan welcome sign with town behind

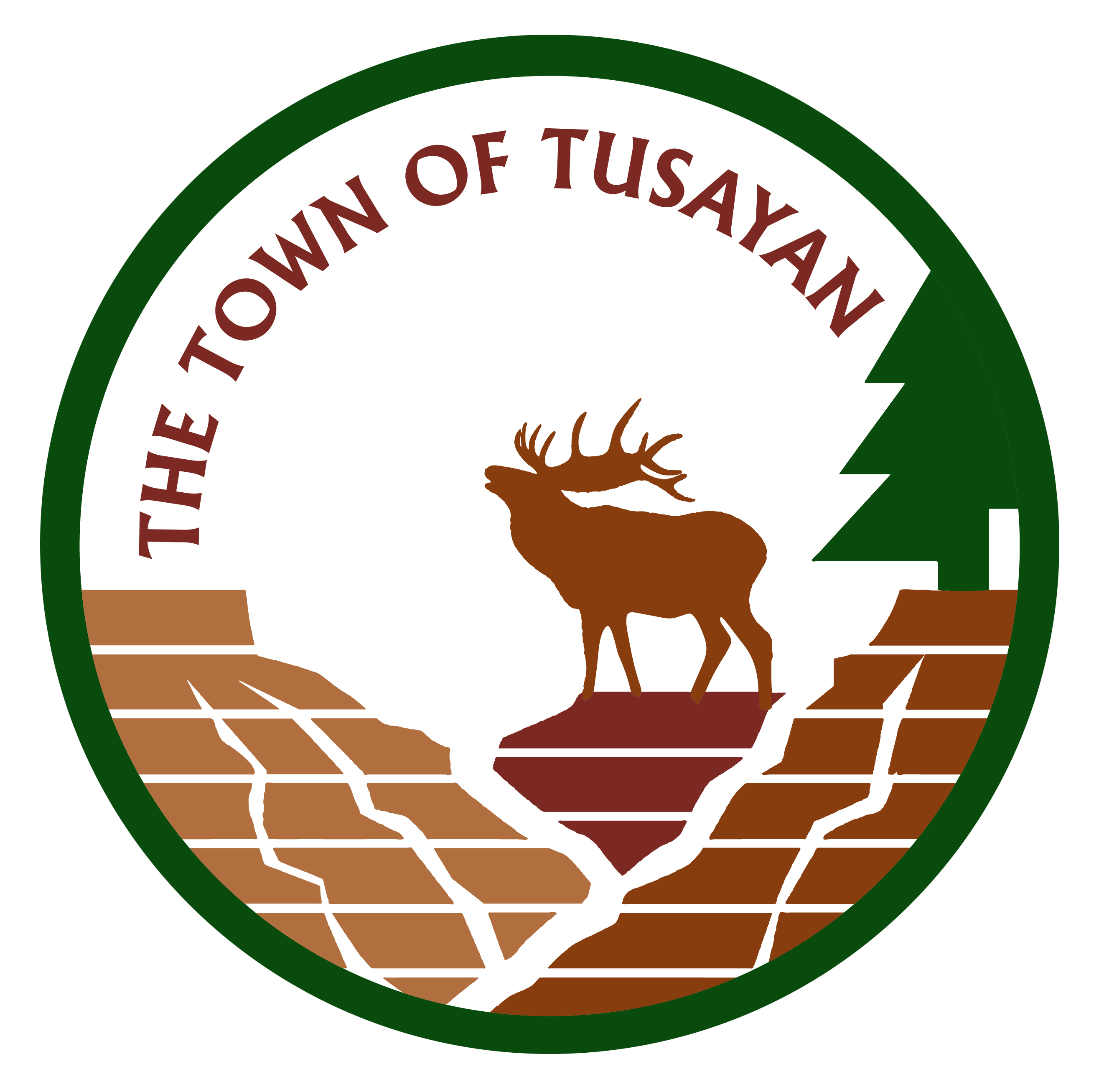
- Flag Seal

- Location of Tusayan in Coconino County, Arizona.

- Location in the United States
- Coordinates: 35°57′25″N 112°07′48″W
- Country: United States
- State: Arizona
- County: Coconino
- Incorporated: 2010

Government
  - Mayor: Clarinda Vail

Area
  - Total: 16.83 sq mi (43.58 km^{2})
  - Land: 16.83 sq mi (43.58 km^{2})
  - Water: 0 sq mi (0.00 km^{2})
- Elevation: 6,746 ft (2,056 m)

Population (2020)
  - Total: 603
  - Density: 35.8/sq mi (13.84/km^{2})
- Time zone: UTC−7 (MST)
- ZIP code: 86023
- Area code: 928
- FIPS code: 04-77490
- GNIS feature ID: 2663676
- Website: Town of Tusayan

Tusayan is a town located in Coconino County, Arizona, United States. It was incorporated in 2010. It is a resort town near the south entrance to Grand Canyon National Park, acting as a gateway community. As of the 2020 census, Tusayan had a population of 603.

== History ==
The community first explored incorporation in the early 1990s. Legislation passed to allow it, but was challenged and defeated as unconstitutional because it applied only to Tusayan. In 2003, new legislation was passed allowing any community of 500 or more to incorporate if located in proximity to a national park or monument. The Tusayan-Grand Canyon Chamber of Commerce appointed a task force of who studied the issue for four years. In June 2007, they made a neutral presentation to the community, offering revenue projections and an overview of pros and cons. In April 2008, about 30 voters signed a petition to put the question of incorporation on the September 2, 2008, ballot. The measure was defeated by a vote of 78 to 62.

Another vote, held on March 9, 2010, proved more successful when the measure was approved by a margin of 116 to 71, making Tusayan the 91st incorporated place in the state of Arizona. An interim town council appointed by the Coconino County Board of Supervisors held the town's first council meeting on April 7.

== Geography ==
As an incorporated town, Tusayan has a land area of only 144 acres (58 ha), or 0.225 square miles (0.58 km^{2}), making it the smallest town in Arizona by area.

According to the United States Census Bureau, the census-designated place (CDP) in 2000 had a total area of 28.6 square miles (74 km^{2}), of which 28.6 square miles (74 km^{2}) is land and 0.04% is water.

=== Climate ===
Under the Köppen climate classification, Tusayan has either a warm-summer Mediterranean climate (Csb) or a dry-summer continental climate (Dsb), depending on which variant of the system is used. Summer days are hot while nights are refreshingly cool. Wintertime is generally cold, with highs in the 40's and lows in the teens. Diurnal temperature range is very high year-round in Tusayan, but even more so during summer, with an average June day being a high of 82 degrees and low of 40 degrees.

Climate data for Grand Canyon National Park Airport, AZ
Month	Jan	Feb	Mar	Apr	May	Jun	Jul	Aug	Sep	Oct	Nov	Dec	Year
Record high °F (°C)	70 (21)	66 (19)	75 (24)	81 (27)	91 (33)	97 (36)	99 (37)	94 (34)	88 (31)	85 (29)	74 (23)	66 (19)	99 (37)
Mean daily maximum °F (°C)	44.6 (7.0)	45.9 (7.7)	54.2 (12.3)	60.7 (15.9)	72.1 (22.3)	82.6 (28.1)	85.8 (29.9)	82.7 (28.2)	76.4 (24.7)	64.7 (18.2)	54.0 (12.2)	43.8 (6.6)	64.0 (17.8)
Mean daily minimum °F (°C)	13.7 (−10.2)	16.0 (−8.9)	19.9 (−6.7)	24.3 (−4.3)	30.4 (−0.9)	36.8 (2.7)	48.8 (9.3)	48.1 (8.9)	39.8 (4.3)	28.3 (−2.1)	19.9 (−6.7)	12.8 (−10.7)	28.2 (−2.1)
Record low °F (°C)	−29 (−34)	−17 (−27)	−8 (−22)	3 (−16)	11 (−12)	21 (−6)	28 (−2)	29 (−2)	21 (−6)	6 (−14)	−8 (−22)	−30 (−34)	−30 (−34)
Average precipitation inches (mm)	0.97 (25)	0.98 (25)	0.96 (24)	0.88 (22)	0.37 (9.4)	0.28 (7.1)	2.23 (57)	2.23 (57)	1.48 (38)	1.45 (37)	0.71 (18)	0.83 (21)	13.37 (340.5)
Average precipitation days (≥ 0.01 in)	6	7	6	6	3	2	12	12	7	5	4	6	76
Source: https://w2.weather.gov/climate/xmacis.php?wfo=fgz

== Demographics ==
Historical population
Census	Pop.	Note	%±
2000	562		—
2010	558		−0.7%
2020	603		8.1%
U.S. Decennial Census

As of the census of 2000, there were 562 people, 222 households, and 101 families residing in the CDP. The population density was 19.7 inhabitants per square mile (7.6/km^{2}). There were 313 housing units at an average density of 11.0 per square mile (4.2/km^{2}). The racial makeup of the CDP was 69.2% White, 15.8% Native American, 1.1% Black or African American, 11.6% from other races, and 2.3% from two or more races. 30.3% of the population were Hispanic or Latino of any race.

There were 222 households, out of which 27.0% had children under the age of 18 living with them, 30.2% were married couples living together, 9.0% had a female householder with no husband present, and 54.1% were non-families. 32.9% of all households were made up of individuals, and 1.8% had someone living alone who was 65 years of age or older. The average household size was 2.37 and the average family size was 3.38.

In the CDP, the age distribution of the population shows 25.4% under the age of 18, 15.5% from 18 to 24, 36.5% from 25 to 44, 20.1% from 45 to 64, and 2.5% who were 65 years of age or older. The median age was 31 years. For every 100 females, there were 128.5 males. For every 100 females age 18 and over, there were 125.3 males.

The median income for a household in the CDP was $34,917, and the median income for a family was $45,625. Males had a median income of $28,125 versus $21,250 for females. The per capita income for the CDP was $16,637. About 14.9% of families and 18.2% of the population were below the poverty line, including 18.0% of those under age 18 and none of those age 65 or over.

== Economy ==
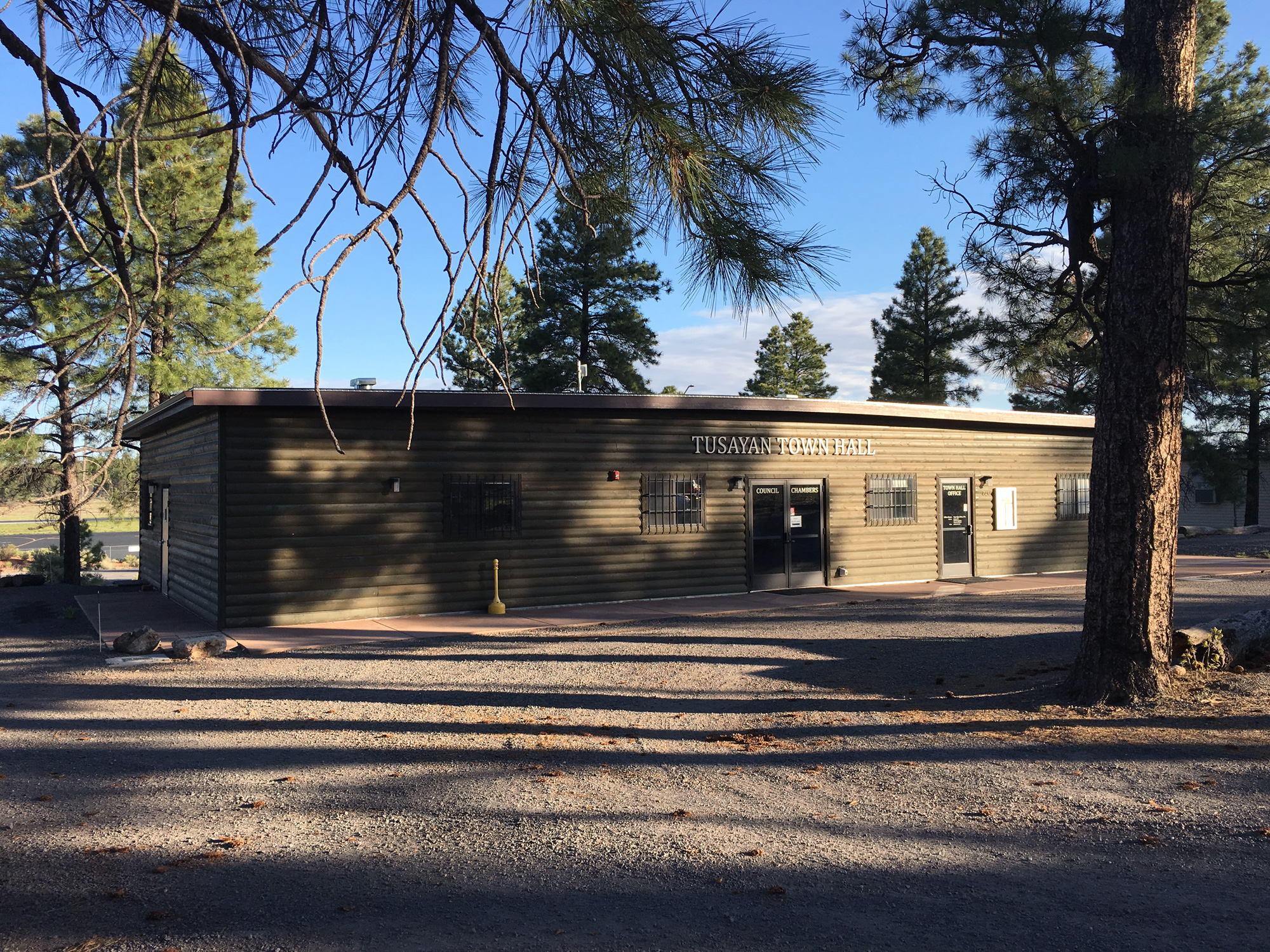
Town Hall

Tusayan is approximately one mile from the south entrance to Grand Canyon National Park. The town's businesses mainly serve tourists visiting the park although some local residents have shown interest in making the town itself a tourist destination. Hotels in Tusayan have approx 1,100 rooms (more than GCNP).

== Education ==
The majority is within the Grand Canyon Unified School District, while a sliver is in the Williams Unified School District.

The high school of the former is Grand Canyon High School.

== Infrastructure ==
=== Transportation ===
Grand Canyon National Park Airport is in Tusayan.

Arizona State Route 64, coming from Williams and U. S. Route 180, coming from Flagstaff serve Tusayan. They share a four-lane highway through town, which becomes two lanes outside the business district. The route designations then split south of town at Valle.

== See also ==
- Kaibab National Forest
