= Valle Airport =

Airport in Coconino County, Arizona

Coordinates: 35.6495193°N 112.1419097°W

- IATA: VLE; ICAO: none; FAA LID: 40G

Summary
- Airport type: Private- Closed
- Owner/Operator: Grand Canyon Valle Corp.
- Serves: Valle, Arizona
- Elevation AMSL: 5,999 ft / 1,828.5 m

Map

Runways
Direction	Length		Surface
Direction	ft	m	Surface
1/19	4,199	1,280	Asphalt
- Source: Federal Aviation Administration

Valle Airport (IATA: VLE, FAA LID: 40G) is a private airport located 29 miles (25 nmi; 47 km) north of Williams, Arizona, United States. The airport is permanently closed to the public. Valle is the second location of Planes of Fame Air Museum.

== History ==
The airport was purchased by John Seibold, founder of Scenic Airlines, in 1972.

== Planes of Fame museum ==
The Valle branch of Planes of Fame opened in 1995 because the Chino collection had grown so greatly an additional facility was needed. This branch of the museum is permanently closed to the public. 40 of the museum's 150 aircraft are kept in Valle, many of which are flyable. A Pacific Airlines Martin 404 and a Western Airlines Convair 240 are displayed alongside Arizona highway 64 30 miles south of Grand Canyon National Park.

== Facilities and aircraft ==
Valle Airport covers an area of 330 acres (130 ha) at an elevation of 5,999 feet (1,828 m) above mean sea level. It has one runway:

- 1/19 measuring 4,199 x 45 feet (1,280 x 14 m) with an asphalt surface

For the 12-month period ending April 20, 2009, the airport had 6,500 general aviation aircraft operations, an average of 18 per day. At that time there were six aircraft based at this airport, all single-engine.

== Historical airline service ==
Trans World Airlines (TWA) served Grand Canyon National Park via the Valle Airport during the late 1940s and early 1950s. According to a Trans World timetable which appeared in the October 1948 Official Airline Guide, Valle was a stop on transcontinental flights operated by TWA with routings of Philadelphia – Pittsburgh – Chicago – Kansas City – Wichita – Amarillo – Albuquerque – Winslow, AZ – Grand Canyon (Valle Airport) – Boulder City, NV – Las Vegas, NV – Los Angeles and also Baltimore – Washington, D.C. – Columbus, OH – Dayton, OH – Indianapolis – St. Louis – Kansas City – Topeka, KS – Wichita, KS – Amarillo – Santa Fe, NM – Winslow, AZ – Grand Canyon (Valle Airport) – Las Vegas, NV – Los Angeles. According to the Sept. 19, 1951 Trans World Airlines system timetable, TWA was continuing to serve the airport at this time with two daily flights both operated with Douglas DC-3 aircraft including a westbound service flying a routing of Amarillo - Albuquerque - Winslow, AZ - Grand Canyon (Valle Airport) - Las Vegas, NV - Los Angeles - Fresno, CA - Oakland - San Francisco and an eastbound service flying a routing of Los Angeles - Las Vegas, NV - Grand Canyon (Valle Airport) - Winslow, AZ - Santa Fe, NM - Amarillo with both of these flights offering connections via either Albuquerque or Amarillo to and from TWA flights serving the U.S. midwest and eastern U.S. However, according to the Dec. 1, 1953 Trans World Airlines system timetable, TWA had ceased all scheduled passenger flights into Valle Airport by this time.

== See also ==
- List of airports in Arizona
