= Cheam Lake wetlands =

Wetlands in British Columbia, Canada

Cheam Lake Wetlands is a regional park located in the Fraser Valley in British Columbia, Canada.

The wetlands are noted for their wildlife, with over 200 species of birds nesting in the park.
