= Bedrock City (Arizona) =

Roadside attraction in the United States

Coordinates: 35°39′15″N 112°08′24″W

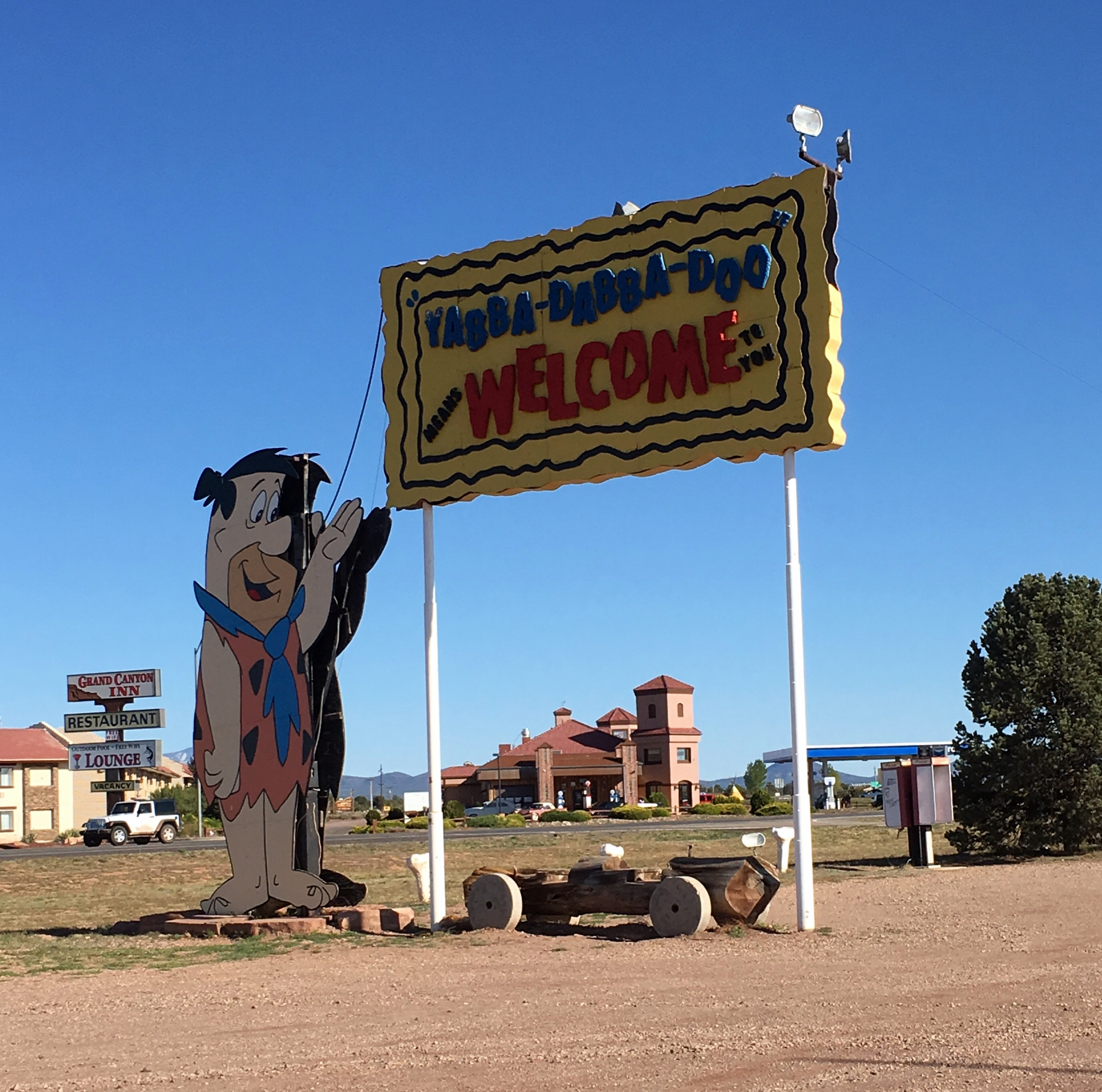
Entrance to the park

Bedrock City is a Flintstones-themed roadside attraction consisting of an amusement park and RV park at the corner of Arizona State Route 64 and U.S. Route 180 in Valle, Coconino County, in the U.S. state of Arizona. The park was opened in 1972, following the owners' success with a predecessor park near Mount Rushmore in South Dakota. The park licenses the likenesses of the Flintstones characters, and features statues, rides, and a diner based on that theme.

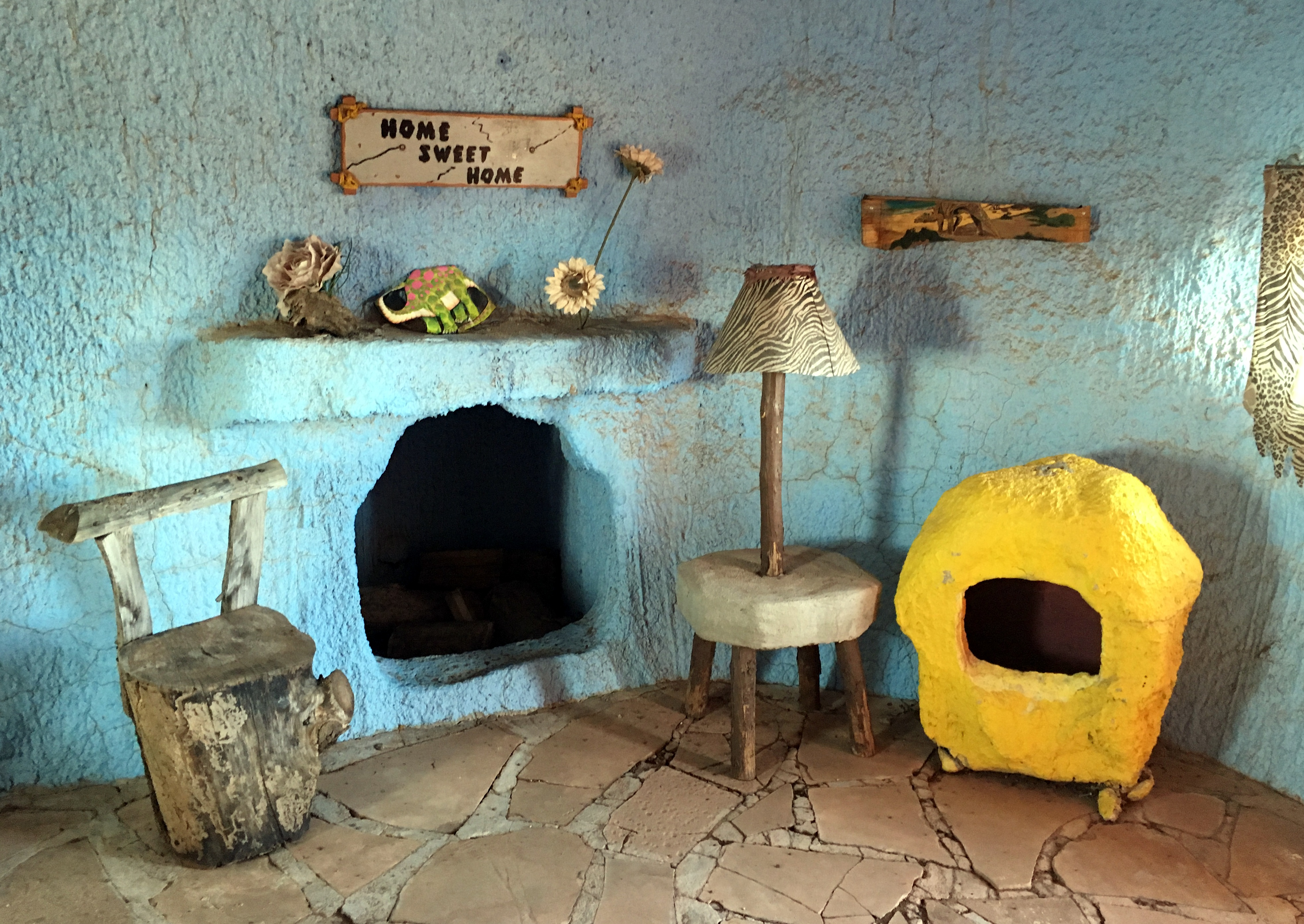
Interior of Barney Rubble's house

In 2015, the park's owner, Linda Speckles, was planning to retire and sell the park for $2 million US. The park was closed on January 28, 2019, but reopened in mid-June and remained open through the end of Summer 2019. As of the location's 50th anniversary in 2022, it has been incorporated as part of the Raptor Ranch conservation park, with plans to remain open "indefinitely."
