= Red Lake, Arizona =

CDP in Coconino County, Arizona

- Census-designated place
- Red Lake in 2022

- Location within Arizona Location within the United States
- Coordinates: 35°22′3″N 112°09′23″W
- Country: United States
- State: Arizona
- County: Coconino

Area
  - Total: 29.96 sq mi (77.60 km^{2})
  - Land: 29.95 sq mi (77.56 km^{2})
  - Water: 0.015 sq mi (0.04 km^{2})
- Elevation: 6,555 ft (1,998 m)

Population (2020)
  - Total: 1,680
  - Density: 56.1/sq mi (21.66/km^{2})
- Time zone: UTC-7 (MST)
  - Summer (DST): UTC-6 (MDT)
- ZIP Codes: 86046 (Williams)
- FIPS code: 04-59372
- GNIS feature ID: 2805225

Red Lake is an unincorporated community and census-designated place (CDP) in Coconino County, Arizona, United States. It is bordered to the south by the city of Williams. It was first listed as a CDP prior to the 2020 census.

== Demographics ==
Historical population
Census	Pop.	Note	%±
2020	1,680		—
U.S. Decennial Census

=== 2020 census ===
As of the 2020 census, the median age was 55.6 years. 15.9% of residents were under the age of 18 and 29.0% of residents were 65 years of age or older. For every 100 females there were 107.2 males, and for every 100 females age 18 and over there were 106.3 males age 18 and over.

0.0% of residents lived in urban areas, while 100.0% lived in rural areas.

There were 704 households in Red Lake, of which 20.2% had children under the age of 18 living in them. Of all households, 56.8% were married-couple households, 24.1% were households with a male householder and no spouse or partner present, and 14.3% were households with a female householder and no spouse or partner present. About 29.2% of all households were made up of individuals and 12.9% had someone living alone who was 65 years of age or older.

There were 991 housing units, of which 29.0% were vacant. The homeowner vacancy rate was 2.5% and the rental vacancy rate was 11.5%.

Racial composition as of the 2020 census
Race	Number	Percent
White	1,374	81.8%
Black or African American	16	1.0%
American Indian and Alaska Native	40	2.4%
Asian	11	0.7%
Native Hawaiian and Other Pacific Islander	2	0.1%
Some other race	61	3.6%
Two or more races	176	10.5%
Hispanic or Latino (of any race)	241	14.3%
