= Bedrock City (South Dakota) =

Former theme park and campground

Coordinates: 43.761316°N 103.613616°W

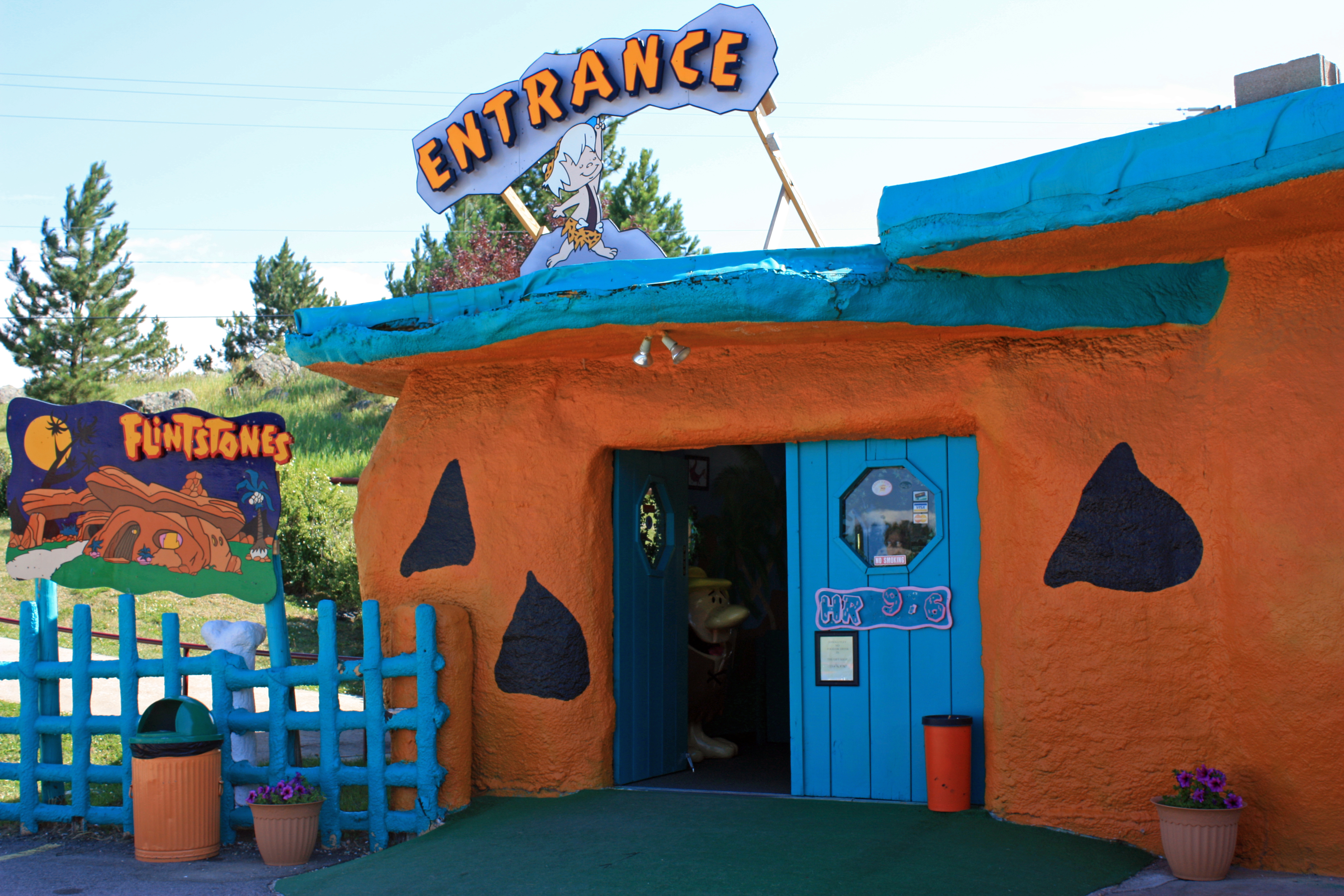
Entrance to Bedrock City

Flintstones Bedrock City was a 62 acres (25 ha) theme park and campground in Custer, South Dakota in the Black Hills which featured buildings and characters inspired by The Flintstones television series. The facility opened in 1966 and closed in 2015.

The campground was reopened as Buffalo Ridge Campground Resort. As of July 2019, all the Flintstones items have been taken down and more camping sites added. They are planning ten tree houses in 2020 and are also currently rebuilding the pool.

The sister location in Arizona was put up for sale in 2015, but the new owners retained the exhibit.

== Description ==
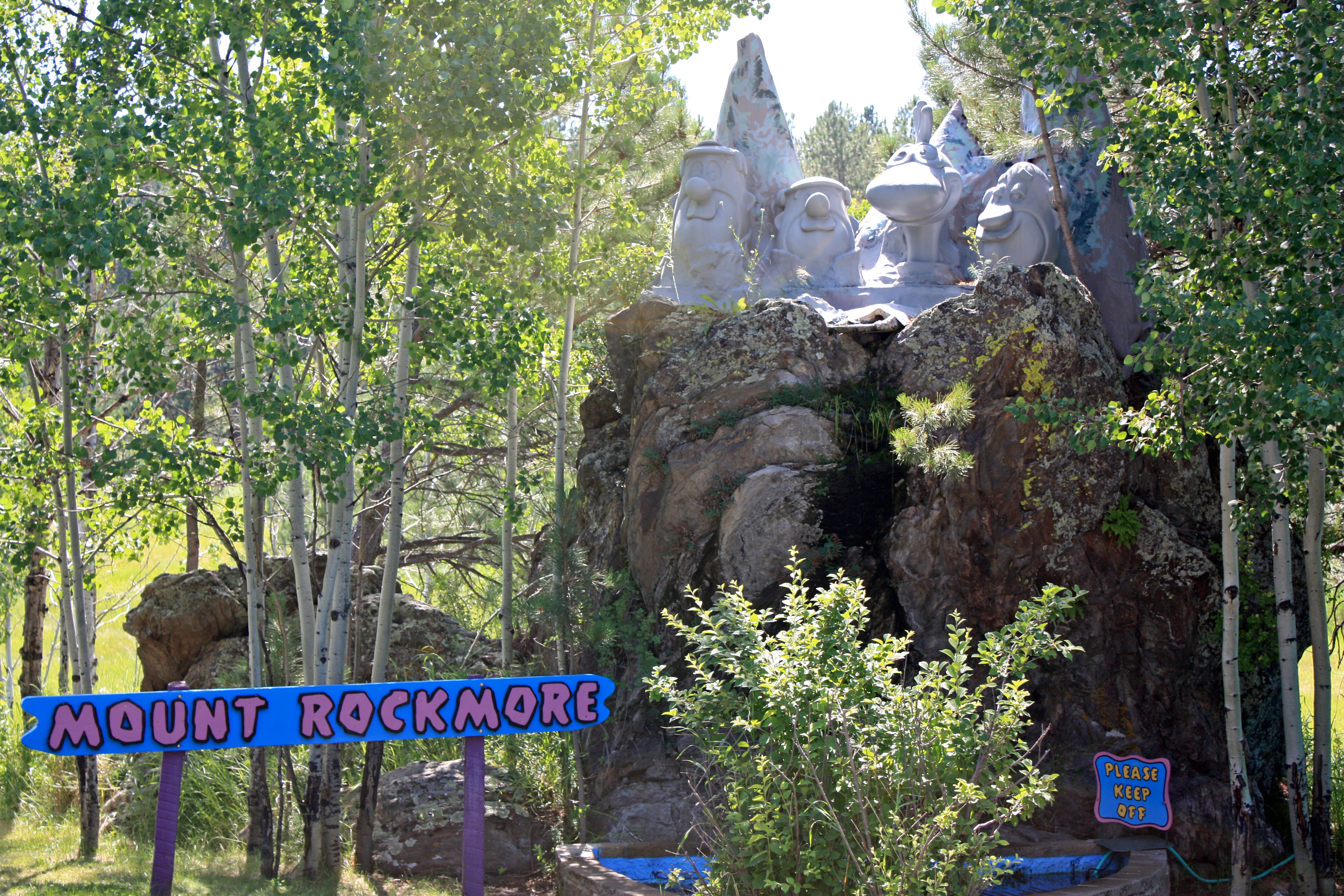
Mount Rockmore

=== Amusement Area ===
The park's entrance included a large gift shop, a drive-in restaurant which featured "Brontoburgers", and a 20 feet (6.1 m) tall statue of Dino overlooking the entrance. After entering the park, visitors could ride an 1880s miniature train that took guests to a western façade, through Dinosaur Canyon, around the park and returned to the depot after passing through a volcano called Mt. St. Wilma. Bedrock's City Hall welcomed visitors to the prehistoric town which included the homes of the Flintstones, the Rubbles, Mr. Slate, and Mr. Granitebilt. Other features included a working movie cinema, playhouse theatre (featuring a show by the Flintstone Trio: Fred, Wilma, and Dino), radio station, telephone company, grocery store, police department, dentist's office, beauty parlor, stone scraper, fire department, Water Buffalo lodge, auto garage, and bank buildings. Interiors were decorated in the style of the show and featured sculpted and animated characters going about their daily lives in Bedrock. A feature at one end of Main Street was Mount Rockmore, a replica of nearby Mount Rushmore with the heads of Fred, Barney, Dino, and Mr. Granitebilt carved into a hill. The park also had a large playground with multiple unique activities.

=== Campground ===
The campground was tucked away behind the park and included a swimming pool, laundry/arcade, grocery store, putt-putt golf, playground, bathhouses, camping cabins and many campsites.
