= Valle, Arizona =

Census-designated place in Arizona, US

- Location of Valle in Coconino County, Arizona.

- Location in the United States
- Coordinates: 35°37′28″N 112°08′06″W
- Country: United States
- State: Arizona
- Counties: Coconino

Area
  - Total: 372.00 sq mi (963.47 km^{2})
  - Land: 371.98 sq mi (963.43 km^{2})
  - Water: 0.015 sq mi (0.04 km^{2})
- Elevation: 5,942 ft (1,811 m)

Population (2020)
  - Total: 759
  - Density: 2.0/sq mi (0.79/km^{2})
- Time zone: UTC-7 (MST)
- FIPS code: 04-78855
- GNIS feature ID: 2582888

Valle is a census-designated place in Coconino County, Arizona, United States. As of the 2020 US Census the population of Valle was 759. It lies at an altitude of 5,994 feet (1,827 m), at the junction of U.S. Route 180 and State Route 64. Its attractions include the Valle Airport (40G), the Planes of Fame Air Museum, and Birds of Prey, formally Bedrock City (Arizona), amusement park. Drivers often stop at the town on their way to the Grand Canyon from either Williams or Flagstaff, as it is approximately at the halfway point.

== Description ==
Valle is not shown on the Rand McNally Road Atlas annual series. The town sits to the west of the highway intersections, with some streets to the east of US 180. The area is subdivided by roads for a planned community in which 1-acre (4,000 m^{2}) lots were sold during the early 1960s. These roads are all dirt with the exception of the two main highways (US 180 and AZ 64). With the exception of a few property owners who have set up camp on their land, the area has not been developed.

== Demographics ==
Historical population
Census	Pop.	Note	%±
2010	832		—
2020	759		−8.8%
U.S. Decennial Census

== Education ==
Most of Valle is in the Williams Unified School District. A portion is in the Grand Canyon Unified School District. The latter operates Grand Canyon High School.

== Attractions in Valle ==
=== Planes of Fame Museum ===
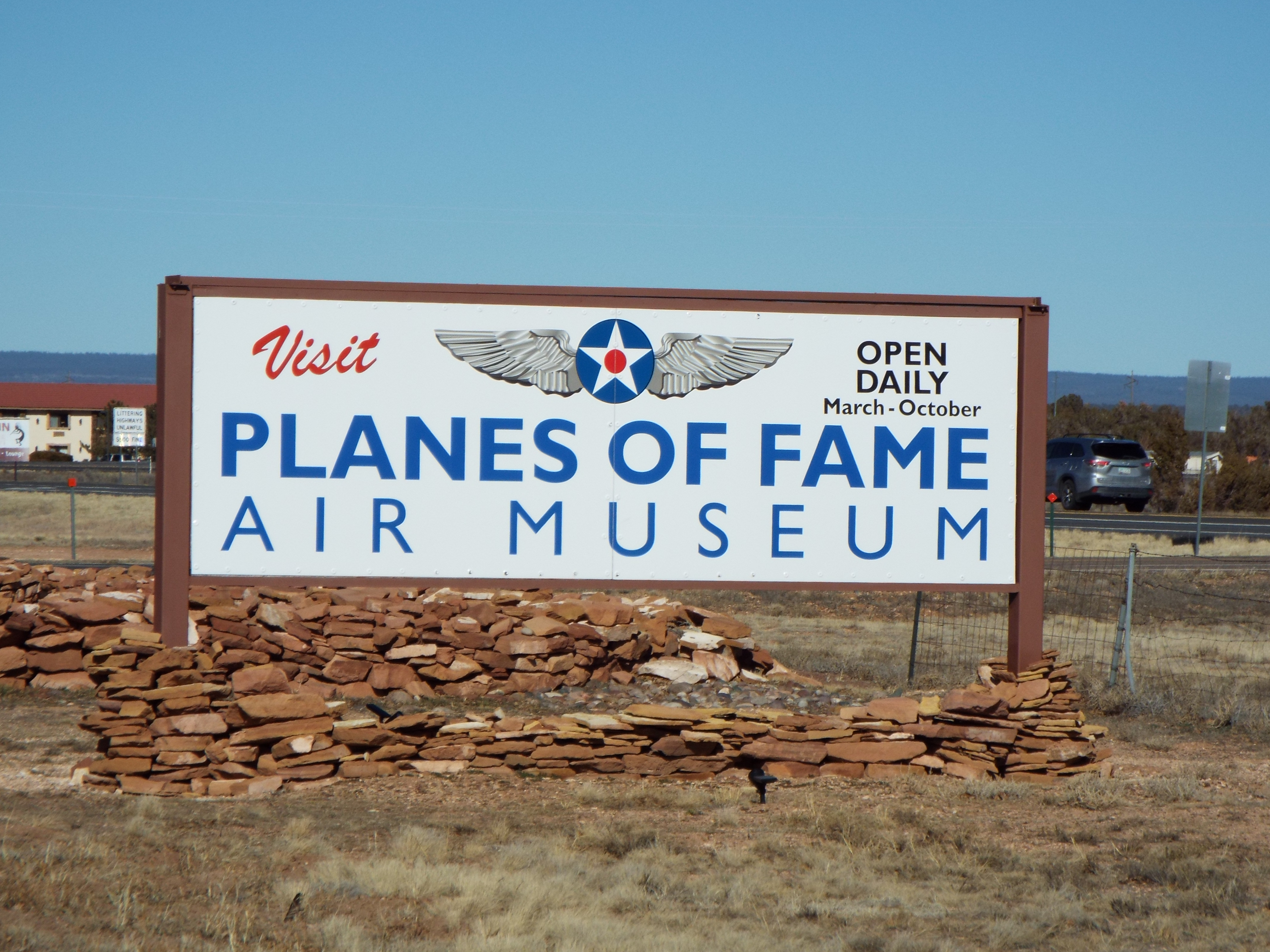

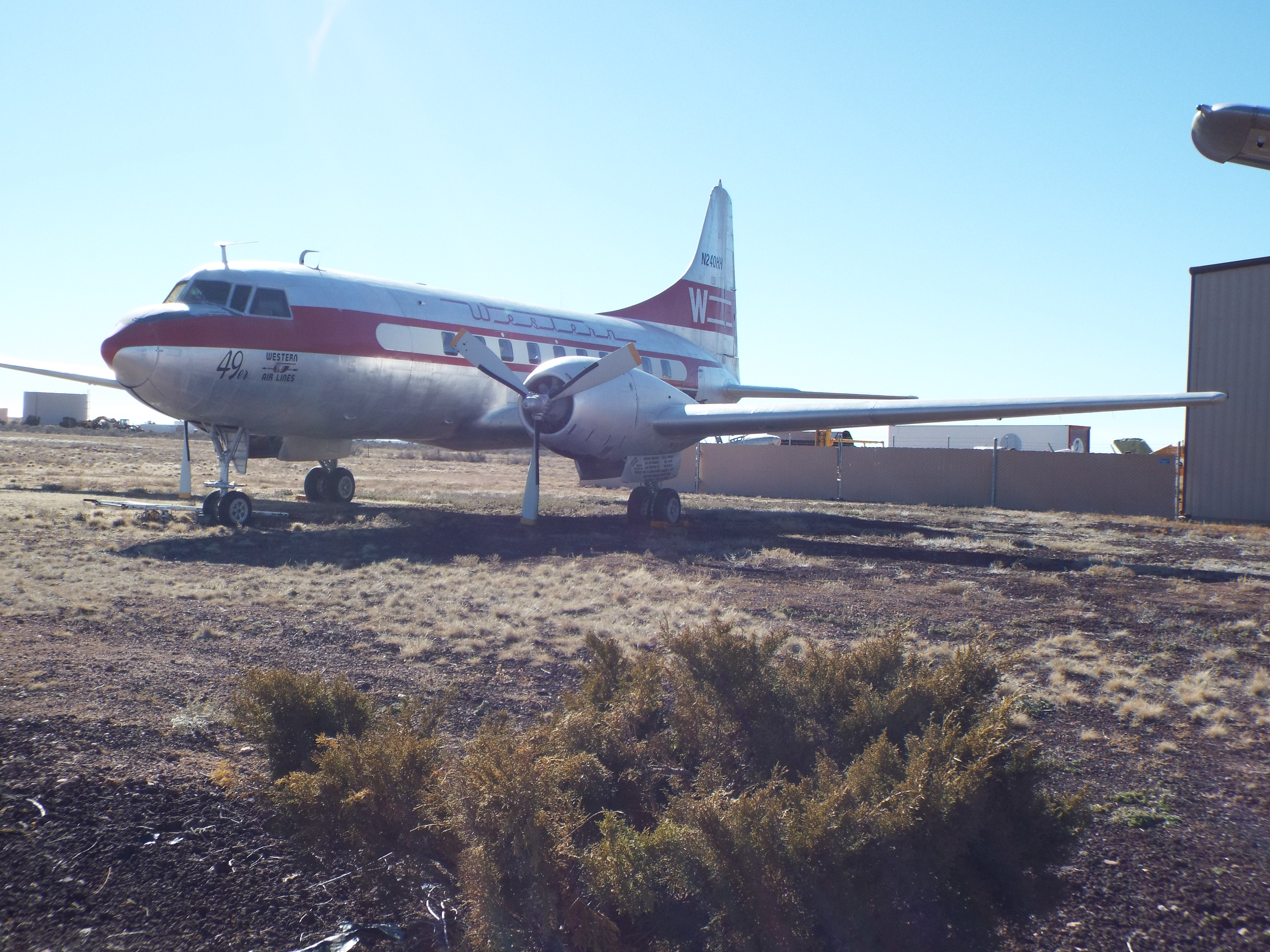
Convair 240 in Western Airlines livery

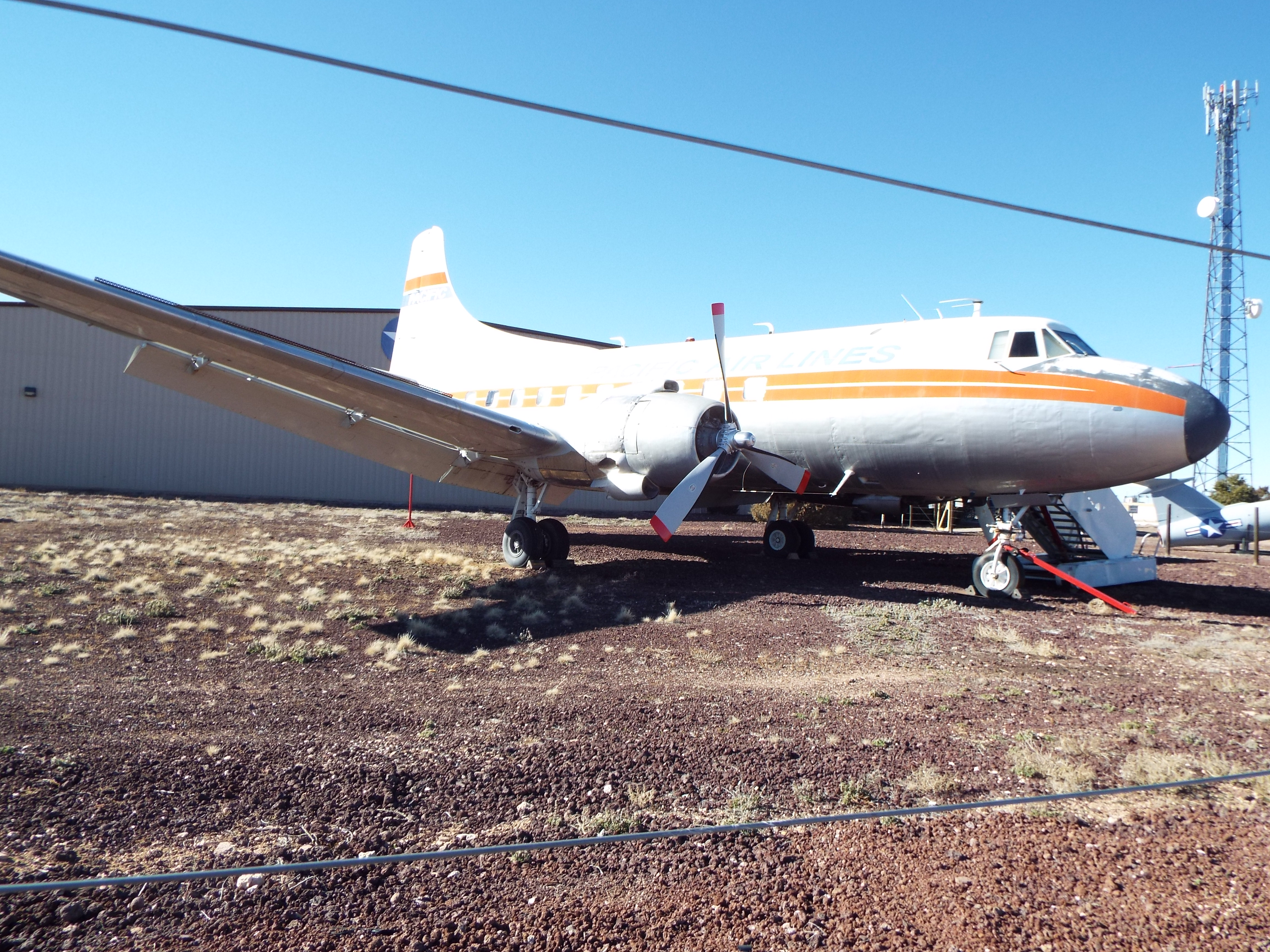
Martin 4-0-4

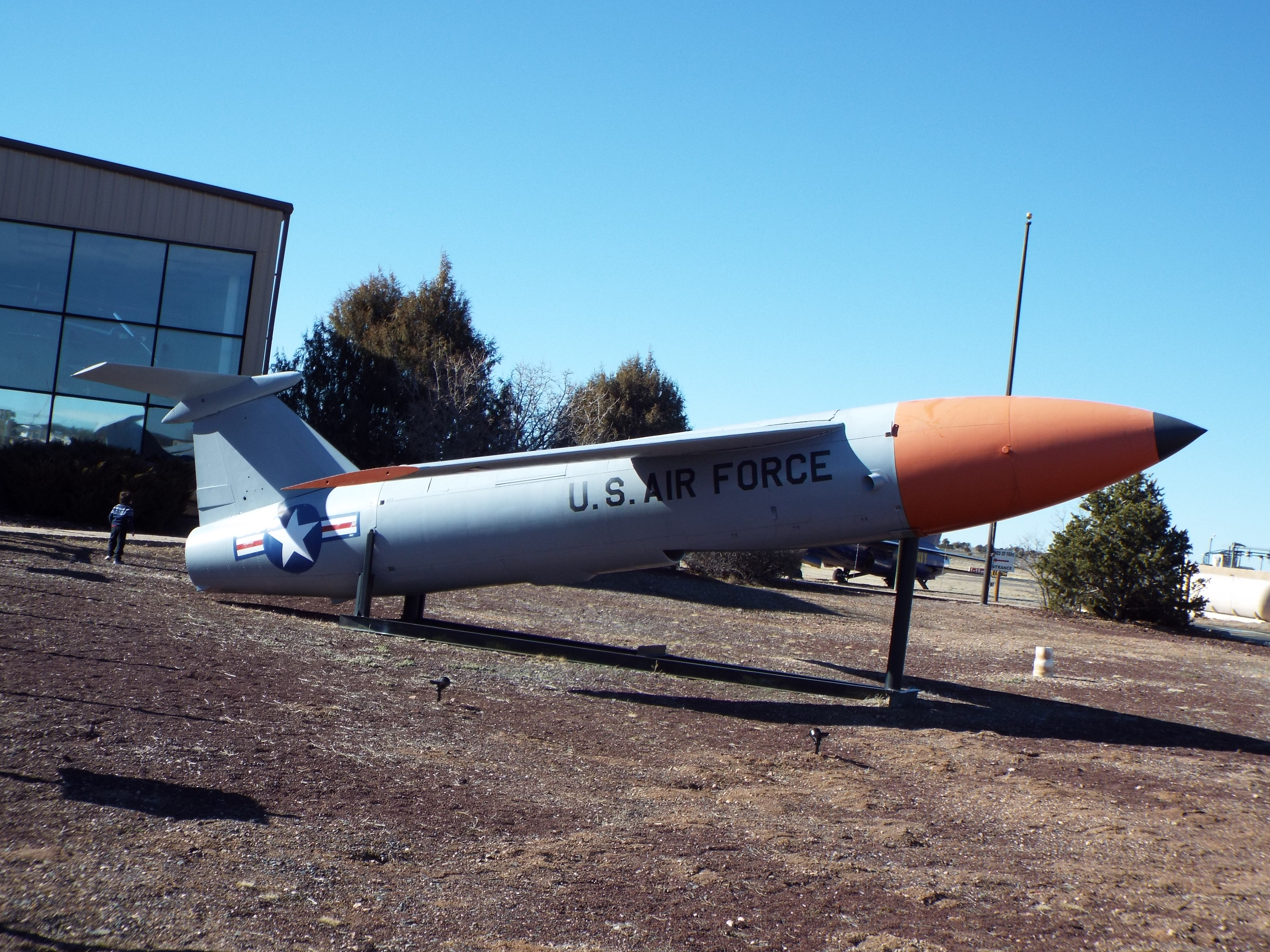
TM-61C Matador

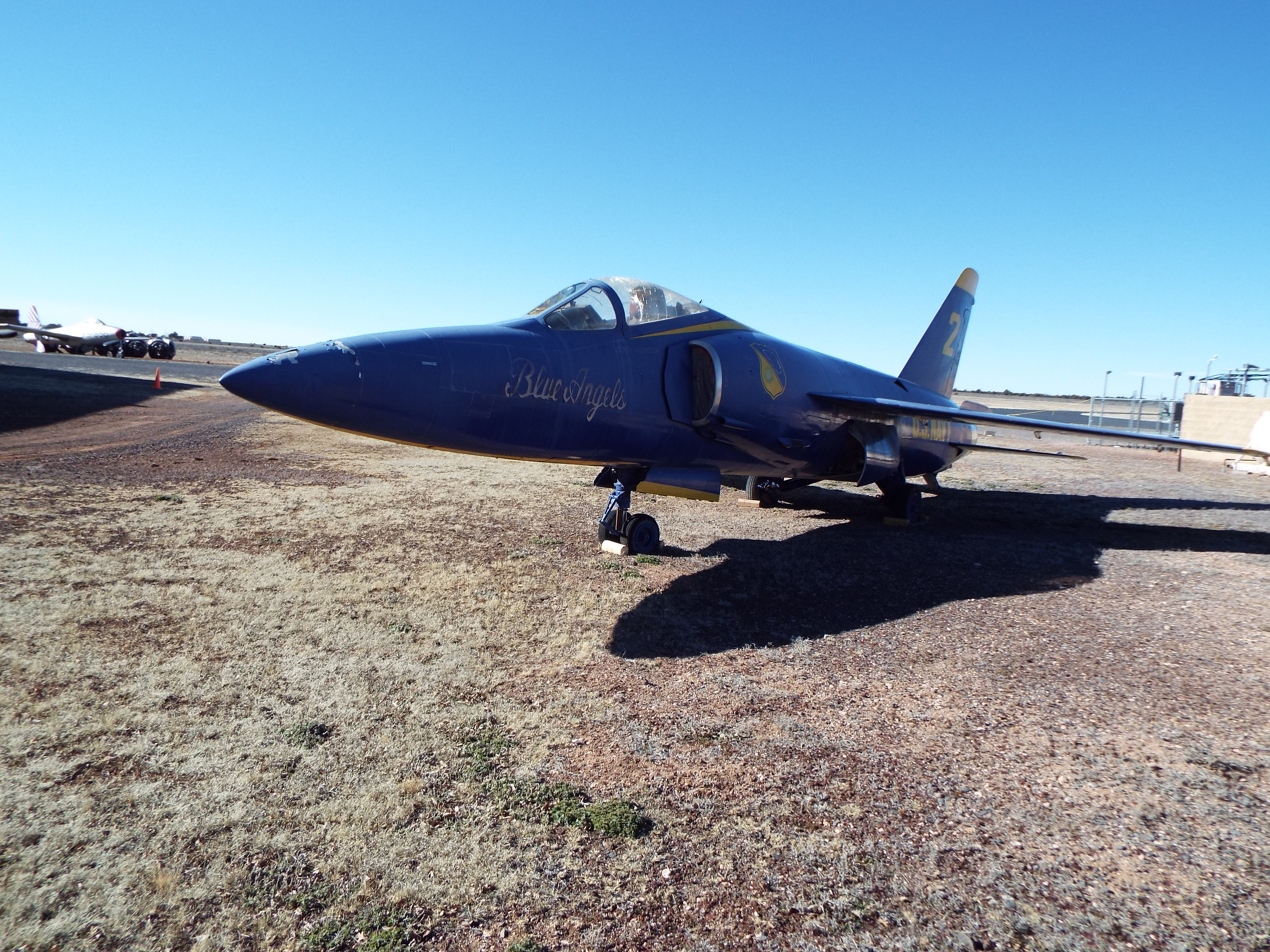
Blue Angel Grumman F11F-1 Tiger

=== Bedrock City ===
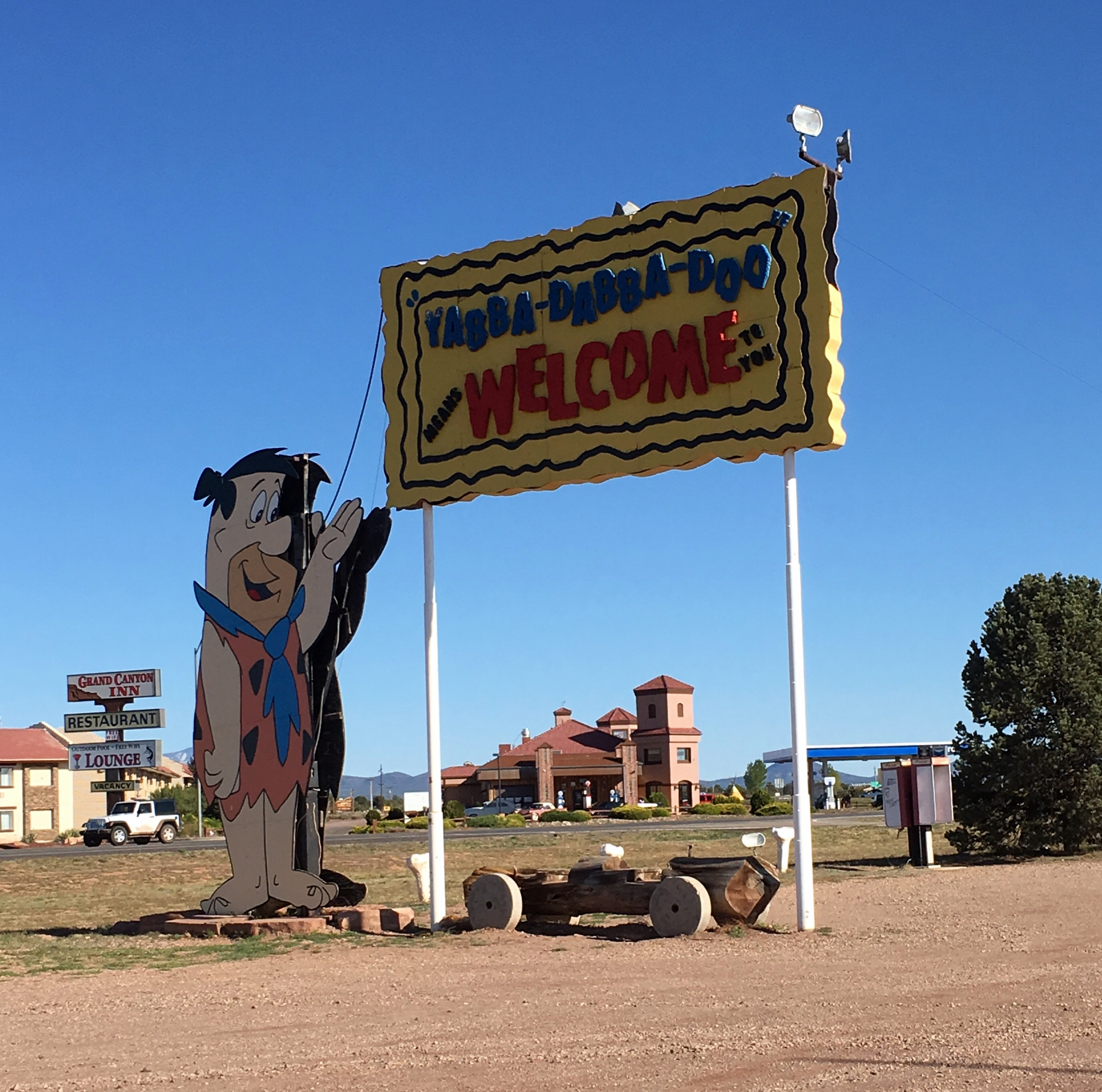
Bedrock City entrance

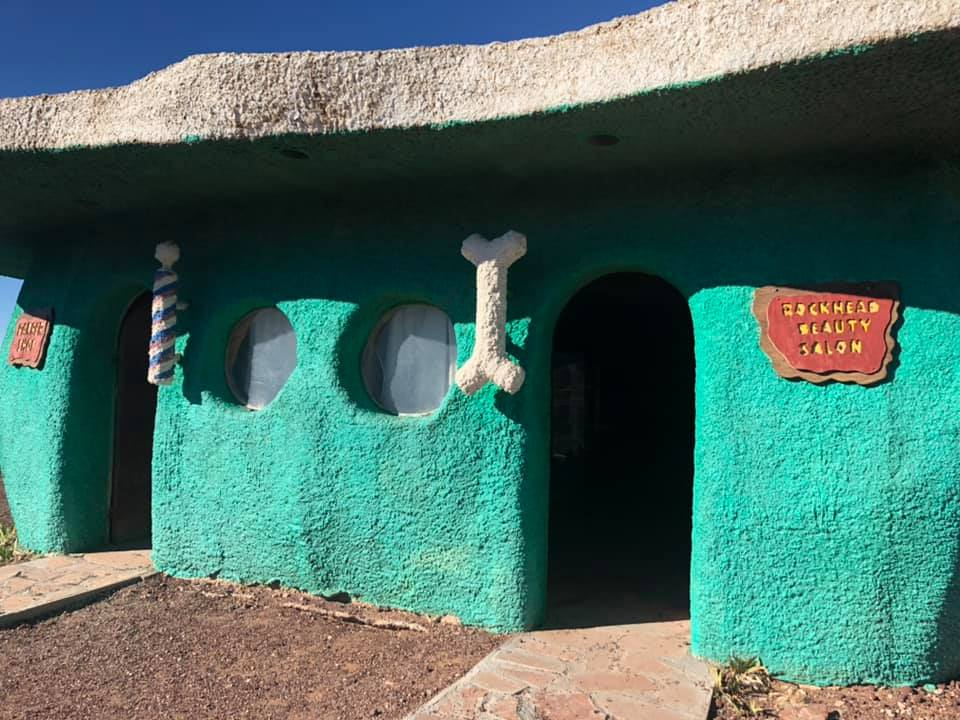
House

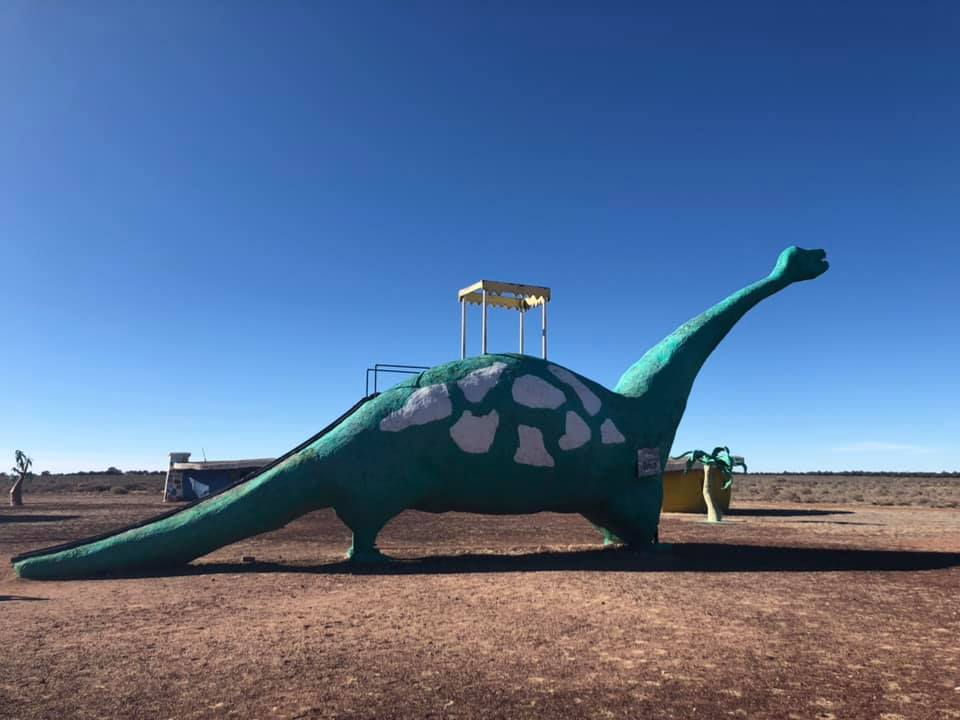
Brontosaurus

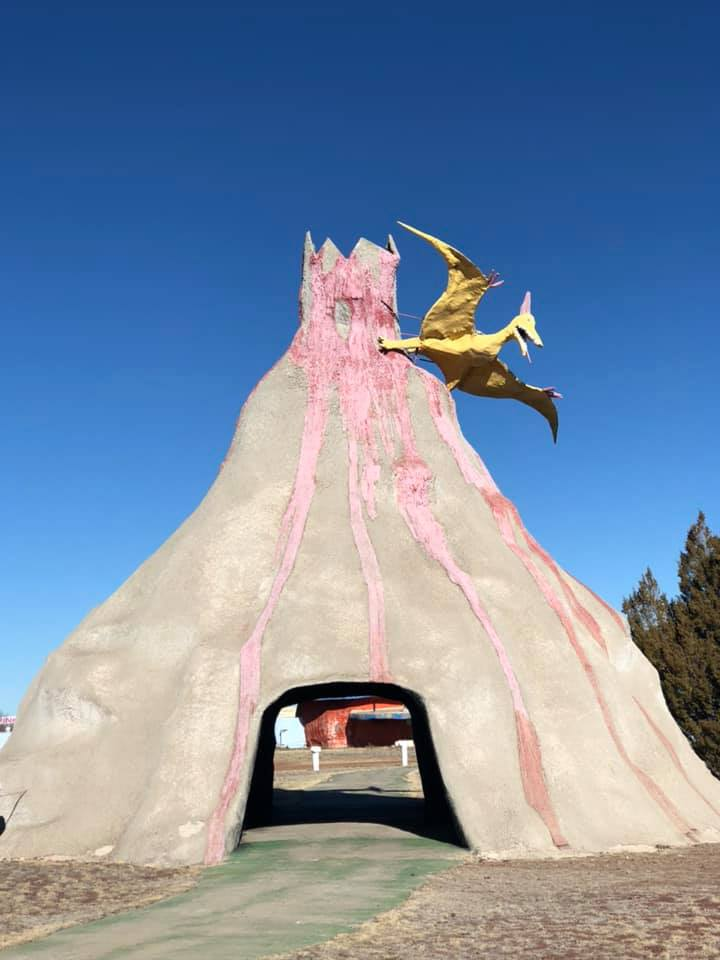
Volcano

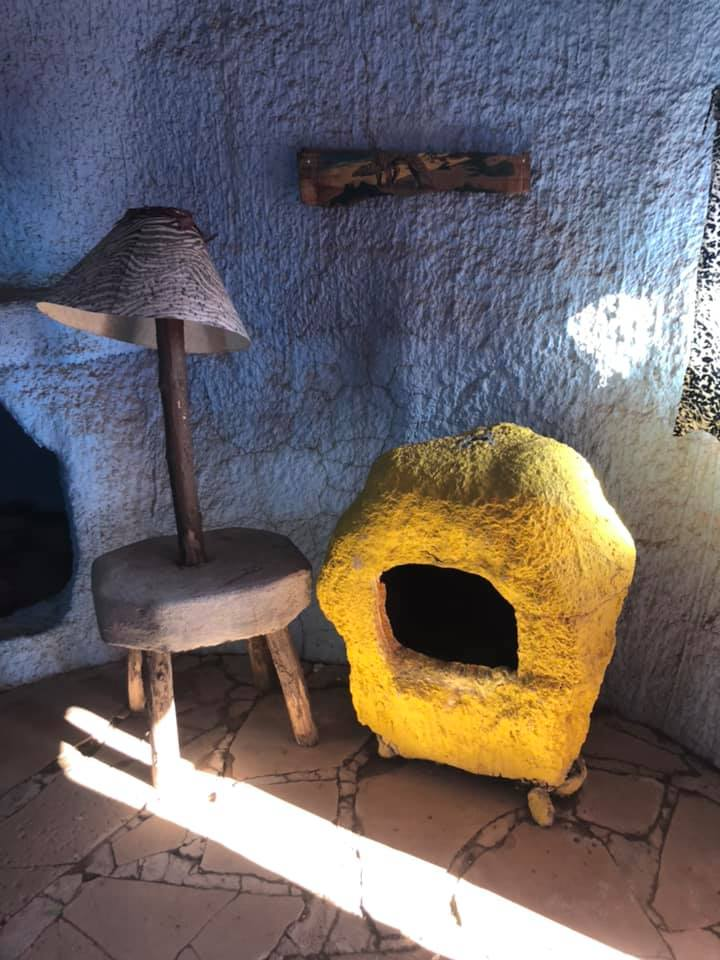
House artifacts

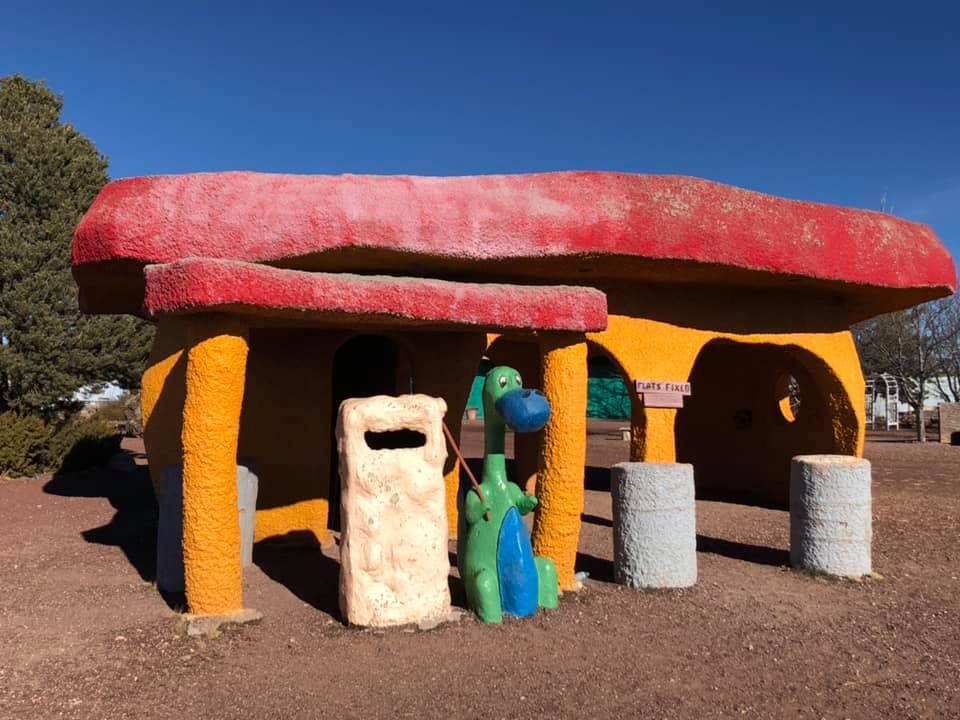
Gas Station

Note: Bedrock City closed January 28, 2019.
