= Lauren Camp =

American poet

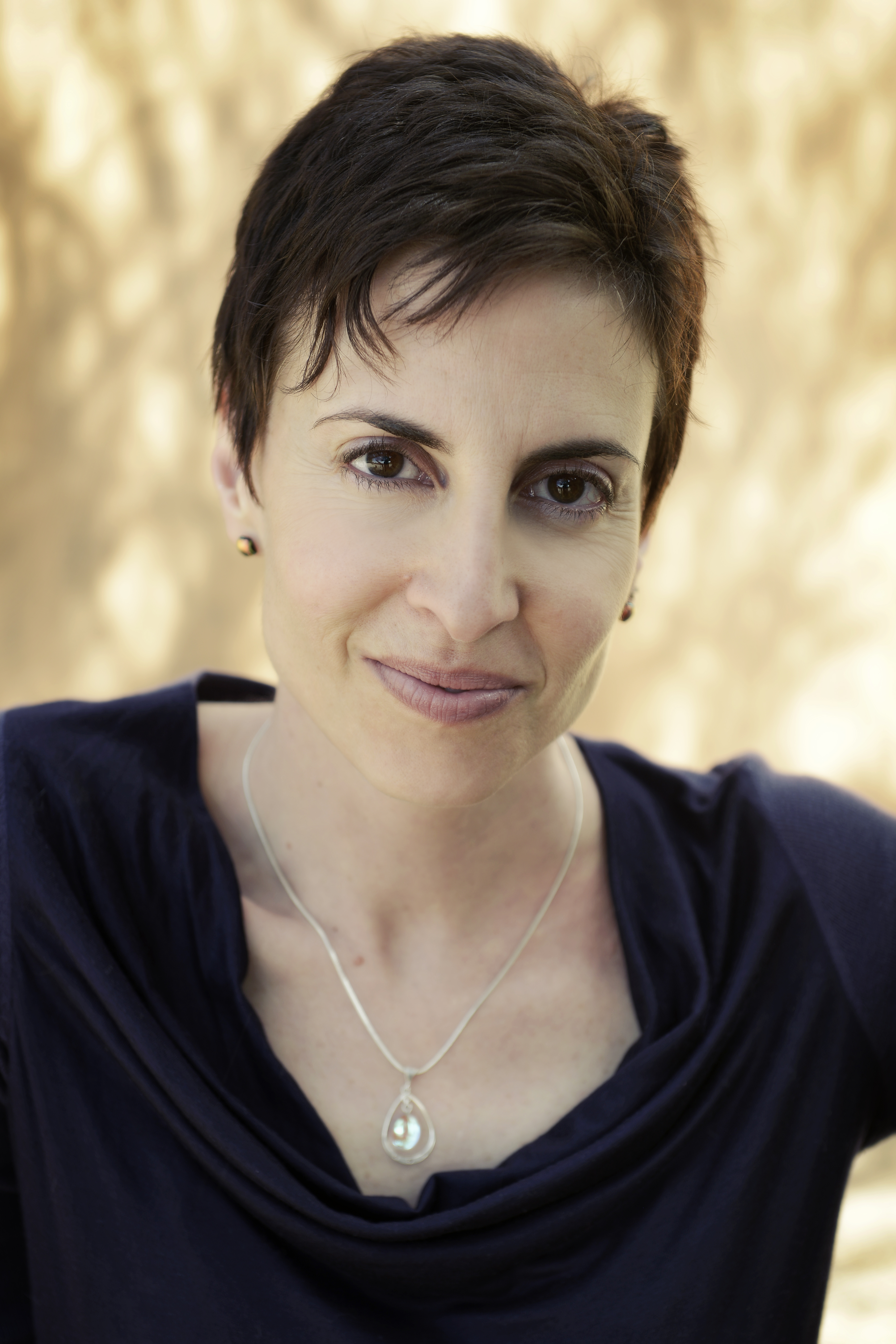
- Born: New York
- Education: Cornell University; Emerson College
- Occupations: New Mexico Poet Laureate, writer and educator
- Awards: Dorset Prize; Arab American Book Award (finalist)
- Honours: Astronomer in Residence at Grand Canyon National Park
- Website: laurencamp.com

Lauren Camp served as the second New Mexico Poet Laureate from 2022–25, and spearheaded the New Mexico Epic Poem Project, a series of visits to rural communities that will result in broadsides, an exhibit and an anthology.

She is the author of nine poetry collections, most recently Is Is Enough, which addresses themes of heritage, family, and dementia.

Her book In Old Sky grew out of her experience as Astronomer-in-Residence at Grand Canyon National Park. Worn Smooth between Devourings, was featured on New Mexico PBS. The Columbia Daily Tribune said An Eye in Each Square is "perhaps the finest collection of the year." One Hundred Hungers was selected by David Wojahn for the Dorset Prize, and went on to win finalist citations for the Arab American Book Award, the Housatonic Book Award and the Sheila Margaret Motton Book Prize.

== Work ==
According to Jacqueline Kolosov, "One of Camp’s gifts is her ability to conjure both the historical and the mythic past and the joint terrain they inhabit, with a vividness that, at its best, captures moments infused with both sorrow and joy."

Writing in Poet Lore, Margaret Randall said, "Camp pulls together and makes full sense of the questions that have nudged and troubled her…the places claimed by remembering and forgetting, the ways in which gender inhabits time and place, the identity she holds…"

Publishers Weekly says of Camp's work, “There are smaller surprises that intertwine with this larger narrative… the ideas of loss and forgetting become more evident with each poem.”

Electric Literature, in acknowledging One Hundred Hungers for "7 Books of Poetry by Arab American Women," wrote "Camp is a master of the luscious line... It is one of the most sensuous books you’ll ever read and characteristic of the gorgeousness of her work." In its review of One Hundred Hungers, World Literature Today describes "the oddity of diaspora within diaspora through evocative imagery and diction […] and direct interrogation of political (and personal) drama.”

Washington Independent Review of Books says of Took House, “It’s as if Camp is holding a magnifying glass in the light until the page beneath it catches fire,” and World Literature Today, in an "Editor’s Pick", states, “The ‘sinew and lava’ of both desire and loss pulse right beneath the surface of the poems...”

She is the subject of an episode of Grace Cavalieri's The Poet and the Poem for The Library of Congress and a long-form interview by David Naimon on Between the Covers. She has presented her poems at the Mayo Clinic, the Oklahoma Center for the Humanities, The Georgia O'Keeffe Museum and the International Studies Institute.

Camp is an inaugural Land Line Resident with Denver Botanic Gardens. She was a juror for the 2014 Neustadt International Prize for Literature and was selected to be one of 100 international artists for 100 Offerings of Peace.

Camp's writing has appeared in The Nation, Kenyon Review, Poet Lore, Waxwing, Beloit Poetry Journal, Weber and the Poem-a-Day series from The Academy of American Poets. The Rumpus published a long interview with Camp about her book, Took House. Her honors include a fellowship from the Black Earth Institute, and translations of her poems to Turkish, Spanish, Arabic, French and Mandarin.

== Books ==
- Is Is Enough, Texas Review Press, 2026. ISBN 978-1-68003-452-3
- In Old Sky, Grand Canyon Conservancy, 2024. ISBN 978-1-934656-59-4
- Worn Smooth between Devourings, NYQ Books, 2023. ISBN 978-1-63045-102-8
- An Eye in Each Square, River River Books, 2023. ISBN 979-8-9881378-0-1
- Took House, Tupelo Press, 2020. ISBN 978-1-946482-32-7
- Turquoise Door, 3: A Taos Press, 2018. ISBN 978-0-9972011-9-2
- One Hundred Hungers, Tupelo Press, 2016. ISBN 978-1-936797-72-1
- The Dailiness, Edwin E. Smith Publishing, 2013. ISBN 978-1-6192755-6-0
- This Business of Wisdom, West End Press, 2010. ISBN 978-0-9826968-2-8

== Honors ==
- 2025 New Mexico-Arizona Book Award
- 2023 Academy of American Poets Laureate Fellowship
- 2023 Big Other Book Award (Finalist)
- 2022 - 2025 New Mexico Poet Laureate
- 2022 Grand Canyon Astronomer in Residence
- 2021 National Indie Excellence Awards (Finalist)
- 2021 Southwest Book Design Awards (Finalist)
- 2017 Arab American Book Award (Finalist)
- 2017 Housatonic Book Award (Finalist)
- 2016 Sheila Margaret Motton Book Prize (Finalist)
- 2014 The Dorset Prize
- 2014 National Federation of Press Women Poetry Book Prize
- 2012 The Anna Davidson Rosenberg Poetry Award
