= Widforss =

Widforss is a surname of Swedish origin. Notable people with the surname include:

- Gunnar Widforss (1879–1934), Swedish-American artist who specialized in painting subjects from the wilderness
- Nils Widforss (1880–1960), Swedish gymnast who competed in the 1908 Summer Olympics

== Other ==
- Widforss Trail, hiking trail located on the North Rim of the Grand Canyon National Park
