= Grand Canyon Pioneer Cemetery =

Historic cemetery in Arizona, United States

Coordinates: 36°03′16″N 112°07′30″W

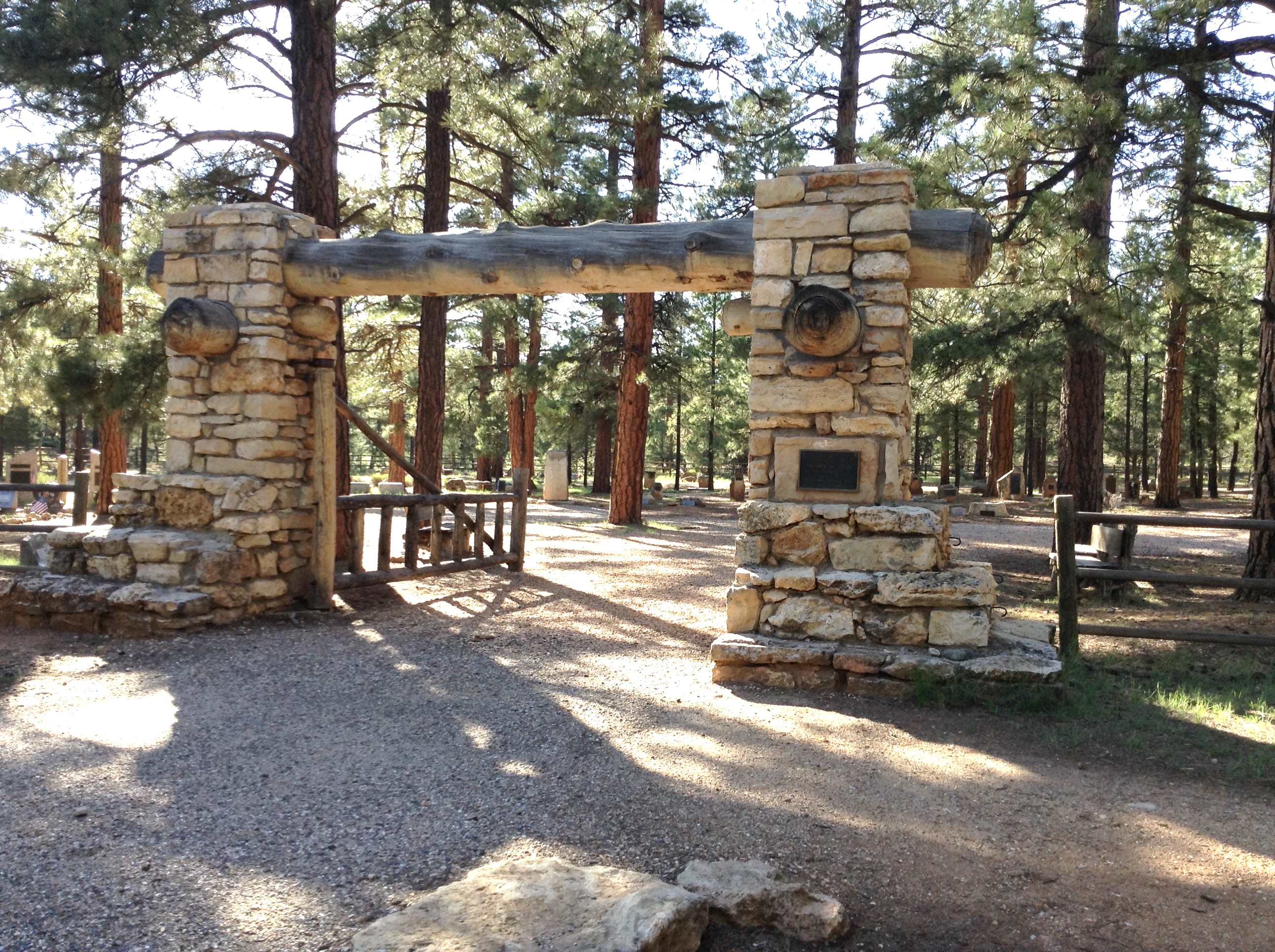

Grand Canyon Pioneer Cemetery, also known as Pioneer Cemetery, is a historic cemetery located near the Grand Canyon's South Rim. It is also known as South Rim Cemetery and the American Legion Cemetery due to its association with the veterans' organization.

The cemetery is home to some 400 individual graves. The cemetery closed to new burials in 2017, but remains open for visitation.

"Originally, to qualify for burial, an individual must have lived at Grand Canyon for no less than three years or must have made a significant and substantial contribution to the development of, public knowledge about, understanding of or appreciation for Grand Canyon National Park." Among those buried there are pioneers, NPS administrators of Grand Canyon National Park and residents of Grand Canyon Village including John Hance (1840–1919) early white settler and Grand Canyon guide, Pete Berry, Ralph H. Cameron (1863–1953) American businessman, prospector, and politician William Wallace Bass, members of the Kolb Family (Ellwworth and Emery), who established the Kolb Studio, and M.R. Tillotson. Hance is the first to have been buried there. Also buried in the cemetery are the unidentified remains of the victims on the United Airlines flight involved in the 1956 Grand Canyon mid-air collision, with a cenotaph of 31 names.

Other noteworthy burials include:

- William J. Breed (1928–2013) geologist and expert on the Grand Canyon
- David White (1862–1935) who studied the Grand Canyon
- Gunnar Widforss (1879–1934) Swedish-American painter.
