= William J. Breed =

American geologist (1928–2013)

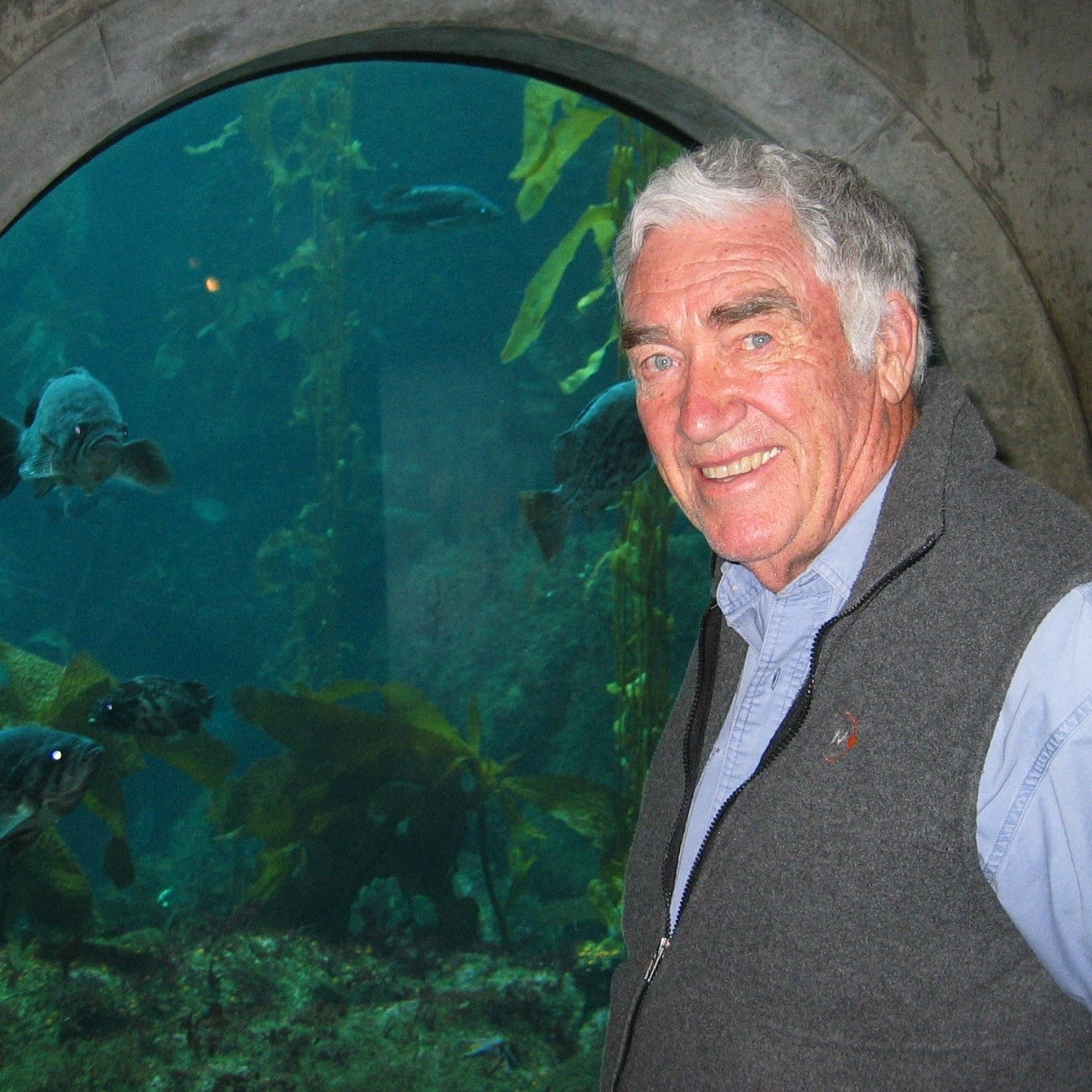
- Born: August 3, 1928; Massillon, Ohio
- Died: 22 January 2013 (aged 84); Flagstaff, Arizona
- Education: Massillon Washington High School; Denison University; University of Arizona
- Known for: Grand Canyon; Northern Arizona; Dilophosaurus; Lystrosaurus
- Awards: Fulbright Scholarship (1957–58); National Science Foundation – Antarctic Service Medal (1977); Gladys Cole Award – Geological Society of America(1982)
- Scientific career
- Fields: Geomorphology; Geology; Vertebrate Paleontology
- Workplaces: U.S. Geological Survey; Museum of Northern Arizona; Nature Expeditions International

William J. "Bill" Breed (August 3, 1928 – January 22, 2013) was an American geologist, paleontologist, naturalist and author in Northern Arizona. He was a renowned expert on the geology of the Grand Canyon.

== Personal life ==
William J. Breed was born August 3, 1928, in Massillon, Ohio, son of Grace Amelia (née Snyder) and Earl Fremont Breed. After graduating from Massillon Washington High School, he served in the U.S. Army Corps of Military Police in South Korea and Japan (1946–48). He received his B.A. from Denison University, then his B.S. and M.S. from University of Arizona, finishing in 1960. He married Carol S. Breed daughter of James Neilson (director) and Mrs. Ruth Swope (née Rogers) in 1965. The couple had one daughter, Amelia, who joined the family of four girls (Linda, Laura, Grace, Pamela) from Carol's first marriage.

Upon his death in 2013 he was buried at the Grand Canyon Pioneer Cemetery.

== Career ==
Bill Breed was a Fulbright Scholar at Canterbury University in Christchurch, New Zealand to study geomorphology in 1957–58.

Bill Breed was a protégé of Edwin D. McKee. Breed was Curator of Geology (1960–78), Head, Geology Department (1978–81) at the Museum of Northern Arizona in Flagstaff, Arizona. In 1969, Breed and Edwin H. Colbert were two of the four vertebrate paleontologists in Antarctica who helped solidify the acceptance of continental drift theory, by finding a 220-million-year-old fossil of a Lystrosaurus. In the 1970s, Breed completed numerous publications on the Grand Canyon, including a geologic cross section map of the Grand Canyon, San Francisco Peaks and Verde Valley; and the book, Geology of the Grand Canyon.

A species of Dilophosaurus, (D. breedorum), discovered by Sam Welles in Arizona in 1964 was named after William J. Breed and his wife at the time Carol S. Breed. This name came out in a private publication distributed by Pickering, but has not been accepted in other reviews of the genus.

After leaving the Museum of Northern Arizona in 1981, Breed became a naturalist guide for Nature Expeditions International and Betchart Expeditions leading trips to Alaska, New Zealand, Galapagos, Namibia, and Australia. He became Curator Emeritus of the Museum of Northern Arizona in 2004. In January 2013, shortly before his death, Breed was named a Distinguished Fellow of the Museum of Northern Arizona.

Breed was an active environmentalist with Ted Danson and many others.

== Awards ==
Fellow of the Geological Society of America, the A.A.A.S, the Arizona Academy of Science, and the Museum of Northern Arizona.
National Science Foundation – Antarctic Service Medal (1977)
Geological Society of America – Gladys Cole Award (1982)
Distinguished Citizen Award from Massillon Washington High School in 2005.

== Publications ==
Breed wrote or contributed to more than 80 scientific publications and popular magazines.

- 1964: "Metacoceras bowmani, a new species of Nautiloid from the Toroweap Formation (Permian) of Arizona," Journal of Paleontology; v. 38, No. 5, pp. 877–880 (with Halsey W. Miller Jr)
- 1965: "An exotic occurrence of fresh water drum fish," Plateau v. 37, No. 3, p. 5.
- 1967: "Evolution of the Colorado River in Arizona" 'Museum of Northern Arizona Bulletin' #44, pp. 67 (with Edwin D. McKee, R.F. Wilson, and Carol S. Breed.)
- 1969: "A Pliocene river channel near Doney Crater, Arizona" Journal of Arizona Academy of Sciences, vol. 5, No. 3, pp. 177–181.
- 1969: "The Chuar Group of the Grand Canyon, Arizona." Geological Society of America Rocky Mountain Section, Abstracts with Programs, May 7–11, 1969, pp. 23–24. (with Trevor D. Ford)
- 1970: "Hopi Pahos at the South Pole" Plateau V. 42, No. 4, pp. 125
- 1970: "Triassic Tetrapods from Antarctica: Evidence of Continental Drift" Science V. 169, No. 3951, pp. 1197–1201 (with David H Elliot, Edwin H. Colbert, James Jensen and Jon S. Powell)
- 1971: "Last Chance for Rainbow Bridge?" Outdoor Arizona, pp. 38–41
- 1974: Geology of the Grand Canyon, by William J. Breed and Evelyn C. Roat
- 1974: "Red Mountain, Erosion or Explosion," Plateau, Vol. 46, No. 3, pp. 120–122.
- 1975: Geologic Cross Section of the Grand Canyon – San Francisco Peaks – Verde Valley Region Zion Natural History Association, Springdale, Utah
- 1976: "Our "Unchanging" Grand Canyon", Arizona Highways, Vol. 52, No. 5, pp. 12–15.
- 1977: "Chitinozoans from the Late Precambrian Chuar Group of the Grand Canyon, Arizona" Science, Vol. 195, No. 4279, pp. 676–679 (with Bonnie Bloeser, Wiliam J. Schopf and Robert J. Horodyski)

== External links and references ==
- Arizona Daily Sun, January 24, 2013, A2 Today's Arizona Daily Sun Obituaries
- Newsweek: My Favorite Mistake
- William J. Breed at Find a Grave
