= The Poet and the Poem =

Radio interview show

- Genre: Poetry
- Running time: ca. 50 min.
- Country of origin: United States
- Language: English
- Hosted by: Grace Cavalieri
- Recording studio: Washington, DC
- Original release: present
- Audio format: Stereophonic
- Website: Grace Cavalieri
- Podcast: Podcast

The Poet and the Poem is an hour-long radio interview program hosted by Grace Cavalieri featuring with leading poets and sponsored by the Library of Congress and the Witter Bynner Foundation.

== History ==
The program was started in 1977 by the poet and playwright Grace Cavalieri. The program was first broadcast from WPFW in Washington, DC. Cavalieri brought the program to the Library of Congress in 1997. The programs archives are stored at the Gelman Library at George Washington University

== Featured interviews ==
The show regularly features interviews with writers from across the country. Poets featured have included Abhay K, Karren LaLonde Alenier, Francisco Aragón, Margaret Atwood, Sandra Beasley, Lucille Clifton, Cornelius Eady, Forrest Gander, Allen Ginsberg, Terrance Hayes, Major Jackson, June Jordan, Audre Lorde, Richard McCann, E. Ethelbert Miller, Naomi Shihab Nye, Linda Pastan, Kim Roberts, Henry Taylor, Emma Trelles, David Tucker, Dan Vera, and Alice Walker.

Given the program's longevity and its connection to the Library of Congress, Cavalieri has the distinction of having interviewed the most sitting poets laureate including Gwendolyn Brooks, Billy Collins, Rita Dove, Donald Hall, Ted Kooser, Stanley Kunitz, Howard Nemerov, Philip Levine, Robert Hass, Robert Pinsky, Kay Ryan and Charles Simic Mark Strand, and Richard Wilbur. The program has also featured interviews with the Witter Bynner Fellowship winners.

== Broadcast ==
The program is broadcast on public radio stations across the United States through the Public Radio Exchange. Until 2020, it was available as a free podcast from the Library of Congress website. Since 2020 it is available on iHeartRadio.
