= Wilbur Niewald =

American artist (1942–2022)

- Born: February 22, 1925; Kansas City, Missouri, U.S.
- Died: April 30, 2022 (aged 97); Mission, Kansas, U.S.
- Education: Park College; Kansas City Art Institute
- Known for: Landscapes
- Children: Janet Niewald, painter
- Website: http://www.wilburniewald.com/

Wilbur Niewald (1925–2022) was an American landscape and figurative painter active in Kansas City, Missouri from 1942–2022 primarily painting in watercolor and oils. Although Niewald worked in a Cubist style early in his career, the majority of his paintings are his view of the world around him including trees, buildings, parks and cityscapes. Works by Niewald can be found in public and private collections across the United States including the Metropolitan Museum of Art and the Nelson-Atkins Museum of Art.

== Career ==
Niewald took art lessons as a child at the Kansas City Art Institute (KCAI) and the Nelson Gallery of Art between 1935 and 1940 and began full time study at the Art Institute in 1942 immediately after graduating from high school. After a hiatus to serve in the US Naval Air Corps (commissioned as Ensign) from 1943-6 Niewald continued his education at the Art Institute, earning a Bachelor of Fine Arts in 1949 and Master of Fine Arts in 1953.

In 1949 Niewald began teaching watercolor courses at the Art Institute while working towards his master's degree and continued to work at the Art Institute until his retirement in 1992; first as professor, then as the chairman of the Painting and Printmaking Department (starting 1959), and finally as Senior Professor of Painting (the first in the college's history, 1985). His career at the Art Institute was interspersed with invitations to teach summer programs across the country and abroad at The Studio School in Paris and New York City as well as at various American universities. These teaching trips contributed to a varied ouvre of landscapes when combined with his 1965 sabbatical leave to travel Europe and live in Florence and a brief stint in 1972 where Niewald was the artist in residence at the Grand Canyon National Park.

== Personal life ==
Born in Kansas City, Missouri February 22, 1925 to parents Joseph and Cora Niewald, Wilbur Niewald married Gerry Beeler in 1952. The couple had one child, Janet, in 1953 who followed in her father's footsteps and became an artist and teacher herself. Niewald died April 30, 2022 in Mission, Kansas.

== Awards ==
- Purchase prize, Mid-America Annual, Nelson Gallery, Kansas City, Missouri (1957)
- John Simon Guggenheim Fellowship (2006)
- Distinguished Teaching of Art Award from the College Art Association of America (1988)
- Distinguished Teaching Award, Kansas City Art Institute (1991)
- Received the Lifetime Achievement Award, Charlotte Street Fund, Kansas City, Missouri (1999)

== Exhibitions ==
Niewald's work was displayed in the Kansas City Art Institute Faculty Exhibition in the 1950, 1952, and 1954 shows and was presented by the Art Institute in a solo exhibition in 1955, 1960, 1963, and 1966. Similarly, Niewald's work was shown in the Mid-America Annual Exhibition in 1952, 1954, 1956, 1957, 1959, 1963, and 1968.

- Mid-America Artists Association Member Exhibition, 1952
- Independence Community Art Association, Little Fall Art Exhibition, 1959
- Art of Two Cities Exhibition, 1965
- Wilbur Niewald: A 40 Year Retrospective, 1951-1991 Exhibition, 1967
- William McKim Solo Exhibition, Charlotte Crosby Kemper Gallery, 1992
- Exhibition of the Oppenheimer Collection, Charlotte Crosby Kemper Gallery, 2012
- In the Studio with Wilbur Niewald, Nelson Atkins Museum of Art, Kansas City, Missouri 8-8-2018 - 11-4-2018.
- Wilbur Niewald In the Landscape, Nerman Museum of Contemporary Art, Overland Park, Kansas, November 9, 2018 - February 3, 2019.

== Selected works ==
Current River II, 1965, oil on canvas, 54 1/2 x 70 1/2 in. (138.4 x 179.1 cm), Kemper Museum of Contemporary Art, 2011.24.

Kansas City, View from Greystone Heights IV, 1989, oil on canvas, 29 × 36 in. (73.66 × 91.44 cm), Nelson Atkins Museum of Art, F90-14/1.

Roanoke Park, The Castle, 1991, oil on canvas, 26 x 32 1/2 in. (66 x 82.6 cm), Kemper Museum of Contemporary Art, 2012.11.01.

Elizabeth, 1994–95, oil on canvas, 36 1/8 × 26 1/8 in. (91.8 × 66.4 cm), Metropolitan Museum of Art, 1995.246.

Trees at Linda Hall Library, 1996, oil on canvas, 29 x 36 in. (73.7 x 91.4 cm), Kemper Museum of Contemporary Art, 1998.22.

Still Life with Bowl of Apples and Grey Pitcher, 1999, oil on canvas, 26 x 32 in. (66 x 81.3 cm), Kemper Museum of Contemporary Art, 2013.12

== Bibliography ==
Artist clippings file is available at Jannes Library, Kansas City Art Institute, Kansas City, Missouri.

Mazee Bush Owens and Frances S. Bush, A History of Community Achievement: 1885-1964 (Kansas City: Kansas City Art Institute and School of Design, 1965): 84, https://archive.org/details/OwensMazeeBushCommunityAchievement/mode/2up.

Ron Zoglin, Kansas City Art Institute Alumni Directory (Kansas City, MO: Kansas City Art Institute, 1970), 69.

Hilron Kramer, Review in The New York Times, pg.14, October 1, 1976, https://www.nytimes.com/1976/10/01/archives/art-rodins-homages-to-balzac-at-modern.html?searchResultPosition=3.

Deborah Rosenthal, “Wilbur Niewald,” Arts Magazine (October 1979).

“Special Issue - Wilbur Niewald.” Tute News (Kansas City Art Institute), April 15, 1985.

Donald Hoffmann, “Seeing the world anew each day,” Kansas City Star, Arts, March 15, 1988.

Jama J. Akers, “Kansas City Artist Recipient of Prestigious National Award: Awarded the College Art Association’s Distinguished Teaching of Art Award for 1988. 1st Kansas Citian to ever receive the award,” Press Release, Kansas City Art Institute, 1988.

Deborah Emont Scott, "New at the Nelson: Niewald Landscapes", Nelson-Atkins Museum, pg. 3 December 1990.

Alice Thorson, Realist started in abstraction, Kansas City Star, 1992.

“Wilbur Niewald Interview,” Assemblage (Kansas City Art Institute), Spring 1992.

"Essay," in catalog for Wilbur Niewald, A Forty Year Retrospective, by Deborah Rosenthal, 1992, 7-9.

Alice Thorson, “National Academy of Design Taps KC Painter,” Kansas City Star, June 12, 1994.

Lawrence Campbell, "Wilbur Niewald," in catalog for New York Studio School show, Recent Painitngs 1990-1995, 1995, 4-5.

Alice Thorson, "An artist, peeling the onion one layer at a time," Kansas City Star, 1998.

Alice Thorson, "Niewald's Embrace of Realism on exhibit," The Kansas City Star, May 30, 2004.

Michael Humphrey, "A Compulsion To Paint," Star Magazine, December 17, 2006.

Lance Esplund, "Wilbur Niewald at Rider University Art Gallery," Art in America, 185-186, 2006.

Elizabeth Kirsch, "Wilbur Niewald Early Paintings at Dolphin Gallery," Review, 60-64, 2006.

Jan Schall, Wilbur Niewald, 10/Charlotte Street Foundation, 2007.

Dana Self, "Not-So-Still Life," Pitch, 27, October, 2007.

Video Interview with Wilbur Niewald, It's Our Community with Dr. Mary E. Davidson, Johnson County Community College, 2011.

Elizabeth Kirsh, "Simplicity Defines His Work," Kansas City Star, February 5, 2012.

“In the Studio Spans 70 Year Commitment to Visual Truth,” Nelson-Atkins Museum of Art, July 31, 2018.

“Wilbur Niewald: a continuing brushstroke,” interview by Jan Smith and Bob Stone.

Terry Oldham, Excerpts from Conversation with the Artist Wilbur Niewald, Albrecht Kemper Museum of Art, St. Joseph, Kansas.
