= John Hance =

American activist (1840–1919)

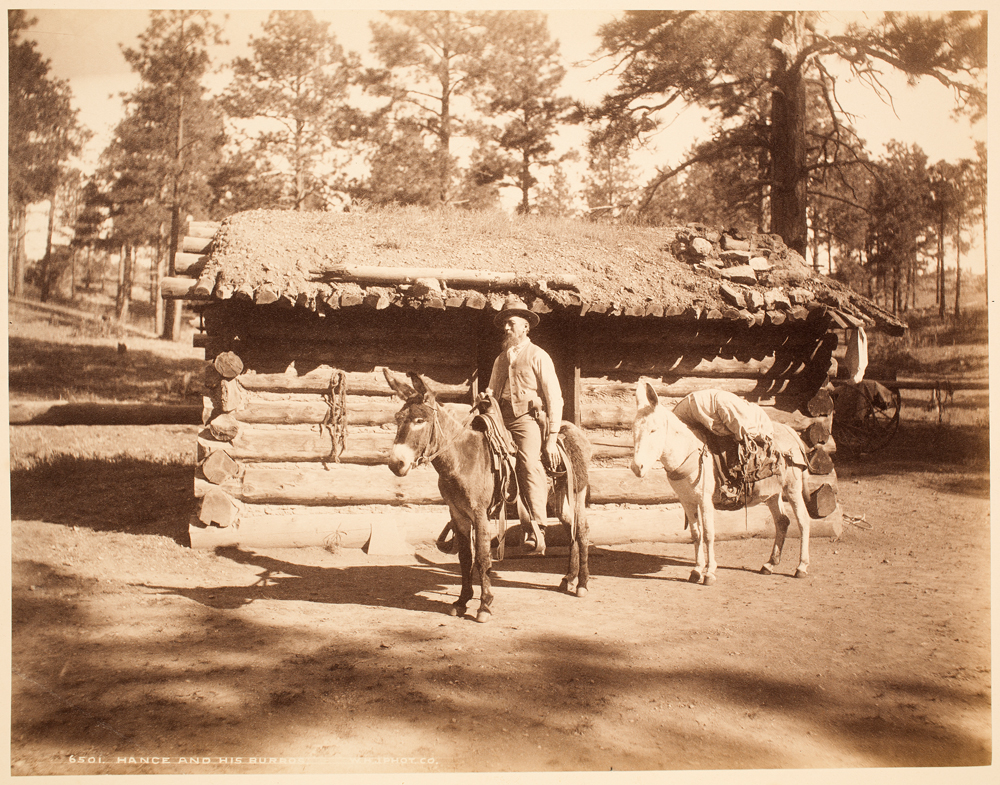
- John Hance is believed to be the first non-Native American resident on the Grand Canyon.
- Born: 1840
- Died: January 26, 1919 (aged 78–79)
- Occupation(s): pioneer, trailblazer, guide

John Hance (September 7, 1837 – January 6, 1919) is thought to be the first non-Native American resident of the Grand Canyon, US. He opened the first tourist trail, today known as Old Hance Trail, into Grand Canyon in 1884, well before his mining activities began. "Captain" John Hance was said to be one of the Grand Canyon's most colorful characters, and it had been declared by one early visitor that "To see the canyon only and not to see Captain John Hance, is to miss half the show." Hance delighted in telling canyon stories to visitors, favoring the whopper of a tale over mere facts. With a straight face, Hance told travelers how he had dug the canyon himself, piling the excavated earth down near Flagstaff (a dirt pile now known as the San Francisco Peaks). Despite such questionable claims, Hance left a lasting legacy at the Grand Canyon, dying in 1919, the year the Grand Canyon became a National Park. Hance was the first person buried in what would become the Grand Canyon Pioneer Cemetery.
