= Gunnar Widforss =

Swedish-American painter (1879–1934)

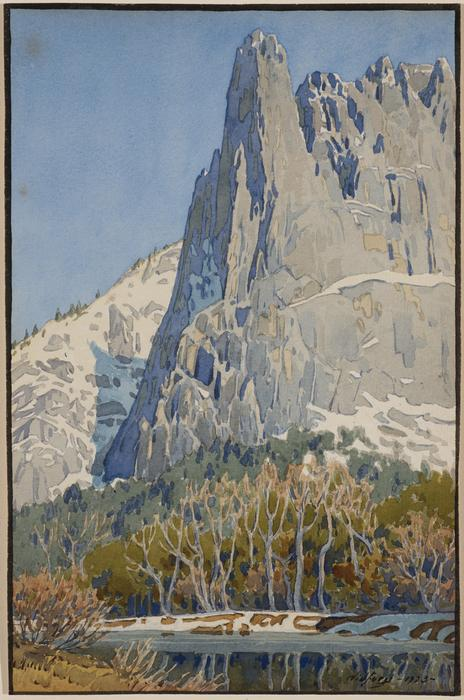
Sentinel Rock (1923)

Gunnar Mauritz Widforss (October 21, 1879 – November 30, 1934) was a Swedish American artist who specialized in painting subjects from the wilderness in watercolor. Widforss is most frequently associated with landscapes from American National Parks.

== Early life ==
Gunnar Widforss was born in Stockholm, Sweden. He was the son of Mauritz Widforss and Blenda Carolina Weydenhayn, who were the parents of thirteen children. Mauritz Widforss (1836-1905) owned a hunting apparel retailer bearing his name, which in 1968 was acquired by Erling Persson to form Hennes & Mauritz (H&M). Widforss' mother was an amateur artist who had studied at the Technical Institute, now Konstfack, University College of Arts, Crafts and Design. At the age of sixteen Widforss began his studies of painting at the same school.

Following the completion of his studies at the Technical Institute in 1900, Widforss traveled to St. Petersburg, Russia to work as an apprentice decorative painter. He returned home a year-and-a-half later and then embarked on an extended period of travel around Europe and America. Widforss worked primarily in watercolor and he led a bohemian lifestyle traveling in search of great landscapes to paint. Between 1904 and 1909 he ventured to Austria, Switzerland, the Mediterranean region and North Africa. From 1906 to 1907 he visited the United States where he resided in Jacksonville, Florida and later Brooklyn, New York doing odd jobs and paintings on commission.

== Career ==
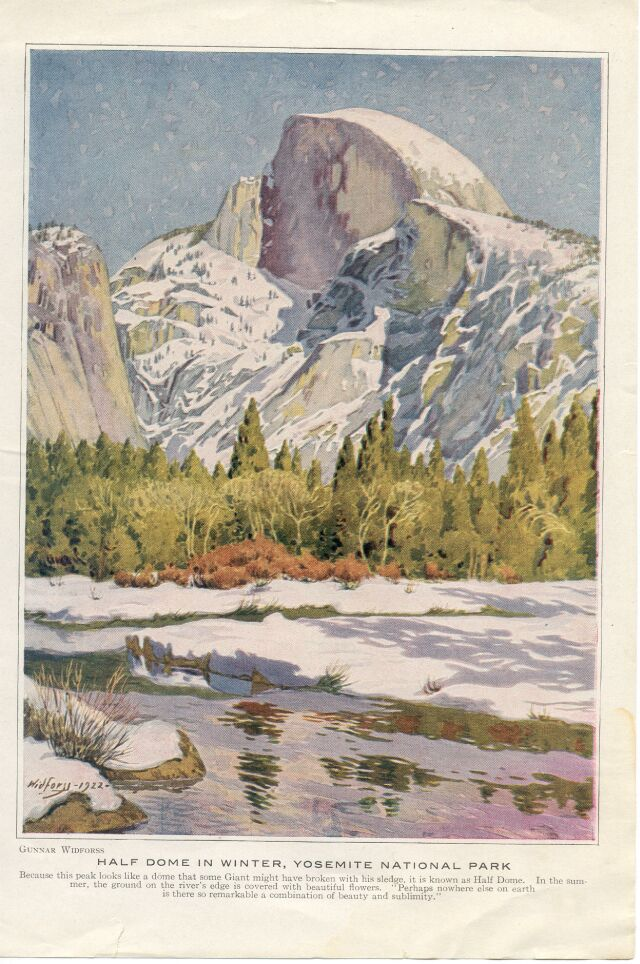
Half Dome rising above Yosemite Valley (1922)

Soon after arriving in California in early 1921, Widforss made his way to Yosemite Valley. He made it his semi-regular home from 1921 to 1926. It was in Yosemite that he met National Park Service director Stephen T. Mather. Mather became a friend and patron and suggested that Widforss focus his talents on America's National Parks. In 1923 Widforss illustrated Harold Symmes book "Songs of Yosemite."

By the late summer of 1921 he had consigned his watercolors to San Francisco's Gump Gallery and was painting and exhibiting in Carmel. Thereafter, he had successful exhibitions in: Los Angeles at the Stendahl Galleries and the California Water Color Society; the East Bay at the Oakland Art Gallery and Hotel Oakland; and San Francisco at the Rabjohn & Morcom Gallery and regularly at Gump's. According to the U.S. Census in April 1930, he resided as a lodger in the San Francisco home of Théophile Fritzen and was an unmarried landscape artist who officially became a naturalized citizen of the United States in 1929.

Widforss made his first trip to the Southwest in 1923, visiting Grand Canyon, Zion and Bryce Canyon National Parks. The following year the artist made his only trip to Yellowstone National Park where he made numerous paintings of the spectacular canyon and falls of the Yellowstone River.

In 1934, Widforss painted eight works for the Public Works of Art Project (PWAP). Among the large watercolors were paintings of the Salt River Valley, Camelback Mountain, and Grand Canyon. Widforss lived briefly at the home of Emery and Ellsworth Kolb, operators of the Kolb Studio on the rim and later resided in a Fred Harvey Company dormitory. His paintings were sold in the art gallery in the lobby of the El Tovar Hotel.

Major museum exhibitions of Widforss' work have been rare. The first was presented in December 1924 at the National Gallery of Art in Washington, D.C. The exhibit included 72 watercolors that primarily included scenes of western National parks. William Henry Holmes, the first Director of the National Gallery of Art in Washington. D. C., and an artist also known for his extraordinarily accurate drawings and watercolors, commented on Widforss' Grand Canyon paintings in the exhibit. "They are remarkable as to geological construction and color. They give a more satisfactory understanding of the Grand Canyon than any that have hitherto been attempted. It is well nigh impossible to convey the immensity and grandeur of these marvels of nature but Widforss has accomplished it." Holmes went on to say that "These are some of the finest things of their kind that have come out of the West." In 1926 and 1928 Widforss participated in two exhibits at the Brooklyn Museum of art sponsored by the Society of Scandinavian American Artists. Exhibition history.

In 1934, Widforss was diagnosed with heart disease and told to avoid the high altitude of Grand Canyon Village. He died not long after on November 30, 1934, at the South Rim of a heart attack at the age of fifty-five. He was buried by his friends in the Grand Canyon Pioneer Cemetery on the South Rim. His estate contained over 150 finished and unfinished paintings.

== Legacy ==
Gunnar Widforss left a great legacy and inspiration for the realistic painters of western landscapes. The accuracy of his drawing and use of color and his ability to express deep space and atmospheric effects are unrivaled. In his commitment to the truth and beauty of his subject, Widforss never resorted to sentimental or romanticized depictions, so prevalent in depictions of the West.

The Widforss Trail on the North Rim of the Grand Canyon was named for Gunnar Widforss. The trailhead is approximately 3 miles north of the North Rim Lodge. The trail follows the canyon rim and meanders through the forest to emerge at Widforss Point. Widforss Point is a narrow, wooded promontory half a mile southeast of the end of the Widforss trail.

== Gallery ==
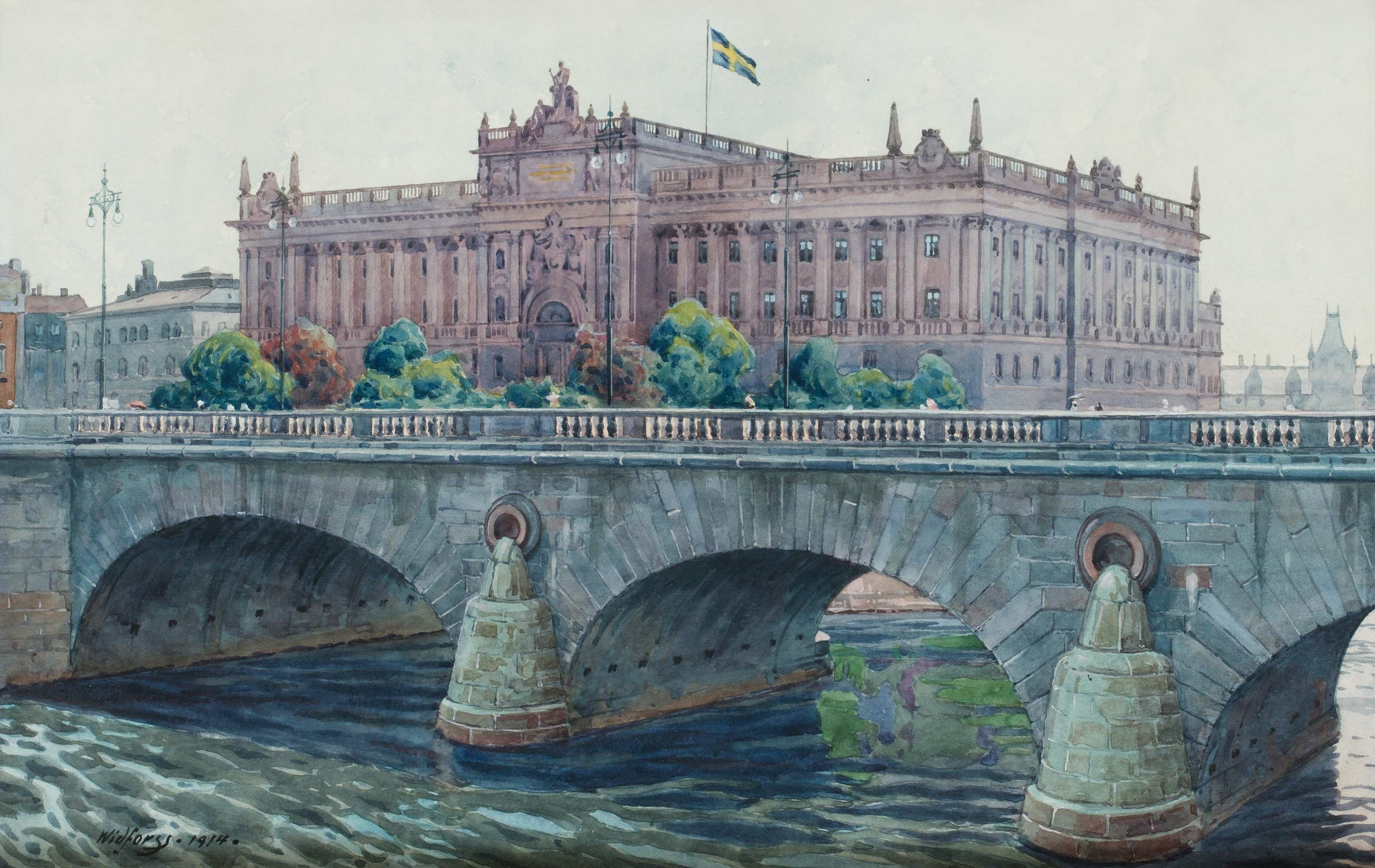
View towards the Parliament House
(1914)

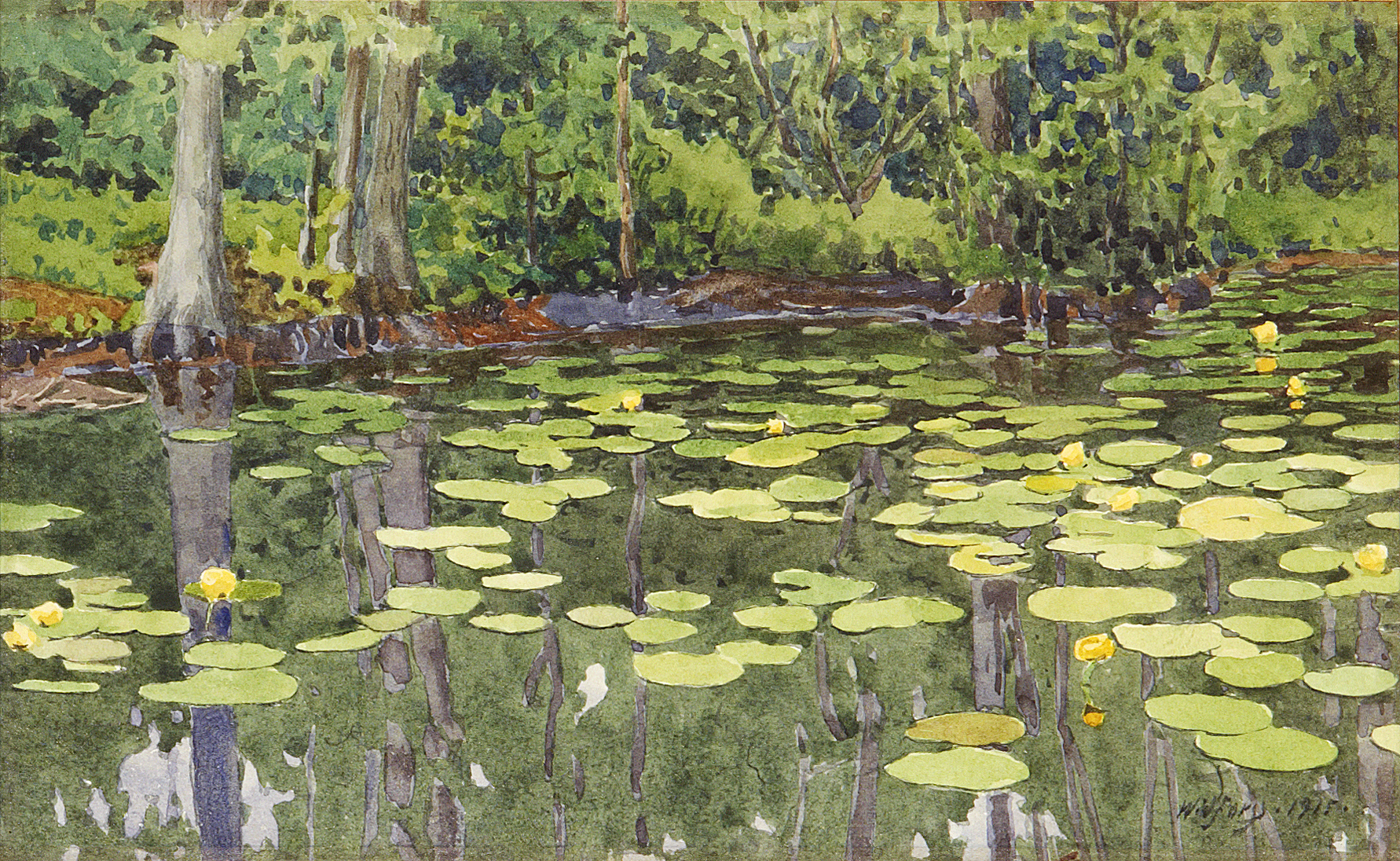
Water-Lily Pond
(1915)

== Selected works ==
- Harold Symmes (1923) Songs of Yosemite (Yosemite, CA: Ansel Hall) Poetry by Harold Symmes, watercolor illustrations by Gunnar Widforss.
