= Poet Laureate of Maryland =

Official poets for the state of Maryland

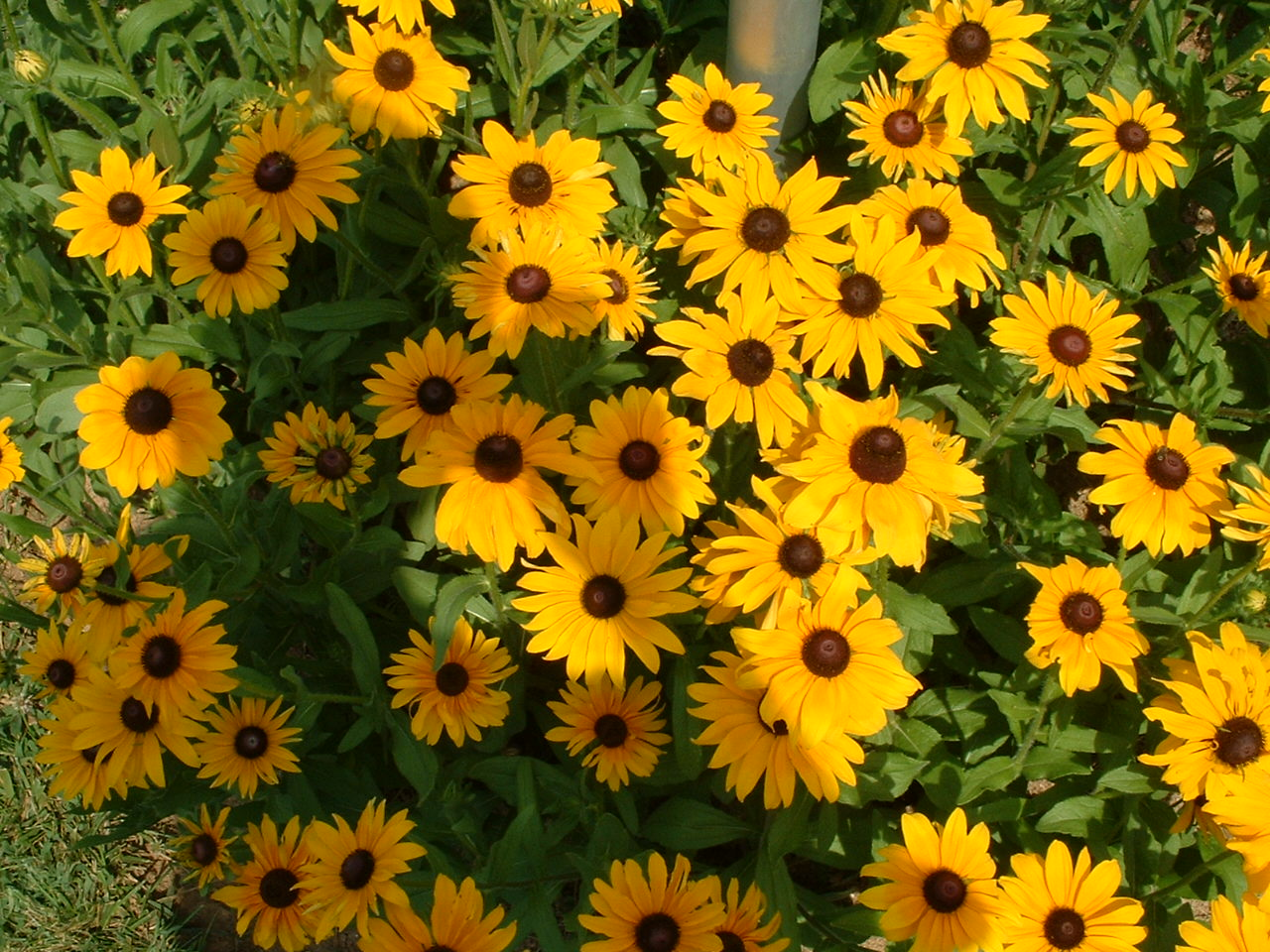
Black-eyed Susans, state flower of Maryland

The poet laureate of Maryland is an honorary position in Maryland. The selected poet laureate serves at the discretion of the Governor for up to a four-year term, renewable by the Governor's consent. The poet laureate provides public readings and special programs for the citizens of Maryland, ensuring that people in all geographic regions of the State have access to at least one reading during the term of service.

In the 18th century, Ebenezer Cook, author of the poem "The Sot-weed Factor: Or, A Voyage to Maryland (1708)", styled himself Maryland's poet laureate. Maryland did not have an official poet, however, until 1959. In that year, the Maryland General Assembly authorized the governor to appoint a citizen of the state as poet laureate of Maryland (Chapter 178, Acts of 1959; Code State Government Article, sec. 13-306). Originally the term was for three years. Since then, some poets laureate have been reappointed. Vincent Godfrey Burns served the longest, for 17 years.

== List of poets laureate ==
State flag of Maryland

The following are the poets laureate of Maryland.

Poet laureate	Term began	Term ended	Notes
Maria B. Croker	1959	1962	
Vincent Godfrey Burns	1962	1979	
Lucille Clifton	1979	1985	
Reed Whittemore	1985	1988	
Linda Pastan	1991	1995	
Roland Flint	1995	2000	
Michael Collier	2001	2004	
Michael S. Glaser	2004	2009	
Stanley Plumly	2009	2018	
Grace Cavalieri	2018	2024	
Lady Brion Gill	2024		

== See also ==
- Poet laureate definition and history
- List of U.S. state poets laureate
- Literature of Maryland
- Southern United States literature Maryland has been historically considered a part of the American south
