= Ira Pastan =

American scientist (born 1931)

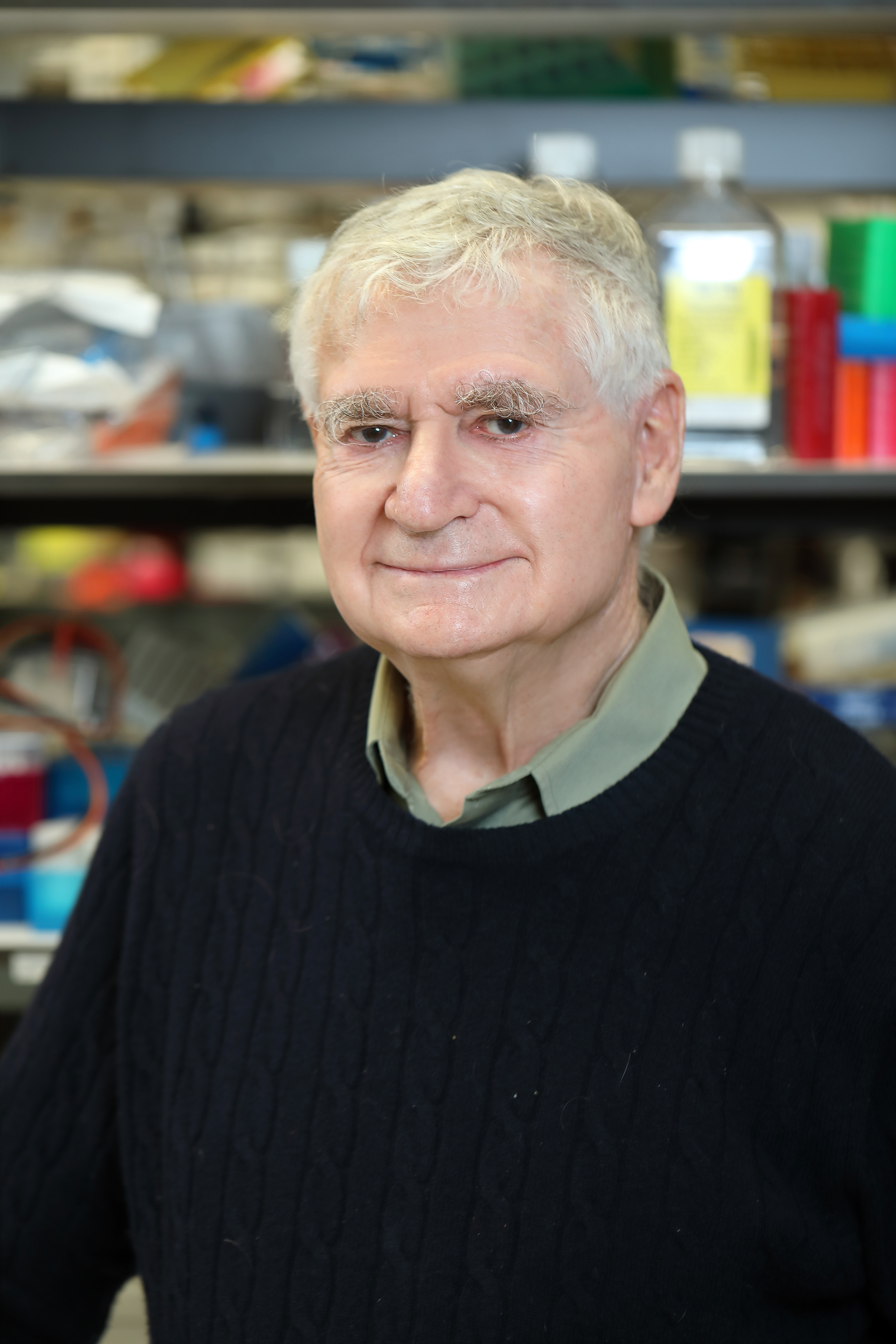

Ira Pastan (born in Winthrop, Massachusetts June 1, 1931) is an American scientist at the National Cancer Institute. He is a member of the National Academy of Sciences, a Fellow of the AAAS and the American Society of Microbiology. In 2009, he was awarded the prestigious International Antonio Feltrinelli Prize for Medicine. His wife, Linda Pastan, was an American poet.

== Biography ==
Pastan attended the Boston Public Latin School, Tufts College, and Tufts Medical School. He did his residency at the Yale School of Medicine (1957-1959).

Pastan conducted research training in endocrinology at NIH with Earl Stadtman starting in 1959. In 1970, he founded the Laboratory of Molecular Biology (LMB) in the National Cancer Institute (the largest Institute of the National Institutes of Health). He is currently co-chief of the LMB and is working on various Immunotoxin Therapies.

== Research activities ==
Pastan pioneered the field of receptor biology in animal cells and identified a major receptor mediated pathway of gene regulation in bacteria. With Robert L. Perlman, he established the first general mechanism of positive gene regulation in bacteria showing that cyclic AMP and its receptor protein CRP (cyclic AMP receptor protein) positively regulated the activity of many genes. These studies serve as a paradigm for the mechanism of action of cyclic AMP and steroid hormones on gene expression in animal cells. His current research is focused on developing Recombinant Immunotoxins (RITs) as a new treatment for cancer. Gene splicing techniques are used to make chimeric proteins in which the Fv of an antibody, preferentially binding to a cancer cell, is attached to a potent bacterial toxin.

Additionally, with his colleague Jesse Roth, he was the first to clearly demonstrate the presence of specific protein receptors on the surface of animal cells. To explain the biochemical basis of hyperthyroidism, Pastan showed that antibodies from the serum of patients with hyperthyroidism specifically activated thyroid gland adenylate cyclase, providing an immunological mechanism for hyperthyroidism. He then proceeded to study hormone interactions with living cells using fluorescence photo-bleaching to visualize polypeptide hormone-receptor complexes bound to the membrane of living cells. He showed these complexes were highly mobile and clustered before entry into cells, and measured their lateral diffusion coefficients. In collaboration with Mark Willingham, he developed and used video intensified microscopy to visualize fluorescently labeled insulin and EGF forming clusters on the surface of living cells prior to entry through the endocytic pathway. These studies identified the pathway by which growth factors enter cells and established a mechanism that helped explain down-regulation of receptors and the loss of growth factor responsiveness.

Following the identification of the EGF receptor by Stanley Cohen, Pastan and colleagues made several seminal advances that identified the EGF receptor as a proto-oncogene. Besides being one of the first 3 laboratories to obtain the DNA sequence of the EGF receptor, they showed that the EGF receptor gene was amplified, rearranged and over-expressed in many cancer cells including squamous cell carcinomas, and with Doug Lowy showed that over-expression of the EGF receptor in the presence of EGF is sufficient to transform normal 3T3 cells and therefore is a proto-oncogene. Altogether these studies provided much of the framework that ultimately led to the use of antibodies targeted to the EGF receptor as a cancer therapy.

Pastan is currently developing a new therapy for cancer by making fusion proteins composed of the Fv portion of monoclonal antibodies directed at receptor proteins on cancer cells fused to a genetically modified form of a powerful bacterial toxin, Pseudomonas exotoxin A. Three of these genetically engineered proteins, which he named recombinant immunotoxins (RITs), are being tested in humans with various forms of cancer. One of these, HA22 or Moxetumomab pasudotox (Moxe), targets CD22 on B cell malignancies; it has produced many complete and durable remissions in chemotherapy resistant Hairy cell leukemia and is now in a phase 3 trial to gain FDA approval. Moxe also produced complete remissions in children with drug resistant Acute Lymphoblastic Leukemia and is being developed for the treatment of that disease.

Another immunotoxin, SS1P, targets the mesothelin antigen. Mesothelin was discovered by Pastan and his colleague Mark Willingham and is a promising target for cancer immunotherapy, because it is expressed on many cancers: mesothelioma, ovarian, lung, pancreatic stomach cancers and cholangiocarcinoma, but not on essential organs. SS1P has shown anti-tumor activity in a phase I trial when combined with chemotherapy. In a recently completed clinical trial, SS1P was combined with the immunosuppressive drugs cyclophosphamide and pentostatin and produced remarkable major and sustained tumor regressions lasting up to 2 years in patients with advanced chemotherapy resistant mesothelioma. Tumor shrinkage of this magnitude and duration has never before been observed in mesothelioma.

Pastan’s current efforts are directed at improving the activity and usefulness of immunotoxins he has developed. One of the major obstacles to the success of RIT therapy is that antibodies often form and neutralize the RIT preventing additional treatment cycles. Pastan has developed methods to make active RITs in which the major B cell and T cell epitopes have been identified and silenced. An RIT with reduced immunogenicity that targets mesothelin expressing cancers is being prepared for clinical trials to begin in 2014.

== Awards ==
- Van Meter Prize, 1971
- G. Burroughs Mider Lectureship, National Institutes of Health, 1973
- Membership, National Academy of Sciences, 1982
- American Academy of Arts and Sciences, 1997
- Fellow, American Academy of Microbiology, 1997
- Fellow, American Association for the Advancement of Science, 1997
- International Feltrinelli Prize for Medicine, 2009
- Nathan Davis Award for Outstanding Government Service from the American Medical Association, 2010
- Membership, Institute of Medicine of the National Academies, 2010
- 2020 Winner - Samuel J. Heyman Service to America Medalist, Paul A. Volcker Career Achievement.
