= Grand Canyon Conservancy =

Non-profit organization

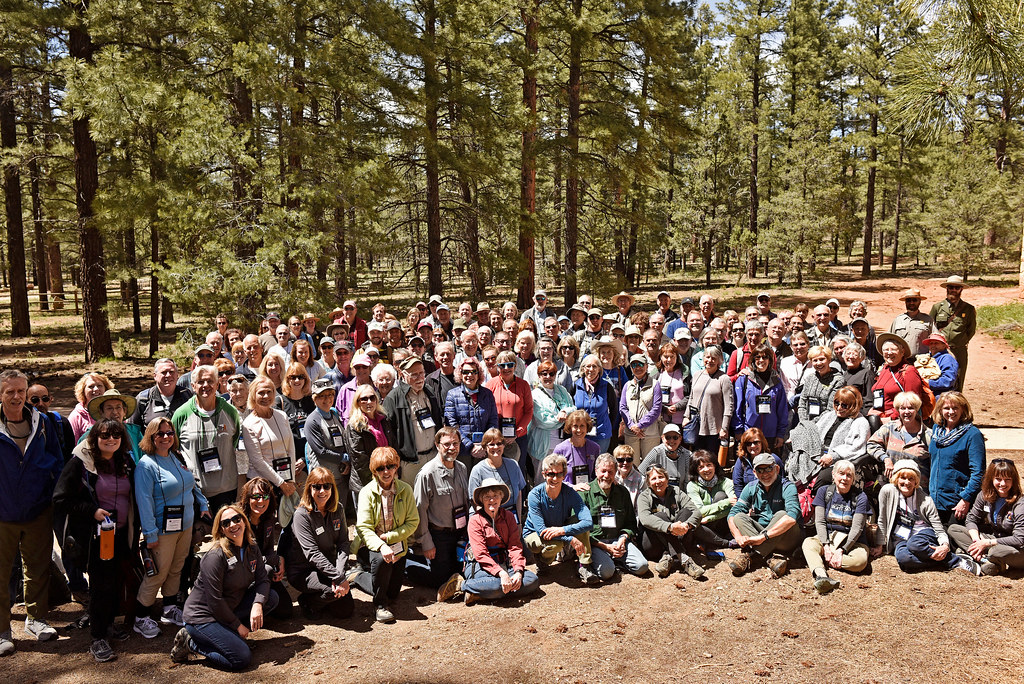
- Grand Canyon Conservancy Supporters at Grand Gathering 2019
- Predecessor: Grand Canyon Natural History Association
- Formation: 1932; 94 years ago
- Founder: Edwin “Eddie” McKee
- Founded at: Grand Canyon National Park
- Type: 501(c)(3) nonprofit
- Registration no.: EIN #86-0179548
- Headquarters: Grand Canyon Village, Arizona
- Website: www.grandcanyon.org

Grand Canyon Conservancy, formerly known as Grand Canyon Association, is the National Park Service's official non-profit partner of Grand Canyon National Park, raising private funds, operating retail shops within the park, and providing premier guided educational programs about the natural and cultural history of the region. Supporters fund projects including trails and historic building preservation, educational programs for the public, and the protection of wildlife and their natural habitat.

== History ==
Grand Canyon Conservancy was founded in 1932 as the Grand Canyon Natural History Association by naturalist Edwin "Eddie" McKee. A ranger working on the South Rim of Grand Canyon National Park, McKee saw the need for a park partner that would support interpretive programs and publications about the canyon, and from its beginnings the natural history association did just that, funding interpretive talks, research, and scientific papers. In 1937, the GCNHA was legally established as a cooperating association, a private, nonprofit organization whose mission was to support the education and preservation programs of federally protected lands. The purpose of the GCNHA was "to stimulate and encourage scientific research and investigation in the field of geology, botany, zoology, ethnology, archaeology, and related subjects in the Grand Canyon region."

In October 1994, the conservancy's board of directors approved changing the name of the association from the Grand Canyon Natural History Association to Grand Canyon Association, in part to emphasize an expanding list of services, books, and products focusing on cultural history, thus not always fitting the bill of "natural history."

Today, Grand Canyon Conservancy still serves its founding mission. Membership, general-audience publications, educational outreach, a field institute, and philanthropy programs were added over the years to serve the association's mission of cultivating support, education, and understanding of Grand Canyon.

== Grand Canyon Conservancy Field Institute ==
The Grand Canyon Conservancy Field Institute was founded in 1993 to support the Grand Canyon National Park's efforts to offer educational and interpretive services. The Field Institute offers over 360 guided hiking, art classes backpacking and river rafting tours and classes at Grand Canyon National Park annually.

The Canyon Field School is a collaborative program between Grand Canyon National Park Service, Grand Canyon Conservancy Field Institute, Arizona Public Service (APS), The McCain Institute, and the Udall Foundation to expand youth education programs at Grand Canyon National Park. Through this program, hundreds of youth will have an opportunity to discover, explore, and learn about by participating in outdoor experiences.

== Grand Canyon Artist-in-Residence Program ==
Grand Canyon Conservancy's Artist in Residence program hosts individual artists from around the world who wish to engage with Grand Canyon National Park and its people during a three-to-ten-week residency at the South Rim in Arizona. The program is designed to support artists with a well-developed body of work that engages contemporary themes, especially those tied to conservation, cultural identity, and community. The Grand Canyon Conservancy took over operations of the artist in residence program starting in 2020 but the history of the program goes back to the 20th century.

Notable Artists-in-Residence have included:

- Wilbur Niewald (painter, 1972)

== Grand Canyon Astronomer-in-Residence Program ==
The Astronomer-in-Residence Program at Grand Canyon National Park began in 2021 and offers astronomers, both amateur and professional; educators, scientists, visual and performing artists, and writers, the opportunity to practice and share their discipline under one of the most pristine night skies in the United States. Previous Astronomers-in-Residence have included:

- Dean Regas
- Lauren Camp

== Projects ==
=== Completed Projects ===
Grand Canyon Conservancy has helped to fund and execute a variety of projects within the park. Recent projects include:

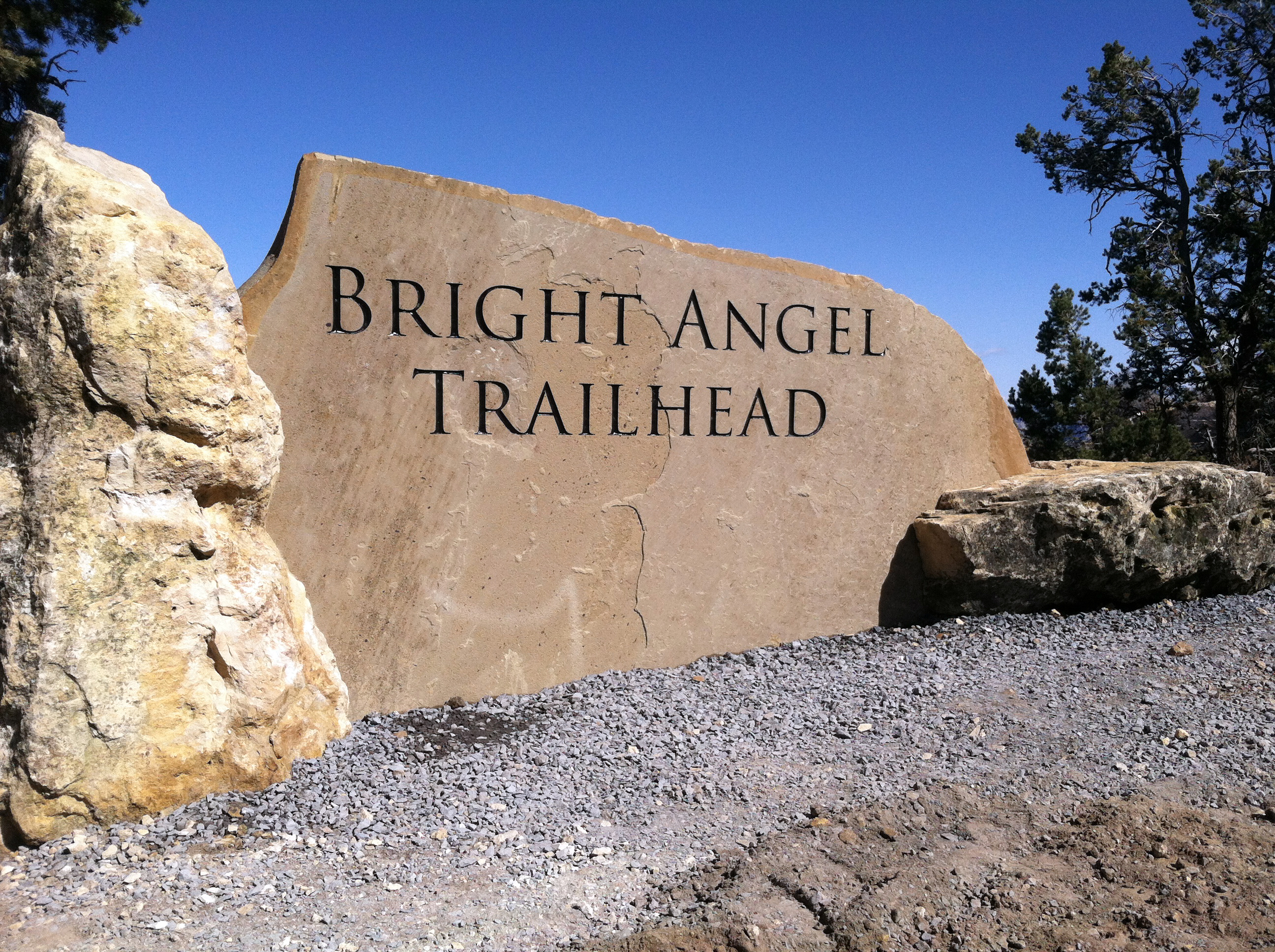
The new Bright Angel Trailhead sign, installed as part of the renovations.

==== Bright Angel Trailhead ====
- The Bright Angel Trail is one of the oldest and most popular trails at Grand Canyon National Park. Grand Canyon Conservancy supporters contributed to restore the plaza and add visitor amenities. The new trailhead opened May 8, 2013 and now features:
  - Meeting plaza with new shade structures, benches, and a water filling station
  - Reconstruction of important stone retaining walls along the trailhead and new landscaping with native plants
  - Permanent restrooms with flushing toilets
  - A new paved parking lot
  - Wheelchair-accessible routes along the Rim Trail between Hermits Rest shuttle bus stop and the Kolb Studio

==== Kolb Studio renovation ====
- Grand Canyon Conservancy received a $100,000 grant from American Express to help fund the restoration of the former home and photography studio of Ellsworth and Emery Kolb, early Grand Canyon entrepreneurs.
  - The project rectified structural and safety issues; addressing drainage problems, repairing and replacing retaining walls, stabilizing entryways, and replacing exterior features and structural beams
  - The studio was originally constructed in 1904 and was rededicated May 16, 2014
  - Historic Kolb Studio is open year-round and contains an exhibit venue, bookstore, and information center operated by Grand Canyon Conservancy.

==== Mather Point Amphitheatre ====
- Grand Canyon Conservancy donors funded the construction of a new rim-side amphitheatre for ranger programs. The amphitheatre was dedicated October 25, 2010.
  - The amphitheatre was built using native limestone and provides seating overlooking Colorado River, Zoroaster Temple, and Bright Angel Canyon.
  - A medallion was carved into the stone walkway that leads to the rim and Mather Point. A large circular shape, the medallion contains the name and symbols that represent 11 tribes.
  - In addition to Mather Point, the South Entrance Road was realigned, a bus transit center was built, and additional parking for private and commercial vehicles was added.

==== Greenhouse ====
- Grand Canyon National Park is committed to maintaining a native habitat for our vegetation, wildlife, endangered species, and water resources.
  - Project included supporter-funded construction of a high-capacity, energy-efficient greenhouse
  - After construction, the park's vegetation crews can now grow double the number of plants to support ecology restoration projects at the rim and along the river
  - Supporters and volunteers continue to assist with greenhouse operations by gathering seeds and cuttings and helping to maintain native habitat throughout the park.

=== A Grand Vision Campaign ===
A Grand Vision is Grand Canyon Conservancy and National Park Services' strategic vision for improvements at the park. The campaign will celebrate Grand Canyon's Centennial in 2019. The projects listed below are the priorities of the campaign.

==== Grand Canyon Trail Restoration ====
Supporter funded trail restoration has been an ongoing priority for Grand Canyon Conservancy, already completely restoring multiple trails. Completed restoration efforts include:

- Clear Creek Trail, built in the 1930s by the Civilian Conservation Corps so visitors at Phantom Ranch could hike scenic side canyons, which has been stabilized for improved hiker safety and enjoyment
- Grandview Trail, built in the late 1880s to haul raw ore to the canyon rim, where overgrown vegetation was removed, and historic stonework was rebuilt.
- Hermit Trail, where trail crews recently completed work on upper portions of the trail.

Because trail restoration is so challenging, it is estimated that a single mile of trail restoration work costs $250,000. Mules haul equipment and materials to work sites and often the trail crews only tools are pickaxes and shovels.

A Grand Vision Campaign hopes to establish a Trails Forever endowment which will support a full season of Youth Conservation Corps workers dedicated to trail restoration and will allow the park to plan a comprehensive program for trail restoration.

==== Desert View Intertribal Heritage Site ====
Desert View Watchtower was designed by Mary Colter in the 1930s. Grand Canyon Conservancy, the National Park Service and the Inter-tribal Advisory Council plan to transform the Desert View area into a thriving space that celebrates the tribal heritages of Grand Canyon and create a visitor experience that informs visitors from around the world of the diverse cultures at Grand Canyon.

- In January 2015 National Park Service took over management of the Desert Watchtower.
- In July 2015 ArtPlace America announced a $500,000 grant to preserve murals inside the Watchtower, continue the Cultural Demonstration Series, and develop inter-tribal tourism opportunities.
- In September, 2016 America voted Desert View Watchtower among the most worthy historic preservation projects at the National Parks to receive a prestigious grant to restore the Watchtower murals.
- Funds donated towards the Desert View Heritage Site will go towards:
  - Completing restoration of the Desert View Watchtower structure and its murals.
  - Creating new spaces like a performance plaza and a cultural center to immerse visitors in American Indian life and culture.
  - Expanding tribal youth opportunities for education and job training.
  - Expansion of the popular Cultural Demonstration program at Desert View.
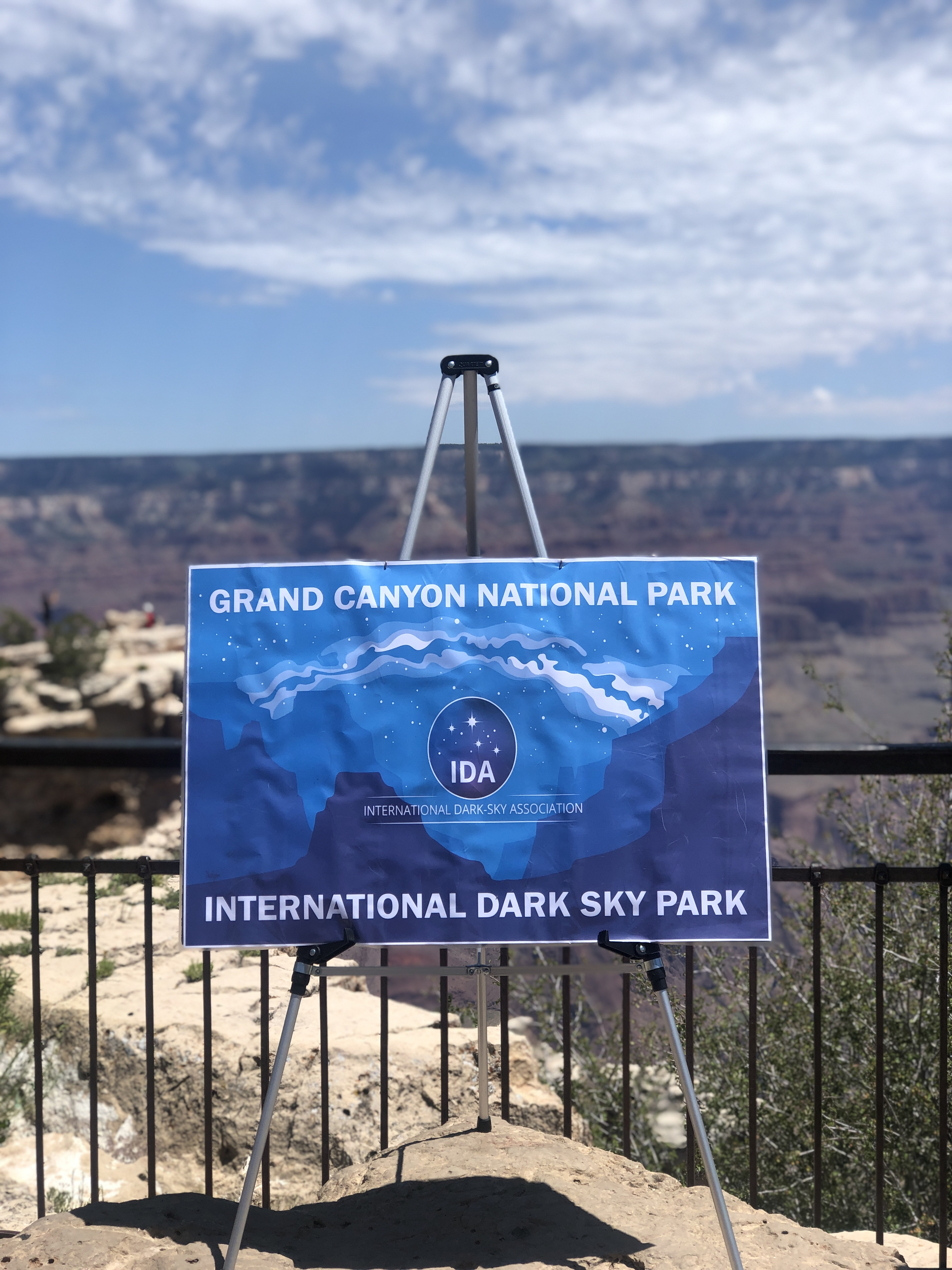
    Grand Canyon National Park became an official International Dark Sky Park in June of 2019.

==== Dark Sky Preservation ====
Grand Canyon National Park is one of the last places in the United States where one can experience a star-filled night sky. One-third of the world's population – including 80% of Americans – can no longer see the Milky Way due to light pollution.

- Funding towards Dark Sky Preservation helped Grand Canyon National Park achieve International Dark Sky Park status in June 2019.
  - All of the park's 4,740 lighting fixtures have been inventoried and catalogued. Before becoming a Dark Sky Park, 3,500 of these fixtures did not meet dark sky guidelines.
  - Light fixtures and very-low-lumen LED bulbs were tested for a wide variety of installations.
  - To achieve designation as an International Dark Sky Park, 1,500 fixtures were replaced by 2019, the Centennial year of Grand Canyon.
  - Expanded Evening Programs and new night sky viewing areas are being developed.

==== Discovery and Exploration ====
Grand Canyon Conservancy is responsible for expansive science and education programs at Grand Canyon.

- Donations towards Discovery and Exploration have already funded the following:
  - Studies of Bighorn Sheep and other animal populations that led to advances in wildlife management and species protection.
  - The restoration of habitat along the Colorado River and throughout the park for endangered plants, animals, and birds.
  - Field trips and Rangers in the Classroom environmental education programs that reach 13,500 children each year.
  - A new Greenhouse that doubles our capacity to grow native plants to restore park habitat.

32,000 new Junior Rangers. Children complete a series of activities during their park visit and are then sworn to protect the park

- The Centennial campaign aims to fund further efforts to discover and educate including:
  - Kids at the Canyon. An expansion of Grand Canyon Conservancy's popular education and classroom programs to bring nature and science to students who may have never visited a national park.
  - Springs and Seeps Hydrology Study. Examining flow and volume at Grand Canyon to help determine the sustainability of the water supply on the Coconino Plateau.
  - The Greater Grand Canyon Landscape Assessment. The most comprehensive study of the Colorado River basin ever performed is helping prioritize conservation issues and create new research programs at the park.
  - Youth and Ancestral Lands Conservation Corps engage young people and Native youth in meaningful, seasonal work on trails, historic structures, restoring native plant species, and interpretation and education.

== Publishing ==
Grand Canyon Conservancy publishes on average three to five books annually. Topics of their books include original research on Grand Canyon natural history, geology, wildlife, archaeology, American Indian history and culture, pioneer history, and hiking and include historic photographs, maps, charts, and illustrations.

In association with the Grand Canyon National Park, the conservancy publishes a supporter magazine, Canyon Views on a seasonal basis.

In 1995, the Association published the Eco-Squad edutainment comic book series under the label "Canyon Comics". The story centers around a team of environmentally-themed superheroes assembled by Mother Earth and granted powers. The series contained lessons related to Grand Canyon science, history, and safety. It lasted four issues.

== Supporters ==
Grand Canyon Conservancy has an active supporter program. Supporters have always been an essential part of Grand Canyon Conservancy and include those who participate in monthly giving, annual supporters, and Grand Guardians, a dedicated group of sustainers with an annual gift of $1,000 or more.

Supporter contributions have an impact by supporting restoration of world-renowned trails and historic buildings, funding wildlife and habitat preservation, and helping educate the next generation of park stewards.
