= Michael Collier (poet) =

American writer and academic

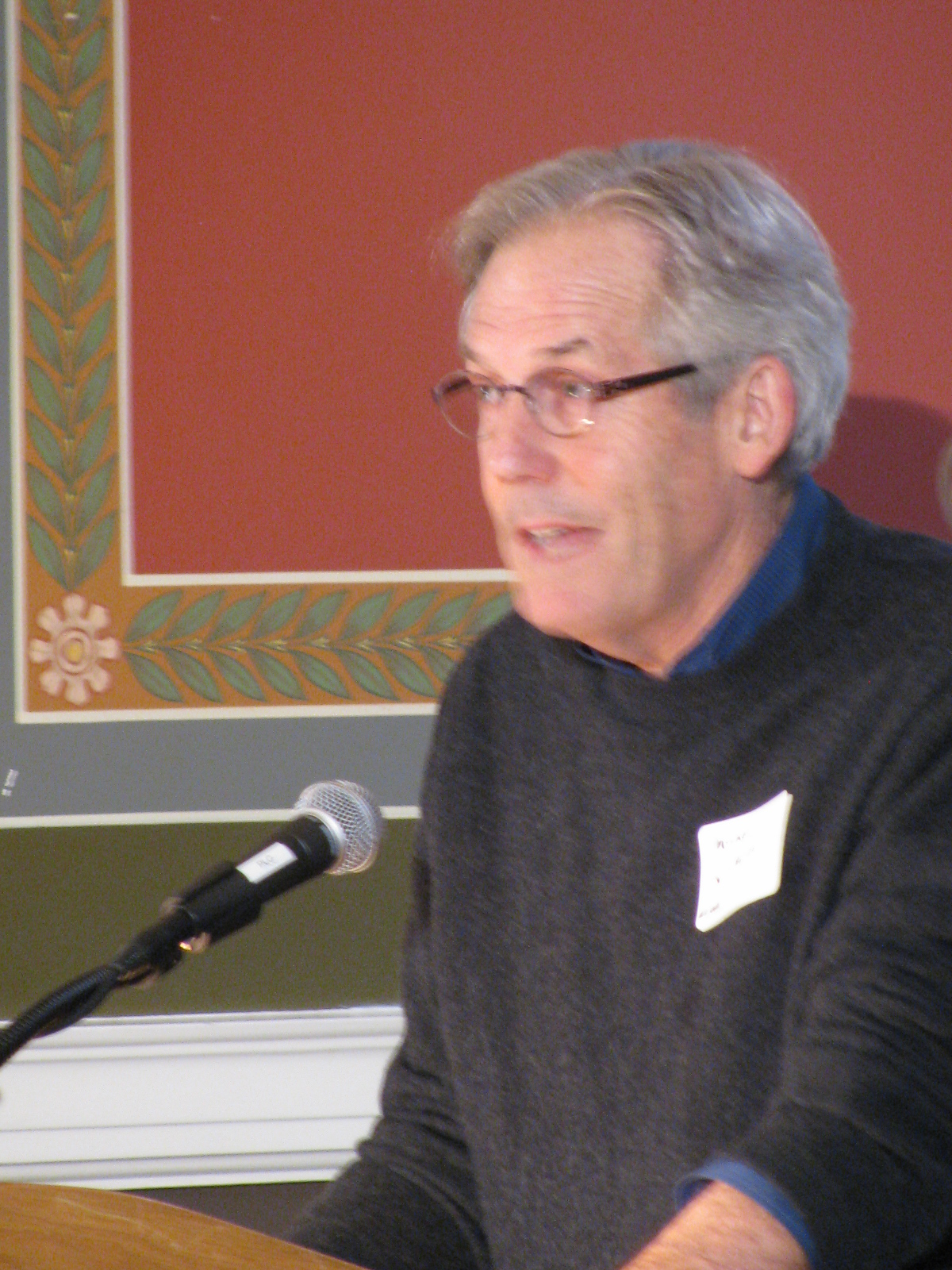
- Born: 1953 (age 72–73); Phoenix, Arizona, U.S.
- Education: Connecticut College (BA); University of Arizona (MFA)
- Writing career
- Genre: Poetry
- Notable awards: Poet Laureate of Maryland

Michael Robert Collier (born 1953) is an American poet, teacher, creative writing program administrator and editor. He has published five books of original poetry, a translation of Euripides' Medea, a book of prose pieces about poetry, and has edited three anthologies of poetry. From 2001 to 2004 he was the Poet Laureate of Maryland. From 1994 - 2017 he was the director of the Bread Loaf Writers' Conference. He is a professor emeritus of English at the University of Maryland, College Park and was the poetry editorial consultant for Houghton Mifflin (now Houghton Mifflin Harcourt).

== Life ==
Collier was born in Phoenix, Arizona and graduated from Brophy College Preparatory in 1971. He attended the Santa Clara University for one year, then transferred to Connecticut College in 1973 to study with the Pulitzer prize-winning poet William Morris Meredith, Jr. In 1977, he moved to London on a Thomas Watson fellowship and worked with editor William Cookson on the British literary magazine Agenda. After graduating cum laude from Connecticut College in 1976, and receiving his M.F.A. in creative writing from the University of Arizona in 1979, he was a writing fellow at the Fine Arts Work Center in Provincetown, Massachusetts, from 1979 to 1980. He moved to the Washington, D.C., area in 1981, where he began teaching part-time at George Mason University, Trinity College and the University of Maryland, College Park.

From 1983 to 1984, Collier was the coordinator of public relations and the poetry program at the Folger Shakespeare Library. In 1984, he was appointed full-time to the English faculty at the University of Maryland. In the summer of 1981, he attended the Bread Loaf Writers' Conference for the first time as the Margaret Bridgman Scholar in Poetry, followed by stints as a fellow in 1986, and as associate faculty in 1992 and 1993. In 1994, the trustees of Middlebury College appointed him Director of the Bread Loaf Writers' Conference. Founded in 1926, the Bread Loaf Writers' Conference is the longest-running writers' conference in the United States. In 2002, Houghton-Mifflin Publishers appointed Collier as its editorial consultant for poetry. He has edited books by the American poets Michael Ryan, Spencer Reece, and Alan Shapiro and the British poet Glyn Maxwell, as well as the books Native Guard by Natasha Trethewey which won the 2007 Pulitzer Prize and Space Walk by Tom Sleigh, which won the 2008 $100,000 Kingsley Tufts award from Claremont Graduate University. From 2001 to 2004, Collier served as the Maryland state poet laureate. He was a 2021 James Merrill House Fellow in Stonington, CT.

He is married and has two sons.

== Work and artistic influences ==
Collier's poems often reveal a fascination with objects and their significance. In a 2005 interview, Collier stated that he has "always been drawn to more formal poets like Robert Frost" and continued by saying that other "early influences included Anthony Hecht and early Robert Lowell…and W.H. Auden, Philip Larkin." He added "I strongly identify with Philip Larkin, Thomas Hardy, Randall Jarrell, and George Herbert."

== Bibliography ==
=== Poetry ===
Collections

- Dark Wild Realm, Houghton Mifflin, 2006. (Paperback edition, Mariner Books, Houghton Mifflin, October 2007 ISBN 978-0-618-91991-8) ISBN 978-0-618-58222-8
- The Ledge, Houghton Mifflin, 2000. (Paperback edition, Mariner Books, Houghton Mifflin, April 2002 ISBN 978-0-618-21910-0) ISBN 978-0-618-05014-7
- The Neighbor, University of Chicago Press, 1995; 2nd printing 1996; 3rd printing, 1999. ISBN 978-0-226-11358-6
- The Folded Heart, Wesleyan University Press, 1989. ISBN 978-0-8195-1171-3
- The Clasp and Other Poems, Wesleyan University Press, 1986 (Second printing, 1987).
- My Bishop and Other Poems, University of Chicago Press, 2018

Anthologies (edited)

- The New American Poets: A Bread Loaf Anthology, ed. Michael Collier, University Press of New England, 2000.
- The New Bread Loaf Anthology of Contemporary American Poetry, eds. Michael Collier and Stanley Plumly, University Press of New England, 1999; second printing, 2000.
- The Wesleyan Tradition: Four Decades of American Poetry, Wesleyan University Press, 1993 (Second printing, 1995).

List of poems

Title	Year	First published	Reprinted/collected
Embrace	2009	"Embrace". The Atlantic. June 2009.	
Goat on a pile of scrap lumber	2014	"Goat on a pile of scrap lumber". The Atlantic. 321 (2): 61. March 2018.	

=== Prose and translation ===
- A William Maxwell Portrait: Appreciations and Memories, edited with Charles Baxter and Edward Hirsch, W.W. Norton, Inc. (W.W. Norton, 2004). ISBN 978-0-393-05771-3
- Medea, translated by Michael Collier. Introduction and notes by Georgia Machemer. Oxford University Press, 2006. ISBN 978-0-19-514566-3
- Make Us Wave Back: Essays on Poetry and Influence, University of Michigan Press, 2007. ISBN 978-0-472-09947-4

== Awards ==
- Finalist, National Book Critics Circle Award in Poetry, 2001 for The Ledge.
- Finalist, Los Angeles Times Book Prize for Poetry, 2001 for The Ledge.
- John Simon Guggenheim Memorial Foundation Fellowship, 1995
- National Endowment for the Arts Creative Writing Fellowship, 1994 and 1984.
- National Endowment for the Arts Creative Writing Fellowship, 1984.
- "Discovery" The Nation Award, 1981.
- Margaret Bridgman Scholar in Poetry, Bread Loaf Writers' Conference, 1981.
- Writing Fellow, Fine Arts Work Center in Provincetown, 1979–80.
- Thomas Watson Traveling Fellowship, 1976
