= Michael Glaser =

American poet (born 1943)

Michael S. Glaser
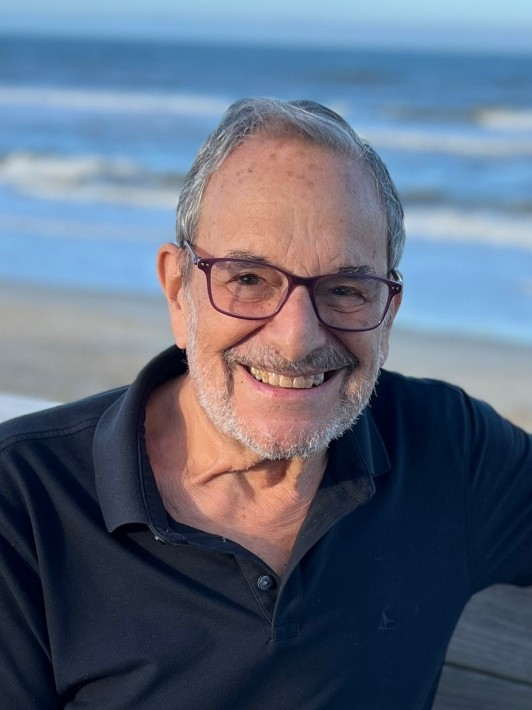
- Born: March 20, 1943; Chicago, Illinois, U.S.
- Died: January 24, 2025 (aged 81); Hillsborough, North Carolina, U.S.
- Education: PhD in English, Kent State University, 1971
- Occupations: Poet, educator
- Years active: 1960s – 2025
- Title: Poet Laureate of the State of Maryland
- Spouses: 2, Kathleen W. (m. 1976)
- Children: 5
- Awards: Andrew White Medal, Homer Dodge Endowed Award for Excellence in Teaching, Columbia Merit Award, Individual Artist Award for poetry
- Writing career
- Period: Late 20th and early 21st centuries
- Website: michaelsglaser.com

Michael S. Glaser (March 20, 1943 - January 24, 2025) was an American poet and educator who served as Poet Laureate of Maryland from 2004 to 2009. He was also an advocate for women's rights and health, affordable housing, fatherhood, and writing and arts education in public schools.

== Early life and education ==
Michael Schmidt Glaser was born in Chicago, Illinois in 1943. His father, Milton A. Glaser, was a chemist who had served in World War II. His mother, born Rona Schmidt, was a philosopher. Glaser is Jewish and is of Russian, Polish and German ancestry.

Glaser graduated from Denison University in Ohio in 1965 with a B.A. and from Kent State University in 1967 with a M.A. in English and a PhD in English in 1971. He was a teaching fellow at Kent State until 1970. While there, Glaser was involved with Students for a Democratic Society, anti-war protests and civil rights activism. Glaser did postdoctoral studies at the University of California at San Diego from 1974 to 1975.

Glaser was on campus on May 4, 1970, when the Ohio National Guard opened fire on student protesters in the Kent State Shootings, killing 4 people and injuring 9. Glaser saw the soldiers turn and fire on the protestors. Years later, while being interviewed by a reporter from the Southern Maryland News, said that he could not believe that it was real at first. As he ran from the soldiers, he said, "I was sure they were blanks. We were all sure they were blanks." After the shootings Glaser, who was a member of the American Civil Liberties Union, took testimonies from witnesses to the killings. He described the experience as being "a wake up call" for him.

== Career ==
Glaser began teaching at St. Mary's College of Maryland as a professor of English in the fall of 1970. Later, he served as head of the Division of Arts and Letters, and chair of the English department at St. Mary's College of Maryland, where he co-founded and directed the bi-annual Literary Festival and the annual Voices reading series For over 20 years, he has served as the Maryland State Arts Council poet-in-the-schools. And he served twice as a guest artist at the Maryland Artist and Teacher's Institute. After 38 years of teaching he retired and became a professor emeritus in 2008. After retirement, Glaser remained an active public speaker.

Glaser was appointed Poet Laureate of the State of Maryland on August 2, 2004, by Governor Robert L. Ehrlich Jr. He served in that capacity until 2009. After accepting the post of Maryland's poet laureate, Glaser used the unpaid opportunity to work with teachers around the state to promote the inclusion of more poetry in the classroom.

Glaser wrote poetry for over 55 years, and has published over 500 poems in literary journals, newspapers and many anthologies. He has published several books of poetry and many chapbooks. He has edited books of poetry, including the posthumous works of his friend and colleague Lucille Clifton.

Glaser was a widely sought speaker and workshop leader.

== Personal life ==
Glaser married twice; he had three sons from his first marriage and two daughters from his second marriage. He lived in North Carolina with his wife, Kathleen W., an educator, and all of his children are grown. Glaser had twelve grandchildren.

Glaser was a feminist. He served on the Board of the St. Mary's Women's Center and on the St. Mary's County Housing Board which oversees low income housing in the county. Glaser was elected to the board of directors for the Maryland Humanities Council where he served a three-year term.

Glaser expressed concerns about insufficient civil rights and opportunities in St. Mary's County for its African American residents. When asked what his political beliefs are he has responded, "Kindness."

Glaser's hobbies were gardening, hiking and travel.

Glaser was a friend and former colleague of the American poet, Judith Hall and they collaborated on writing education projects in Maryland in the 1980s.

He died unexpectedly "peacefully in his sleep", on January 24, 2025, according to a post on his own Facebook account, made by his family.

== Awards ==
Glaser was a recipient of the Homer Dodge Endowed Award for Excellence in Teaching, the Columbia Merit Award from the Poetry Committee of the Greater Washington, D.C. area for his service to poetry, the Andrew White Medal for contributions to the intellectual and artistic life in Maryland, Individual Artist Award for poetry, Maryland State Arts Council, 1997; and the Faculty student life award, St. Mary's College of Maryland, 1992; His book, Men's Room and Other Poems, won the 1996 Painted Bride Quarterly chapbook competition.

Named Poet Laureate for the State of Maryland, 2004.

Glaser edited four collections of poetry and published seven volumes of his own poems, including the award-winning chapbooks Fire Before the Hands and Disrupting Consensus.

== Works ==
=== Poetry ===
"To me, part of the revision process is that this poem on the page has its own life. How do I honor that? You think of it almost like, and this might be a very dangerous analogy, raising children. You hold an infant in your hand and that child is totally dependent on you. And the whole rest of your life is the process of letting go and then honoring the otherness of your child — if you're good and lucky."
Michael Glaser

- A Lover's Eye (The Bunny & Crocodile Press, 1989)
- In the Men's Room and Other Poems, which was the winner of the 1996 Painted Bride Quarterly chapbook competition.
- "Being a Father," July, 2004
- Fire Before the Hands won the 2007 Anabiosis Press chapbook contest.
- Remembering Eden, Finishing Line Press 2008
- Disrupting Consensus was winner of the 2009–2010 Teacher's Voice chapbook competition.
- Over 500 poems appearing in other publications.

=== Editor ===
- The Cooke Book (1989)
- Weavings 2000: The Maryland Millennial Anthology
- Come Celebrate With Me: A Voices Memorial Tribute to Lucille Clifton (2011)

=== Co-editor ===
- "The Collected Poems of Lucille Clifton" (BOA Editions, 2012), with Kevin Young
