= Maryland literature =

The literature of Maryland, United States, includes fiction, poetry, and nonfiction. Representative authors include John Barth, H. L. Mencken, and Edgar Allan Poe.

== History ==
A printing press began operating in St. Mary's City, Maryland, in 1685. Colonial-era writers included George Alsop (Character of the Province of Maryland, 1666) and Poet-Laureate of Maryland Ebenezer Cooke (Sot-Weed Factor, 1708), described by Encyclopedia of Southern Culture as "an early and exceptional example of the satiric mode so generally characteristic of Maryland's literary tradition. The Adventures of Alonso, (1775) is proposed to be one of the first novels published by an American author, identified as a "native of Maryland." Another early Maryland author was Mason Locke Weems, the author of The Life and Memorable Actions of George Washington, the source of the legend of Washington's chopping down a cherry tree.

Following the War of 1812, Baltimore was "the literary and publishing center of the country" and home to author Timothy Shay Arthur, who published over a hundred novels in his lifetime, including Ten Nights in a Bar-Room (1854) which sold nearly half a million copies.

Literary figures of the antebellum period included John Pendleton Kennedy (Swallow Barn, 1832); Edward Coote Pinkney (1802-1828). And most notably, Edgar Allan Poe of Baltimore, whom John Pendelton Kennedy supported financially for years.

== Awards and events ==
The Maryland General Assembly created the position of Poet Laureate of Maryland in 1959. The Baltimore Book Festival began around 1996.

== See also ==
- Category:Writers from Maryland
- List of newspapers in Maryland
- Category:Maryland in fiction
- Category:Libraries in Maryland
- Southern United States literature
- American literary regionalism

== Bibliography ==
- Henry Elliot Shepherd (1911). Representative Authors of Maryland. New York: Whitehall Publishing Company.
- Lucian Lamar Knight, ed. (1913). "Fifty Reading Courses: Maryland". Library of Southern Literature. Vol. 16. Atlanta: Martin and Hoyt Company. p. 198+. hdl:2027/uc1.31175034925258 – via HathiTrust.
- Elsie Dershem (1921). "Maryland". Outline of American State Literature. Lawrence, Kansas: World Company – via Internet Archive.
- Federal Writers' Project (1940). "Literature". Maryland: a Guide to the Old Line State. American Guide Series. NY: Oxford University Press. pp. 131+. hdl:2027/mdp.39015054402659.
- G. Thomas Tanselle (1971). Guide to the Study of United States Imprints. Harvard University Press. ISBN 978-0-674-36761-6. (Includes information about Maryland literature)
- Frank R. Shivers Jr. (1985). Maryland Wits & Baltimore Bards.
- K. Huntress Baldwin (2001). "Literature of Maryland". In Joseph M. Flora; Lucinda Hardwick MacKethan (eds.). Companion to Southern Literature: Themes, Genres, Places, People, Movements, and Motifs. Louisiana State University Press. pp. 472-477. ISBN 978-0-8071-2692-9.
