= Grace Cavalieri =

American poet, playwright, and radio host

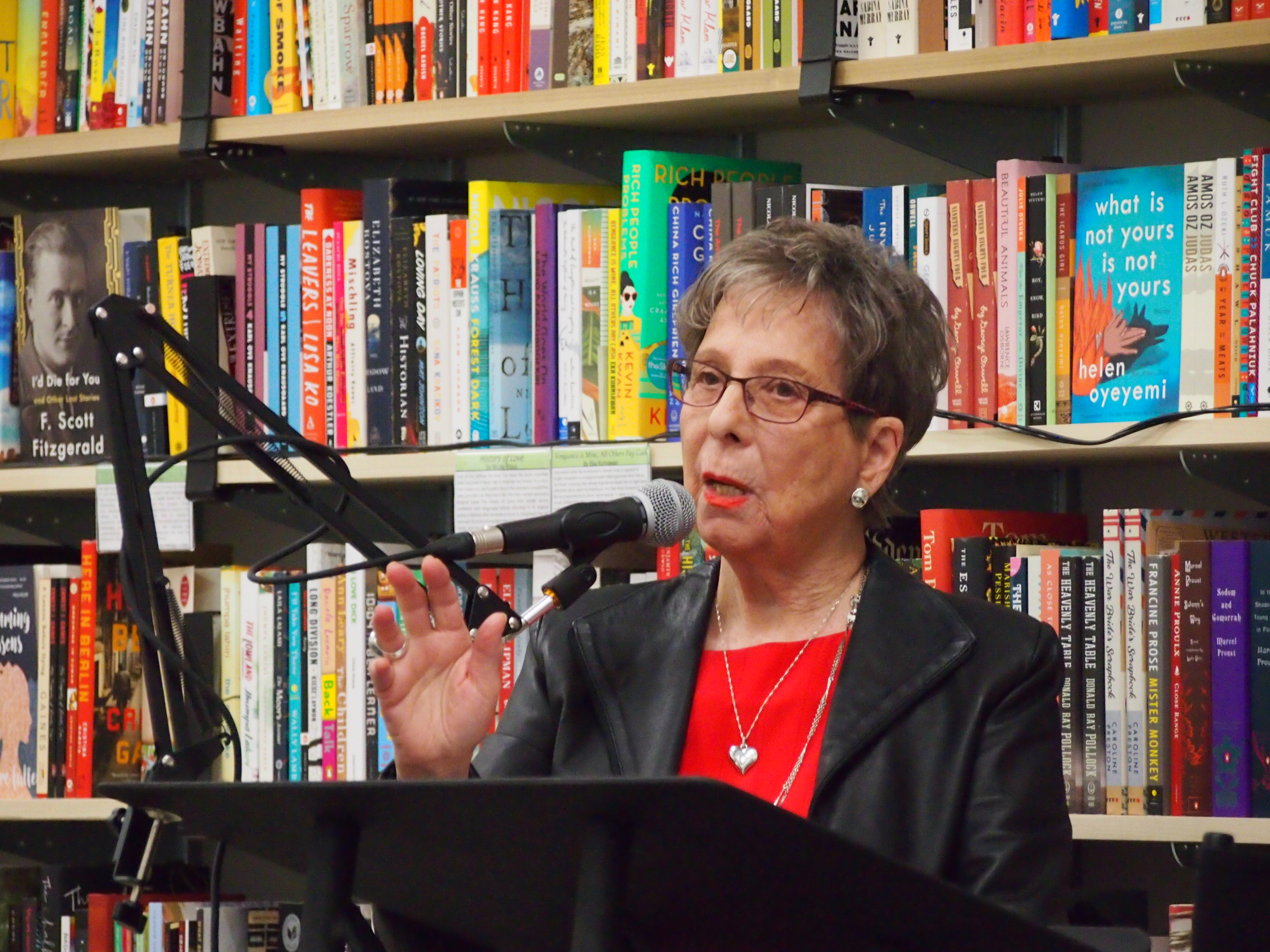
- Born: c. 1932
- Education: The College of New Jersey, Trenton; Rollins College; Goddard College
- Occupations: Poet, author, playwright
- Spouse: Kenneth Flynn (m. 1953)
- Children: 4

Grace Cavalieri (born c.1932) is an American poet, playwright, and radio host of the Library of Congress program The Poet and the Poem. In 2019, she was appointed the tenth Poet Laureate of Maryland.

== Personal life and education ==
Cavalieri earned a BS in education from The College of New Jersey, Trenton in 1954. She studied education at Rollins University, Florida in 1963 and gained an MA in creative writing and education from Goddard University, Vermont in 1975.

She married Kenneth Flynn in 1953. They had four daughters. Cavalieri lives in Annapolis, Maryland.

== Literary career ==
Cavalieri co-founded the Washington Writers Publishing House with John McNally in 1976 and served on its editorial board from 1976 to 1982. In 1979 she founded The Bunny and the Crocodile Press/Forest Woods Media Productions, a publishing house and media production company. Forest Woods Media Productions has produced The Poet and the Poem for podcasts and public radio for over 40 years.

She lectured and taught at colleges and universities throughout the United States, and was, for 25 years, visiting poet at St. Mary's College of Maryland. She was resident writer at the Word Works annual retreat in Tuscany between 1996 and 2003. She was book editor of The Montserrat Review until 2011. She wrote a monthly poetry feature entitled “Exemplars” for the Washington Independent Review of Books from 2011 to 2019.

In 2019, she was appointed the tenth Poet Laureate of Maryland.

=== Publications ===
A selection of Cavalieri's publications includes:

- Why I cannot take a lover (1975) Pub. Washington Writers
- Body Fluids (1976) Pub. Bunny and the Crocodile Press
- Swan Research (1979) Pub. Word Works
- Trenton (1990) Pub. Belle Mead Press
- Poems: New and Selected (1993) Pub. Vision Library Publications
- Migrations: Poems (1995) Pub. Vision Library Publications
- True Stories: Fiction by Uncommon Women (1997) Pub. Red Dragon Press
- Pinecrest Rest Haven (1998) Pub. Word Works
- Sounds like something I would say: Poems (2010) Pub. Goss 183
- Millie's Sunshine Tiki Villas: A Novella in Verse (2011) Pub. Goss 183
- The Man who Got Away: Poems (2014) Pub. New Academia Publishing
- The Mandate of Heaven: Select Poems (2014) Pub. Bordighera Press
- Life Upon the Wicked Stage: A Memoir (2015) Pub. New Academia Publishing
- Other Voices, Other Lives: A Grace Cavalieri collection (2017) Pub. Alan Squire Publishing
- Showboat (2019) Pub. Goss 183
- What the Psychic Said (2020) Pub. Goss 183
- Grace Art: Poems and Painting (2021) Pub. Poet's Choice Publishing
- The secret letters of Madame de Staël (2021) Pub. PoetsArtists
- The Song in the Room: Six Women Poets (2021) Pub. Forest Woods Media Productions - Compiler
- The long game: Poems Selected and New (1979 - 2022) (2023) Pub. Word Works
- Anna Nicole: Blonde Glory plus Three One-act Plays (2023) Pub. Forest Woods Media Production
- Owning the Not-So-Distant World: Poems (2024) Pub. Blue Light Press
- Fables from Italy and Beyond (2025) Pub. Bordighera Press
- I Haiku Too (2025) Pub. The Bunny and the Crocodile Press
- Today I Was Alone (2026) Pub. Mary Ellen Long

== Radio career ==
Cavalieri has had a long-term connection with public radio and public radio programming. Cavalieri and a core staff founded the non-commercial radio station WPFW-FM after being awarded a three-year National Endowment for the Arts (NEA) Radio Development Grant in 1976. Cavalieri worked for the station as Director of Arts Programming from 1976 to 1978, and as a radio producer from 1976 to 1985. She has produced more than 100 programs in radio drama, and poetry and arts criticism, including Poetry from the City, Expressions, and Writer's Workshop on the Air.

Her show, The Poet and the Poem, which typically featured poets who live in the Washington, D.C. area and have become a part of the Washington literary community, aired weekly on WPFW-FM from 1977 to 1997 and was distributed nationally through the Pacifica Radio station network. Cavalieri stopped airing the show through WPFW-FM in 1997, presenting, instead, from the Library of Congress via NPR satellite. Approximately ten episodes from the Library of Congress series are produced each season, and podcasts are made available through the Library of Congress. Cavalieri has been committed to presenting various American cultural traditions on the program and is particularly interested in the black literary community. The recordings of her programs include a significant collection of African-American poets.

Cavilieri was also an associate director of programming at the Public Broadcasting System (PBS) for five years and subsequently served as program officer of the National Endowment for the Humanities media program from 1982 to 1988.

== Awards and achievements ==
- 1977 National Endowment for the Arts grant
- 2013 George Garrett Award for Community Service to Literature "for her dedication to helping the next generation of writers find their way as artists and literary professionals".
- 2013 Co-winner, 2013 Allen Ginsberg Award for Poetry
- 2015 The Inaugural Lifetime Achievement Award from Washington Independent Review of Books
- 2015 Bordighera Press Paterson Award for Literary Excellence for The Mandate of Heaven
- 2019 The Annie Award
- 2024 Blue Light Press Publication Award for Owning the Not-So-Distant World
- The Paterson Literary Review Lifetime Achievement Award for Service to Poetry
- The Columbia Award
- The Pen-Syndicated Fiction Award
- The Paterson Poetry Prize for What I Would Do for Love: Poems in the Voice of Mary Wollstonecraft
- The Corporation for Public Broadcasting Silver Medal
- The Bordighera Poetry Prize for Water on the Sun
- The American Association of University Women
- The Paterson Award for Literary Excellence for Anna Nicole: Poems
- The Dragonfly Press Award for Outstanding Literary Achievement
- The DC Poet Laureate Special Award in Poetry
- The DC Public Humanities Award
- The West Virginia Women in Arts Award

She has received several state arts and humanities council awards and fellowships. She received the inaugural Columbia Award from the Folger Shakespeare Library Poetry Committee for "significant contribution to poetry."
