= Linda Pastan =

American poet (1932–2023)

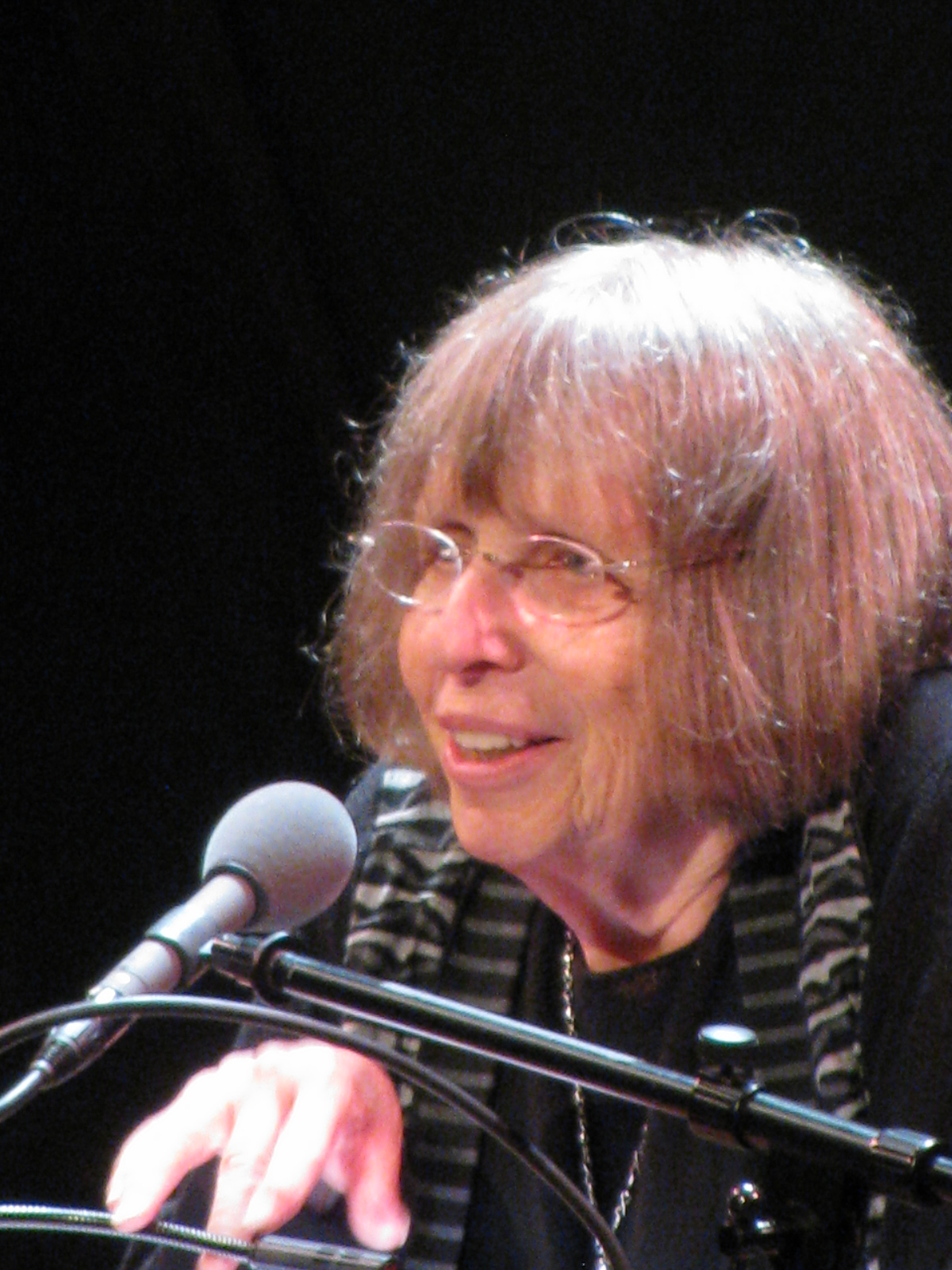
- Pastan in 2014
- Born: Linda B Olenik; May 27, 1932; The Bronx, New York, U.S.
- Died: January 30, 2023 (aged 90); Chevy Chase, Maryland, U.S.
- Education: Radcliffe College (bachelor's 1954); Simmons University (master's in library science, 1955); Brandeis University (master's in literature, 1958)
- Spouse: Ira Pastan
- Children: 3
- Writing career
- Genre: Poetry

Linda Pastan (May 27, 1932 – January 30, 2023) was a Jewish American poet. From 1991 to 1995 she was Poet Laureate of Maryland. She was known for her poems that address topics of marriage, family, and grief. Her final collection of poetry was Almost an Elegy, published in 2022.

== Early life and education ==
Linda B Olenik was born in the Bronx, New York, on May 27, 1932. Her father was a Jewish immigrant from Eastern Europe who became a surgeon. Her mother was a homemaker. An only child, she was raised in Armonk, New York. At age 12, she submitted her first poems to The New Yorker.

She received a bachelor's degree from Radcliffe College in 1954, where she received the Mademoiselle poetry prize. She received a Master of Library and Information Science from Simmons University in 1955, and a master's degree in English and American literature from Brandeis University in 1958.

== Career ==
Pastan published 15 books of poetry and a number of essays. From 1991 to 1995 she was Poet Laureate of Maryland. She was on the staff of the Bread Loaf Writers' Conference for 20 years.

Her awards include the Dylan Thomas Prize, a Pushcart Prize, the Alice Fay di Castagnola Award from the Poetry Society of America, the Bess Hokin Prize from Poetry magazine, the 1986 Maurice English Poetry Award for A Fraction of Darkness, the Charity Randall Citation from the International Poetry Forum, the 2003 Ruth Lilly Poetry Prize, the Radcliffe College Distinguished Alumnae Award, and the Virginia Faulkner Award from Prairie Schooner. Two of her poetry collections were nominated for the National Book Award and one for the Los Angeles Times Book Prize. She received fellowships from the National Endowment for the Arts and the Maryland Arts Council.

== Personal life and death ==
She married scientist Ira Pastan in 1953. The couple had three children. They lived in Potomac, Maryland, for several years. As of 2018, the Pastans lived in Chevy Chase, Maryland.

Pastan died at her home in Chevy Chase on January 30, 2023, at the age of 90, from complications following cancer surgery.

== Bibliography ==
=== Poetry collections ===
- A Perfect Circle of Sun. Chicago: Swallow Press. 1971. ISBN 9780804005531.
- On the Way to the Zoo. Illustrated by Raya Bodnarchuk. Washington: Dryad Press. 1975. OCLC 1173801.
- Aspects of Eve (1st ed.). New York: Liveright. 1975. ISBN 9780871401021.
- The Five Stages of Grief (1st ed.). New York: Norton. 1978. ISBN 9780393044898.
- Selected Poems of Linda Pastan. London: J. Murray. 1979. ISBN 9780719536694.
- Setting the Table. Illustrated by Mark Leithauser. Washington: Dryad Press. 1980. ISBN 9780931848261.
- Waiting for My Life (1st ed.). New York: Norton. 1981. ISBN 9780393000498.
- PM/AM (1st ed.). New York: Norton. 1982. ISBN 9780393300550.
- A Fraction of Darkness (1st ed.). New York: Norton. 1985. ISBN 9780393302516.
- The Imperfect Paradise (1st ed.). New York: Norton. 1988. ISBN 9780393025651.
- Heroes in Disguise (1st ed.). New York: Norton. 1991. ISBN 9780393309225.
- An Early Afterlife (1st ed.). New York: Norton. 1995. ISBN 9780393313819.
- Carnival Evening: New and Selected Poems, 1968–1998 (1st ed.). New York: Norton. 1998. ISBN 9780393046311.
- The Last Uncle (1st ed.). New York: Norton. 2002. ISBN 9780393325300.
- Queen of a Rainy Country (1st ed.). New York: Norton. 2006. ISBN 9780393331417.
- Traveling Light (1st ed.). New York: Norton. 2011. ISBN 9780393079074.
- Insomnia. New York: Norton. 2015. ISBN 9780393247183.
- A Dog Runs Through It (1st ed.). New York: Norton. 2018. ISBN 9780393651300.
- Almost an Elegy: New and Later Selected Poems (1st ed.). New York: Norton. 2022. ISBN 9781324021490.
