= Widforss Trail =

Grand Canyon hiking trail

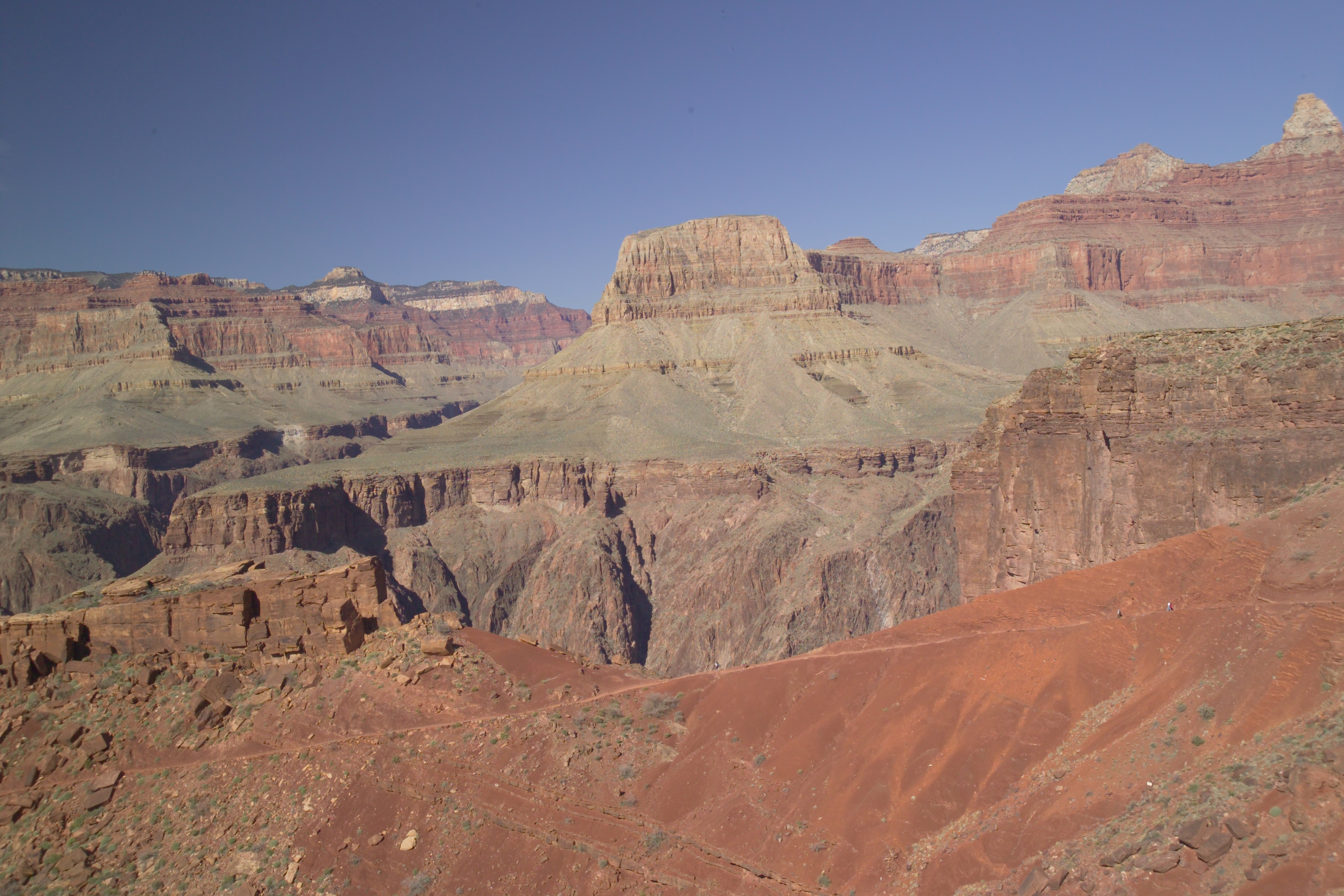
- Widforss Point, with white Coconino Sandstone Kaibab Plateau, south flank upper left of Sumner Butte, at Granite Gorge (from South Kaibab Trail, on Tonto Platform)
- Length: 4.9 mi (7.9 km)
- Location: 36.2237°N 112.0647°W Grand Canyon National Park, Arizona, United States
- Trailheads: Widforss Trailhead
- Use: Hiking
- Elevation change: 300 ft (91 m)
- Highest point: 8,380 ft (2,550 m)
- Lowest point: 8,080 ft (2,460 m)
- Difficulty: Moderate
- Season: Early Spring to Late Fall
- Sights: Grand Canyon
- Hazards: Severe Weather; Overexertion; Dehydration; Flash Flood

The Widforss Trail is a hiking trail located at the North Rim of the Grand Canyon National Park in the U.S. state of Arizona. The Widforss Trail runs from the North Rim Village through the forest to emerge at Widforss Point, a narrow, wooded promontory.

Widforss Trail was named for Gunnar Widforss, an artist specializing in American National Park landscape paintings.

== See also ==
- Grand Canyon
- List of trails in Grand Canyon National Park
