= Edwin Dinwiddie McKee =

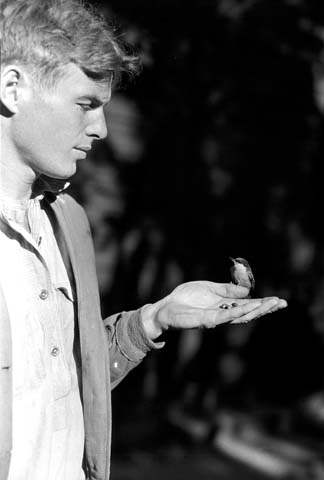
McKee at the Grand Canyon in 1929

Edwin Dinwiddie McKee (1906-1984) was an American geologist who served as president of the Society for Sedimentary Geology and was an elected fellow of the Geological Society of America. He is best known for his research of the Grand Canyon. McKee became a fellow of the American Association for the Advancement of Science in 1961.
