= Kolb Studio =

Art gallery in the Grand Canyon

Coordinates: 36.0580°N 112.1426°W

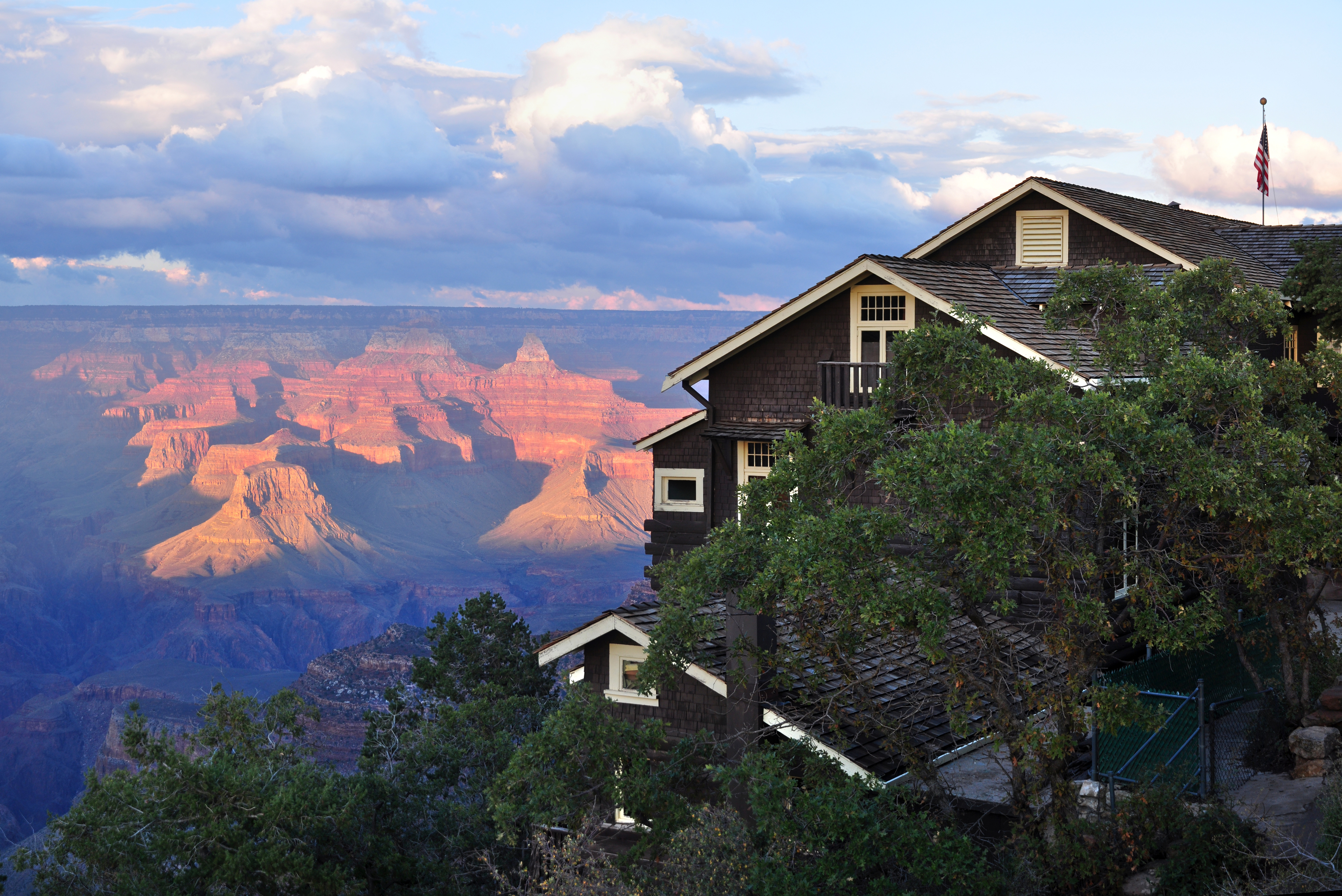
Kolb Studio overlooking the Grand Canyon

The Kolb Studio is a historic structure situated on the edge of the South Rim of the Grand Canyon in Grand Canyon Village within Grand Canyon National Park in Arizona. It was operated from 1904 until 1976 as the photographic studio of brothers Ellsworth and Emery Kolb.

== History ==
In 1902, Emery C. Kolb (1881–1976) and Ellsworth L. Kolb (1876–1960) first arrived at the south rim of the Grand Canyon. In 1911, they successfully navigated the Colorado River, filming their journey. Built between 1904 and 1926, the building they constructed was both a family home and photographic studio for the pioneering Kolb brothers. The building has evolved through two major additions and countless minor changes during its century of existence at Grand Canyon.

After the death of Emery Kolb in 1976, the National Park Service acquired the historic studio. During the 1990s, the Grand Canyon Association renovated the building and converted it to its current state. The Grand Canyon Association now operates an art gallery, bookstore, and information center inside the building. The bookstore's proceeds go to support the building, and the store features a tribute to the Kolbs’ photographs of mule riders at Grand Canyon. The start of the Bright Angel Trail is to the west of the Kolb Studio.

=== Restoration project ===
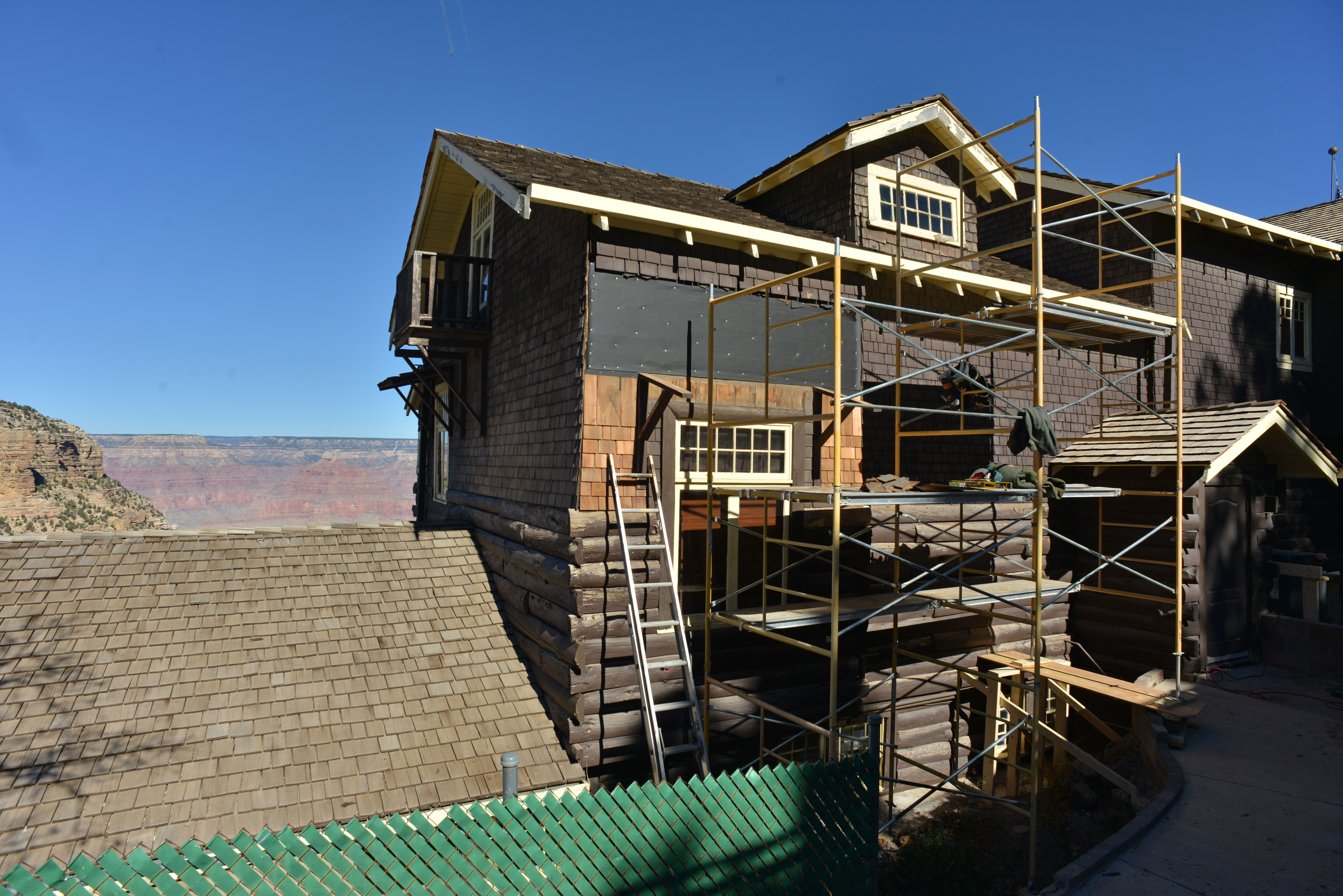
Restoration work

During 2013 and 2014, the Grand Canyon Association was in the process of restoring and rehabilitating this significant building. Work includes addressing the structural degradation of Kolb Studio.

a) rectifying drainage problems from public sidewalks and corresponding retaining walls,
b) stabilizing the concrete entranceway to assure safe continuing access to the facility
c) repairing and replacing exterior building features (e.g., log and shingle siding, structural beams, gutters, wooden porches) in order to assure long-term structural integrity of the building and
d) protecting restored exterior surfaces with paints, sealants, and other coatings.

== See also ==
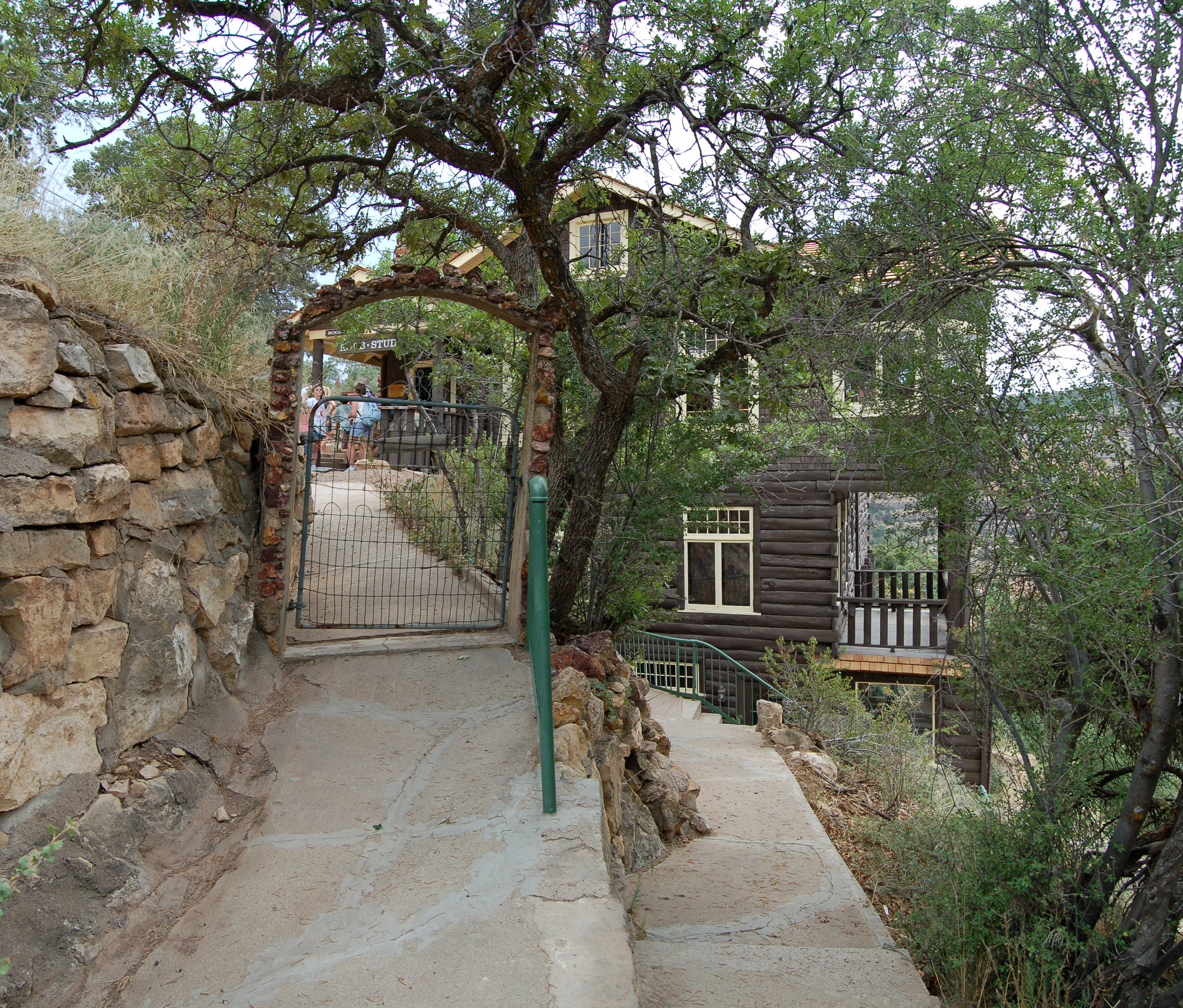
Walkway to lower terrace

- Buildings and structures in Grand Canyon National Park
- National Register of Historic Places listings in Grand Canyon National Park
- Rustic architecture in Arizona

== Other sources ==
- William C Suran (1991) The Kolb Brothers of Grand Canyon (Gem Guides Book Company) ISBN 9780938216384

== Related reading ==
- Ellsworth Leonardson Kolb (2003) The brave ones : the journals and letters of the 1911–1912 expedition down the Green and Colorado Rivers by Ellsworth L. Kolb and Emery C. Kolb (Flagstaff, AZ: Fretwater Press) ISBN 1892327120
