= History of the Grand Canyon area =

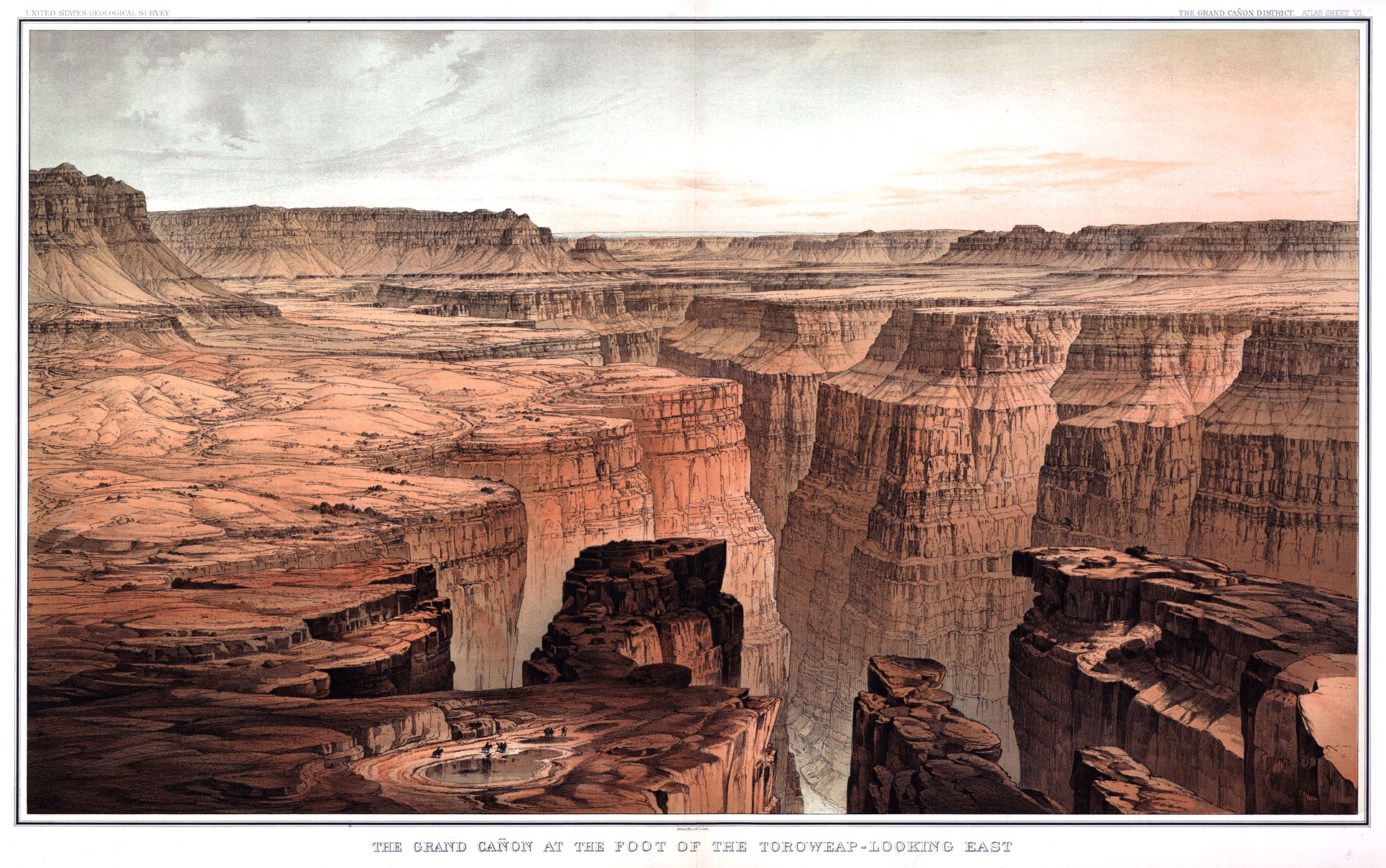
Foot of Toroweap Looking East by William H. Holmes (1882). Artwork such as this was used to popularize the Grand Canyon area.

The known human history of the Grand Canyon area stretches back at least 10,600 years, when the first evidence of human presence in the area is found. Native Americans have inhabited the Grand Canyon and the area now covered by Grand Canyon National Park for at least the last 4,000 of those years. Ancestral Pueblo peoples, first as the Basketmaker culture and later as the more familiar Pueblo people, developed from the Desert Culture as they became less nomadic and more dependent on agriculture. A similar culture, the Cohonina also lived in the canyon area. Drought in the late 13th century likely caused both groups to move on. Other people followed, including the Paiute, Cerbat, and the Navajo, only to be later forced onto reservations by the United States Government.

In September 1540, under direction by conquistador Francisco Vásquez de Coronado to find the fabled Seven Cities of Gold, Captain García López de Cárdenas led a party of Spanish soldiers with Hopi guides to the Grand Canyon. More than 200 years passed before two Spanish priests became the second party of non-Native Americans to see the canyon. U.S. Army Major John Wesley Powell led the 1869 Powell Geographic Expedition through the canyon on the Colorado River. This and later study by geologists uncovered the geology of the Grand Canyon area and helped to advance that science. In the late 19th century, the promise of mineral resources—mainly copper and asbestos—renewed interest in the region. The first pioneer settlements along the rim came in the 1880s.

Early residents soon realized that tourism was destined to be more profitable than mining, and by the turn of the 20th century the Grand Canyon was a well-known tourist destination. Most visitors made the gruelling trip from nearby towns to the South Rim by stagecoach. In 1901 the Grand Canyon Railway was opened from Williams, Arizona, to the South Rim, and the development of formal tourist facilities, especially at Grand Canyon Village, increased dramatically. The Fred Harvey Company developed many facilities at the Grand Canyon, including the luxury El Tovar Hotel on the South Rim in 1905 and Phantom Ranch in the Inner Gorge in 1922. It was first afforded federal protection in 1893 as a forest reserve and later as a U.S. national monument, and the Grand Canyon was designated a national park in 1919, three years after the creation of the National Park Service. Today, Grand Canyon National Park receives about five million visitors each year, a far cry from the annual visitation of 44,173 in 1919.

== Early history ==
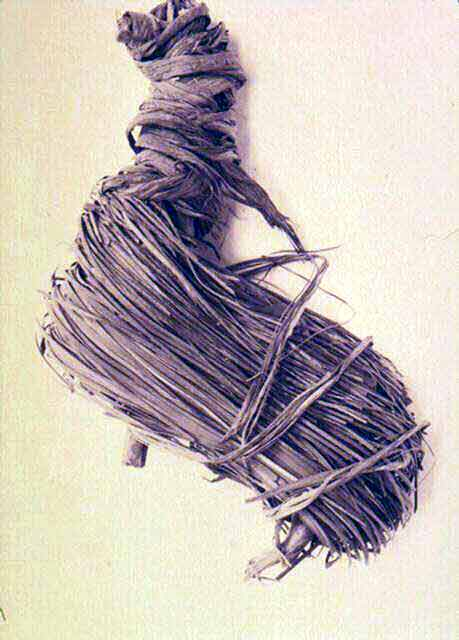
Split-twig figurine from the Grand Canyon

Current archaeological evidence suggests that humans inhabited the Grand Canyon area as far back as 4,000 years ago and at least were passers-through for 6,500 years before that. Radiocarbon dating of artifacts found in limestone caves in the inner canyon indicate ages of 3,000 to 4,000 years. In the 1950s split-twig animal figurines were found in the Redwall Limestone cliffs of the Inner Gorge that were dated in this range. These animal figurines are a few inches (7 to 8 cm) in height and made primarily from twigs of willow or cottonwood. This and other evidence suggests that these inner canyon dwellers were part of Desert Culture; a group of semi-nomadic hunter-gatherer Native American.

The Ancestral Pueblo of the Basketmaker III Era (also called the Histatsinom, meaning "people who lived long ago") evolved from the Desert Culture sometime around 500 BCE. This group inhabited the rim and inner canyon and survived by hunting and gathering along with some limited agriculture. Noted for their basketmaking skills (hence their name), they lived in small communal bands inside caves and circular mud structures called pithouses. Further refinement of agriculture and technology led to a more sedentary and stable lifestyle for the Ancestral Pueblo starting around 500 CE. Contemporary with the flourishing of Ancestral Pueblo culture, another group, called the Cohonina lived west of the current site of Grand Canyon Village.

Ancestral Pueblo in the Grand Canyon area started to use stone in addition to mud and poles to erect above-ground houses sometime around 800 CE. Thus the Pueblo period of Ancestral Pueblo culture was initiated. In summer, the Puebloans migrated from the hot inner canyon to the cooler high plateaus and reversed the journey for winter. Large granaries and multi-room pueblos survive from this period. There are around 2,000 known Ancestral Pueblo archaeological sites in park boundaries. The most accessible site is Tusayan Pueblo, which was constructed sometime c. 1185 and housed 30 or so people.

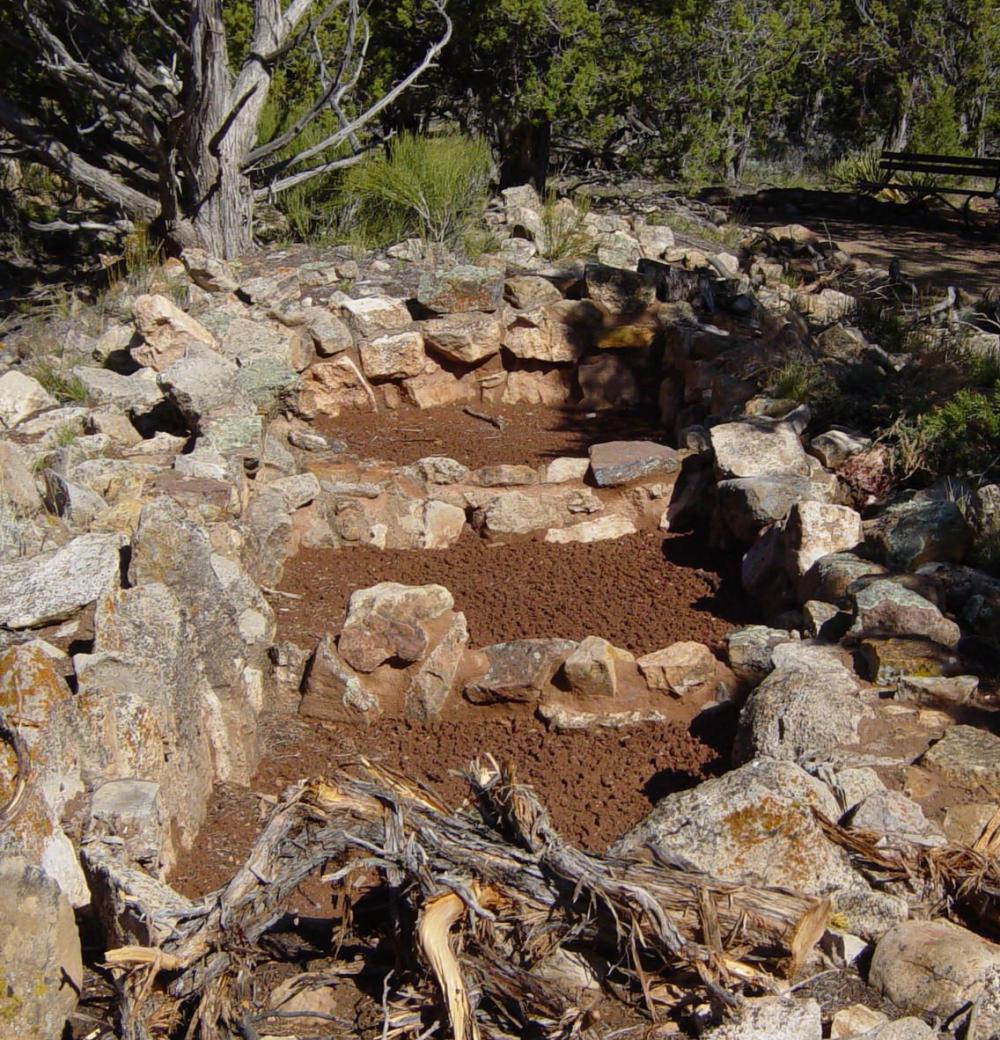
Ancestral Pueblo food storage building ruins at Tusayan Pueblo

Large numbers of dated archaeological sites indicate that the Ancestral Pueblo and the Cohonina flourished until about 1200 CE. But something happened a hundred years later that forced both of these cultures to move away. Several lines of evidence led to a theory that climate change caused a severe drought in the region from 1276 to 1299, forcing these agriculture-dependent cultures to move on. Many Ancestral Pueblo relocated to the Rio Grande and the Little Colorado River drainages, where their descendants, the Hopi and the 19 Pueblos of New Mexico, now live.

For approximately one hundred years the canyon area was uninhabited by humans. Paiute from the east and Cerbat from the west were the first humans to reestablish settlements in and around the Grand Canyon. The Paiute settled the plateaus north of the Colorado River and the Cerbat built their communities south of the river, on the Coconino Plateau. The Navajo, or the Diné, arrived in the area later.

All three cultures were stable until the United States Army moved them to Indian reservations in 1882 as part of the removal efforts that ended the Indian Wars. The Havasupai and Hualapai are descended from the Cerbat and still live in the immediate area. The Havasupai village of Supai in the central part of the Canyon has been occupied for centuries. Adjacent to the eastern part of the park is the Navajo Nation, the largest reservation in the United States. The Hualapai Tribe has occupied the southwestern part of Grand Canyon for centuries. Today, Grand Canyon National Park recognizes 11 affiliated tribes.

== Exploration ==
=== Spanish ===
The first Europeans reached the Grand Canyon in September 1540. It was a group of about 13 Spanish soldiers led by García López de Cárdenas, dispatched from the army of Francisco Vásquez de Coronado on its quest to find the fabulous Seven Cities of Gold. The group was led by Hopi guides and, assuming they took the most likely route, must have reached the canyon at the South Rim, probably between today's Desert View and Moran Point. According to Castañeda, he and his company came to a point "from whose brink it looked as if the opposite side must be more than three or four leagues by air line."

The report indicates that they greatly misjudged the proportions of the gorge. On the one hand, they estimated that the canyon was about three to four leagues wide (13–16 km, 8–10 mi), which is quite accurate. At the same time, however, they believed that the river, which they could see from above, was only 2 m (6 ft) wide (in reality it is about a hundred times wider). Being in dire need of water, and wanting to cross the giant obstacle, the soldiers started searching for a way down to the canyon floor that would be passable for them along with their horses. After three full days, they still had not been successful, and it is speculated that the Hopi, who probably knew a way down to the canyon floor, were reluctant to lead them there.

As a last resort, Cárdenas finally commanded the three lightest and most agile men of his group to climb down by themselves (their names are given as Pablo de Melgosa, Juan Galeras, and an unknown third soldier). After several hours, the men returned, reporting that they had only made one third of the distance down to the river, and that "what seemed easy from above was not so". Furthermore, they claimed that some of the boulders which they had seen from the rim, and estimated to be about as tall as a man, were in fact bigger than the Great Tower of Seville, at 104.1 m (342 ft). Cárdenas finally had to give up and returned to the main army. His report of an impassable barrier forestalled further visitation to the area for two hundred years.

Only in 1776 did two Spanish Priests, Fathers Francisco Atanasio Domínguez and Silvestre Vélez de Escalante travel along the North Rim again, together with a group of Spanish soldiers, exploring southern Utah in search of a route from Santa Fe, New Mexico to Monterey, California. Also in 1776, Fray Francisco Garces, a Franciscan missionary, spent a week near Havasupai, unsuccessfully attempting to convert a band of Native Americans. He described the canyon as "profound".

=== Americans ===
James Ohio Pattie and a group of American trappers and mountain men were probably the next Europeans to reach the canyon in 1826, although there is little supporting documentation.

The signing of the Treaty of Guadalupe Hidalgo in 1848 ceded the Grand Canyon region to the United States. Jules Marcou of the Pacific Railroad Survey made the first geologic observations of the canyon and surrounding area in 1856.

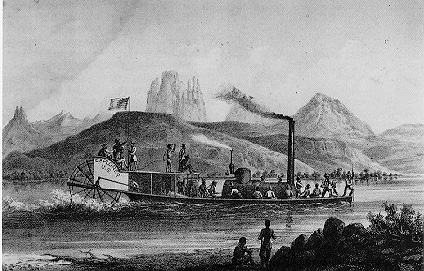
The 54-foot (16 m) paddle wheeler Explorer in the Lt. Joseph Ives expedition up the Colorado River. Period engraving.

Jacob Hamblin (a Mormon missionary) was sent by Brigham Young in the 1850s to locate easy river crossing sites in the canyon. Building good relations with local Native Americans and white settlers, he discovered Lee's Ferry in 1858 and Pearce Ferry (operated by, and named for, Harrison Pearce)—both sites suitable for ferry operation at each end of the Canyon.

In 1857 Edward Fitzgerald Beale led an expedition to survey a wagon road from Fort Defiance, Arizona to the Colorado River. On September 19 near present-day National Canyon they came upon what May Humphreys Stacey described in his journal as "a wonderful canyon four thousand feet deep. Everyone (in the party) admitted that he never before saw anything to match or equal this astonishing natural curiosity."

A U.S. War Department expedition led by Lt. Joseph Ives was launched in 1857 to investigate the area's potential for natural resources, to find railroad routes to the west coast, and assess the feasibility of an up-river navigation route from the Gulf of California. The group traveled in a stern wheeler steamboat named Explorer. After two months and 350 miles (560 km) of difficult navigation, his party reached Black Canyon some two months after George Johnson. In the process, the Explorer struck a rock and was abandoned. The group later traveled eastwards along the South Rim of the Grand Canyon.

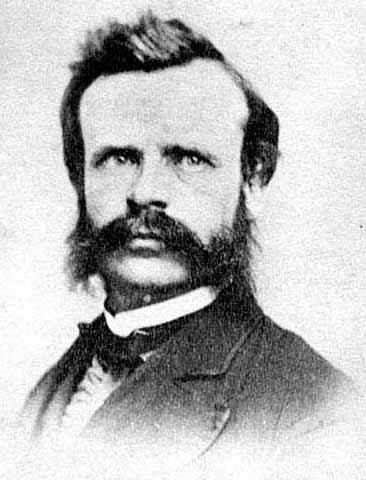
John Wesley Powell in 1869

A man of his time, Ives discounted his own impressions on the beauty of the canyon and declared it and the surrounding area as "altogether valueless", remarking that his expedition would be "the last party of whites to visit this profitless locality". Attached to Ives' expedition was geologist John Strong Newberry who had a very different impression of the canyon. After returning, Newberry convinced fellow geologist John Wesley Powell that a boat run through the Grand Canyon to complete the survey would be worth the risk. (Note: Geologist Jules Marcou of the Pacific Railroad Survey made the first geologic observations of the canyon in 1856.) Powell was a major in the United States Army and was a veteran of the American Civil War, a conflict that cost him his right forearm in the Battle of Shiloh.

More than a decade after the Ives Expedition and with help from the Smithsonian Institution, Powell led the first of the Powell Expeditions to explore the region and document its scientific offerings. On May 24, 1869, the group of nine men set out from Green River Station in Wyoming down the Colorado River and through the Grand Canyon. This first expedition was poorly funded and consequently no photographer or graphic artist was included. While in the Canyon of Lodore one of the group's four boats capsized, spilling most of their food and much of their scientific equipment into the river. This shortened the expedition to one hundred days. On August 27, 1869, the men, wet, hungry, and dealing with contention among the trip members, came upon a rapid worse than any they had yet seen. The group didn’t know if hiking out or traveling on by boat was the appropriate action. The next day they split amicably into two groups with William Dunn, Oramel and Seneca Howland heading on foot up a side canyon now called Separation Canyon. The three men were never seen again while Powell and the others stayed on the river and exited Grand Canyon two days later. Some historians have speculated the three were killed by the Shivwits Band of Paiutes, the Hualapai, or by Mormons in the town of Toquerville.

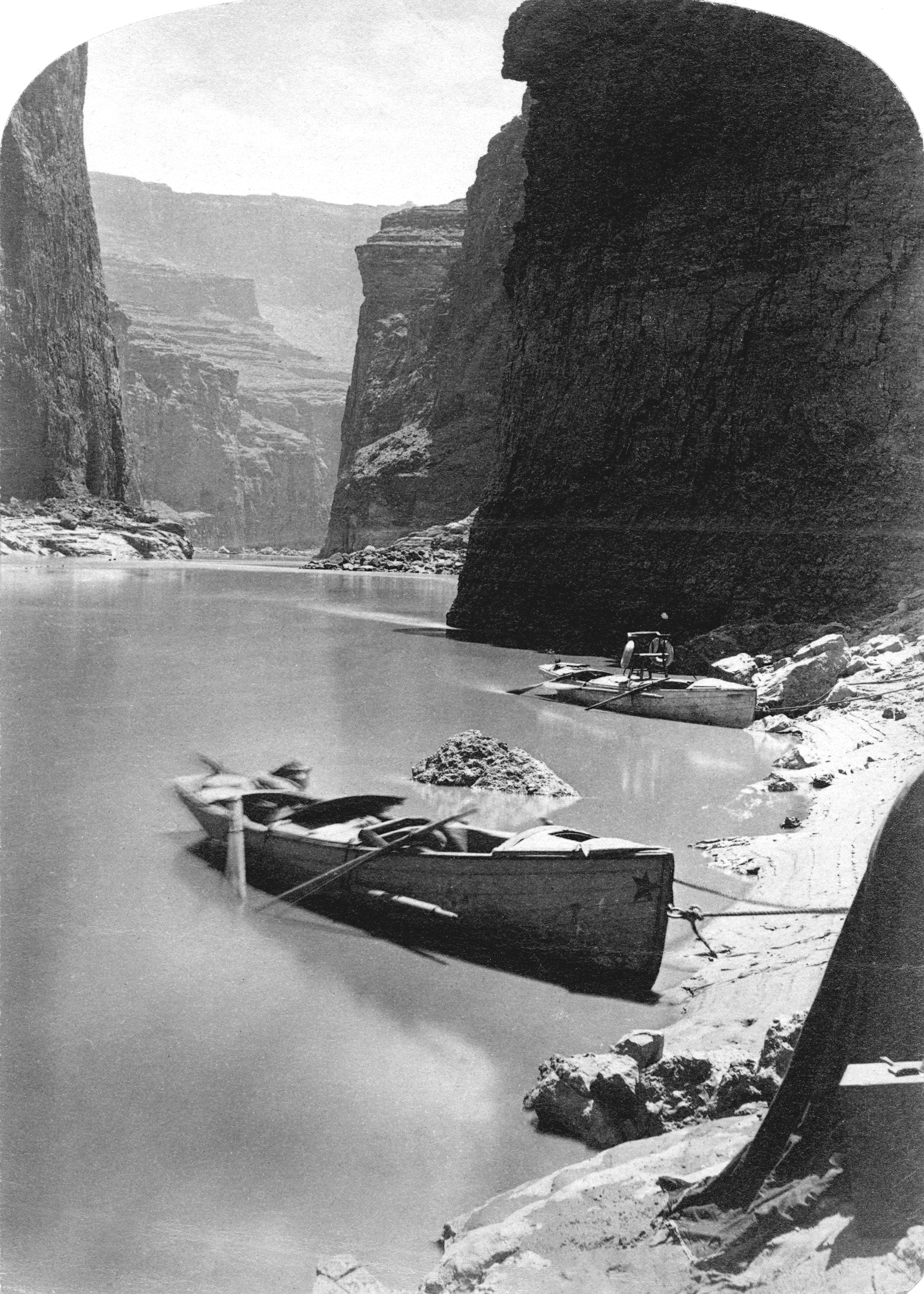
Noon Day Rest in Marble Canyon from the second Powell Expedition, c. 1872

Two years later a much better-funded Powell-led party returned with redesigned boats and a chain of several supply stations along their route. This time, photographer E.O. Beaman and 17-year-old artist Frederick Dellenbaugh were included. Beaman left the group in January 1872 over a dispute with Powell and his replacement, James Fennemore, quit August that same year due to poor health, leaving boatman John K. Hillers as the official photographer (nearly one ton of photographic equipment was needed on site to process each shot). Famed painter Thomas Moran joined the expedition in the summer of 1873, after the river voyage and thus only viewed the canyon from the rim. His 1873 painting "Chasm of the Colorado" was bought by the United States Congress in 1874 and hung in the lobby of the Senate.

The Powell expeditions systematically cataloged rock formations, plants, animals, and archaeological sites. Photographs and illustrations from the Powell expeditions greatly popularized the canyonland region of the southwest United States, especially the Grand Canyon (appreciating this, Powell added increasing resources to that aspect of his expeditions). Powell later used these photographs and illustrations in his lecture tours, making him a national figure. Rights to reproduce 650 of the expeditions' 1,400 stereographs were sold to help fund future Powell projects. In 1881 he became the second director of the U.S. Geological Survey.

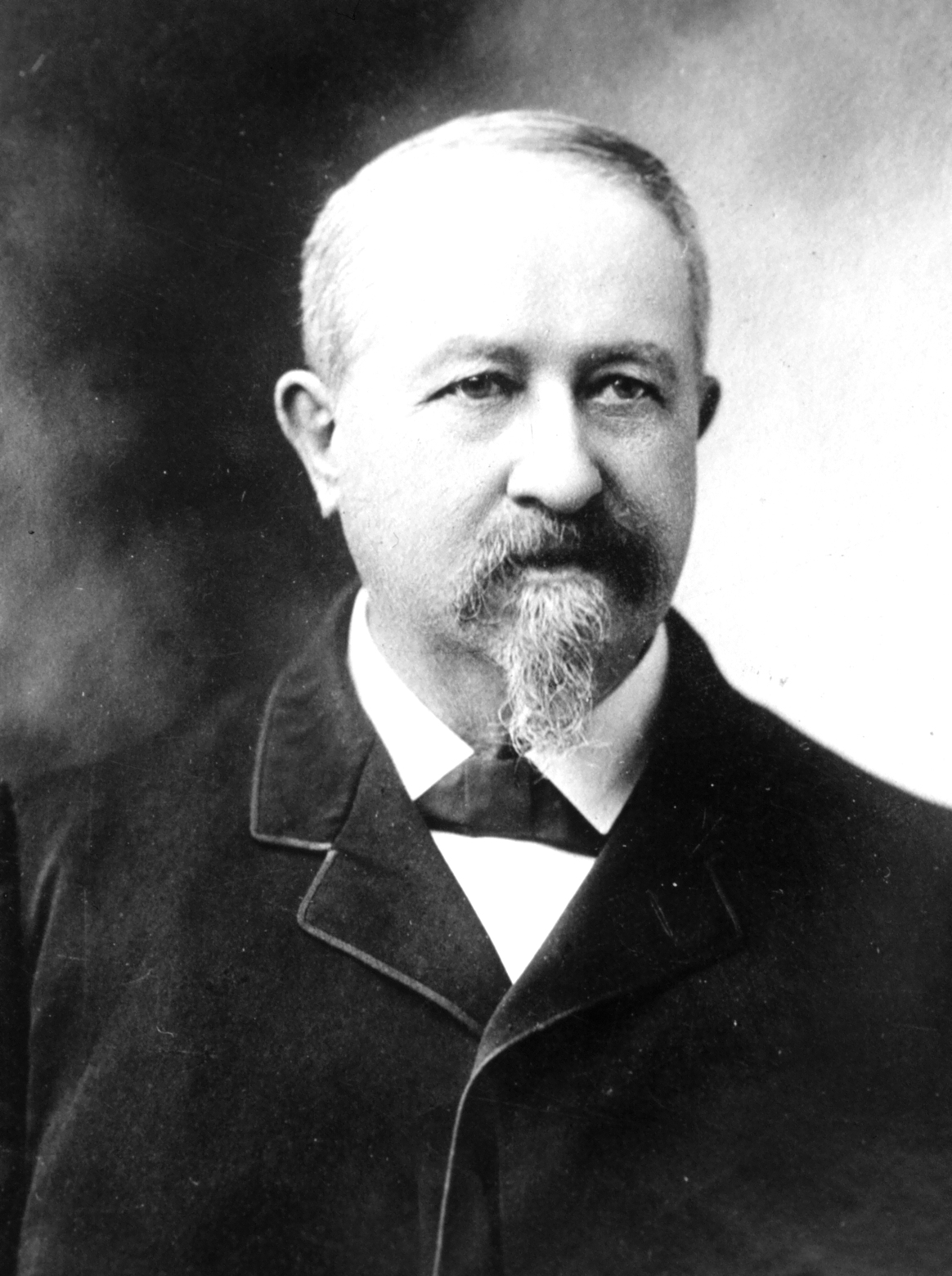
Clarence Dutton

Geologist Clarence Dutton followed up on Powell's work in 1880–1881 with the first in-depth geological survey of the newly formed U.S. Geological Survey. Painters Thomas Moran and William Henry Holmes accompanied Dutton, who was busy drafting detailed descriptions of the area's geology. The report that resulted from the team's effort was titled A Tertiary History of The Grand Canyon District, with Atlas and was published in 1882. This and later study by geologists uncovered the geology of the Grand Canyon area and helped to advance that science. Both the Powell and Dutton expeditions helped to increase interest in the canyon and surrounding region.

The Brown-Stanton expedition was started in 1889 to survey the route for a "water-level" railroad line through the canyons of the Colorado River to the Gulf of California. The proposed Denver, Colorado Canyon, and Pacific Railway was to carry coal from mines in Colorado. Expedition leader Frank M. Brown, his chief engineer Robert Brewster Stanton, and 14 other men set out in six boats from Green River, Utah, on May 25, 1889. Brown and two others drowned near the head of Marble Canyon. Stanton restarted the expedition from the Dirty Devil River (a tributary of Glen Canyon) on November 25 and traveled through the Grand Canyon. The expedition reached the Gulf of California on April 26, 1890 but the railroad was never built.

Prospectors in the 1870s and 1880s staked mining claims in the canyon. They hoped that previously discovered deposits of asbestos, copper, lead, and zinc would be profitable to mine. Access to and from this remote region and problems getting ore out of the canyon and its rock made the whole exercise not worth the effort. Most moved on, but some stayed to seek profit in the tourist trade. Their activities did improve pre-existing Indian trails, such as the Bright Angel Trail.

== Tourism ==
=== Transportation ===
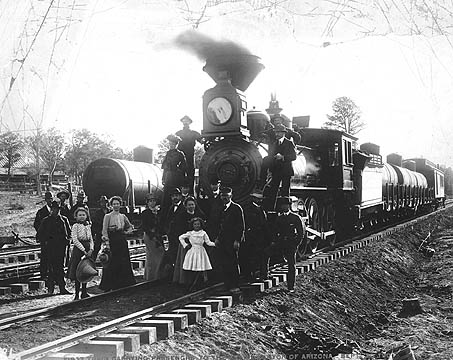
A group photo of passengers who rode on the first run of the Grand Canyon Railway

A rail line to the largest city in the area, Flagstaff, was completed in 1882 by the Santa Fe Railroad. Stage coaches started to bring tourists from Flagstaff to the Grand Canyon the next year—an eleven-hour trip greatly reduced in 1901 when a spur of the Santa Fe Railroad to Grand Canyon Village was completed. The first scheduled train with paying passengers of the Grand Canyon Railway arrived from Williams, Arizona, on September 17 that year. The 64-mile (103 km) long trip cost $3.95 ($132 as of 2025), and naturalist John Muir later commended the railroad for its limited environmental impact.

The first automobile was driven to the Grand Canyon in January 1902. Oliver Lippincott from Los Angeles, drove his American Bicycle Company built Toledo steam car to the South Rim from Flagstaff. Lippincott, Al Doyle a guide from Flagstaff and two writers set out on the afternoon of January 2, anticipating a seven-hour journey. Two days later, the hungry and dehydrated party arrived at their destination; the countryside was just too rough for the ten-horsepower (7 kW) auto. Winfield Hoggaboon, one of the writers on the trip, wrote an amusing and detailed three page article in the Los Angeles Herald Illustrated Magazine on February 2, 1902, "To the Grand Canyon by Automobile". A three-day drive from Utah in 1907 was required to reach the North Rim for the first time.

Competition with the automobile forced the Santa Fe Railroad to cease operation of the Grand Canyon Railway in 1968 (only three passengers were on the last run). The railway was restored and service reintroduced in 1989, and it has since carried hundreds of passengers a day. Trains remained the preferred way to travel to the canyon until they were surpassed by the auto in the 1930s. By the early 1990s more than a million automobiles per year visited the park.

West Rim Drive was completed in 1912. In the late 1920s the first rim-to-rim access was established by the North Kaibab suspension bridge over the Colorado River. Paved roads did not reach the less popular and more remote North Rim until 1926, and that area, being higher in elevation, is closed due to winter weather from November to April. Construction of a road along part of the South Rim was completed in 1935.

=== Accommodations ===
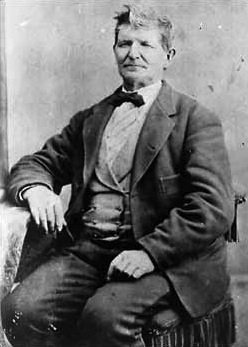
John D.Lee (Utah State Historical Society)

John D. Lee was the first person who catered to travelers to the canyon. In 1872, he established a ferry service at the confluence of the Colorado and Paria rivers. Lee was in hiding, having been accused of leading the Mountain Meadows massacre in 1857. He was tried and executed for this crime in 1877. During his trial, he played host to members of the Powell Expedition, who were waiting for their photographer, Major James Fennemore, to arrive (Fennemore took the last photo of Lee sitting on his own coffin). Emma, one of Lee's nineteen wives, continued the ferry business after her husband's death. In 1876, Harrison Pearce established another ferry service, Pearce Ferry, at the western end of the canyon.

In 1884, Julius and Cecelia Farlee opened the two-room Farlee Hotel near Diamond Creek, which operated until 1889. That year, Louis Boucher opened a larger hotel at Dripping Springs. John Hance opened his ranch near Grandview to tourists in 1886, only to sell it nine years later in order to start a long career as a Grand Canyon guide (in 1896, he also became local postmaster).

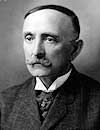
William Wallace Bass

William Wallace Bass opened a tent house campground in 1890. Bass Camp had a small central building with common facilities such as a kitchen, dining room, and sitting room inside. Rates were $2.50 a day ($90 as of 2025), and the complex was 20 miles (30 km) west of the Grand Canyon Railway's Bass Station (Ash Fort). Bass also built the stage coach road that he used to carry his patrons from the train station to his hotel. A second Bass Camp was built along the Shinumo Creek drainage.

The Grand Canyon Hotel Company was incorporated in 1892 and charged with building services along the stage route to the canyon. In 1896 the same man who bought Hance's Grandview ranch opened Bright Angel Hotel in Grand Canyon Village. The Cameron Hotel opened in 1903, and its owner started to charge a toll to use the Bright Angel Trail.

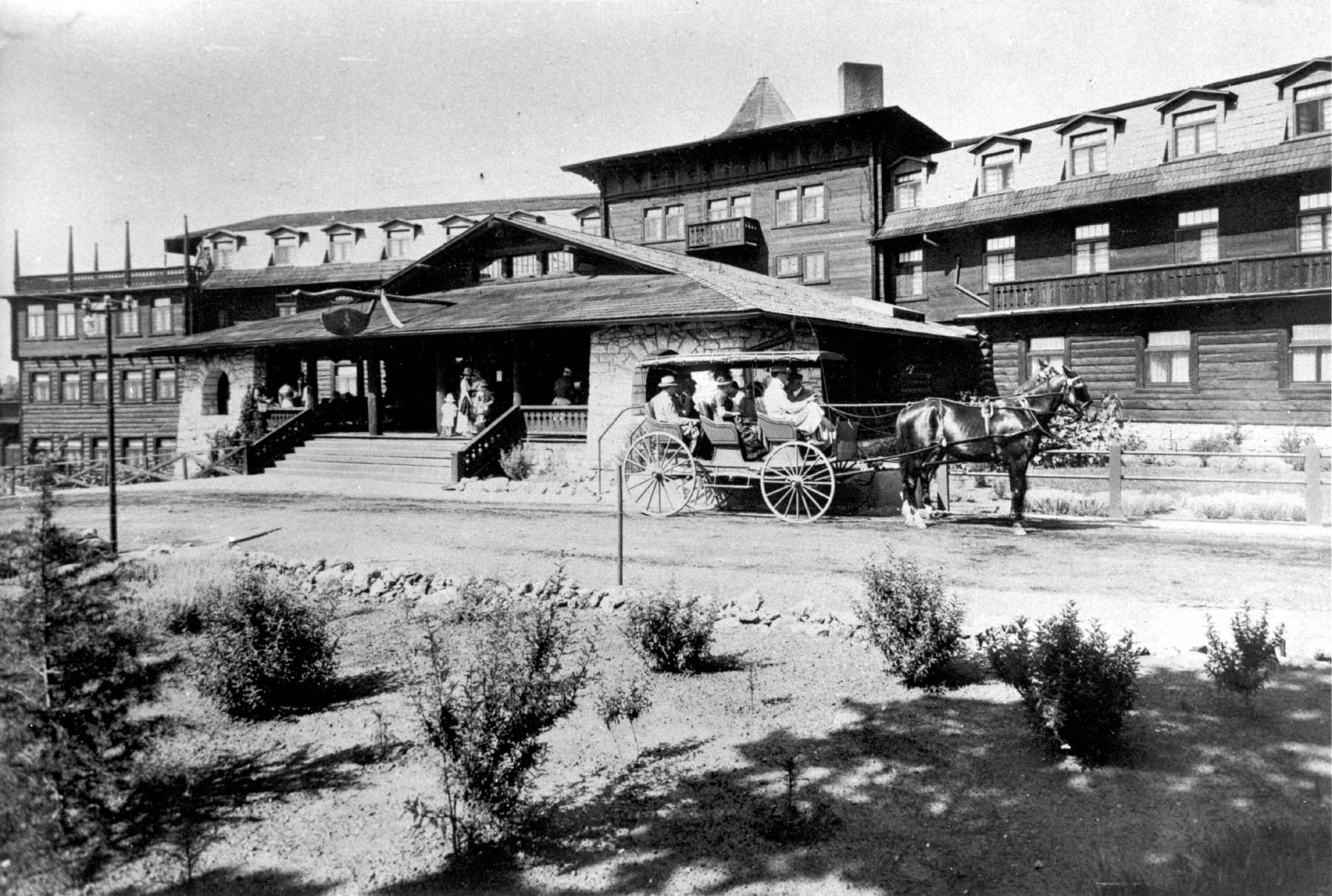
The El Tovar Hotel in the 1900s

Things changed in 1905, when the luxury El Tovar Hotel opened within steps of the Grand Canyon Railway's terminus. El Tovar was named for Don Pedro de Tovar who tradition says is the Spaniard who learned about the canyon from Hopis and told Coronado. Charles Whittlesey designed the arts and crafts-styled rustic hotel complex, which was built with logs from Oregon and local stone at a cost of $250,000 for the hotel ($8,960,000 as of 2025) and another $50,000 for the stables ($1,790,000 as of 2025). El Tovar was owned by Santa Fe Railroad and operated by its chief concessionaire, the Fred Harvey Company.

Fred Harvey hired Mary Elizabeth Jane Colter in 1902 as company architect. She was responsible for five buildings at the Grand Canyon: Hopi House (1905), Lookout Studio (1914), Hermit's Rest (1914), Desert View Watchtower (1932), and Bright Angel Lodge (1935). She stayed with the company until her retirement in 1948.

A cable car system spanning the Colorado went into operation at Rust's Camp, located near the mouth of Bright Angel Creek, in 1907. Former U.S. President Theodore Roosevelt stayed at the camp in 1913. That, along with the fact that while president he declared Grand Canyon a U.S. National Monument in 1908, led to the camp being renamed Roosevelt's Camp. In 1922 the National Park Service gave the facility its current name, Phantom Ranch.

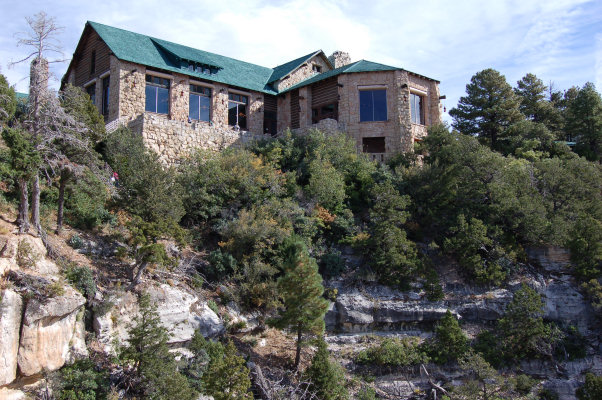
Grand Canyon Lodge

In 1917 on the North Rim, W.W. Wylie built accommodations at Bright Angel Point. The Grand Canyon Lodge opened on the North Rim in 1928. Built by a subsidiary of the Union Pacific Railroad called the Utah Parks Company, the lodge was designed by Gilbert Stanley Underwood who was also the architect for the Ahwahnee Hotel in California's Yosemite Valley. Much of the lodge was destroyed by fire in the winter of 1932, and a rebuilt lodge did not open until 1937. The facility is managed by TW Recreation Services. Bright Angel Lodge and the Auto Camp Lodge opened in 1935 on the South Rim.

=== Activities ===
New hiking trails, along old Indian trails, were established during this time as well. The world-famous mule rides down Bright Angel Trail were mass-marketed by the El Tovar Hotel. By the early 1990s, 20,000 people per year made the journey into the canyon by mule, 800,000 by hiking, 22,000 passed through the canyon by raft, and another 700,000 tourists fly over it in air tours (fixed-wing aircraft and helicopter). Overflights were limited to a narrow corridor in 1956 after two planes crashed, killing all on board. In 1991 nearly 400 search and rescues were performed, mostly for unprepared hikers who suffered from heat exhaustion and dehydration while ascending from the canyon (normal exhaustion and injured ankles are also common in rescuees). An IMAX theater just outside the park shows a reenactment of the Powell Expedition.

The Kolb Brothers, Emery and Ellsworth, built a photographic studio on the South Rim at the trailhead of Bright Angel Trail in 1904. Hikers and mule caravans intent on descending down the canyon would stop at the Kolb Studio to have their photos taken. The Kolb Brothers processed the prints before their customers returned to the rim. Using the newly invented Pathé Bray camera in 1911–12, they became the first to make a motion picture of a river trip through the canyon that itself was only the eighth such successful journey. From 1915 to 1975 the film they produced was shown twice a day to tourists with Emery Kolb at first narrating in person and later through tape (a feud with Fred Harvey prevented pre-1915 showings).

== Protection efforts ==
By the late 19th century, the conservation movement was increasing national interest in preserving natural wonders like the Grand Canyon. National parks in Yellowstone and around Yosemite Valley were established by the early 1890s. U.S. Senator Benjamin Harrison introduced a bill in 1887 to establish a national park at the Grand Canyon. The bill died in committee, but on February 20, 1893, Harrison (then President of the United States) declared the Grand Canyon to be a National Forest Preserve. Mining and logging were allowed, but the designation did offer some protection.

President Theodore Roosevelt visited the Grand Canyon in 1903. An avid outdoorsman and staunch conservationist, he established the Grand Canyon Game Preserve on November 28, 1906. Livestock grazing was reduced, but predators such as mountain lions, eagles, and wolves were eradicated. Roosevelt added adjacent national forest lands and re-designated the preserve a national monument on January 11, 1908. Opponents, such as holders of land and mining claims, blocked efforts to reclassify the monument as a national park for 11 years. Grand Canyon National Park was finally established as the 17th U.S. National Park by an Act of Congress signed into law by President Woodrow Wilson on February 26, 1919. The National Park Service declared the Fred Harvey Company to the official park concessionaire in 1920 and bought William Wallace Bass out of business.

An area of almost 310 square miles (800 km^{2}) adjacent to the park was designated as a second Grand Canyon National Monument on December 22, 1932. Marble Canyon National Monument was established on January 20, 1969, and covered about 41 square miles (105 km^{2}). An act signed by President Gerald Ford on January 3, 1975, doubled the size of Grand Canyon National Park by merging these adjacent national monuments and other federal land into it. That same act gave Havasu Canyon back to the Havasupai tribe. From that point, the park stretched along a 278-mile (447 km) segment of the Colorado River from the southern border of Glen Canyon National Recreation Area to the eastern boundary of Lake Mead National Recreation Area. Grand Canyon National Park was designated a World Heritage Site on October 24, 1979.

In 1935, Hoover Dam started to impound Lake Mead south of the canyon. Conservationists lost a battle to save upstream Glen Canyon from becoming a reservoir. The Glen Canyon Dam was completed in 1966 to control flooding and to provide water and hydroelectric power. Seasonal variations of high flow and flooding in the spring and low flow in summer have been replaced by a much more regulated system. The much more controlled Colorado has a dramatically reduced sediment load, which starves beaches and sand bars. In addition, clearer water allows significant algae growth to occur on the riverbed, giving the river a green color.

In 2008, the Grand Canyon Railway and their parent company, Xanterra, decided to use only EMD f40ph diesel locomotives as their main motive power for their trackage, since they felt that their steam locomotives, as well as their Alco fa units, gave the environment more visible smoke. The steamers also burn more oil than an average diesel unit, hence they can also be more pricey to operate and maintain. However, after a variety of formers protested to the GCR to bring back steam operations, the GCR decided to bring back steam operations, as they converted both of their operational steamers, 29 and 4960, to burn recycled waste vegetable oil collected from nearby restaurants by third-party suppliers.

=== Overflights ===
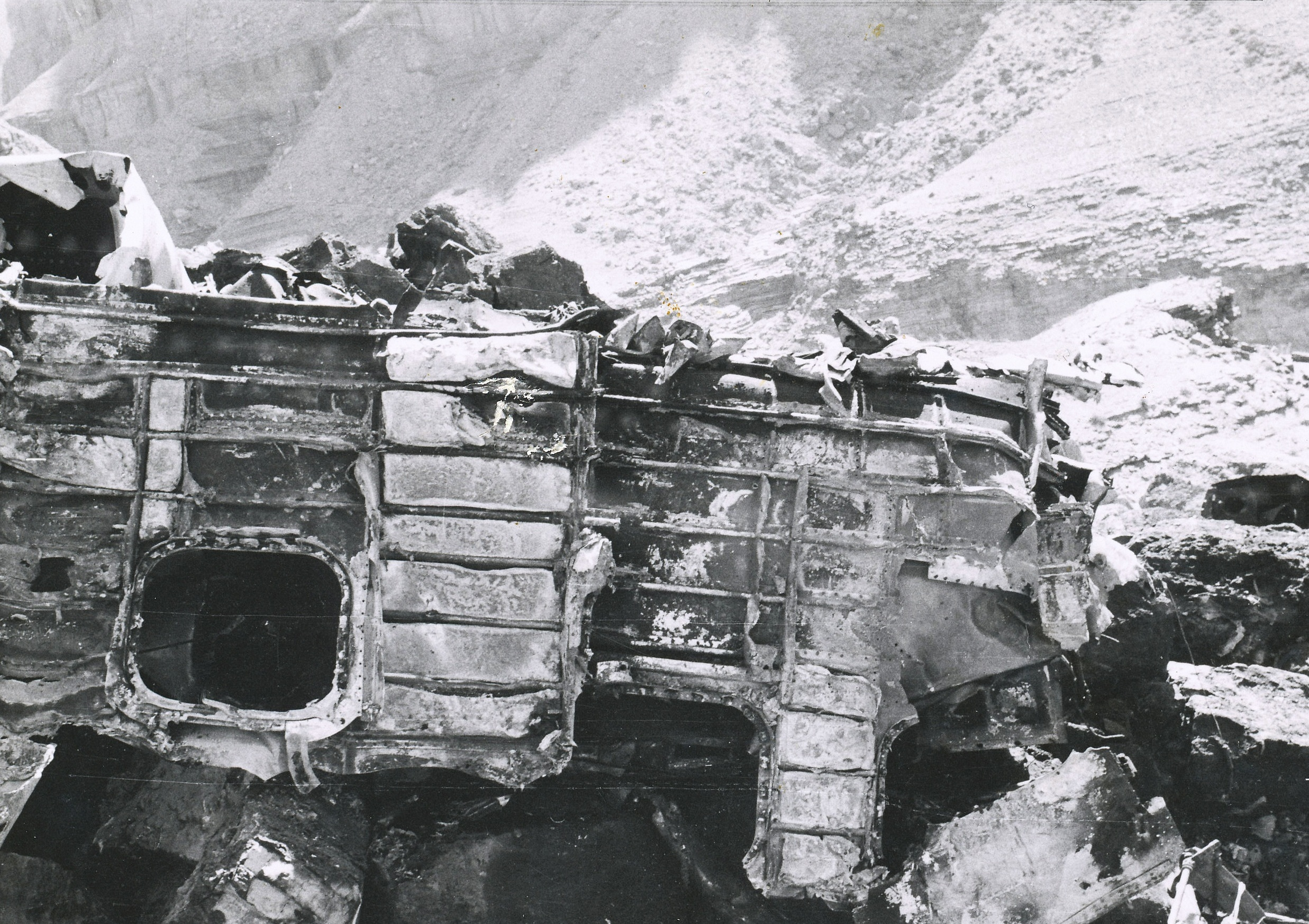
The aftermath of the TWA flight

With the advent of commercial flights, the Grand Canyon has been a popular site for aircraft overflights.

In 1956, the Grand Canyon was the site of the deadliest commercial aviation disaster in history at the time. On the morning of June 30, 1956, a Trans World Airlines Lockheed Super Constellation and a United Air Lines Douglas DC-7 departed Los Angeles International Airport within three minutes of one another on eastbound transcontinental flights. Approximately 90 minutes later, the two propeller-driven airliners collided at 21,000 feet above the canyon while both were flying in unmonitored airspace.

The wreckage of both planes fell into the eastern portion of the canyon, on Temple and Chuar Buttes, near the confluence of the Colorado and Little Colorado rivers. The disaster killed all 128 passengers and crew members aboard both planes.

This accident led to the institution of high-altitude airways and direct radar observation of aircraft (known as positive control) by en route ground controllers.

Following additional incidents, Congress passed the Overflights Act of 1987, which banned flights below the rim and created flight-free zones. The tourist flights over the canyon have also created a noise problem, so the number of flights over the park has been restricted.

=== Air pollution ===
The primary mobile source of Grand Canyon haze, the automobile, is currently regulated under a series of federal, state and local initiatives. The Grand Canyon Visibility Transport Commission cites U.S. government laws regulating automobile emissions and gasoline standards, often slow to change because of the automobile industry's planning schedule, as a primary contributor to air quality issues in the area. They advocate policies leaning toward stricter emission standards via cleaner burning fuel and improved automobile emissions technology.

Air pollution from those vehicles and wind-blown pollution from Las Vegas, Nevada area has reduced visibility in the Grand Canyon and vicinity. During the past decade, various regional coal-fired electric utilities having little or no pollution control equipment were targeted as the primary stationary sources of Grand Canyon air pollution. In the 1980s the Navajo Generating Station at Page, Arizona, (15 miles away) was identified as the primary source for anywhere from fifty percent to ninety percent of the Grand Canyon's air quality problems. In 1999, the Mohave Generating Station in Laughlin, Nevada, (75) miles away settled a long-standing lawsuit and agreed to install end-of-point sulfur scrubbers on its smoke stacks. The power plants shut down in 2019 and 2005, respectively.

=== Uranium mining ===
Between 2003 and 2011, 2,215 mining claims had been requested that are adjacent to the canyon, including claims for uranium mines. Critics of uranium mining are concerned that uranium will leach into the aquifers feeding the Colorado River and contaminate the water supply for up to 18 million people. In 2009, U.S. Interior Secretary Ken Salazar published a Notice of Intent to suspend approvals for new uranium mining in the area. In 2012, Salazar established a 20-year moratorium (known as the "Northern Arizona Withdrawal") withdrawing 1 million acres (4,000 km^{2}) from the permitting process for uranium and hardrock mining, stating "People from all over the country and around the world come to visit the Grand Canyon. Numerous American Indian tribes regard this magnificent icon as a sacred place and millions of people in the Colorado River Basin depend on the river for drinking water, irrigation, industrial and environmental use." However, Salazar's 20-year moratorium on new mines still allows mines with previous authorization to operate.

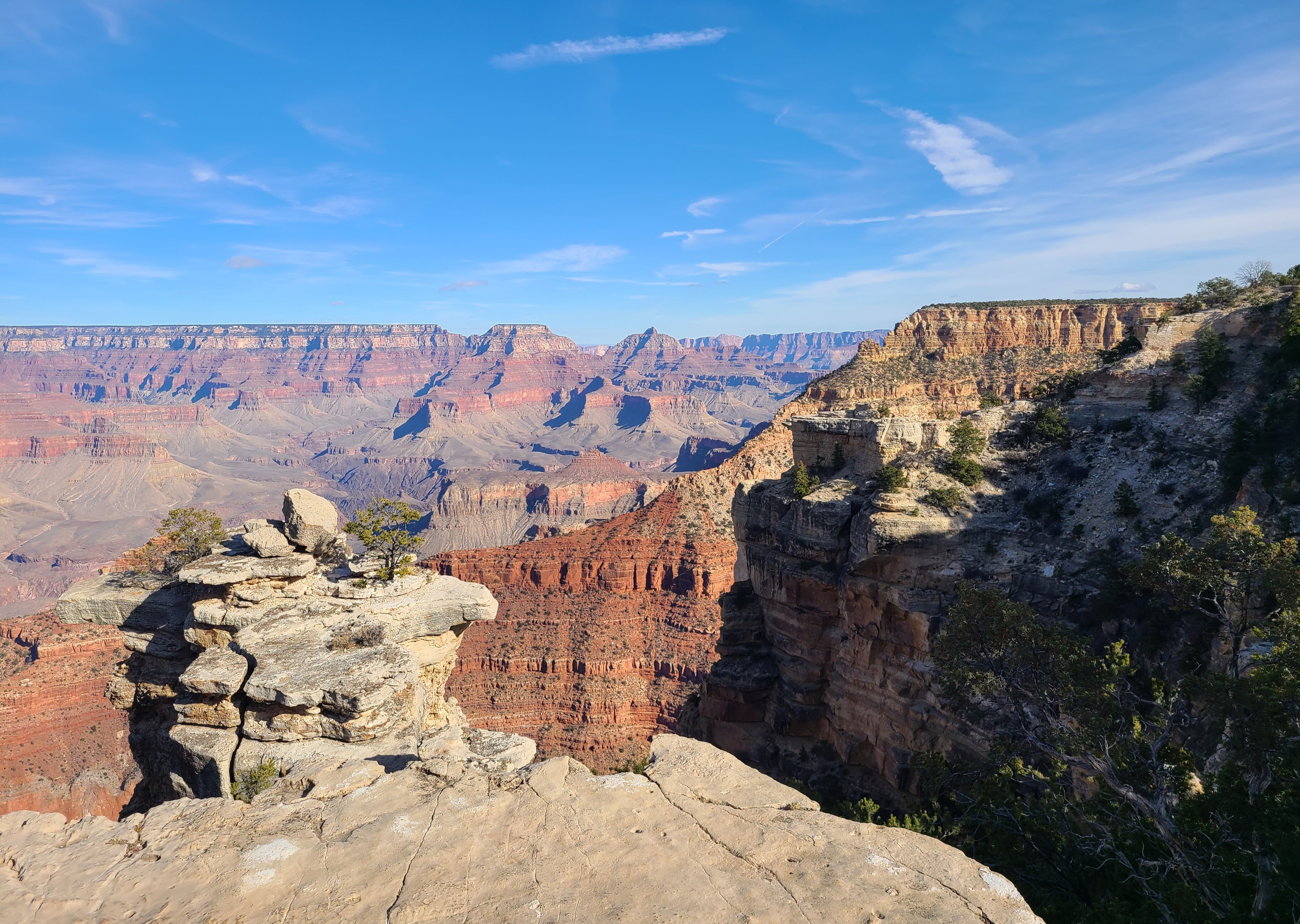
View of Grand Canyon from Mather Point

Multiple challenges have been brought into court both against the moratorium and against the operation of uranium mines in the area. The federal government's 2012 moratorium was upheld by the U.S. District Court for Arizona in 2014, but appealed in November 2014 as National Mining Association v. Jewell (No. 14-17350). The 9th Circuit Court of Appeals again upheld the moratorium in 2017, stating that the Secretary of the Interior held valid withdrawal authority.

Havasupai Tribe v. Provencio was also argued at multiple court levels based on multiple grounds. The Havasupai people and the Grand Canyon Trust sought to block the reopening of the Pinyon Plain Mine (formerly Canyon Uranium Mine). Activity at the mine had ceased in 1992, ten years prior to the moratorium on new development in 2012. Appellants challenged the U.S. Forest Service's consultation process for approving reopening of the mine. As of February 22, 2022, the 9th U.S. Circuit Court of Appeals rejected the arguments in No. 20-16401, concluding that the Forest Service had not acted arbitrarily in making its decision.

A study examining samples of groundwater from 180 spring sites and 26 wells in the Grand Canyon region has assessed the presence of uranium in groundwater from September 1, 1981, to October 7, 2020. The goal of the study was to establish a baseline assessment of groundwater conditions in the Grand Canyon region. At 95% of sites, maximum observed uranium concentrations were below the EPA's Maximum Contaminant Level for drinking water, 30 μg/L. At 86% of sites, uranium concentrations were below the Canadian level for protection of freshwater aquatic life, 15 μg/L.

On August 8, 2023, U.S. President Joe Biden designated Baaj Nwaavjo I’tah Kukveni – Ancestral Footprints of the Grand Canyon National Monument, a move aimed at conserving nearly 1 million acres of greater Grand Canyon landscape and permanently preventing new mining claims.

== See also ==
- Havasupai–Hualapai language

== Bibliography ==
- Pedro de Castañeda of Najera (1990) [1596]. The Journey of Coronado, 1540–1542 [Originally published as: Account of the Expedition to Cibola which took place in the year 1540]. Translated by George Parker Winship. Seville (orig.); Golden, Colorado (trans.): Fulcrum Publishing. pp. 115–117. ISBN 1-55591-066-1.
- Harris, Ann G.; Tuttle, Esther; Tuttle, Sherwood D. (1997). Geology of National Parks (5th ed.). Iowa: Kendall/Hunt Publishing. ISBN 0-7872-5353-7.
- Kiver, Eugene P.; Harris, David V. (1999). Geology of U.S. Parklands (5th ed.). New York: John Wiley & Sons. ISBN 0-471-33218-6.
- O'Connor, Letitia Burns (1992). The Grand Canyon. Los Angeles: Perpetua Press. pp. 16–19, 30–32. ISBN 0-88363-969-6.
- Tufts, Lorraine Salem (1998). Secrets in The Grand Canyon, Zion and Bryce Canyon National Parks (3rd ed.). North Palm Beach, Florida: National Photographic Collections. ISBN 0-9620255-3-4.
