= First United Methodist Church (Albuquerque, New Mexico) =

Historic church in New Mexico, United States

- First Methodist Episcopal Church
- U.S. National Register of Historic Places
- NM State Register of Cultural Properties
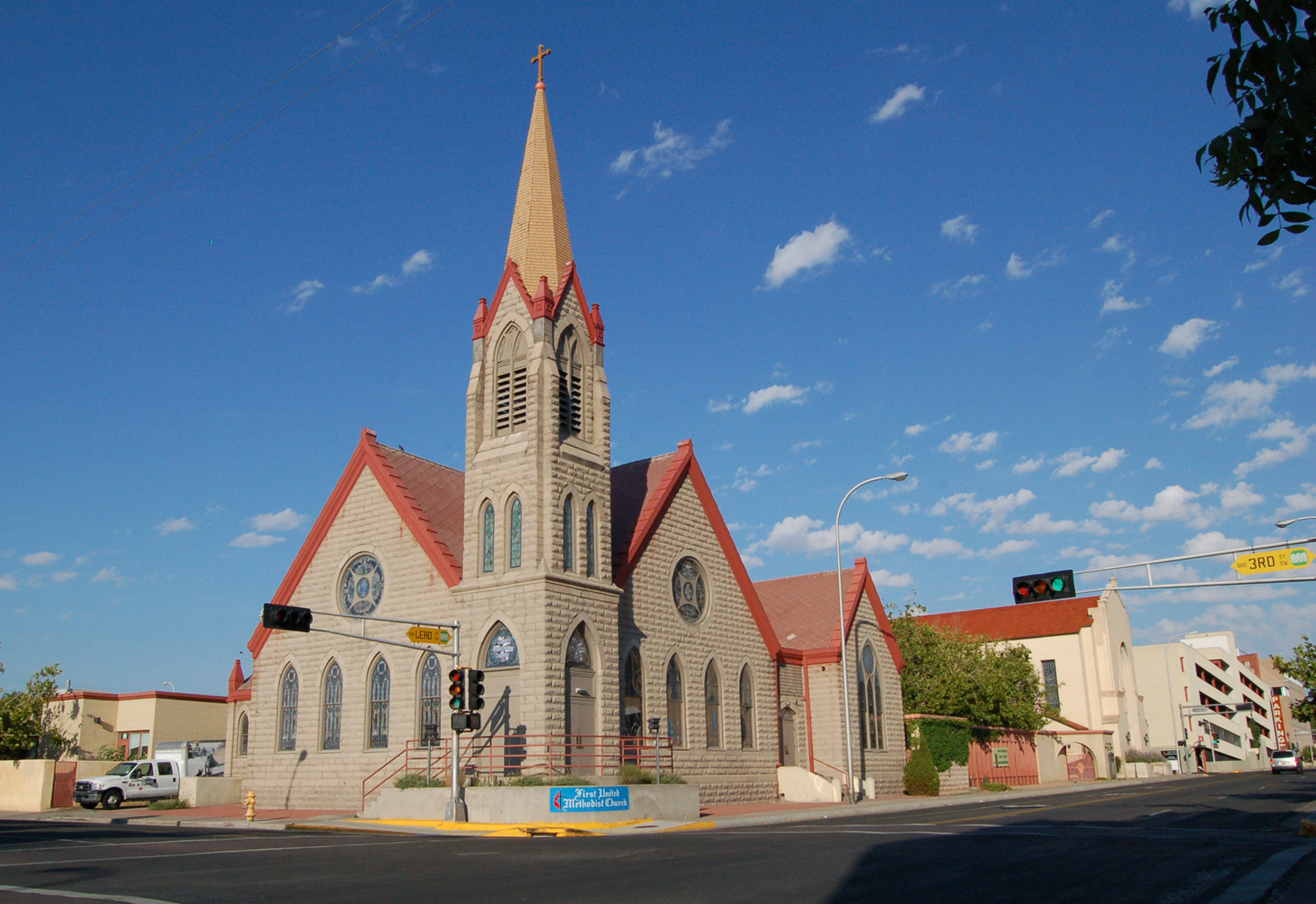

- Location within New Mexico Location within the United States
- Location: 315 Coal Ave SW, Albuquerque, New Mexico
- Coordinates: 35°4′52.5″N 106°39′4.5″W
- Area: 0.5 acres (0.20 ha)
- Built: 1904
- Architect: Charles Frederick Whittlesey, A.W. Hayden
- Architectural style: Late Gothic Revival, Folk Gothic
- NRHP reference No.: 76001192
- NMSRCP No.: 383

Significant dates
- Added to NRHP: November 7, 1976
- Designated NMSRCP: June 20, 1975

First United Methodist Church is an historic Methodist church in downtown Albuquerque, New Mexico. The church was chartered in 1880 and the original building, constructed between 1880 and 1882, was the first church in New Town. By the turn of the century, the original sanctuary was found inadequate and was demolished. In 1904, a new sanctuary, now known as the Fellowship Hall, was built to replace this original adobe church on the same site. The architect was Charles Frederick Whittlesey and Tiffany-style windows were installed some short time after the completion of the building.

By 1955, this sanctuary itself was outgrown and so a larger sanctuary was built on the property. The building was added to the New Mexico State Register of Cultural Properties in 1975 and the National Register of Historic Places in 1976.
