= El Tovar Stables =

- U.S. National Register of Historic Places
- U.S. Historic district
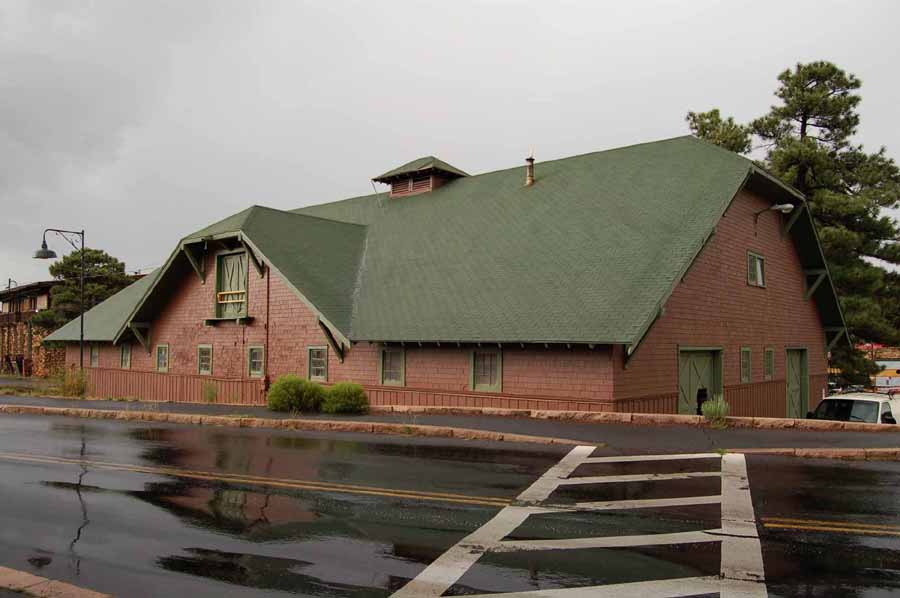

- Location within Arizona Location within the United States
- Location: Off Grand Canyon National Park Rte. 8A, Grand Canyon, Arizona
- Coordinates: 36°3′19″N 112°8′24″W
- Area: 7 acres (2.8 ha)
- Built: c.1904
- NRHP reference No.: 74000336
- Added to NRHP: September 6, 1974

The El Tovar Stables at the south rim of the Grand Canyon were built about 1904, at the same time the nearby El Tovar Hotel was built, to house the animals used in general transportation around the park. Collectively called the "transportation department" in the early 20th century, the three structures comprised a horse barn or stable, a mule barn and a blacksmith shop.

The horse barn is the largest of the structures. As it stands, it is about 140 feet (43 m) by 60 feet (18 m), having reportedly lost 40 feet (12 m) in length due to a fire at some point. The wood-frame structure is sheathed on the lower half with board-and-batten siding, with wood shingles on the upper half. The roof is covered in green asphalt shingles. The interior contains two main spaces, with an open room in the east that was probably used for wagons. The west side has two floors. The upper level was used for storage, and contains three rooms formerly used as storerooms. Downstairs are open stalls on one side and closed stalls on the other side. The building is topped by a large cupola.

The mule barn is similar to the horse barn but smaller, measuring about 90 feet (27 m) by 60 feet (18 m). The interior has an upper and lower level, disposed similarly to the horse barn, except the stalls are enclosed with open ends. The mule barn has a somewhat smaller cupola than the horse barn. The blacksmith shop is an L-shaped building with a main block of 50 feet (15 m) by 25 feet (7.6 m) and an extension that projects about 35 feet (11 m). The exterior appearance matches the other two buildings. The interior is divided into three rooms, one of which contains two blacksmith's forges.

The structures continue to be used to house and support the mule trains that take visitors and supplies to the Phantom Ranch at the bottom of the Grand Canyon. The barns and shop were listed on the National Register of Historic Places on September 6, 1974. They are also contributing components to the Grand Canyon Village Historic District, a National Historic Landmark District.
