= Forrester Building =

Building in Los Angeles, California

- U.S. Historic district – Contributing property
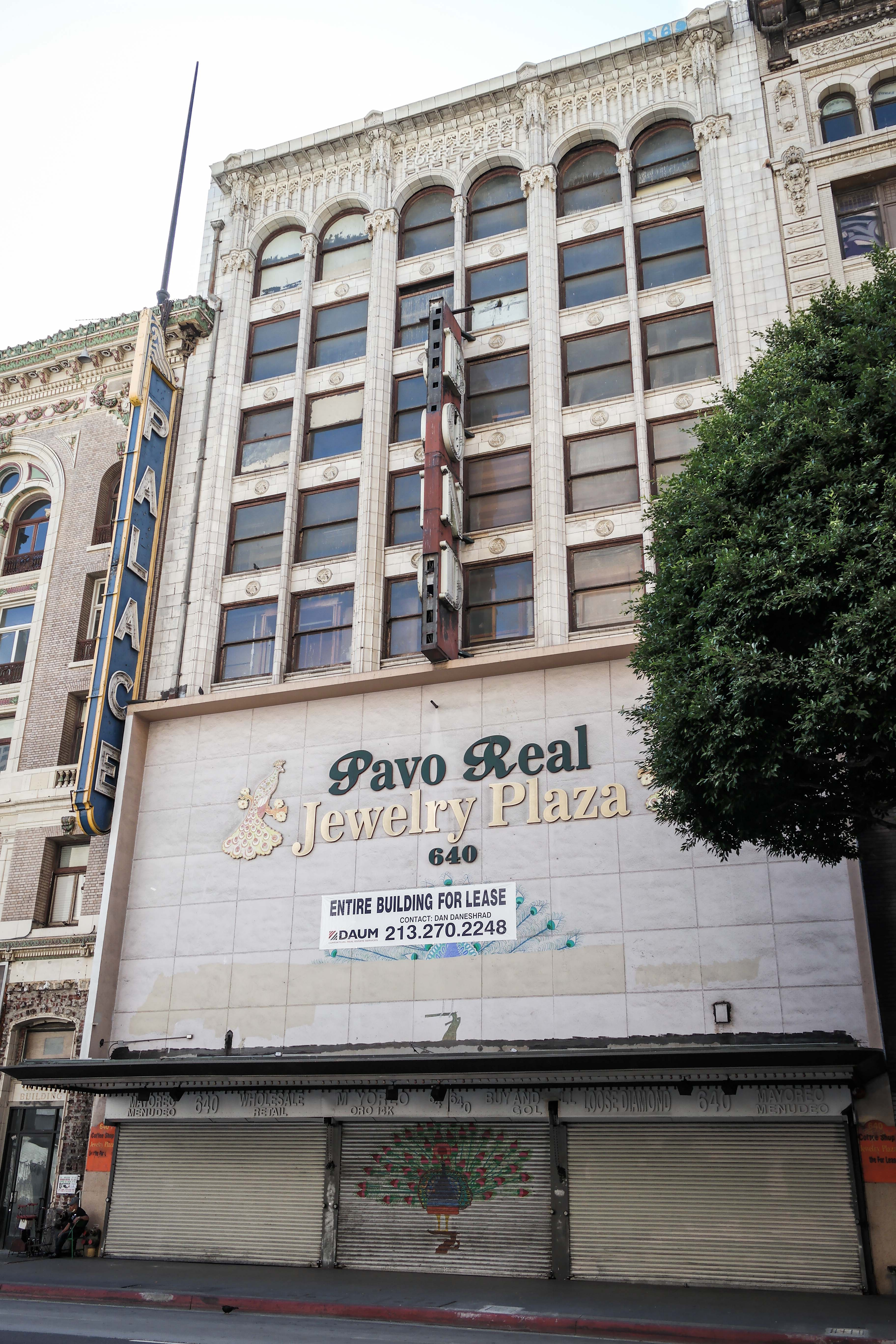
- The northern-half of the building in 2014

- Location within the Los Angeles metropolitan area
- Location: 638 S. Broadway, Los Angeles, California
- Coordinates: 34°02′45″N 118°15′09″W
- Built: 1907
- Architect: Charles Frederick Whittlesey
- Part of: Broadway Theater and Commercial District (ID79000484)
- Designated CP: May 9, 1979

Forrester Building is a historic eight-story building located at 638 S. Broadway in the Broadway Theater District in the historic core of downtown Los Angeles.

== History ==
Forrester Building was designed by Charles Frederick Whittlesey, built in 1907, and takes its name from the E.A. Forrester & Sons realty firm, who owned the building. The building originally contained lofts and ground-floor retail.

In 1979, the Broadway Theater and Commercial District was added to the National Register of Historic Places, with the Forrester Building listed as a contributing property in the district.

== Architecture and design ==
Forrester Building is made of reinforced concrete and features heavy cornice, arched windows, and a stone and terra cotta facade that covers the bottom three stories. The building is 56 feet (17 m) wide by 150 feet (46 m) deep.

== See also ==
- List of contributing properties in the Broadway Theater and Commercial District
