= Split-twig figurine =

Archaeological artifact

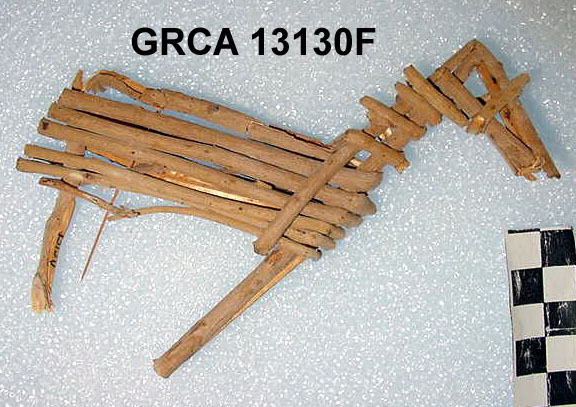
A split-twig figurine found in Grand Canyon National Park.

A split-twig figurine is one of many artifacts located around several Western states of the United States, specifically Arizona, Utah, Nevada and California. They are made from flexible wooden twigs, such as willow, and are split down the middle and wrapped carefully, usually into animal shapes. There are several variations in wrapping styles across the states, and are thought to have had various functions as well in past societies. They have been radiocarbon dated, among other techniques, to between 2,000 and 4,000 years ago. This places split-twig figurines around roughly the Archaic and Late Archaic era of North America.

== Types ==
There are two distinct styles of figurines, which served two different functions, one is considered to be religious or ritualistic (such as totems) and the other was possibly a children's toy. The term ‘totem’ by definition can vary, but as it is used by anthropologists, it is done so to show the natural object, such as a plant or animal, that a social group uses to identify its members. Also, the image or object that said group creates to symbolize their relationship with the natural species. In this case, the figurines are believed to symbolize animals within the geographic area in which they were found. There are two different styles of split-twig figurine construction; one named the Grand Canyon and the other the Green River. Since their discovery in the 1930s, more than 400 specimens were subsequently discovered from over 30 sites across the four western states. Radiocarbon dates have revealed that split-twig figurines were constructed for almost 1,700 years during the Late Archaic period in the Southwest. The different styles come from how they are made, specifically wrapped, and also other features, such as plant or animal material, or even other artifacts such as a small projectile point, which were inserted inside the figurine most likely sometime during its construction.

The plant material used in their construction does not determine the form or style of the figurine. It is the outermost wrappings of the figurine which determine the stylistic differences. Grand Canyon figurines have horizontal body wrappings, with vertical wrappings around the neck. Green River figurines have underlying horizontal body wraps which are overlain with vertical body wraps. The unsplit end of the twig forms the body core in Grand Canyon figurines, but becomes the back legs in the Green River style. A split at the neck or chest falls under Grand Canyon style, while a split at the backend of a figurine is Green River.

== Locations ==
=== Arizona ===
Split-twig figurines found in Arizona are given the category of Grand Canyon style, and are generally believed to function as social totems, and this is the area believed to be where spit-twig figurines were first discovered in the 1930s. It is also in this state in which many split-twig figurines overall have been discovered, with a higher quantity than other states. It has been speculated that this Grand Canyon style of figurines functioned as magico-religious totems for the hunter-gatherer societies of prehistoric North America. Bighorn sheep or extinct mountain goats are believed to be the animal symbolized in the split-twig figurines found in this area, and not only is it possible they were used to identify members of a group, but they played a religious role in acquiring a successful hunt of these animals. These figurines were not found associated with artifacts that are believed to be a part of daily living activities, such as a packed floor feature, or other food items, etc.

=== Utah ===
Split-twig figurines were discovered here in the 1930s as well, much like in Arizona, but their discovery was not published, and therefore made known to the public, until the 1960s. More were discovered in the 1990s. The style of split-twig figurines found in this geographic area were named the Green River, most likely for the river of the same name. These figurines were found in association with other materials that are considered by archaeologists to be a part of daily living, such as food debris or other items and indicators.

=== California ===
Split-twig figurines found in this area fall under the Green River style, and are considered to have been found in a domestic setting. However, this is debated as the figurines found here may have served a ritualistic function, given the associated artifacts found with them, and other features as well. These figurines are also believed to symbolize bighorn sheep, which were known to live in the area.
