= El Tovar Hotel =

NRHP building in Coconino County, Arizona

- U.S. National Register of Historic Places
- U.S. National Historic Landmark
- U.S. National Historic Landmark District – Contributing property
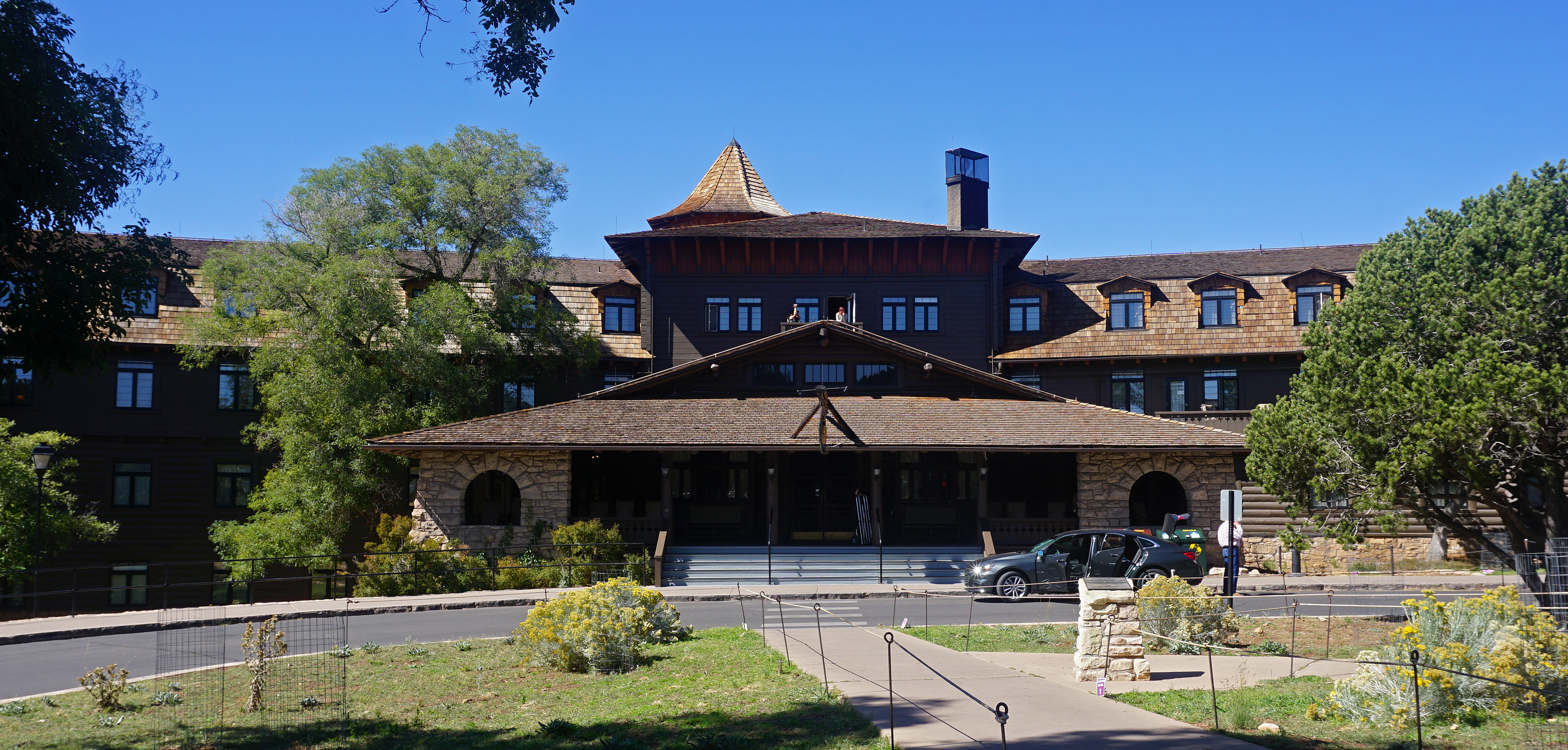
- In 2017

- Location within Arizona Location within the United States
- Location: Grand Canyon National Park, Rte. 8A, Grand Canyon, Arizona
- Coordinates: 36°03′27″N 112°08′14″W
- Area: 4.1 acres (1.7 ha)
- Built: 1905
- Architect: Charles Whittlesey
- Architectural style: Swiss Chalet; Norway Villa
- Part of: Grand Canyon Village Historic District (ID75000343)
- NRHP reference No.: 74000334

Significant dates
- Added to NRHP: September 6, 1974
- Designated NHL: May 28, 1987
- Designated NHLDCP: February 18, 1987

The El Tovar Hotel, also known simply as El Tovar, is a former Harvey House hotel situated directly on the south rim of the Grand Canyon in Grand Canyon National Park, Arizona, United States.

The hotel was designed by Charles Whittlesey, Chief Architect for the Atchison, Topeka, and Santa Fe Railway and was opened in 1905 as one of a chain of hotels and restaurants owned and operated by the Fred Harvey Company in conjunction with the Santa Fe railway whose Grand Canyon Depot was 100 metres (330 ft) away. It is at the northern terminus of the Grand Canyon Railway, which was formerly a branch of the Santa Fe Railroad.

The hotel is one of only a handful of former Harvey House facilities that are still in operation, and is an early example of the style that would evolve into National Park Service Rustic architecture. It has been a member of Historic Hotels of America, the official program of the National Trust for Historic Preservation, since 2012.

== History ==
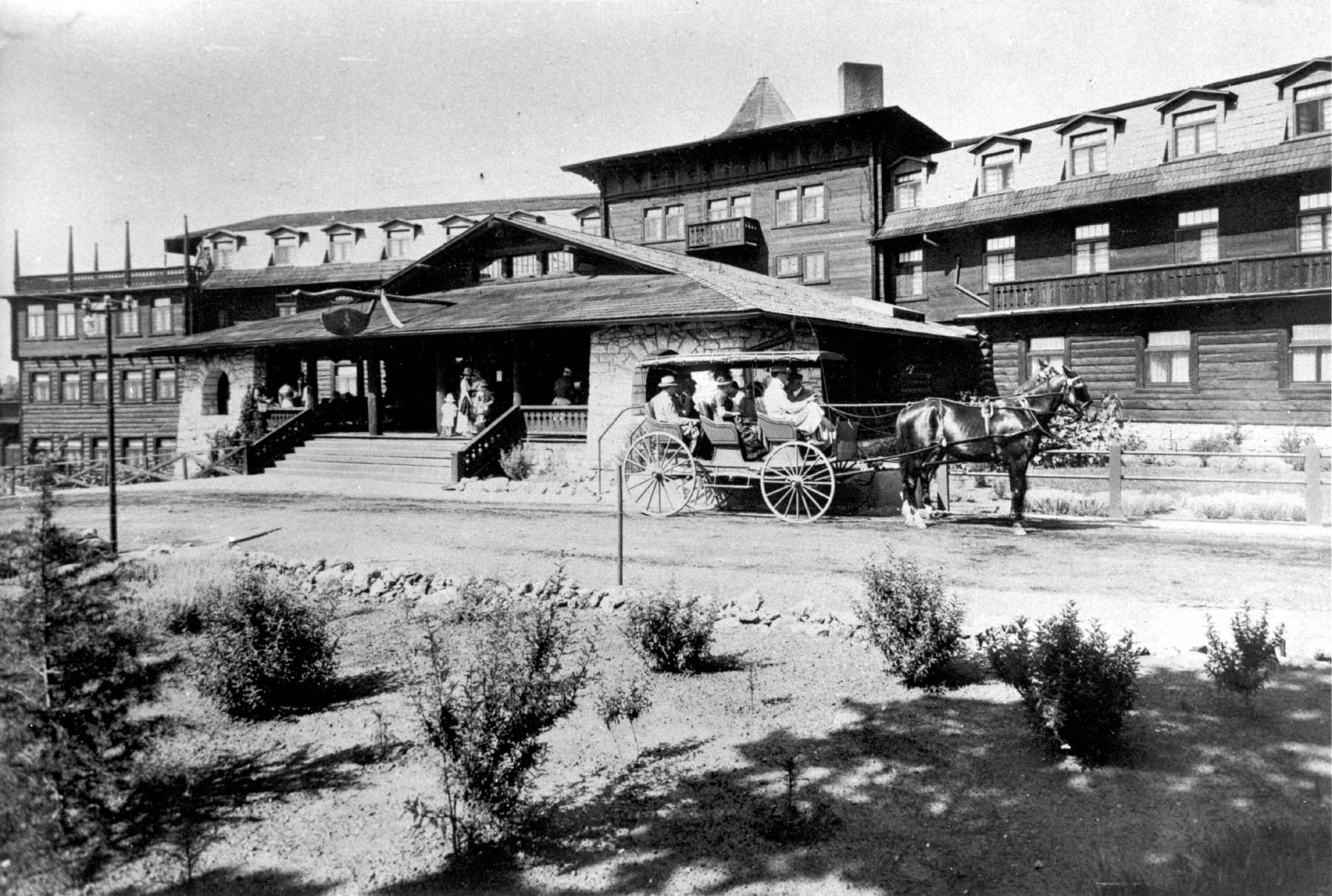
The El Tovar Hotel in the early 1900s

The hotel opened in 1905, before the Grand Canyon was a formally protected Federal park, soon after President Theodore Roosevelt's 1903 visit to the canyon. During that visit, Roosevelt said about the Grand Canyon:

I want to ask you to do one thing in connection with it in your own interest and in the interest of the country – to keep this great wonder of nature as it is now ...I hope you will not have a building of any kind, not a summer cottage, a hotel or anything else, to mar the wonderful grandeur, the sublimity, the great loveliness and beauty of the Canyon. Leave it as it is. You cannot improve upon it.

The hotel, which had been under design since 1902, was built the next year and opened in January 1905. The Grand Canyon Game Preserve was established by Roosevelt's executive order in 1906, expanding protections granted by President Benjamin Harrison in 1893. The Grand Canyon National Monument was proclaimed in 1908, and Grand Canyon National Park was finally established by Congress in 1919

The Santa Fe Railway initially planned for a relatively small hotel, but increased the size in view of increasing traffic to the Grand Canyon. The site was an area of 20 acres (8.1 ha) granted by the U.S. Government for use as a train terminal. The design was carried out by the railroad's architect Charles Whittlesey, of Topeka, Kansas, and was projected to cost $250,000 to build. Rejecting an initial plan to call it the "Bright Angel Tavern", the tradition of using Spanish names for Harvey House hotels was continued for the new hotel. Since the name of the first European to see the canyon, García López de Cárdenas, was given to an existing Harvey Hotel, the hotel was named after Pedro de Tovar, who had reported rumors of a large river in the area, inspiring the Cárdenas expedition.

The hotel was built as a "destination resort", providing a high level of comfort and luxury standing literally on the edge of the wilderness, 20 feet (6.1 m) from the rim of the canyon. The El Tovar was one of the first such hotels in national parks, part of a trend in which railroads would build large hotels in newly-accessible scenic locations like Yellowstone and Glacier National Parks, stimulating necessarily railborne tourist traffic to those destinations. The railroads consciously employed architectural design in keeping with the image they wished to convey: a superficially rustic resort offering a comfortable retreat.

Roosevelt returned to stay at the El Tovar in 1911, and again in 1913, writing a book about his 1913 trip.

== Description ==
The El Tovar was built from local limestone and Oregon pine. The lower portions of the building are mainly of log construction, yielding to lighter, smoother framed construction sheathed with planking for the upper levels. The roof is covered in shingles. The hotel is of variable height, with a two-story central portion, a north wing three stories tall, and a four-story south wing, the result of sloping land. A basement underlies the complex. The central section is 218 feet (66 m) long with a basement and main floor, with an axis running roughly parallel with the canyon rim. The lobby, behind a broad entry veranda, extends to four stories topped with a turret with a pyramidal roof. The guest room wings extend from this central section at a shallow angle, with their top floors extending only partway, creating roof decks. The third floor exterior is treated as a mansard, with projecting dormers with shallow gables. The hotel's entrance is on the side of the building with the canyon to the right, at a right angle to the railroad terminal directly across the street. The north wing runs toward the canyon, almost to its edge, ending in a porch overlooking the canyon. The south wing runs away from the canyon, ending in a semi-octagonal space once called the "grotto.". The dining room is to the rear of the lobby, with views of the canyon through its windows. Additions to this section of the building for kitchen and service areas have gradually expanded its footprint.

The eclectic character of the El Tovar's exterior is magnified on the interior, where the rustic Western-Swiss theme collides with elements of the Mission style, accented with Arts and Crafts Movement furnishings and southwestern Indian accents and motifs. The central "rotunda" of the lobby features Swiss-inspired cutout wood railings framed by peeled log posts, all varnished a dark brown, set against Southwestern-pattern carpets. A breakfast room was described in early promotional literature as "tastefully decorated in fifteenth-century style" while other areas had "trophies of the chase." Relatively few of these original decorations remain, with a greater present emphasis on Southwestern themes. Many of the original Arts and Crafts furniture pieces have been replaced or dispersed.

There were originally 103 guest rooms and 21 guest bathrooms, now 78 guest rooms, all with private bath. Rooms arranged on either side of central corridors through the wings. A large-scale renovation was completed in 1983, in which the original paired wood casement windows were replaced with dark brown anodized aluminum units, with decorative mullions on the single-light units.

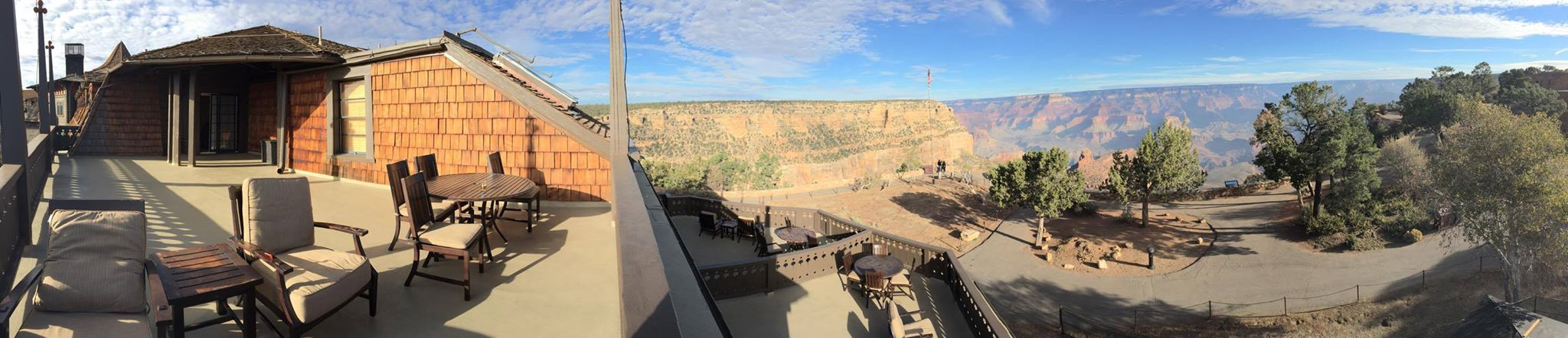

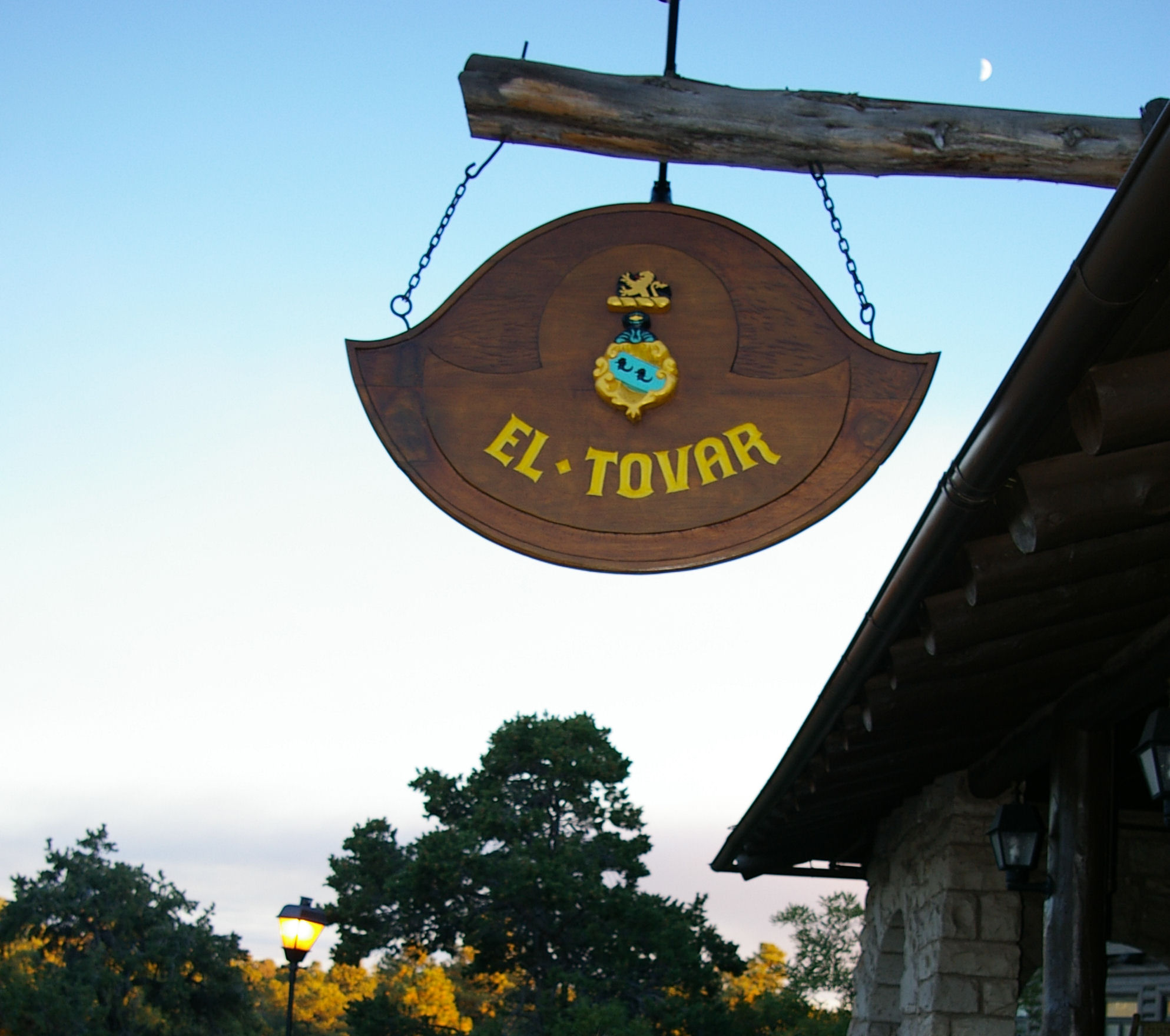
Sign at the main entrance

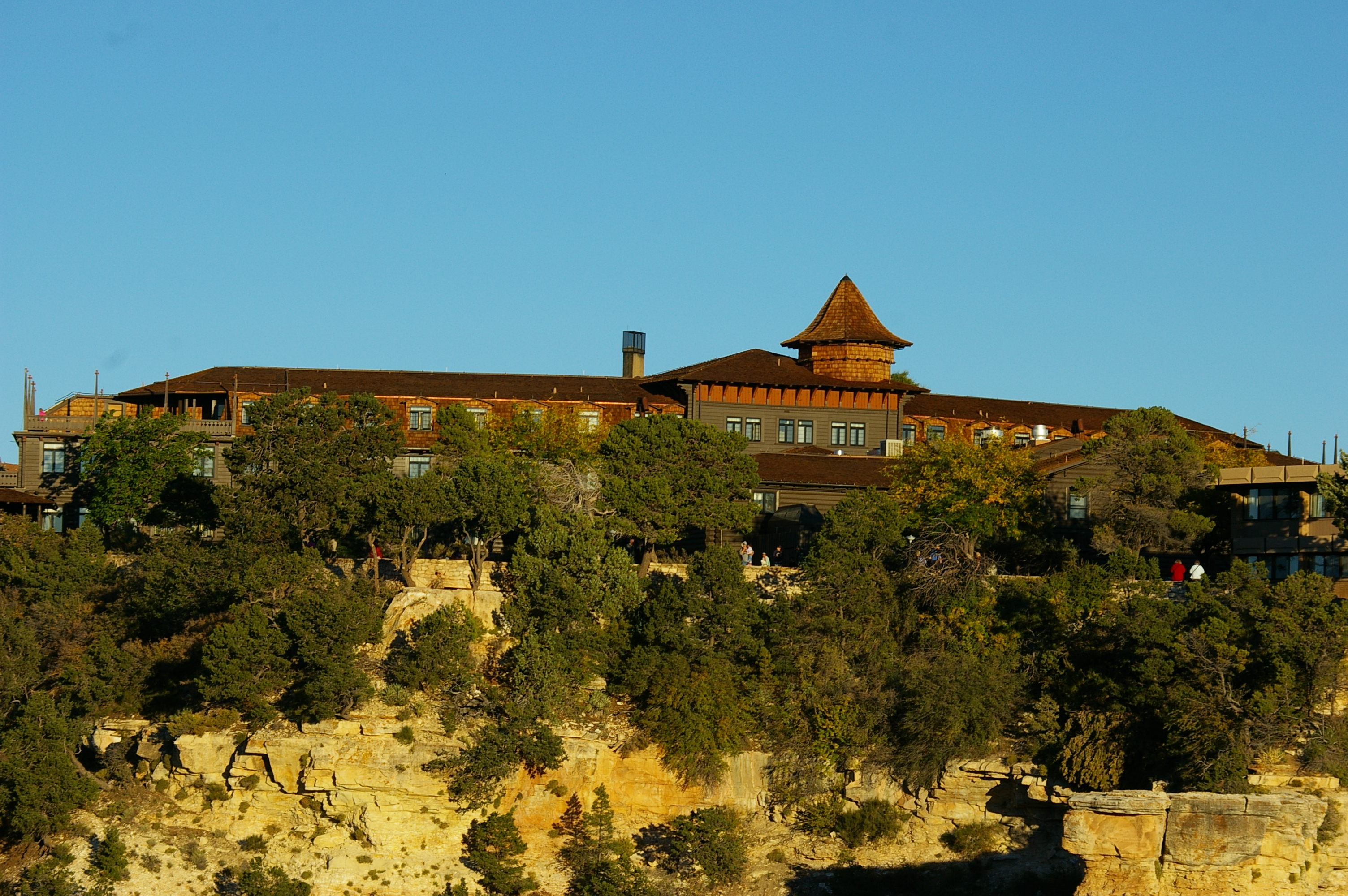
Rear of the El Tovar on the edge of the Grand Canyon

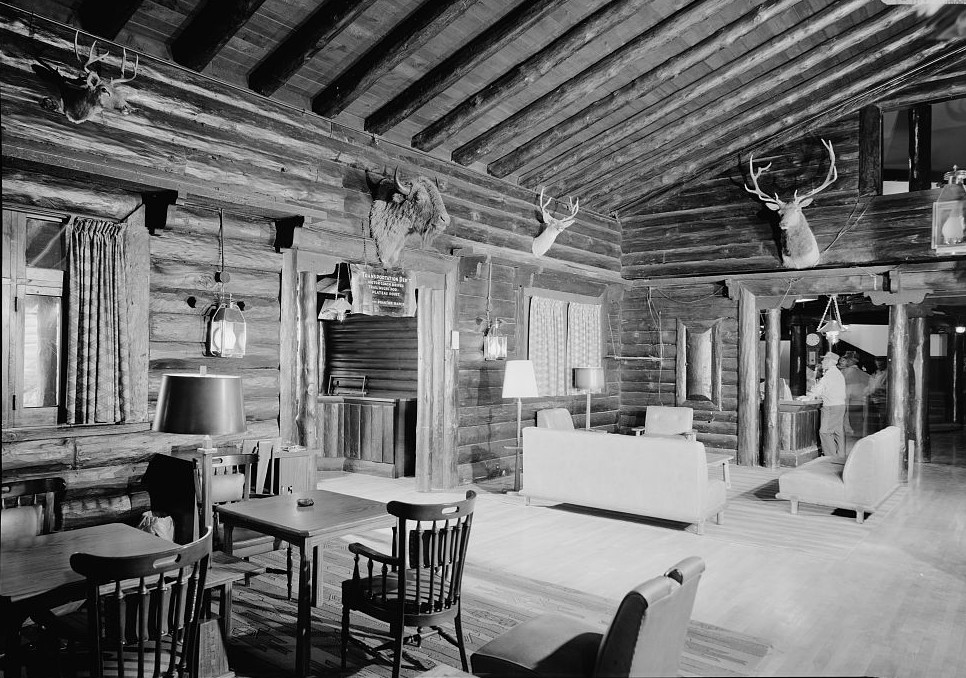
El Tovar lobby

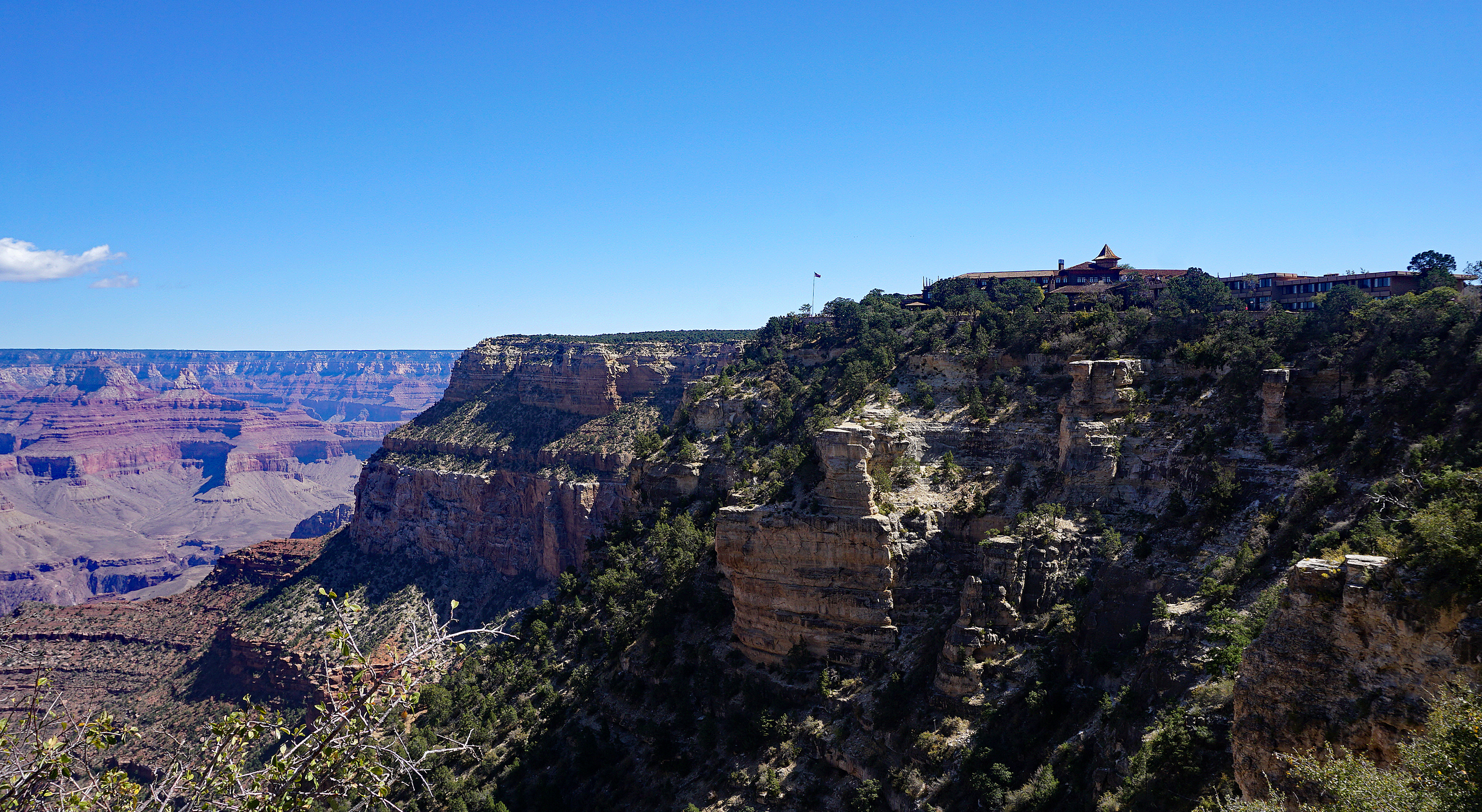
El Tovar location at the Grand Canyon south rim

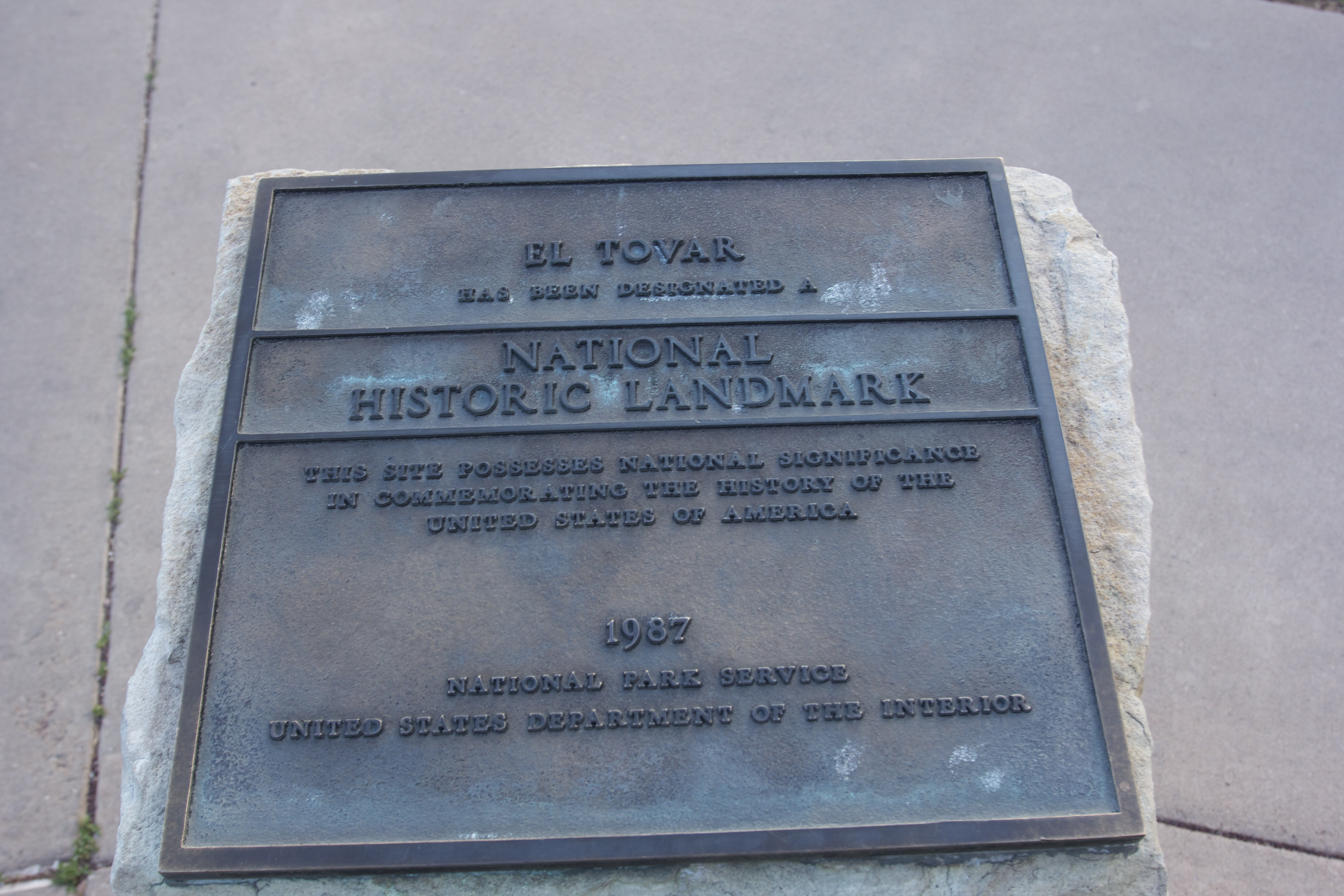
El Tovar National Historic Landmark plaque

== Historic designations ==
The El Tovar was placed on the National Register of Historic Places on September 6, 1974. It was declared a National Historic Landmark on May 28, 1987. The hotel is a major component of the Grand Canyon Village Historic District, which encompasses the historic portions of the South Rim development, including visitor attractions designed by Mary Colter, the Bright Angel Lodge and significant Park Service support facilities, typically designed in a consistent rustic style. The NRHP-listed El Tovar Stables are nearby.
