= Charles Frederick Whittlesey =

American architect

Charles Frederick Whittlesey (1867–1941) was an American architect best known for his pioneering work in reinforced concrete and for his individual works throughout the American southwest.

== Life ==
Born in Alton, Illinois, Whittlesey was a draftsman for Louis Sullivan before opening his own Chicago practice. Many of Whittlesey's major commissions show Sullivan's influence.

In 1900, at the age of 33, Whittlesey was appointed Chief Architect for the Atchison, Topeka, and Santa Fe Railway. Among many other stations and hotels for the railroad, he designed the El Tovar Hotel, the former Harvey House situated just 20 ft from the south rim of the Grand Canyon in Arizona, United States. It stands at the northern terminus of the Grand Canyon Railway, formerly a branch of the Santa Fe. The hotel is one of only a handful of Harvey House facilities still in operation, and is an example of National Park Service Rustic architecture. The razed Alvarado Hotel in Albuquerque, New Mexico was also his design, with interior work done by Mary Colter.

Whittlesey moved to San Francisco in 1907 and worked mainly there and in Los Angeles, becoming known for his early work in reinforced concrete.

== Family ==
Whittlesey's son Austin C. Whittlesey (1893–1950) was also an architect, apprenticed in the office of Bertram Goodhue for seven years, and was active in Southern California in the 1930s. While working as staff designer for Allison & Allison he designed the 1930 Southern California Edison Building, across the street from Goodhue's L.A. Public Library. His daughter, Enid Caroline Whittlesey (1895–1981), was murdered in Los Angeles; the cold case investigation was featured on the TV series Forensic Files (Season 7, episode 32).

== List of works ==
=== Albuquerque, New Mexico ===
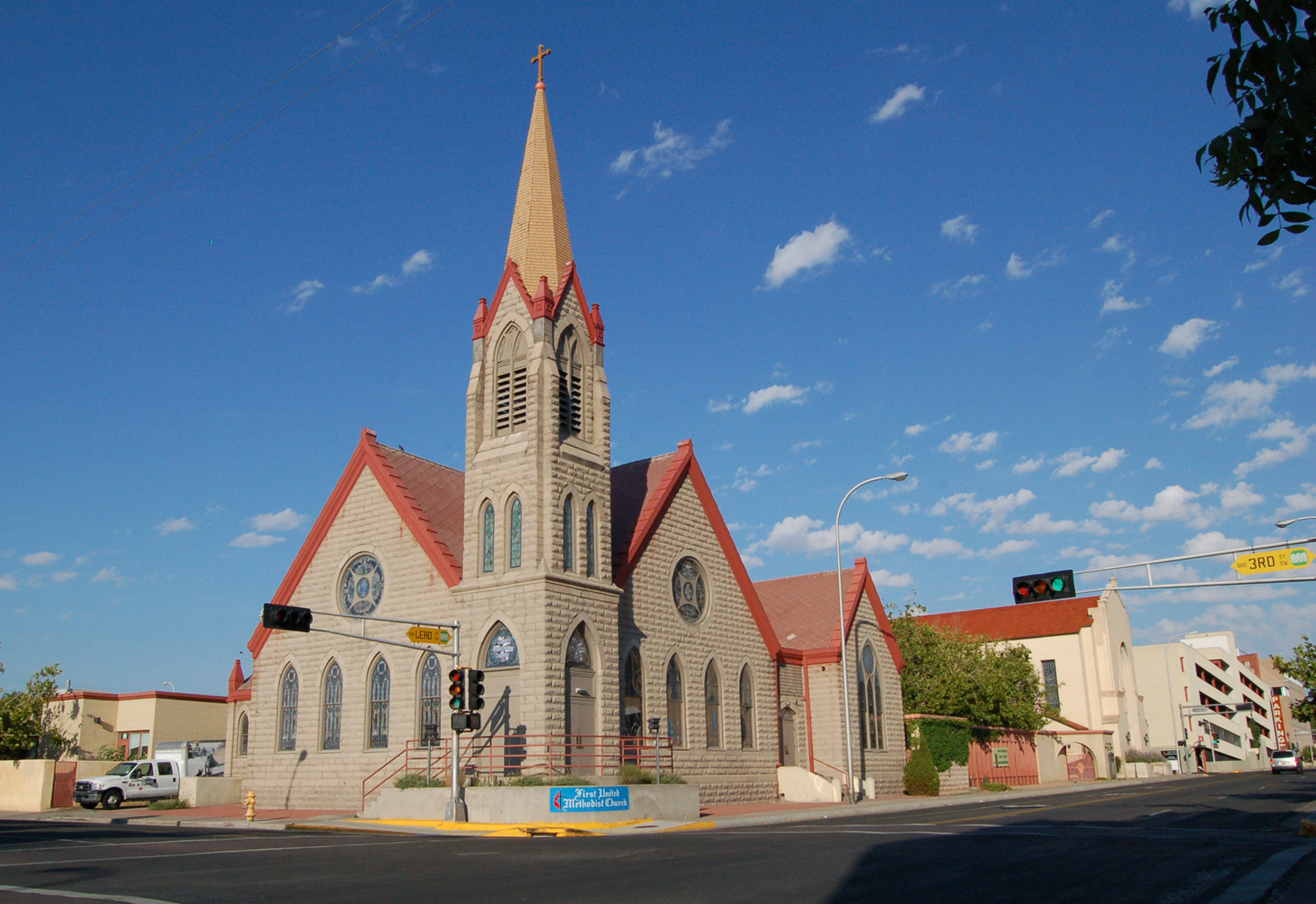
First Methodist Episcopal Church

- Alvarado Hotel (1902), formerly NRHP-listed interior by Mary Colter (razed)
- Whittlesey House (1903), NRHP-listed
- First Methodist Episcopal Church (1904), NRHP-listed

=== California ===
==== Los Angeles ====
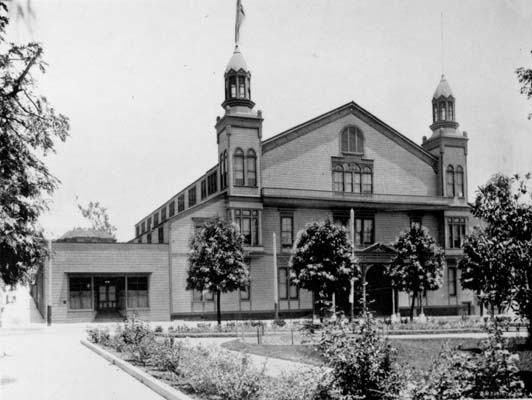
Clune's Auditorium

- Clune's Auditorium (1905–06)
- Hotel Hayward (1905), NRHP-listed
- Forrester Building (1907), NRHP-listed
- Lycurgus Lindsay House (1908)
- El Rey Hotel (1923)
- Mayflower Hotel (1927)

==== San Francisco ====
- Pacific Building (1907)
- Hueter Building (1908)
- Apartment building at 1230-38 Taylor Street (1909)
- Seven historic houses in the Russian Hill District (1910–1913), NRHP-listed

==== Elsewhere ====
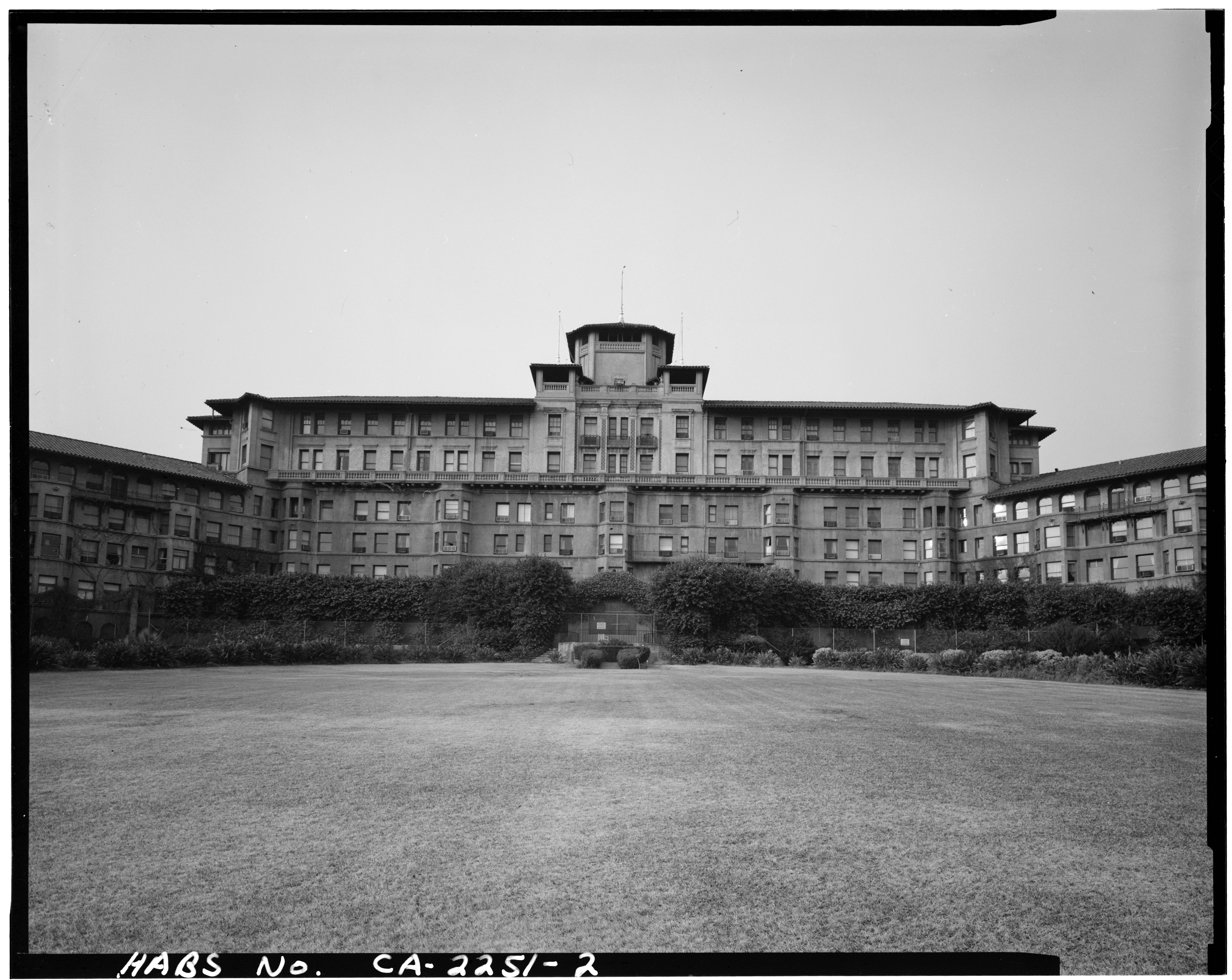
Hotel Wentworth

- Santa Fe Railroad Depot (1903), Berkeley
- Hotel Wentworth (1907), Pasadena, reworked by Myron Hunt
- Old Student Union (1915), Stanford
- Leiman House (1921), Berkeley

=== Arizona ===
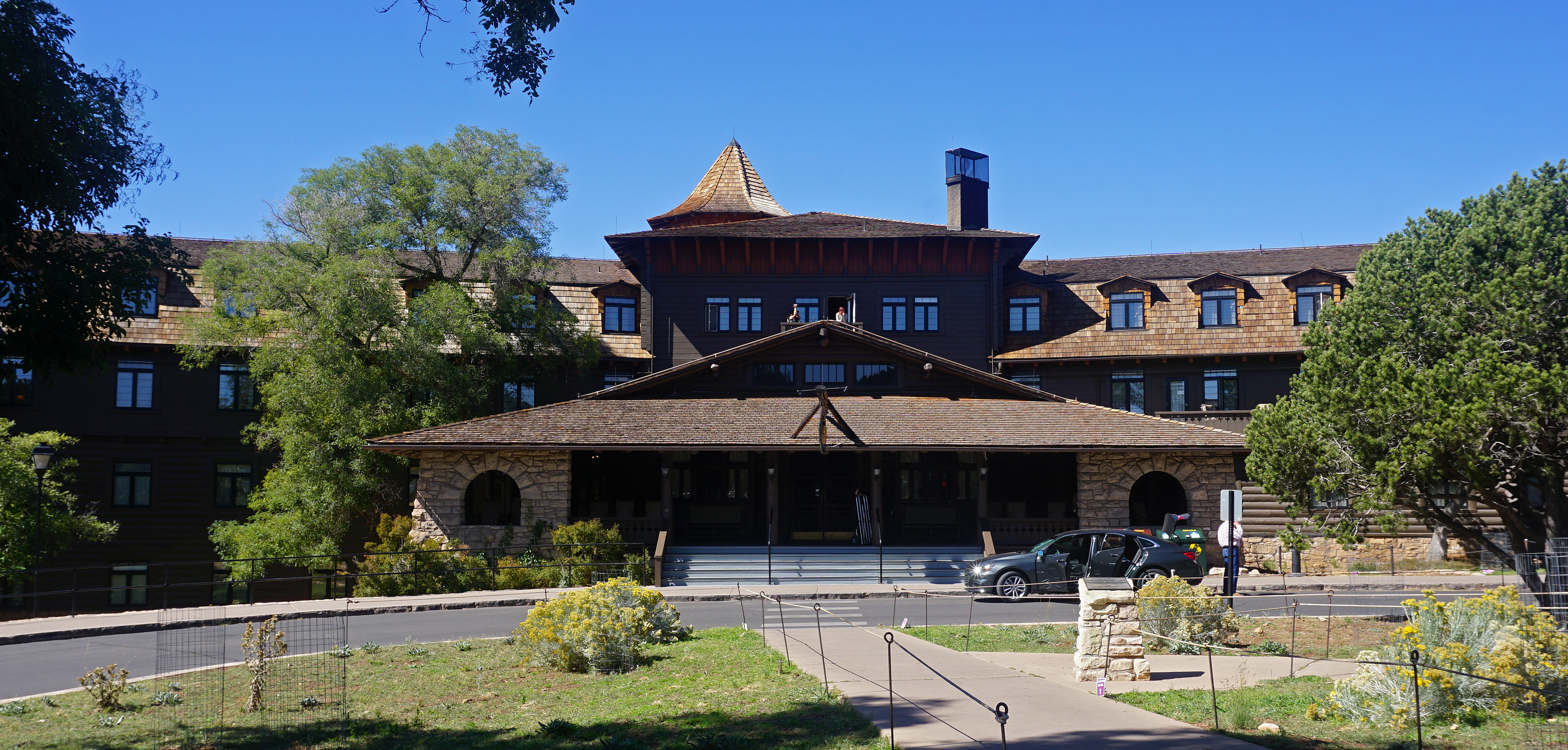
El Tovar Hotel

- Riordan family homes (1904), Flagstaff
- George Babbitt home (1904), Flagstaff (burned down c. 1960)
- El Tovar Hotel (1905), Grand Canyon, NRHP-listed

=== Elsewhere ===
- Central School (1897), Riverside, Illinois
- Santa Fe Railroad Depot (1904), Shawnee, Oklahoma
