= List of historic properties in Pine-Strawberry, Arizona =

- CDP
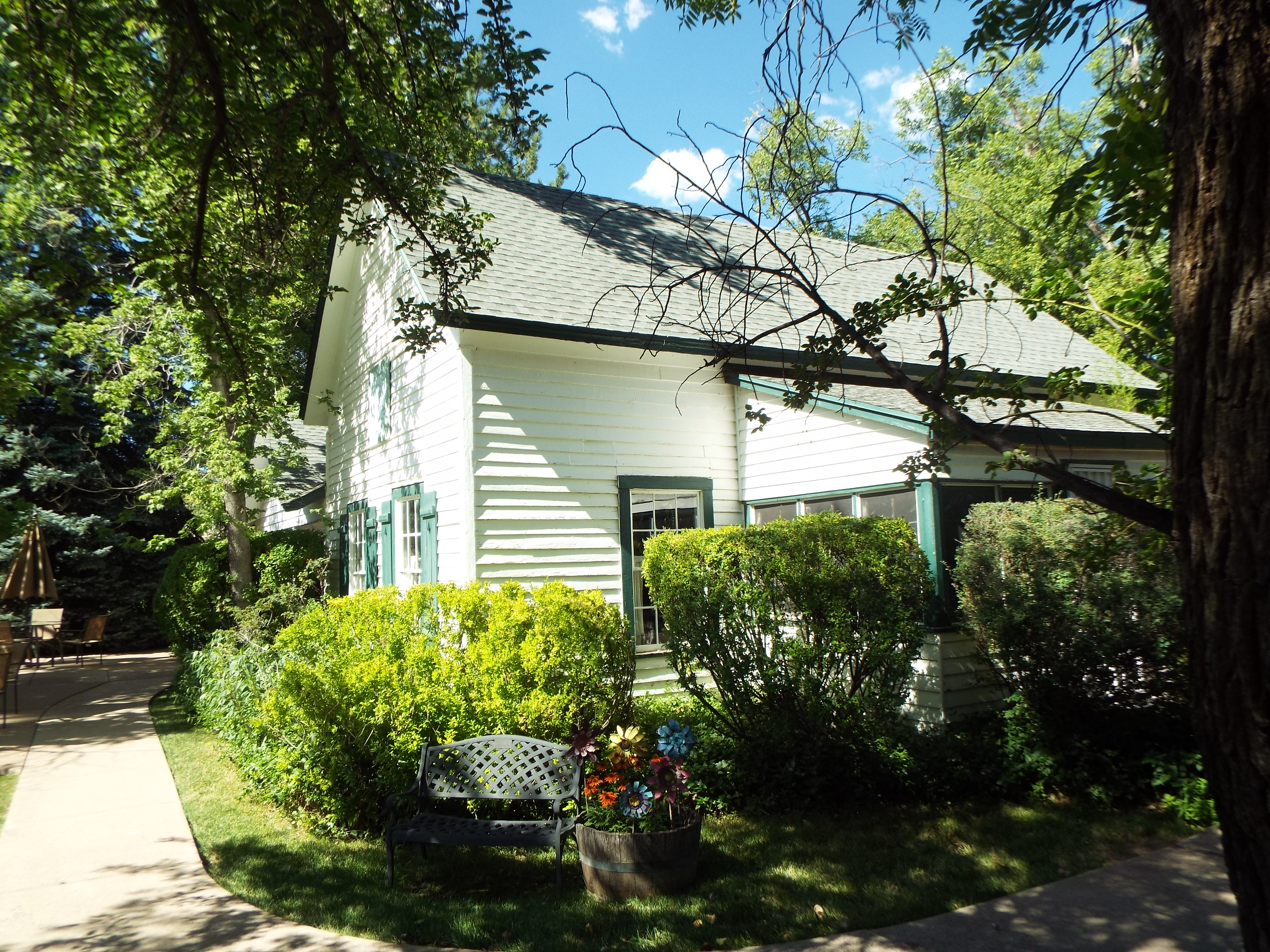
- The Alfred Jason Randall House

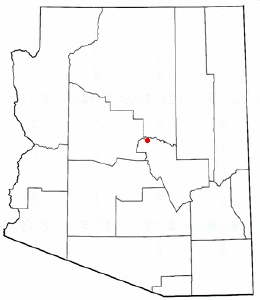
- Location of Pine-Strawberry in Arizona
- Coordinates: 34°23′4″N 111°27′18″W

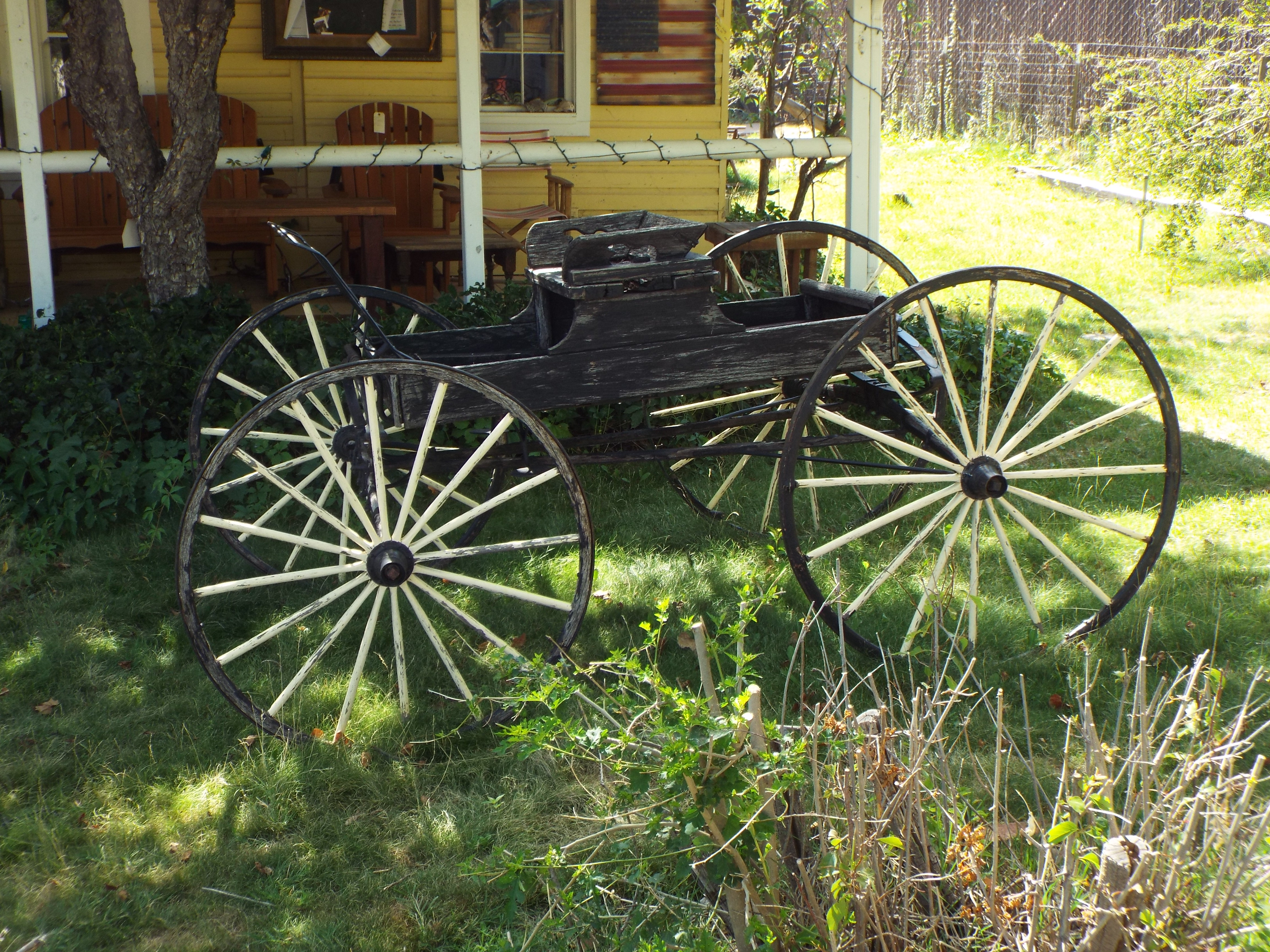
The Leavitt Family Carriage

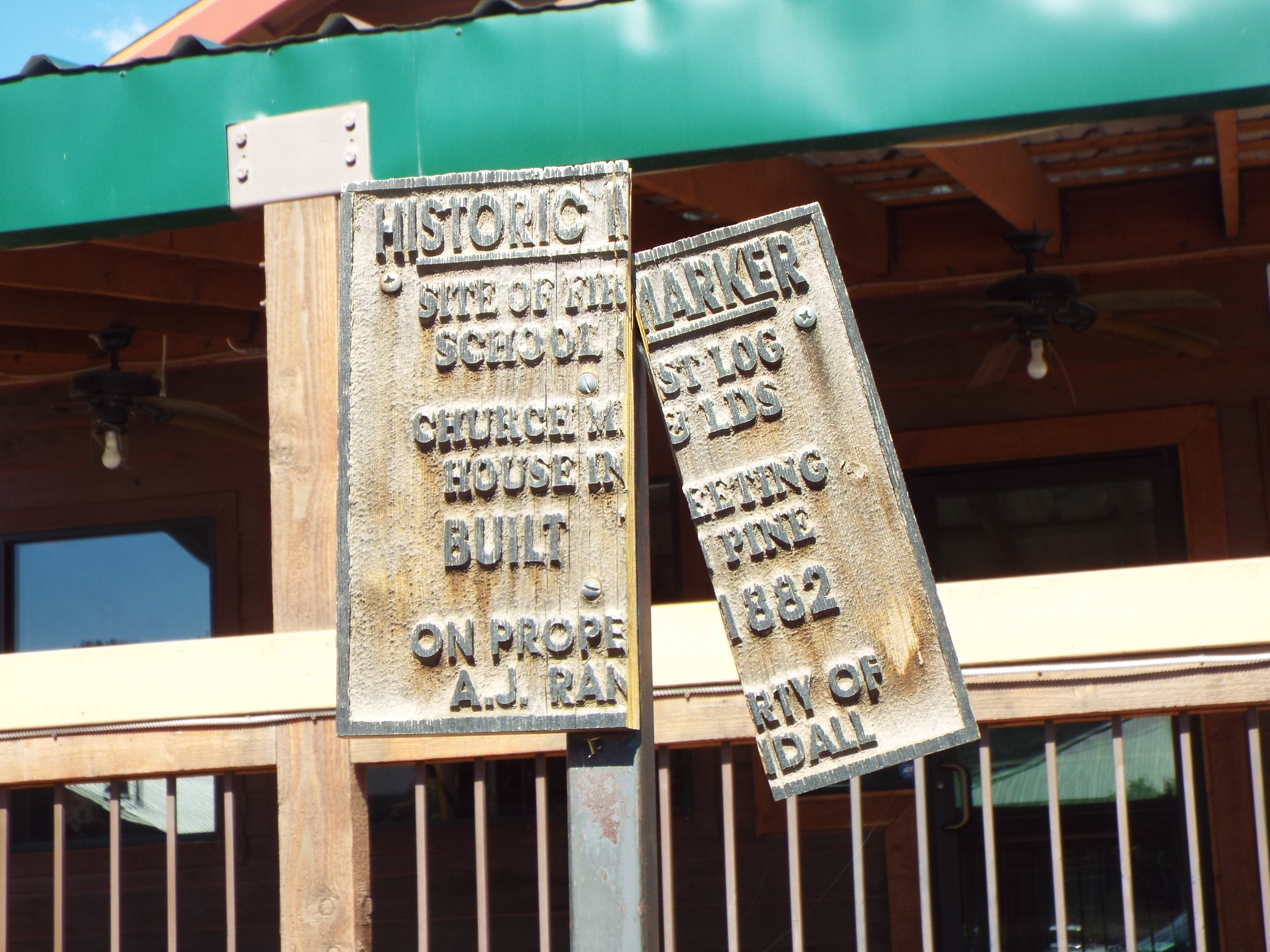
Location of the first log School in Pine

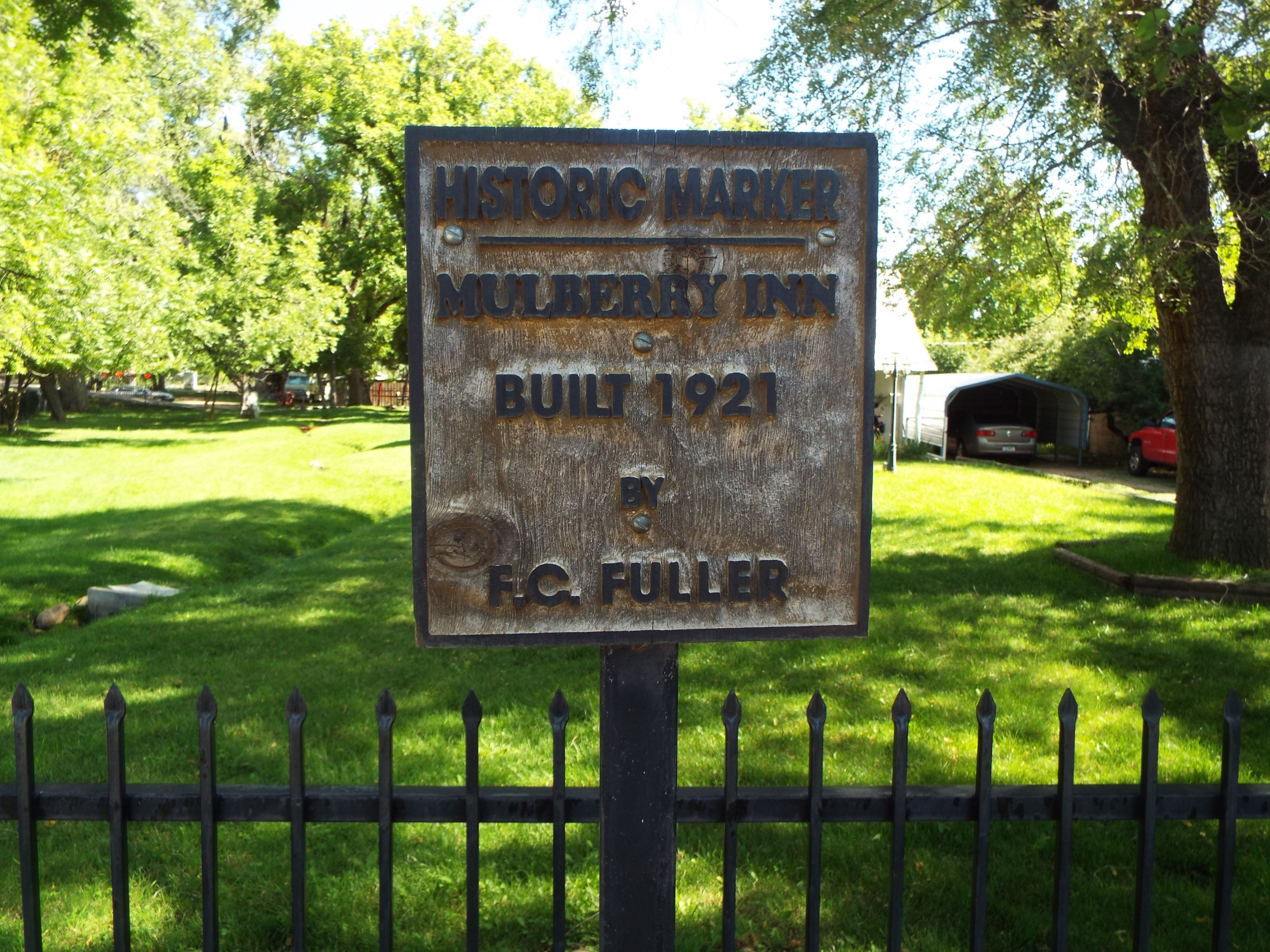
Mulberry Inn Marker

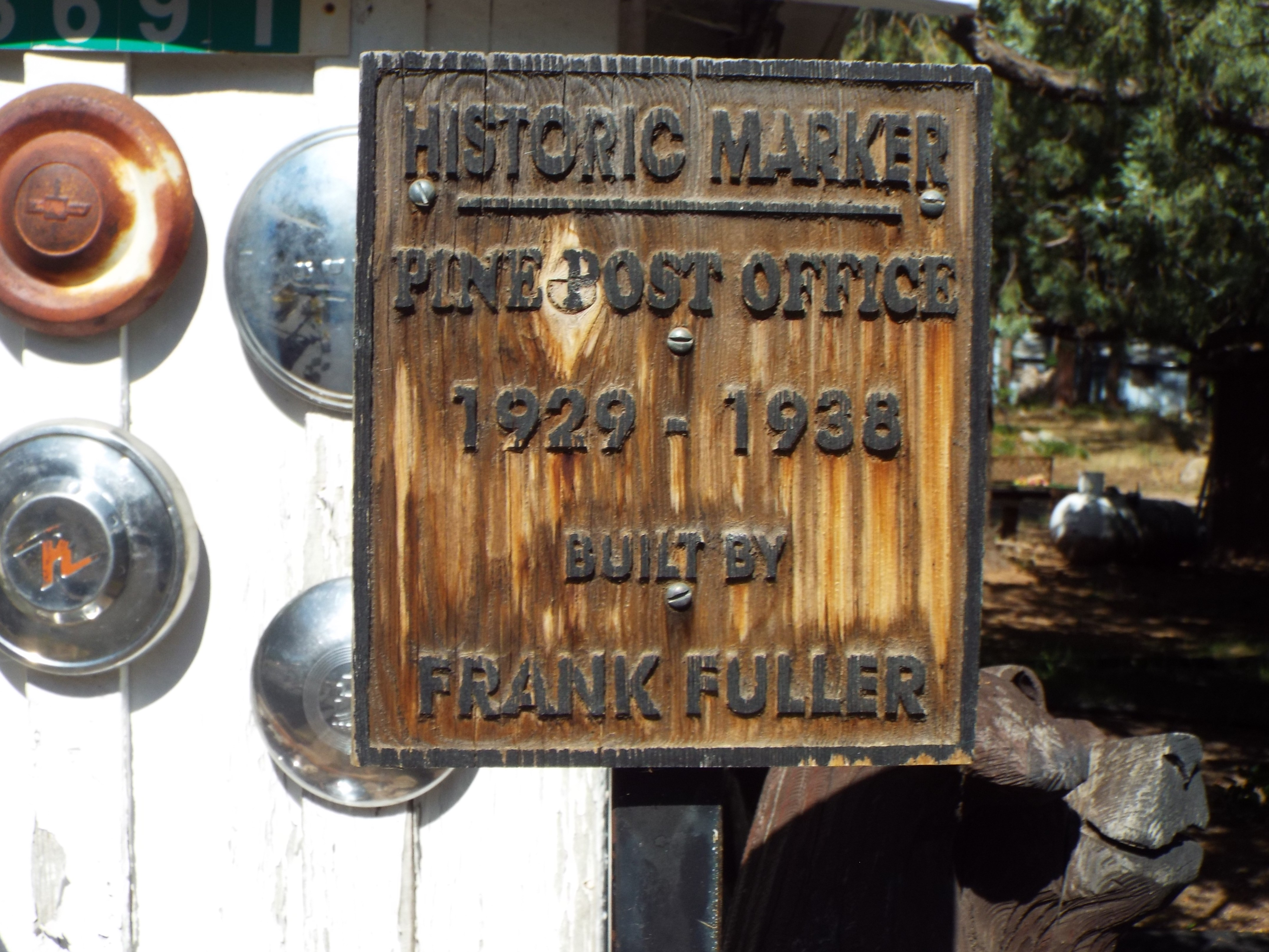
Pine Post Office Marker

This is a list of historic properties in Pine-Strawberry a census-designated region in north-central Arizona, located below the Mogollon Rim in Gila County. Included is a photographic gallery of some of the remaining historic structures some of which are individually identified as historic by the National Register of Historic Places. .

== Brief history ==
According archeologists the ruins found in the area where Pine-Strawberry are located were once inhabited by an early Native-American tribe called the Anasazi. Ruins of an ancient Anasazi village was discovered and rebuilt in Pine. Later the area was inhabited by the Tonto Apaches and Yavapai tribes.

Armed American soldiers began to arrive in the area during the American Civil War. The soldiers were led by General George Crook, who built roads and established trails while forcing the natives out of the area. In 1867, the US Army declared that the Native-Americans who were not employed as scouts or living within the boundaries of the Colorado River Reservation to be "hostile," and began their campaign of capture or extermination. The area continued to be uninhabited until 1875, when gold was discovered in the area resulting in an influx of Anglo-American settlers.

From 1878 to 1890, members of the Mormon faith settled the area and gave Strawberry its name. This was due to the fact that there were numerous wild strawberries in the area. Among the early pioneers to arrive in 1879, were the Bunch Family, "Cowboy" John Hicks and John Duncan, Henry Siddles, Price W. Nelson Family and the John Pleasant Hough Family.

Alfred J. Randall and Rial Allen purchased land in Pine Valley. They named the area Pine because of the huge pine trees which surrounded their new acquired land By 1881, there were thirteen families residing in Pine Valley. They filed for water rights and built a diversion dam across Pine Creek. They then funneled the water into a ditch and divided the home sites among themselves.

In 1885, John Wingfield and Charles Callaway were among the Mormons who hauled and shaped the big pine logs which were used to build Strawberry's first log Schoolhouse. During the following years the school would also serve as a meeting place, social center and church. The schoolhouse, which is located on 9318 Fossil Creek Rd., was listed in the National Register of Historic Places on May 10, 2005, reference: #05000422. A one-room log schoolhouse was built in Pine in 1882, on the land donated by pioneer A. J. Randall. In 1884, the Pine post office was established and Mary D. Fuller was named postmaster In 1928,

== Pine-Strawberry Archaeological and Historical Society ==
According to the "Mission Statement" the mission of the Pine-Strawberry Archaeological and Historical Society is the following: "The Pine-Strawberry Archaeological and Historical Society is dedicated to collecting and preserving significant material and information about the historical and archaeological heritage of Pine, Strawberry, and the surrounding areas. We also interpret these materials and disseminate this information through its museums, programs and publications."

The building where the Pine-Strawberry Museum is housed was built in 1917 and once served the Mormon community as the Church of Jesus Christ of Latter Day Saints, or "The LDS Chapel." It is located on 3886 AZ-87 and now houses the Pine-Strawberry Historical Society (PSHS)

== Historic houses and church (Chapel) in Pine which are pictured ==
Pictured are the following historic structures in Pine, most of which have been converted into commercial stores:

- The William Stark House and Store – built in 1881. William came to Pine with the Lazears. He married Frances Fuller.
- The Frank C. Randall House – built in 1901.
- The Bert D. Randall House – built in 1905. Bert was the first white male born in Pine.
- The Alfred Jason Randall House – built in 1882. This property is located on State Route 87 and was listed in the National Register of Historic Places on September 29, 2000, reference: #00001165.
- The Lyman Leavitt House – built in 1887. Leavitt served as bishop of the Pine ward.
- The Pryor Miller House – built in 1888. Pryor Miller was a teacher, cattleman and landholder. He donated the land where in 1881 the Pine Cemetery was established. The house is located at 3800 State Route 87 and was listed in the National Register of Historic Places on March 10, 2004, reference: #04000146.
- The John Lazear House – built in 1881.
- The Pine Car Agency (Ford) with garage – built in 1932–33 by Alfred E. and Mel Randall. The structure has been converted into a family residence.
- The Church of Jesus Christ of LDS Chapel – Church Bishop Isaac Hunt was an expert carpenter. When he returned from his mission in 1917, he began building the chapel which was finally completed in 1920. Listed in the National Register of Historic Places as part of the Pine Community Center Historic District on February 24, 2005, reference: #05000068. Listed in the National Register of Historic Places as part of the Pine Community Center Historic District on February 24, 2005, reference: #05000068.
- The LDS Meeting House – built in 1882.
- The Church of Jesus Christ of LDS Cultural Hall – built in 1928–29.
- Pine High School – built in 1925.
- The Pine Post Office – built in 1929 by Frank C. Fuller. Fuller was the first postmaster in Pine to take the examination and receive appointment from Washington. He served as such until 1938. His son turned the post office into a gas station.
- The Mulberry Inn built in 1921 by Frank C. Fuller was the first tourist accommodation in Pine-Strawberry.

Not pictured is the historic is the 1927 Hunsaker House which was demolished.

=== Images ===
Houses and church (Chapel) in Pine

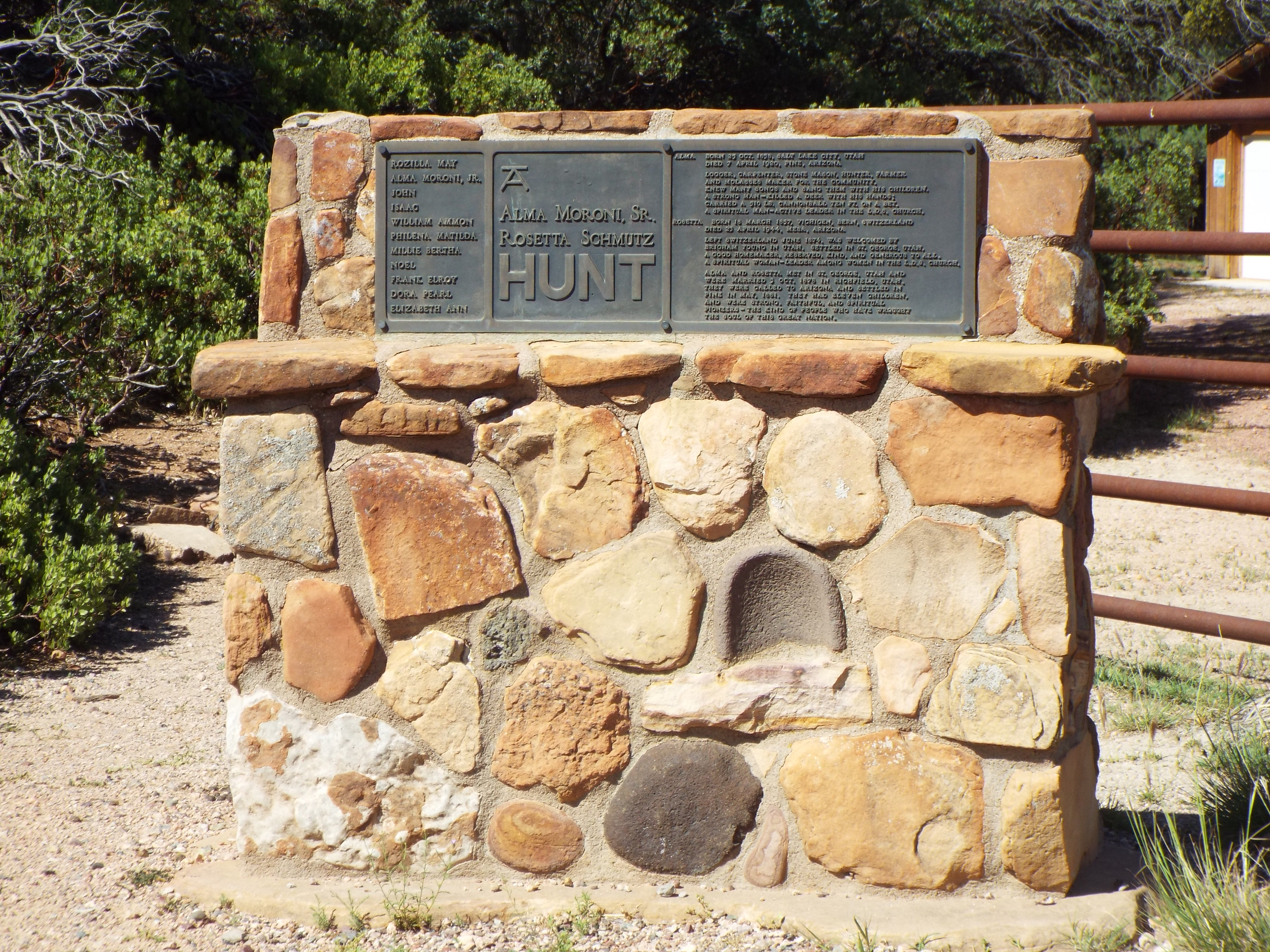
The Hunt Family Home Marker

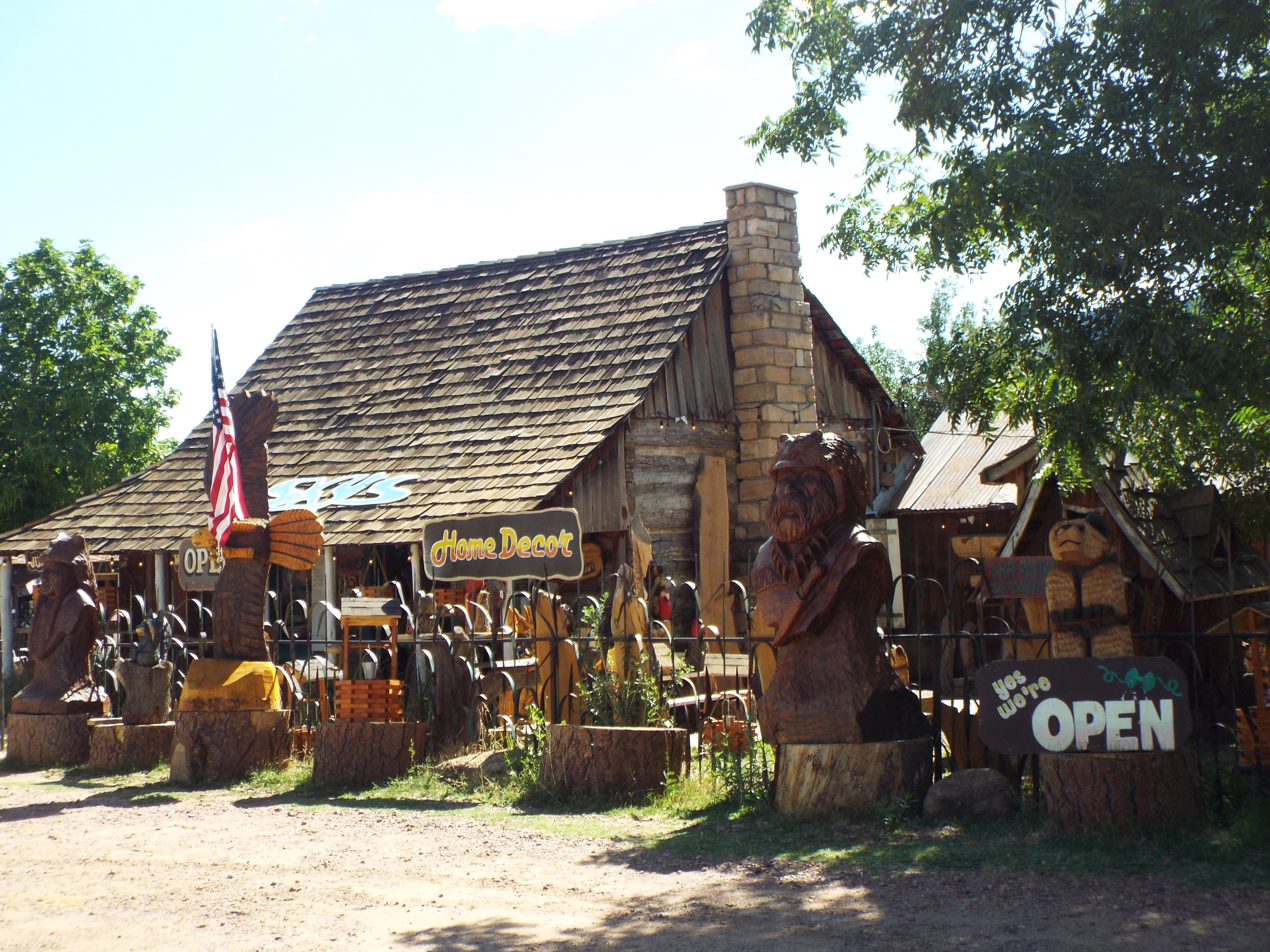
The William Stark House and Store

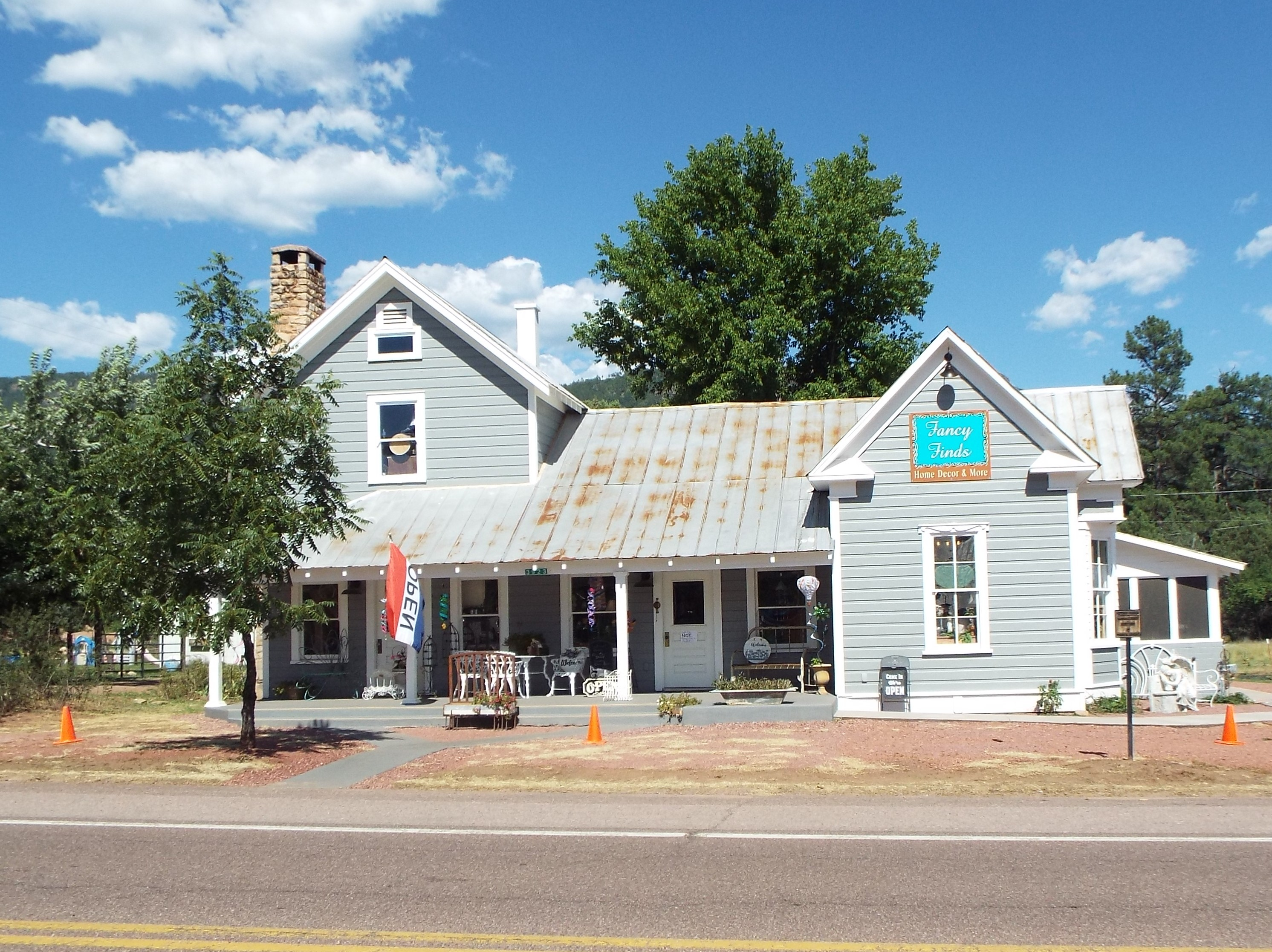
The Frank C. Randall House

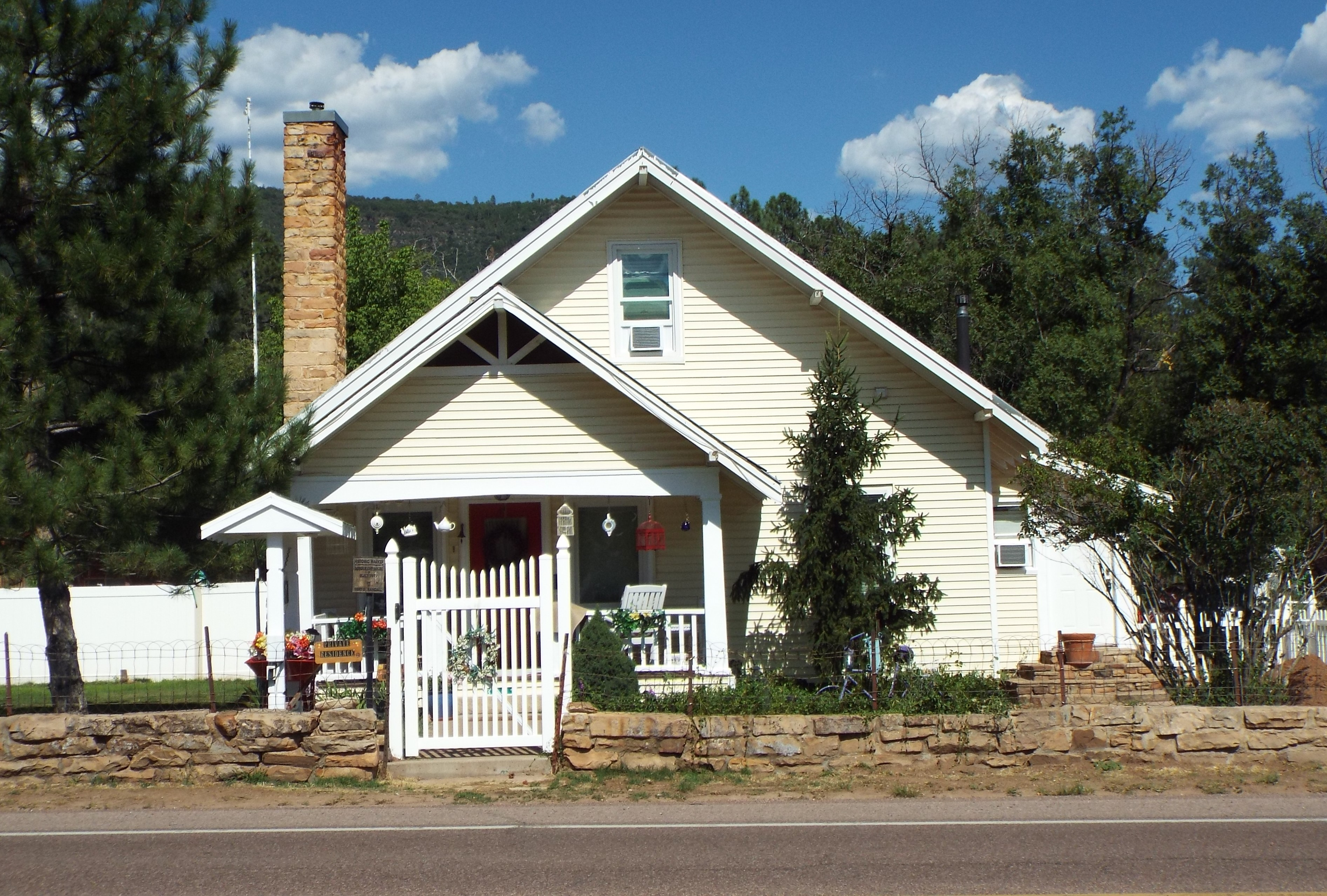
The Bert D. Randall House

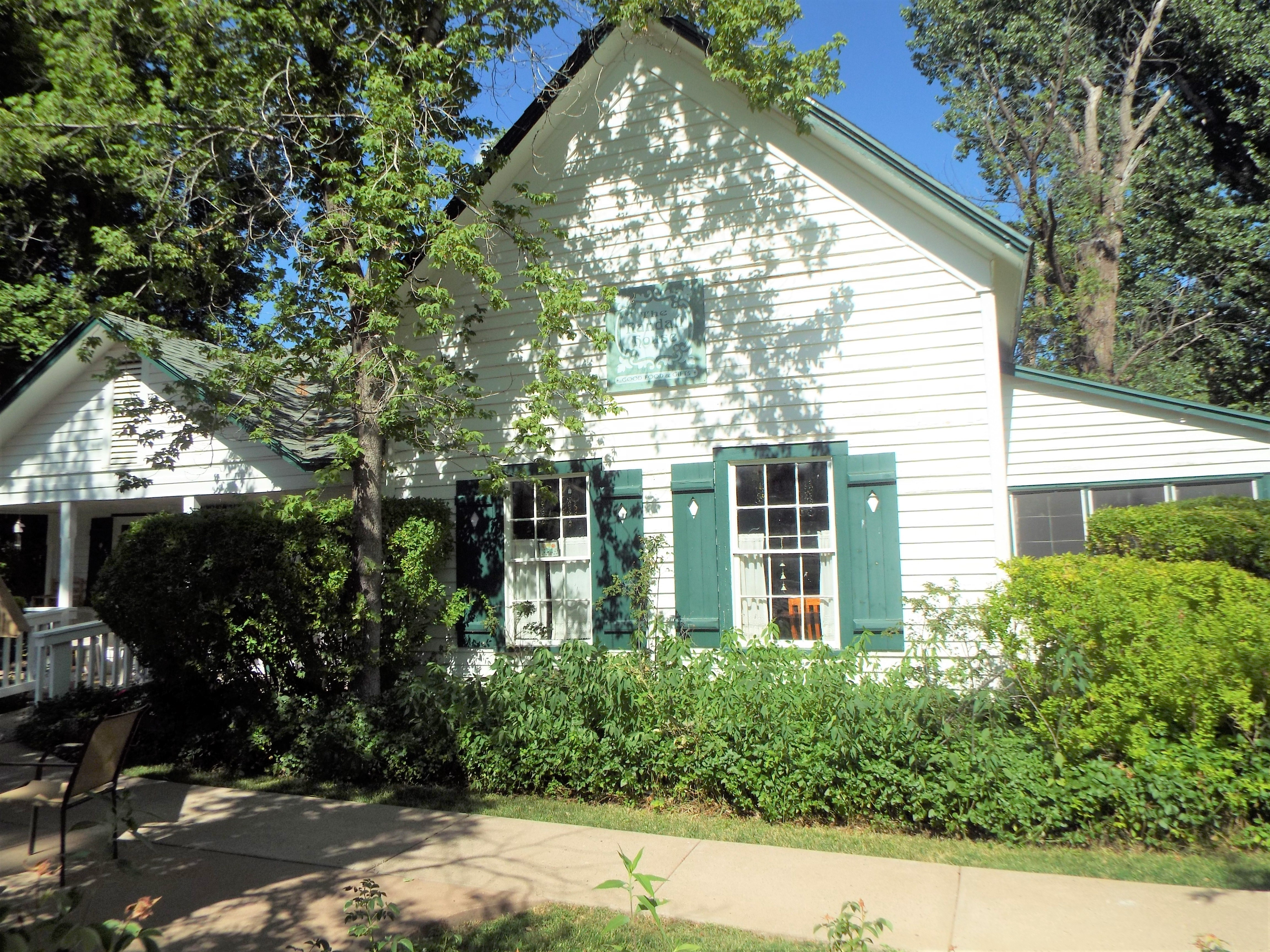
The Alfred Jason Randall House

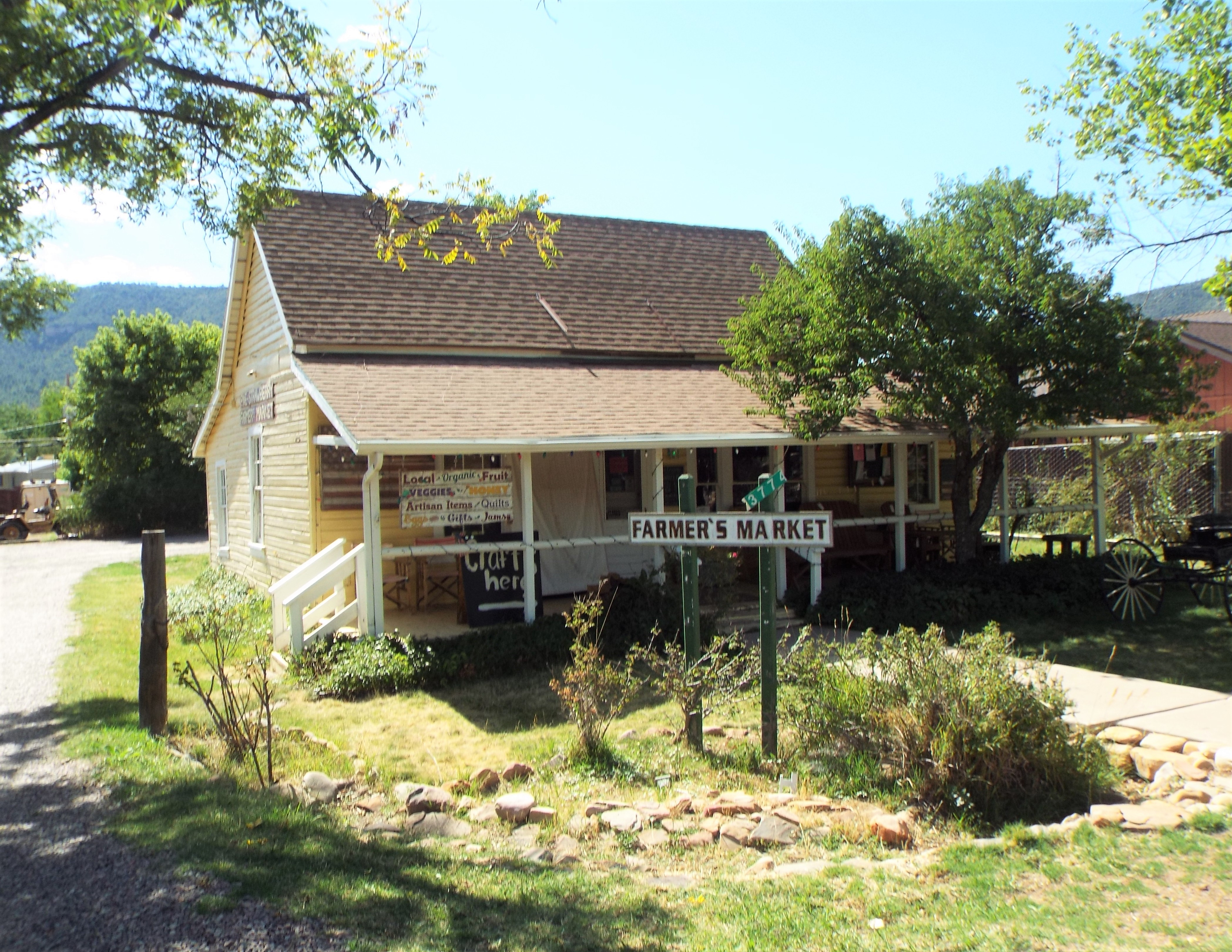
The Lyman Leavitt House

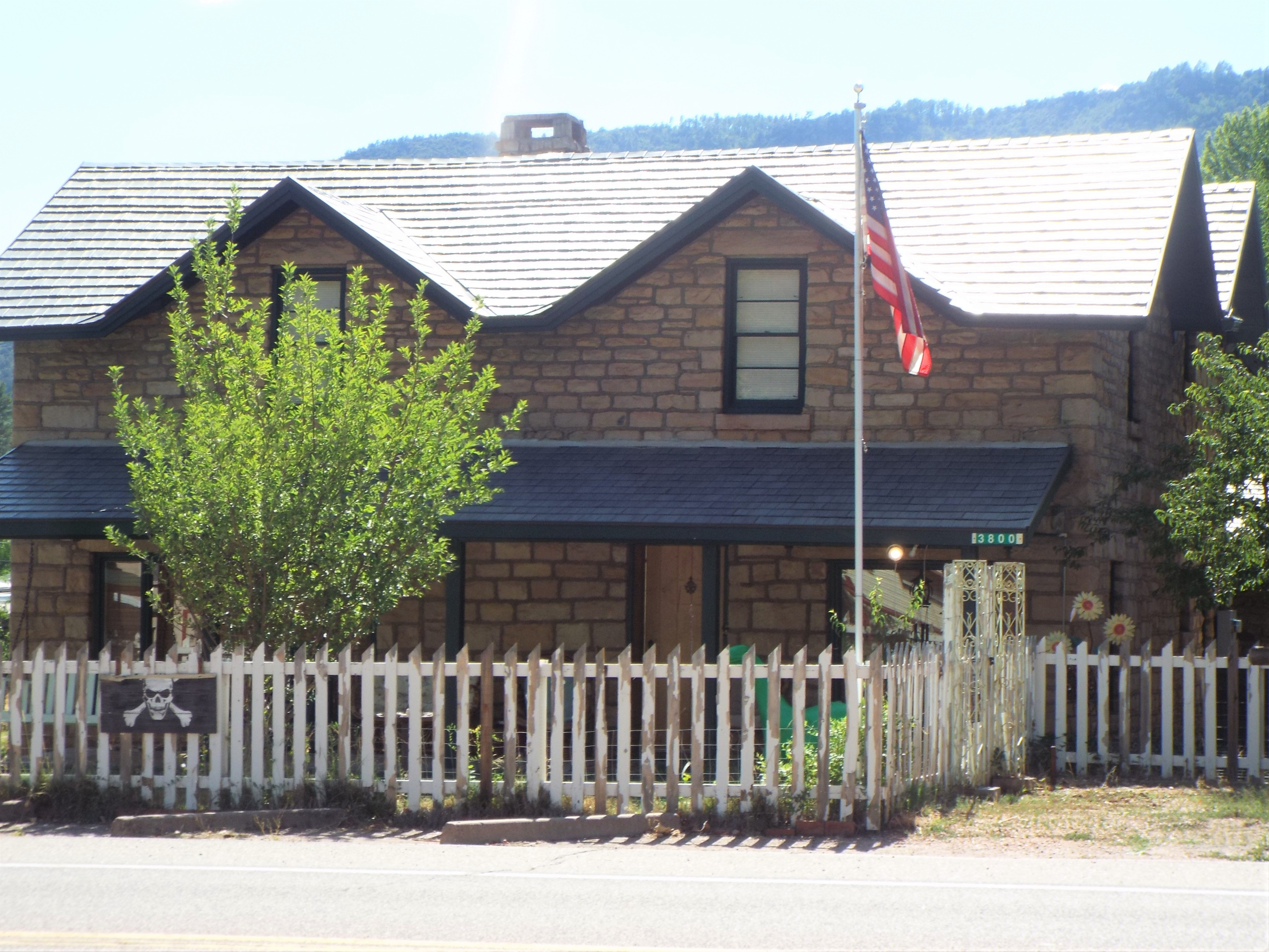
The Pryor Miller House

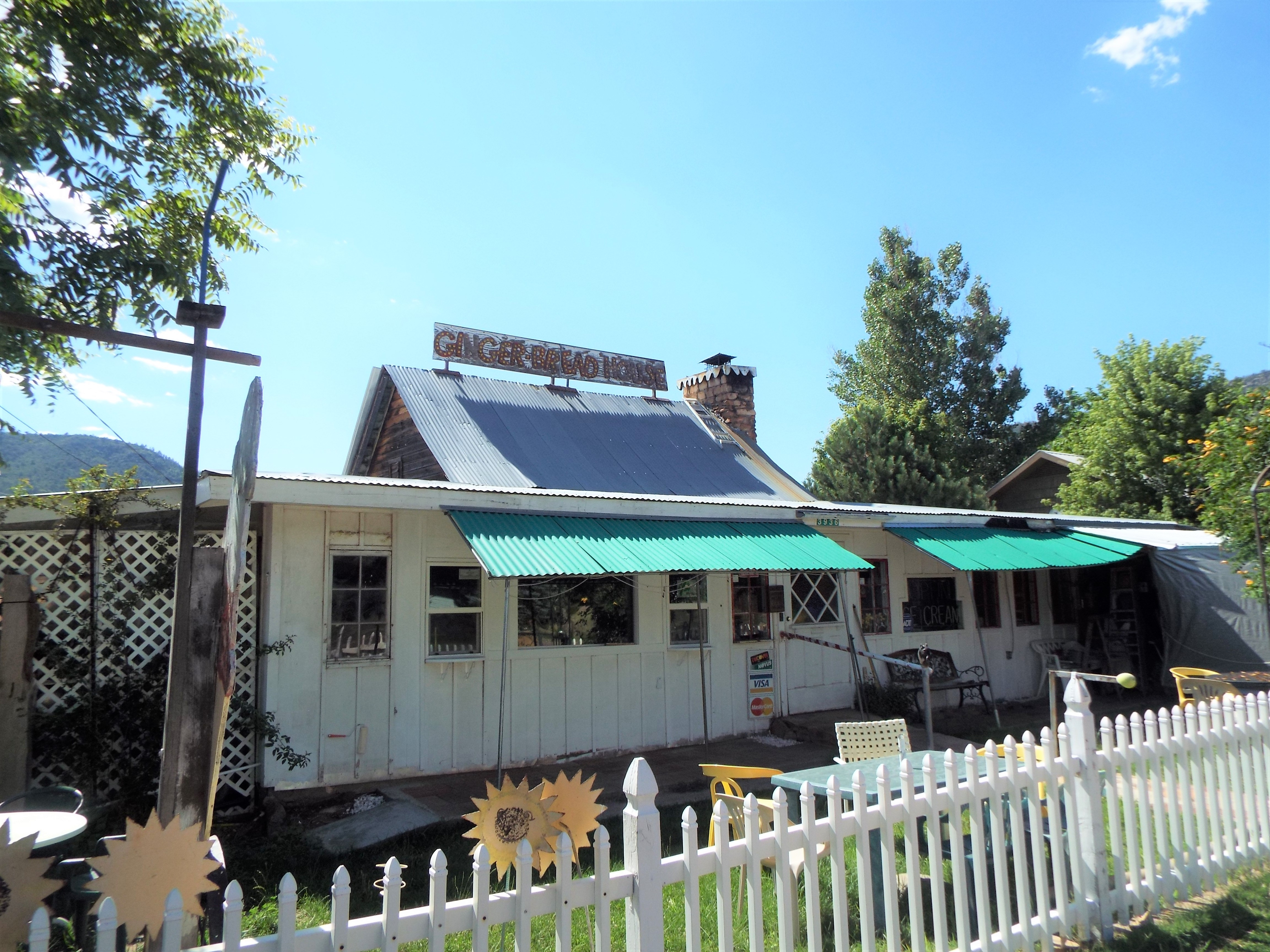
The John Lazear House

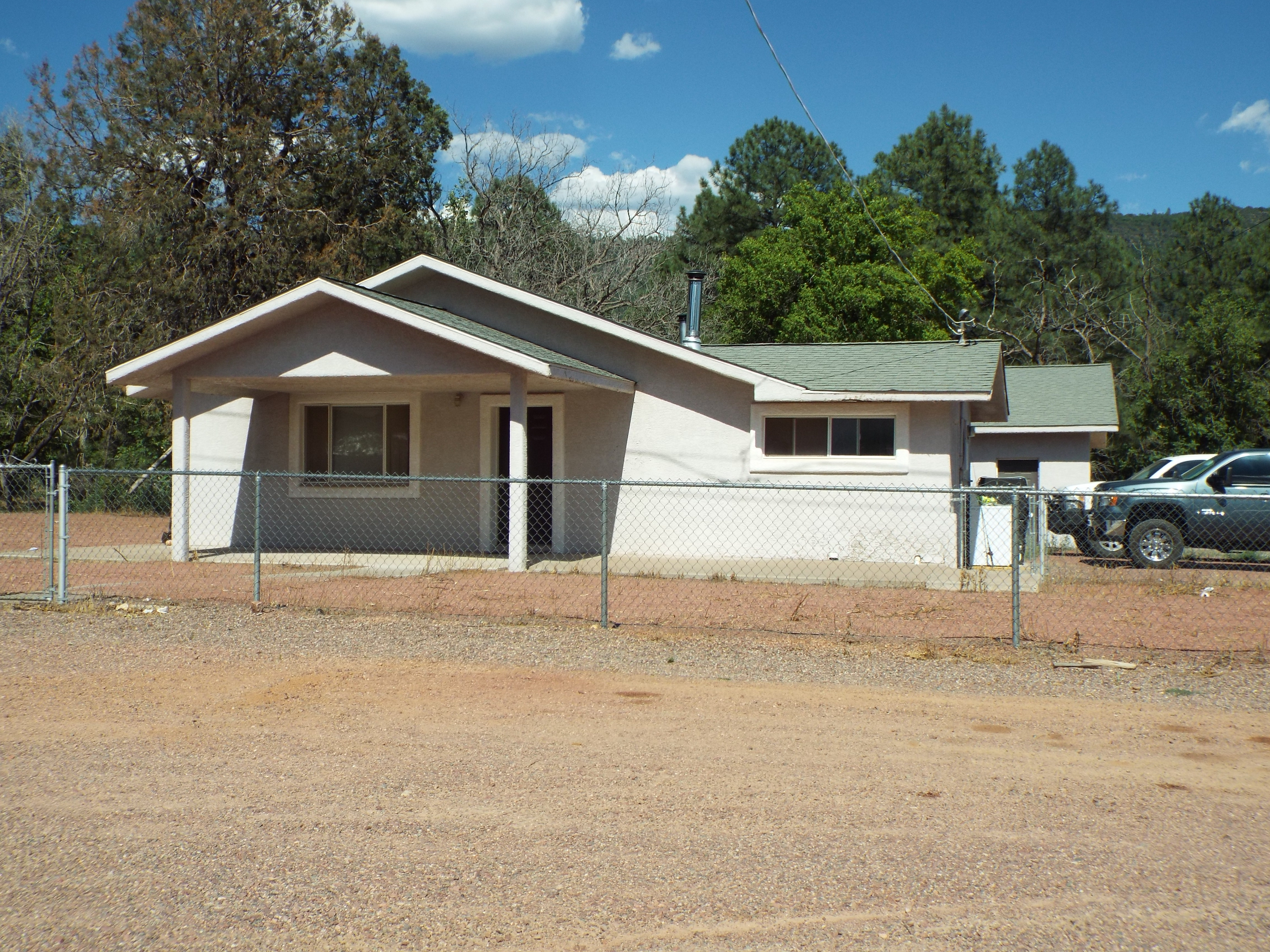
The once Pine Car Agency

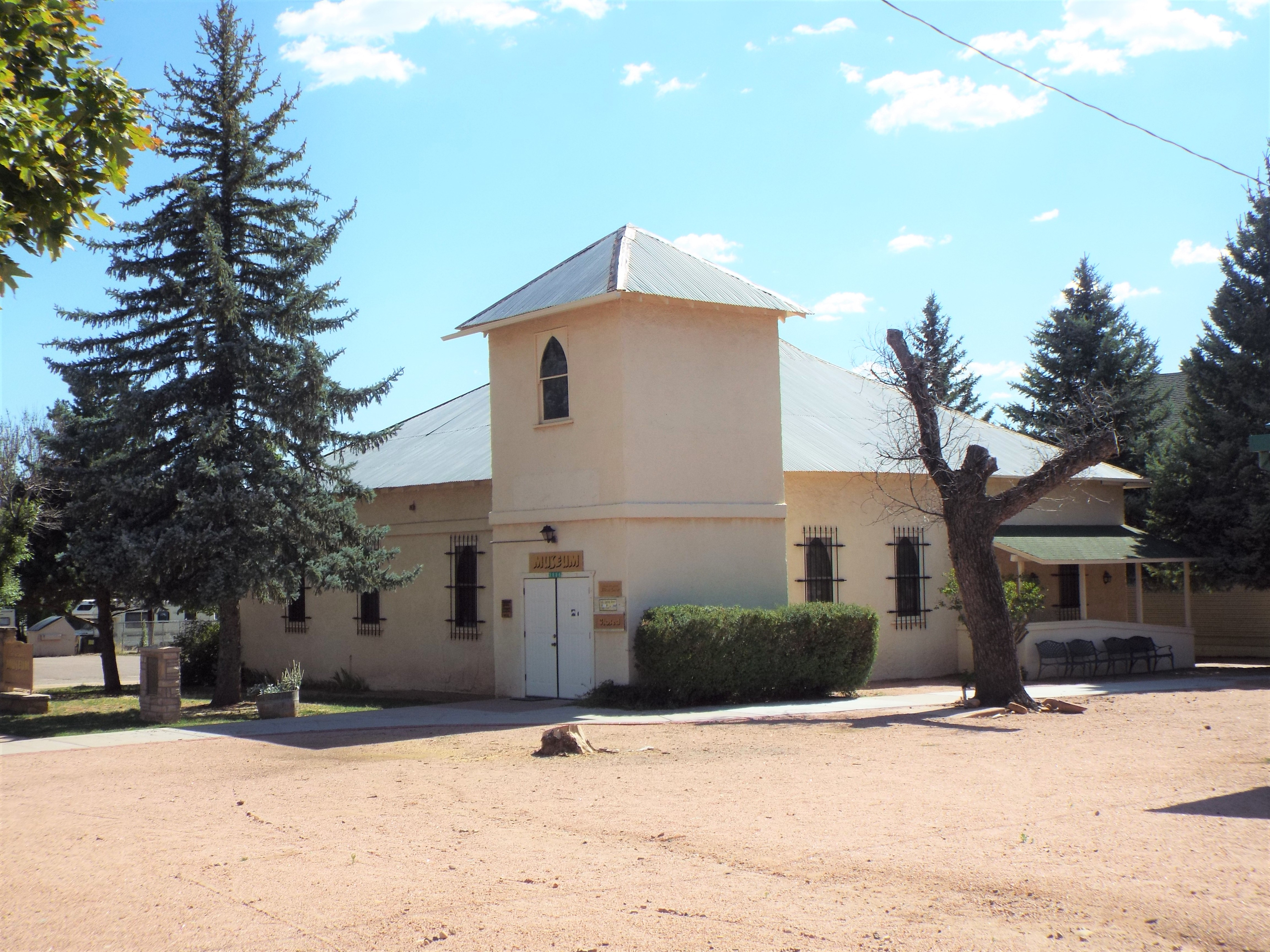
The Church of Jesus Christ of LDS Chapel

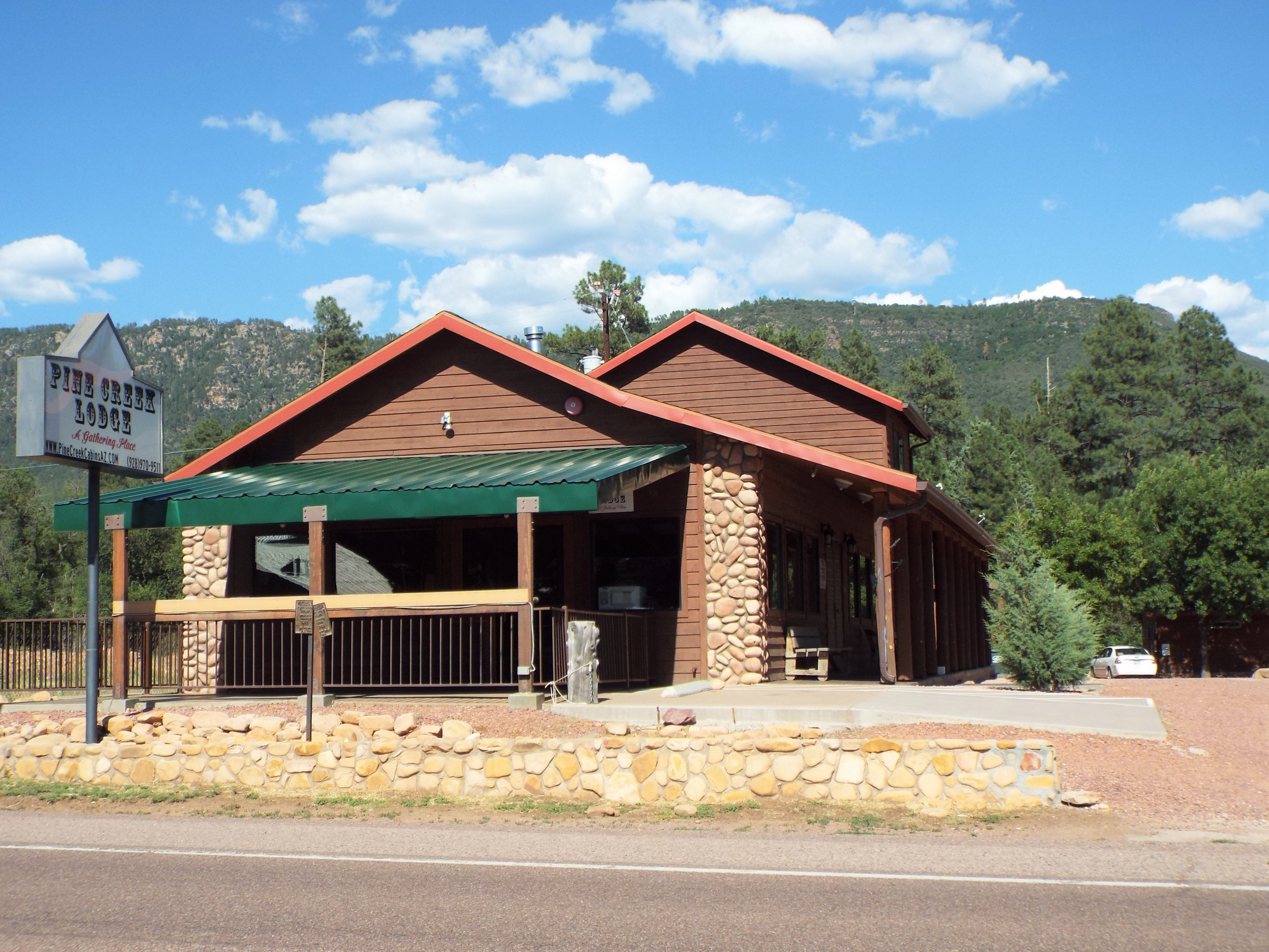
The LDS Meeting House

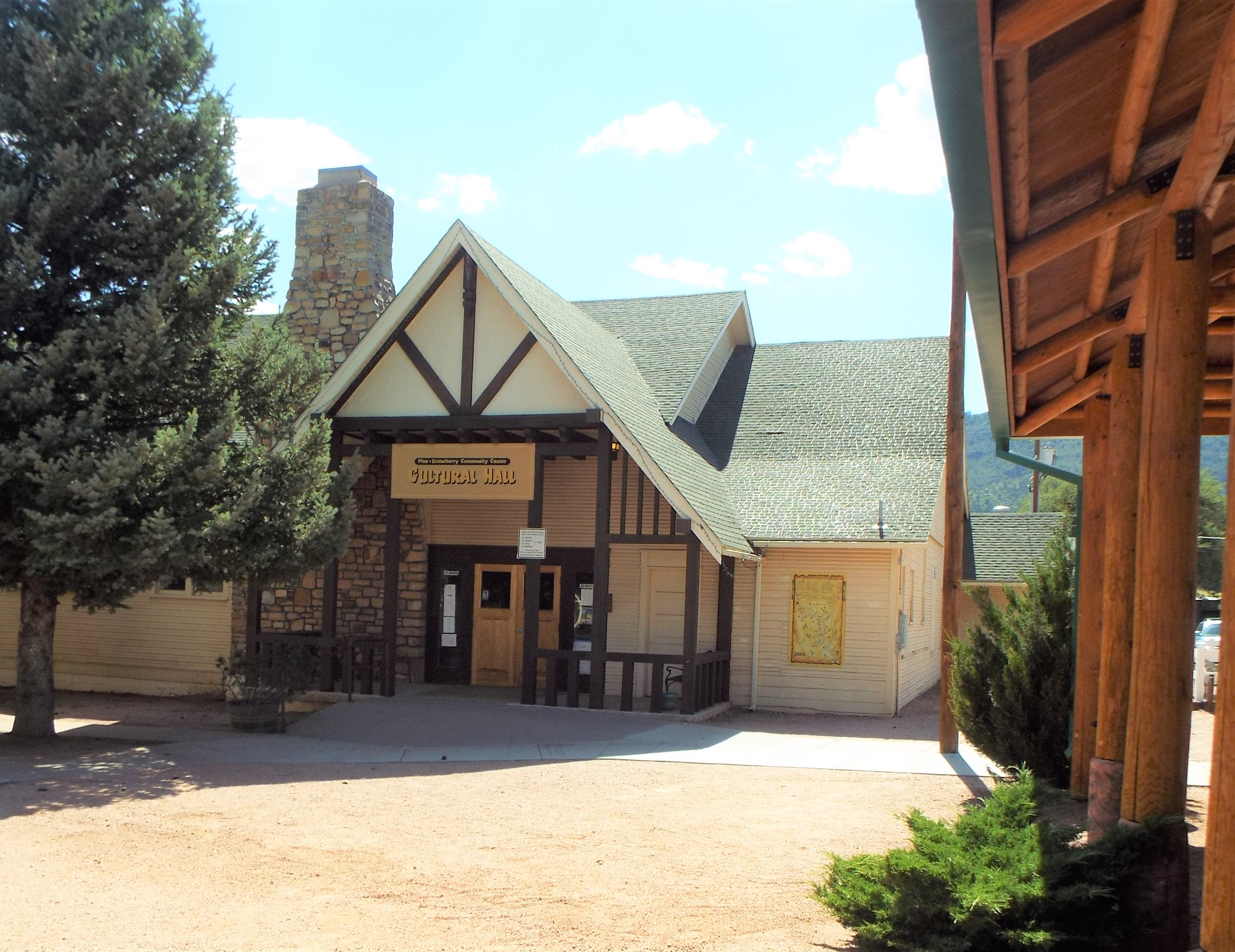
The Church of Jesus Christ of LDS Cultural Hall

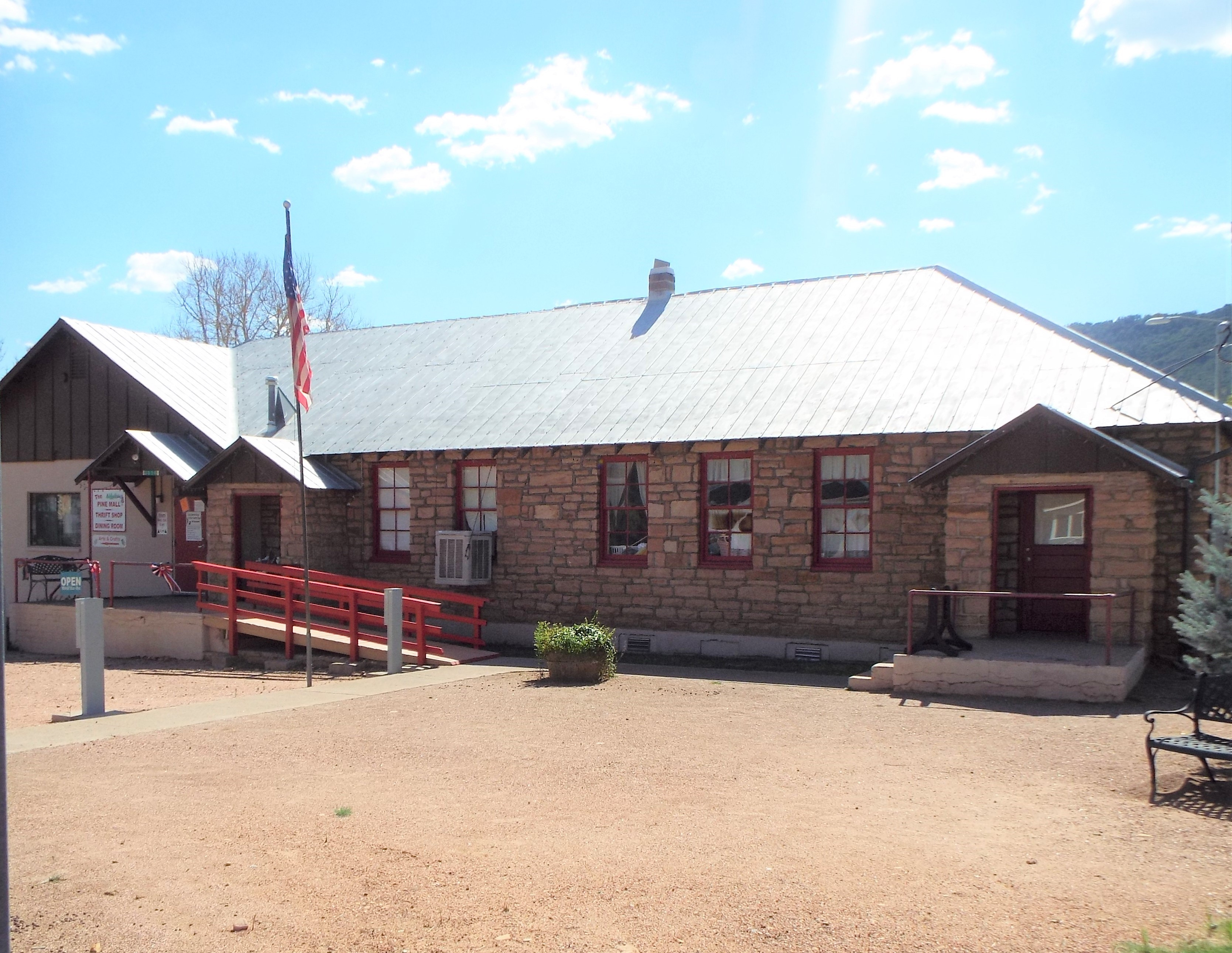
Pine High School

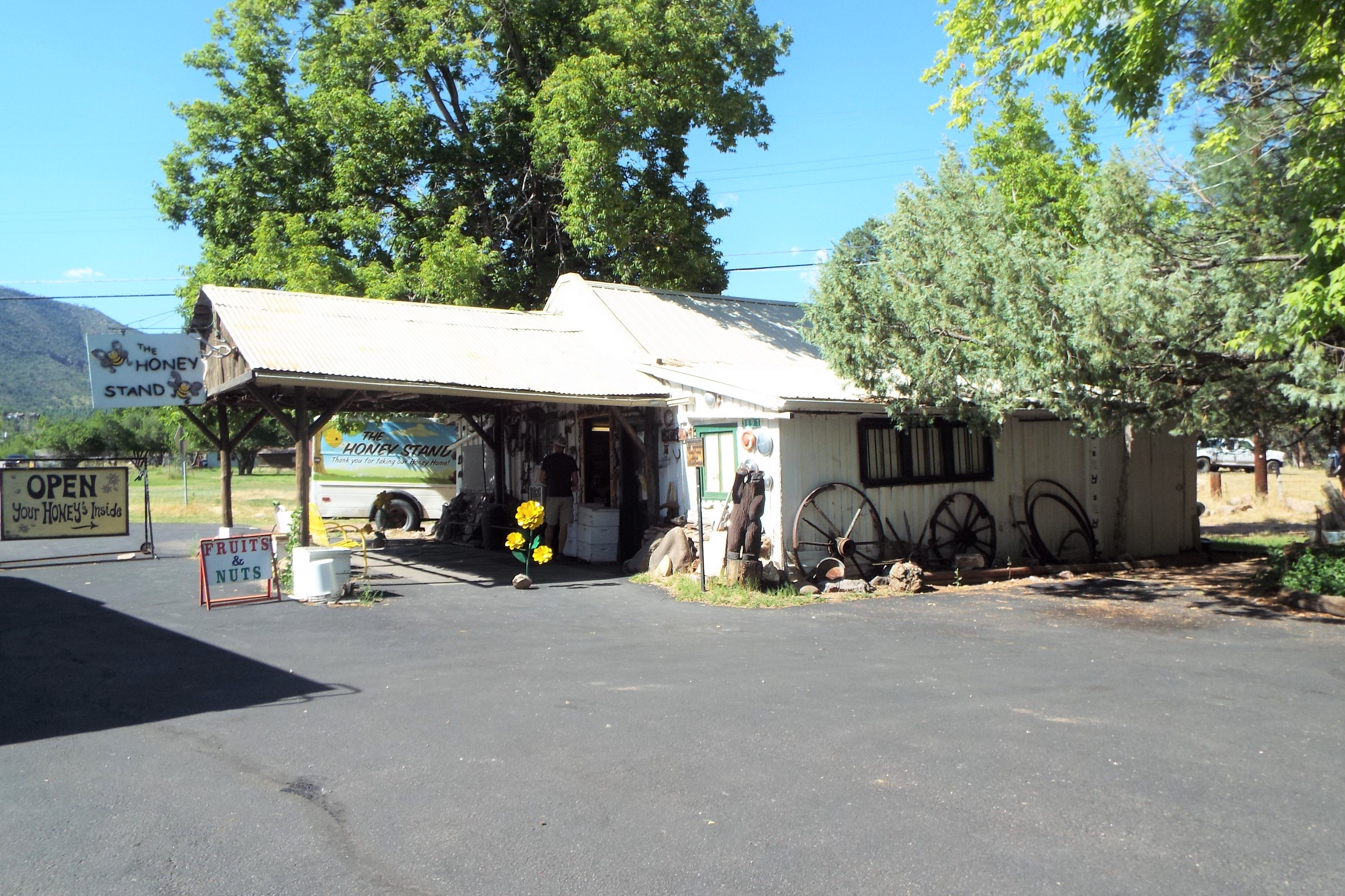
Pine Post Office

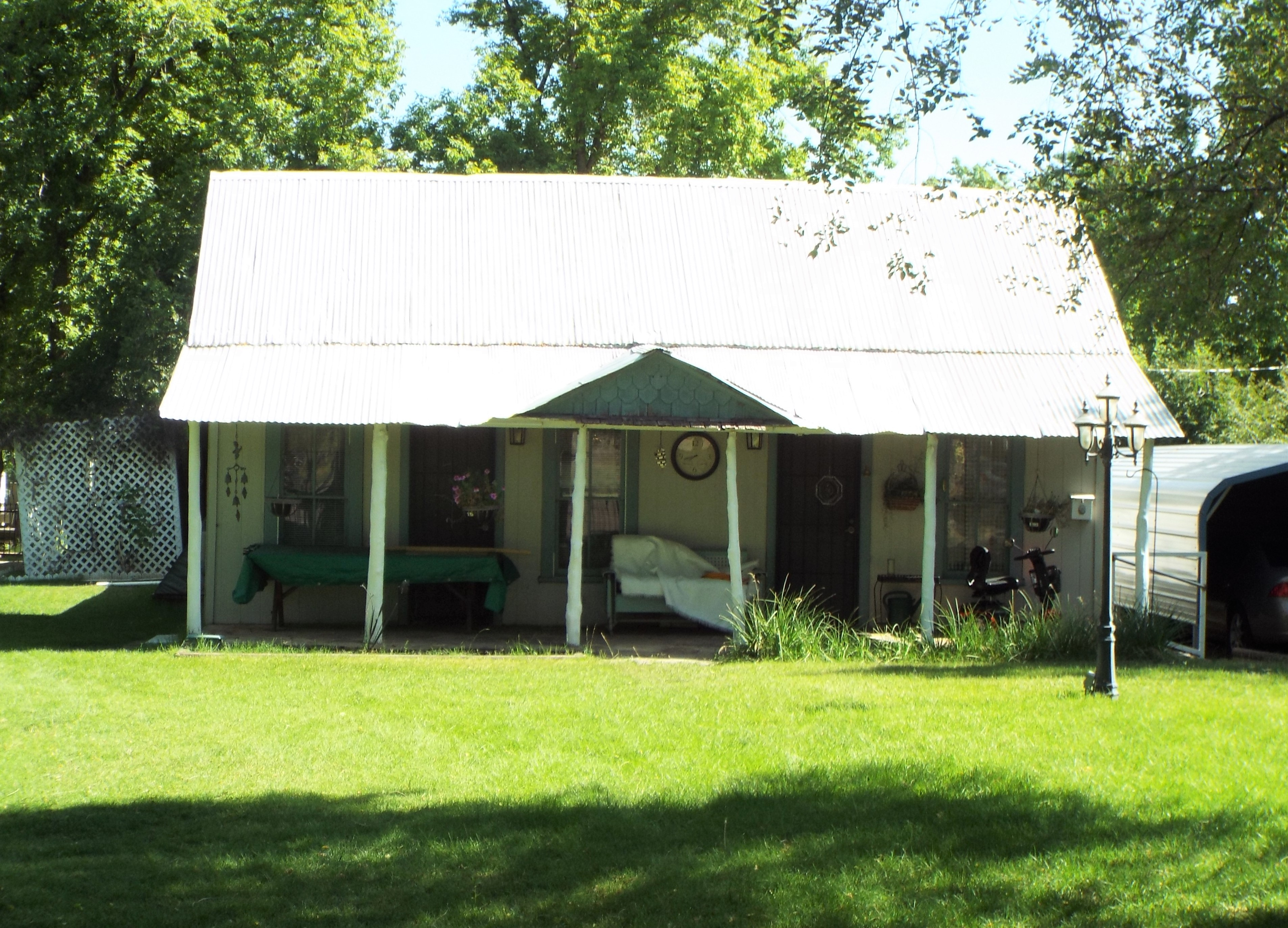
The Mulberry Inn

=== Historic Pine Cemetery ===
The land where the historic Pine Cemetery is located was donated in 1881 by Pryor and Katie C. Miller. The Pioneers' Cemetery Association (PCA) defines a "historic cemetery" as one which has been in existence for more than fifty years.

Historic Pine Cemetery

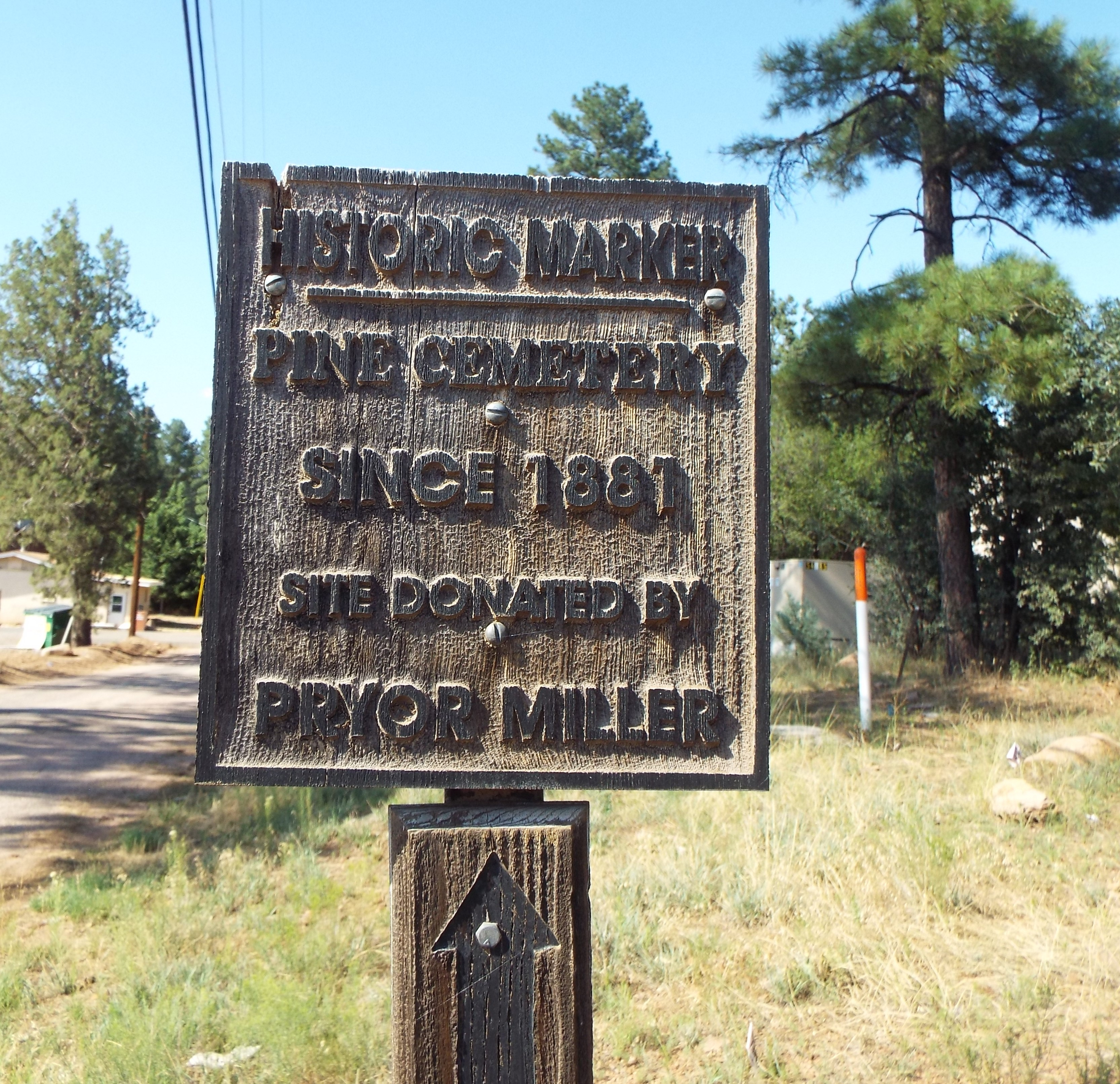
Pine Cemetery Marker

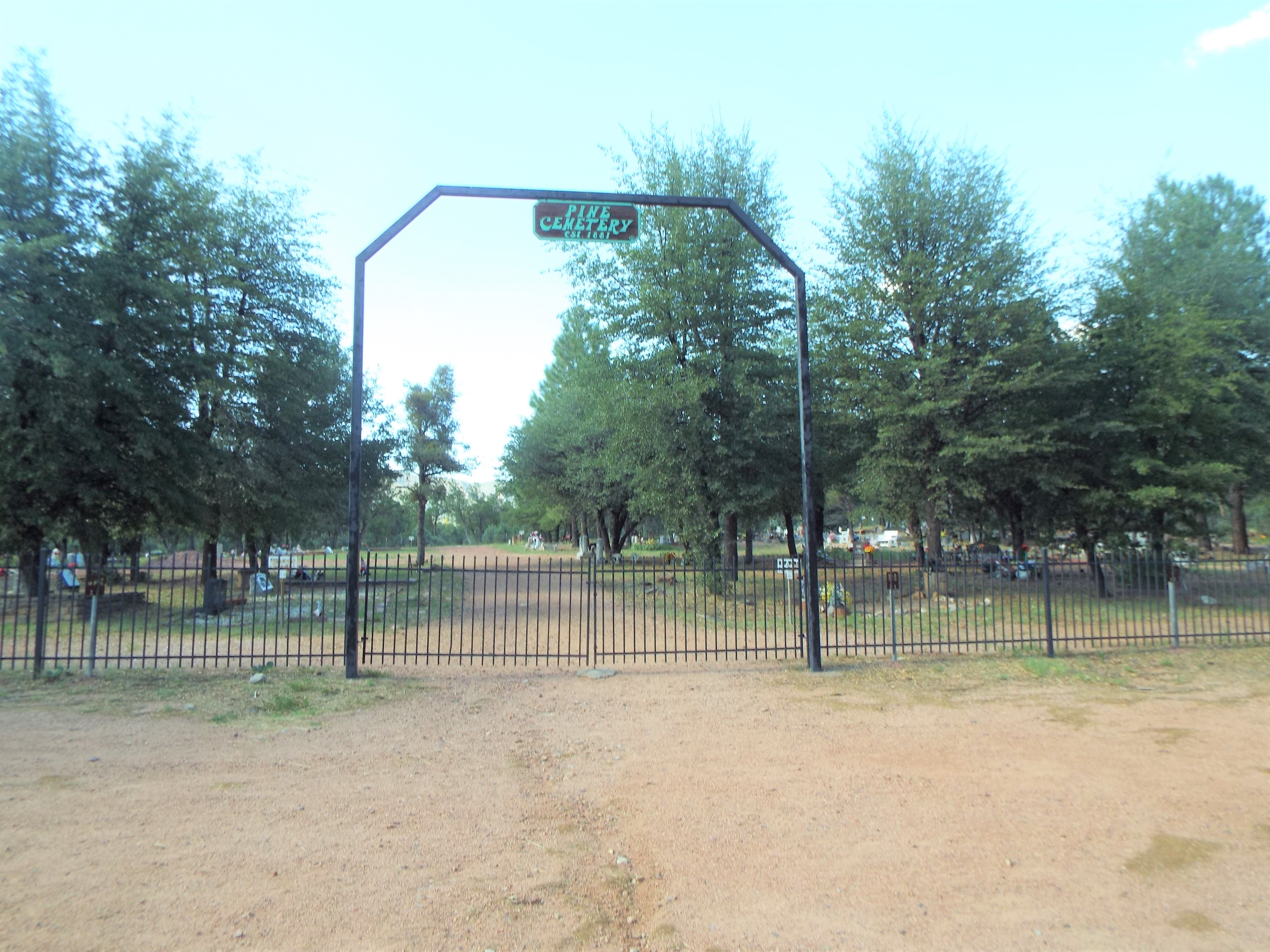
Pine Cemetery entrance

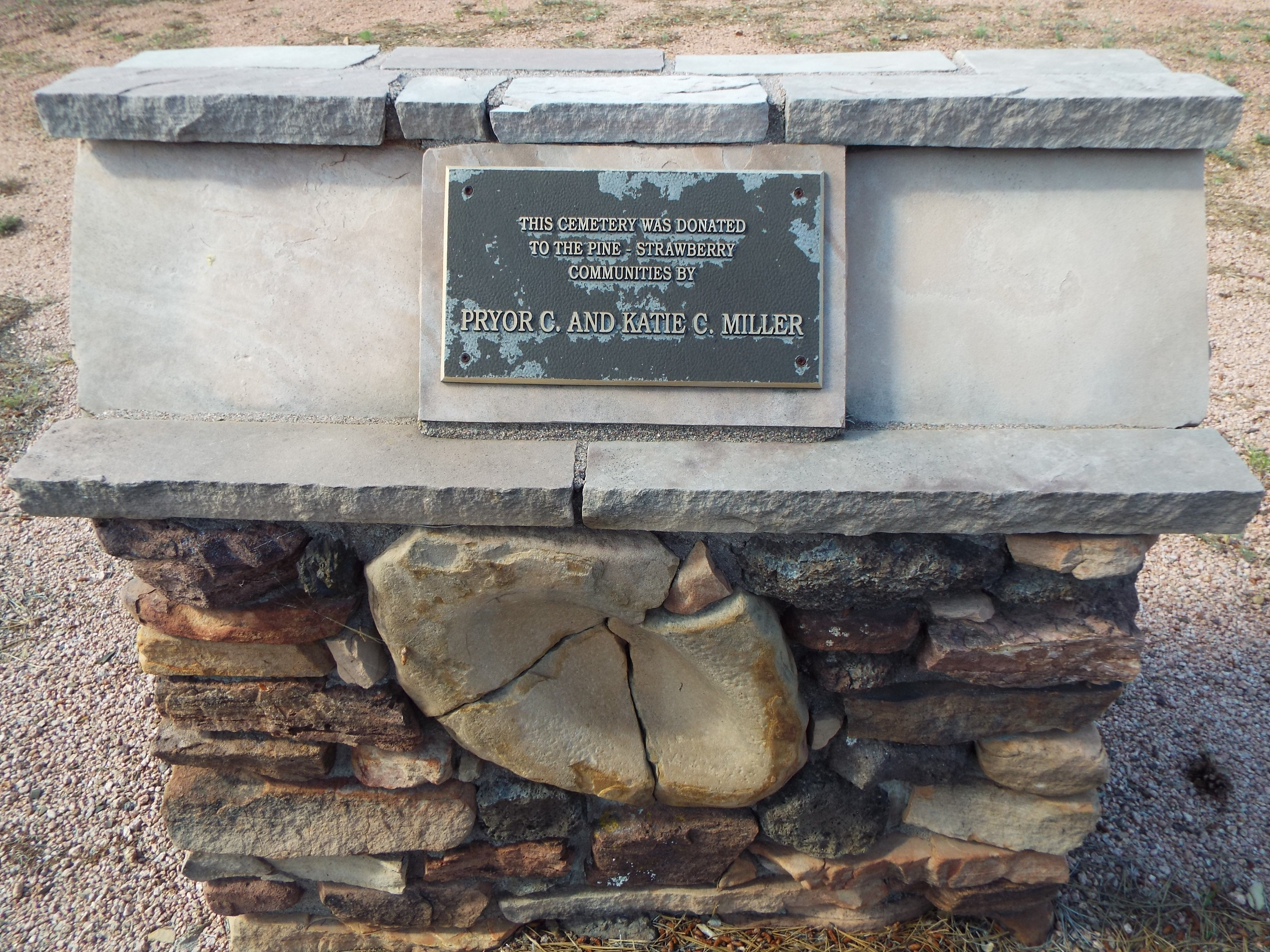
Dedication to Pryor and Katie C. Miller

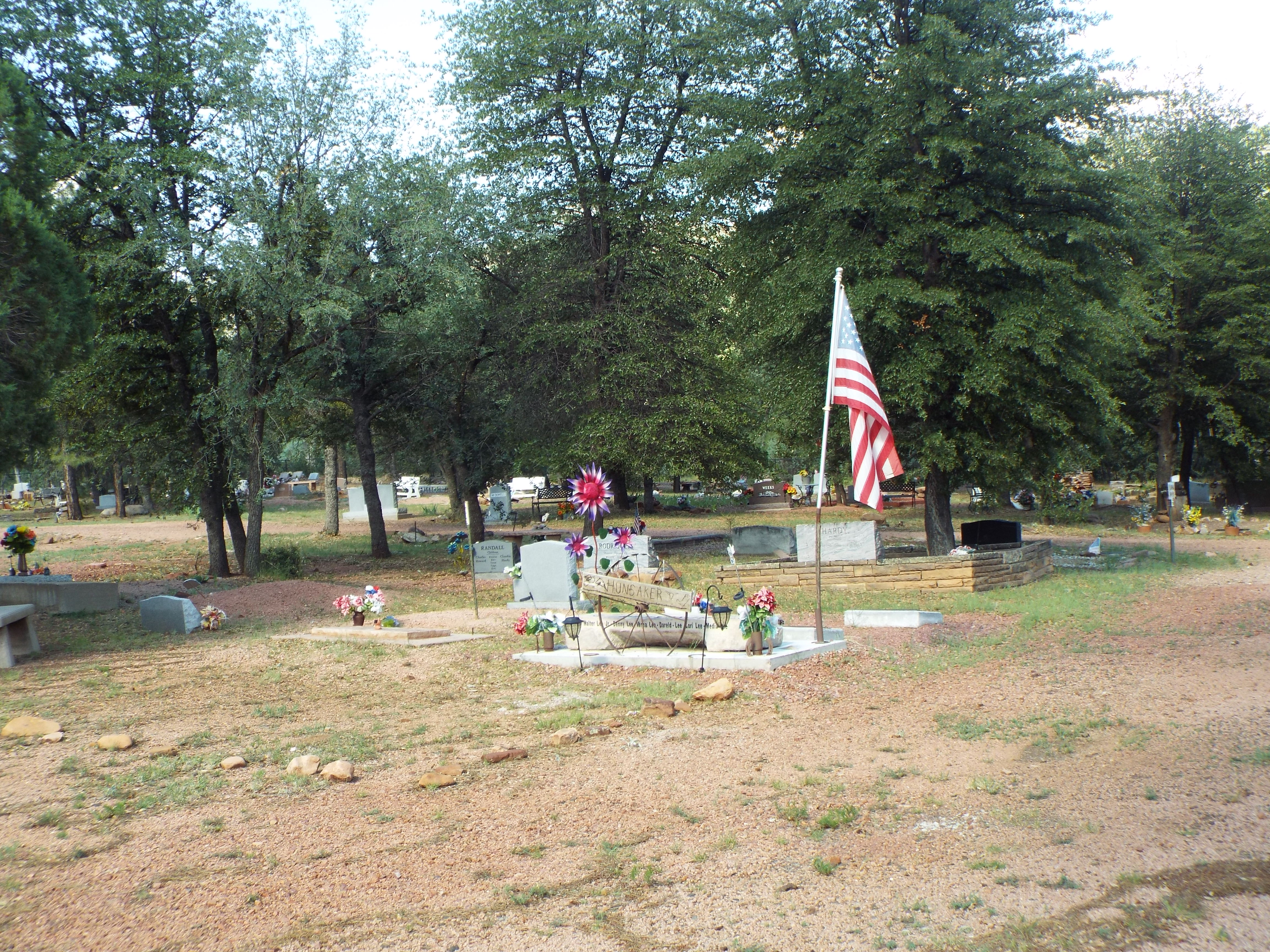
Pine Cemetery

== Tonto National Forest ==
One of the entrances to the Tonto National Forest is just off State Route 87, in the Pine Creek Canyon between Pine and Payson. The forest is home to the Tonto Natural Bridge and the historic Goodfellow Lodge.

The Goodfellow Lodge, built in 1925, is located to the left of the entrance gate. The lodge was listed in the National Register of Historic Places on August 21, 1986, reference: #86001558. Trails from the lodge lead to the location of the Tonto Natural Bridge. The Tonto Natural Bridge is the largest natural travertine bridge in the world. The bridge is what is known as a natural arch bridge. In 1877, David Gowan, a Scotsman, was the first known person to document the natural bridge. The bridge's tunnel is 400-foot-long (120 m) and measures 150 feet (46 m) at its widest point and reaches a height of 183 feet (56 m).

Historic Goodfellow Lodge and Tonto Natural Bridge

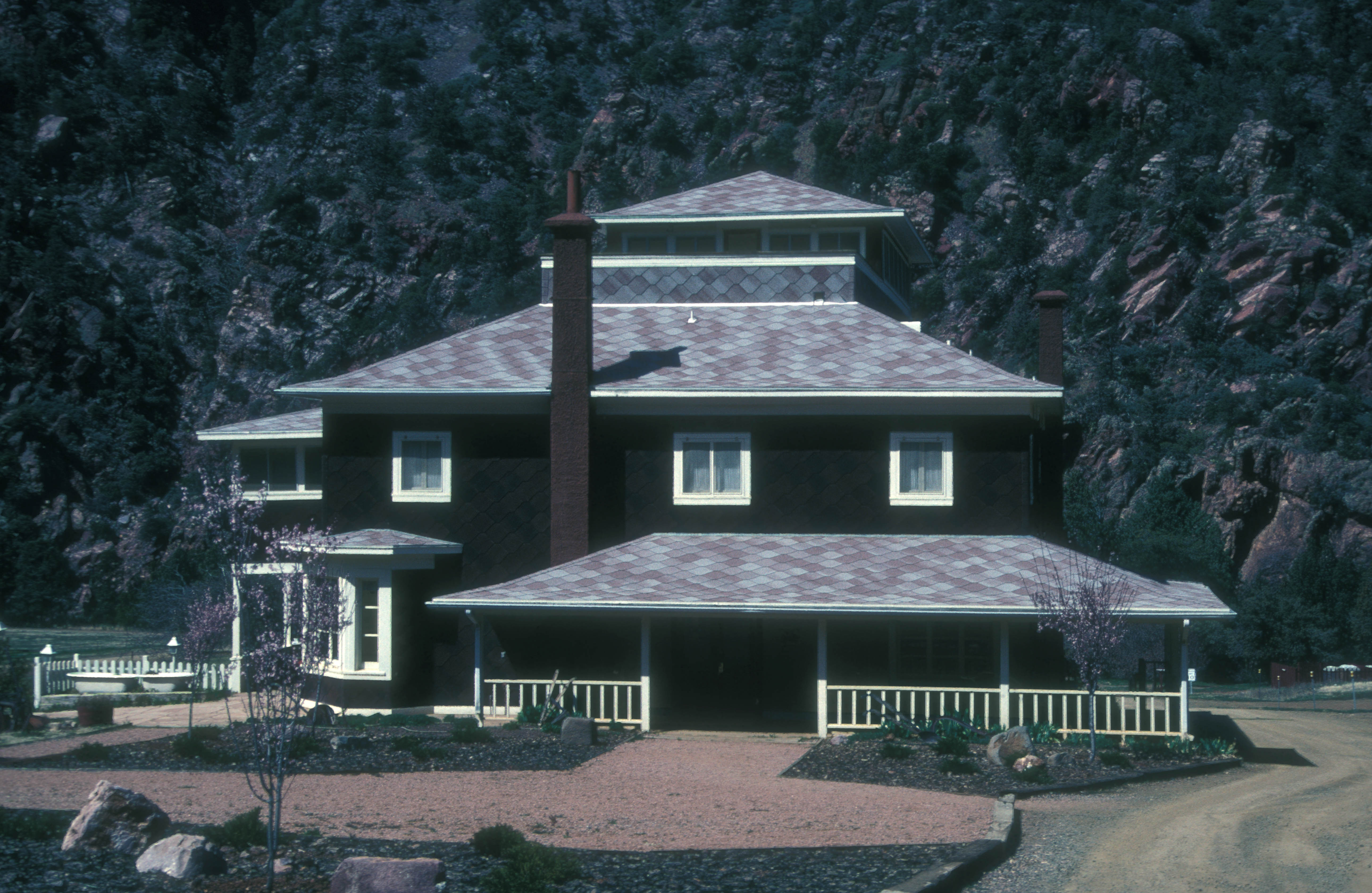
Goodfellow Lodge

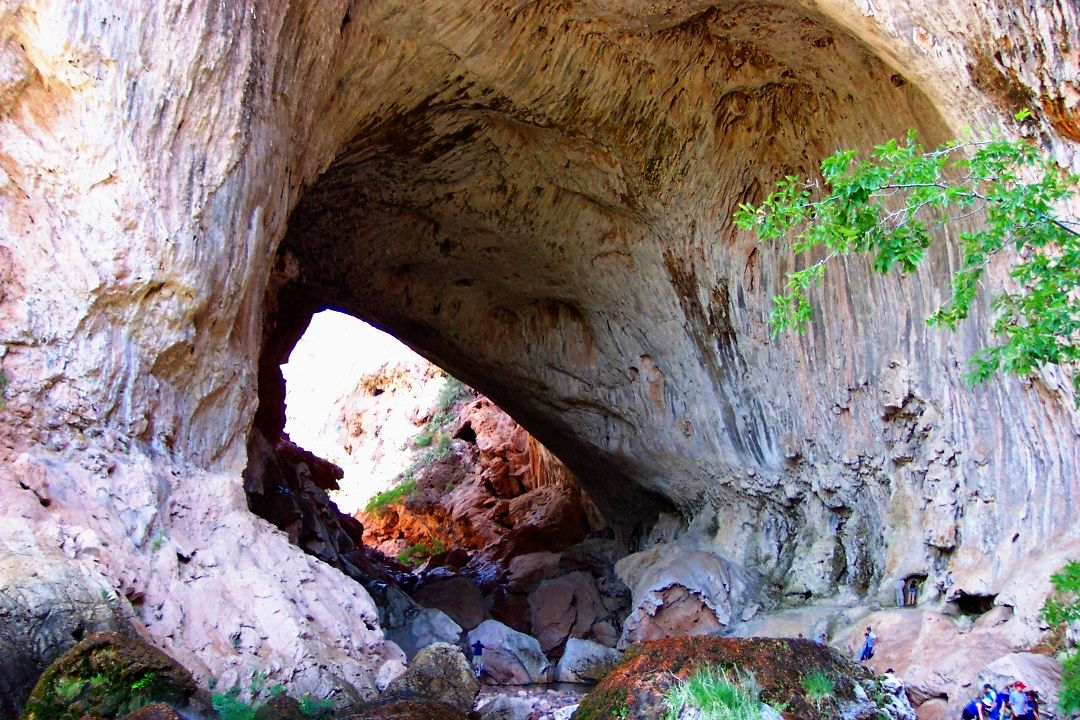
Tonto Natural Bridge

== Historic structures in Strawberry which are pictured ==
Pictured are the following historic structures and cemetery which are located on or near Fossil Creek Road in Strawberry:

- The Charles Parkinson House – built in 1888, Charles Parkinson worked in the valley, bought cattle and helped build the Old Strawberry School.
- The Issac and John Lowthian Barn – built in 1877. The Lowthian's raised corn to feed their hogs in the Strawberry Valley in 1877. In the barn they butchered the hogs, cured the meat and packed it by mule to deliver the meat to the army post in the Verde Valley.
- The Hunt Ranch – established by Albert and Mary Hunt in 1880.
- A 1880 Silo and Shack.
- "General Hunt" – One of the oldest trees in Strawberry.

Two of the historic properties, which may have been demolished, and which are not pictured are:

- The Huffer Family House
- The Wingfield Family House

=== Images ===
Historic Strawberry

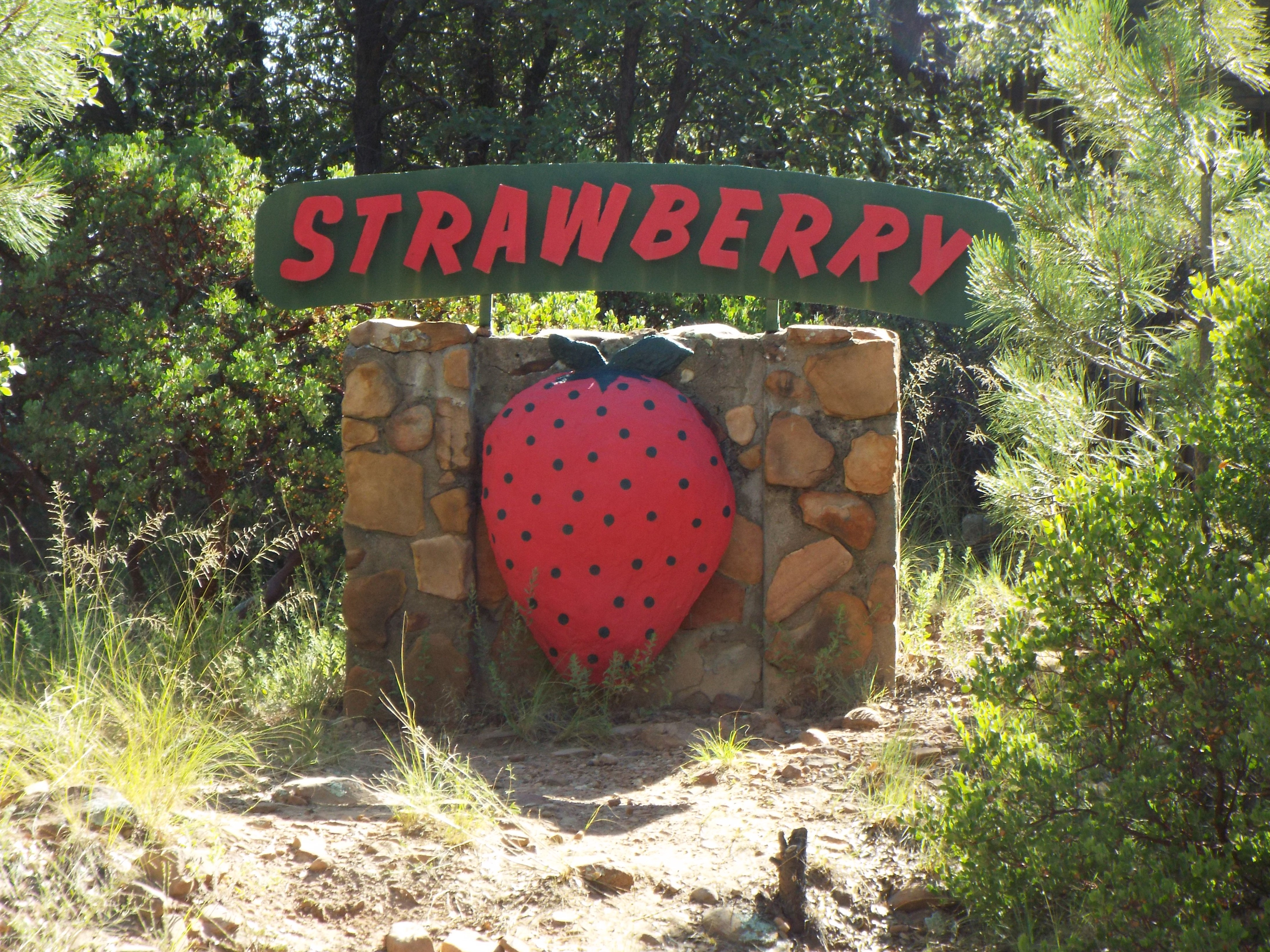
Welcome to Strawberry

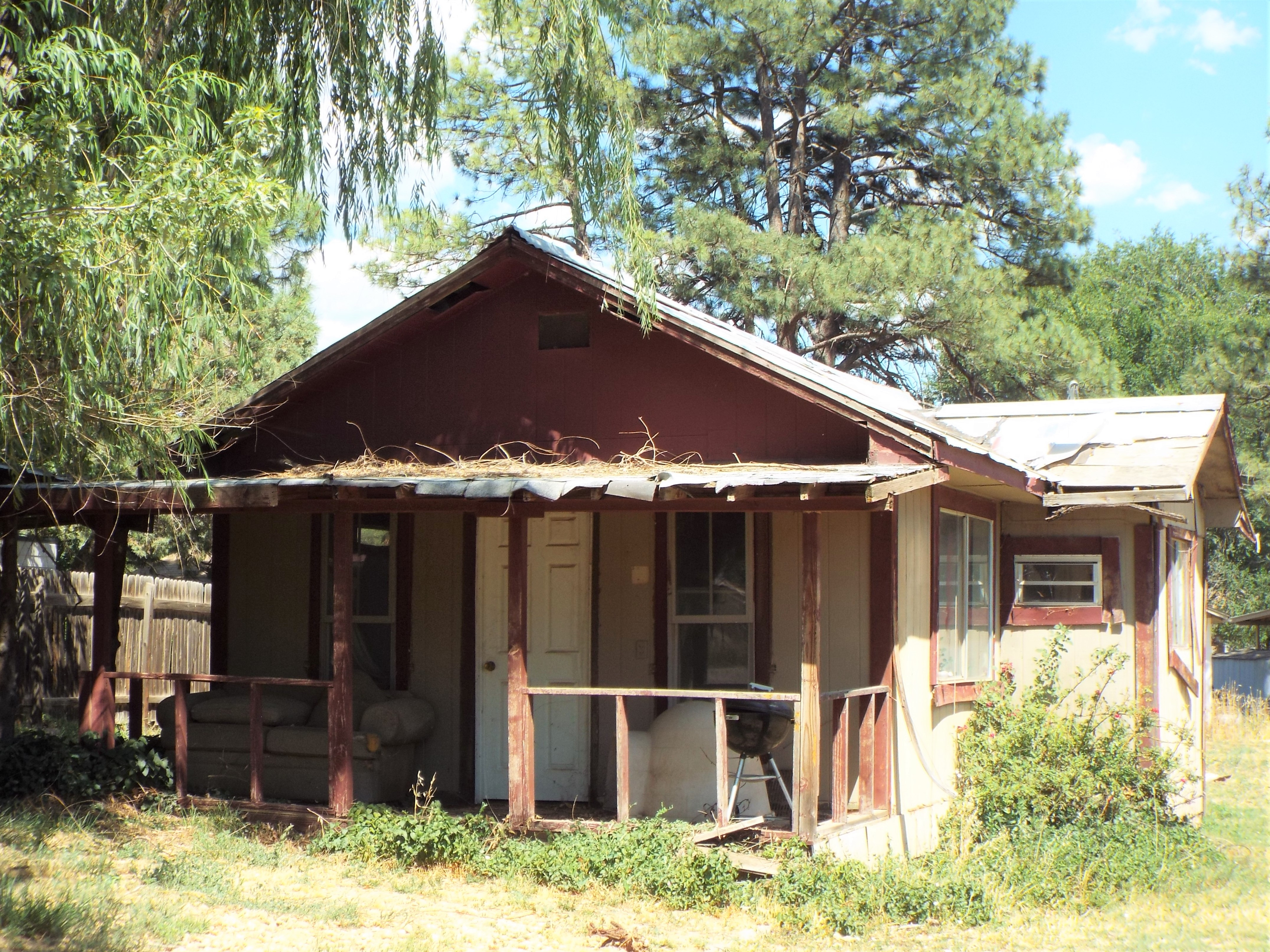
The Charles Parkinson House

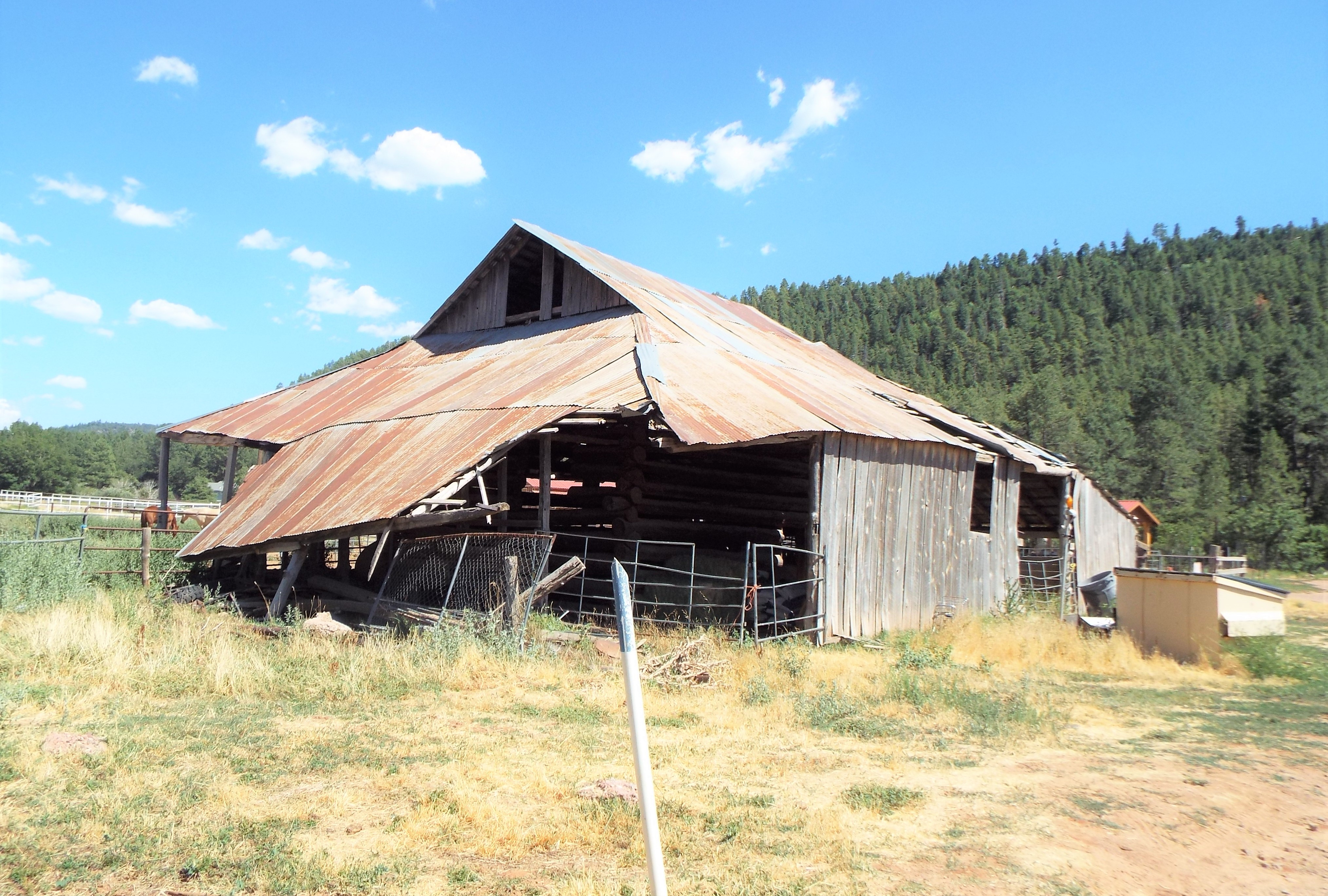
Issac and John Lowthian Barn

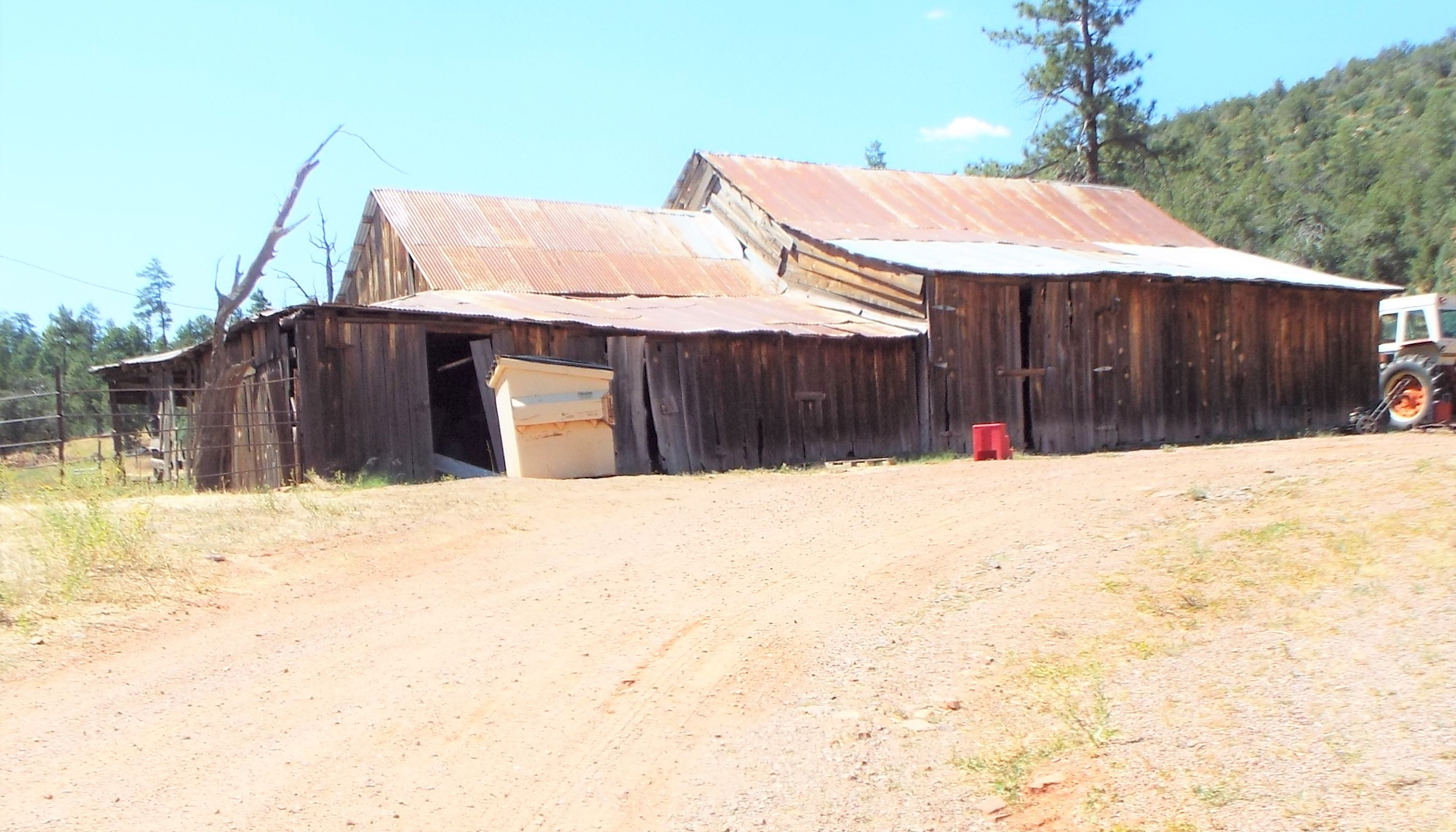
The Hunt Ranch

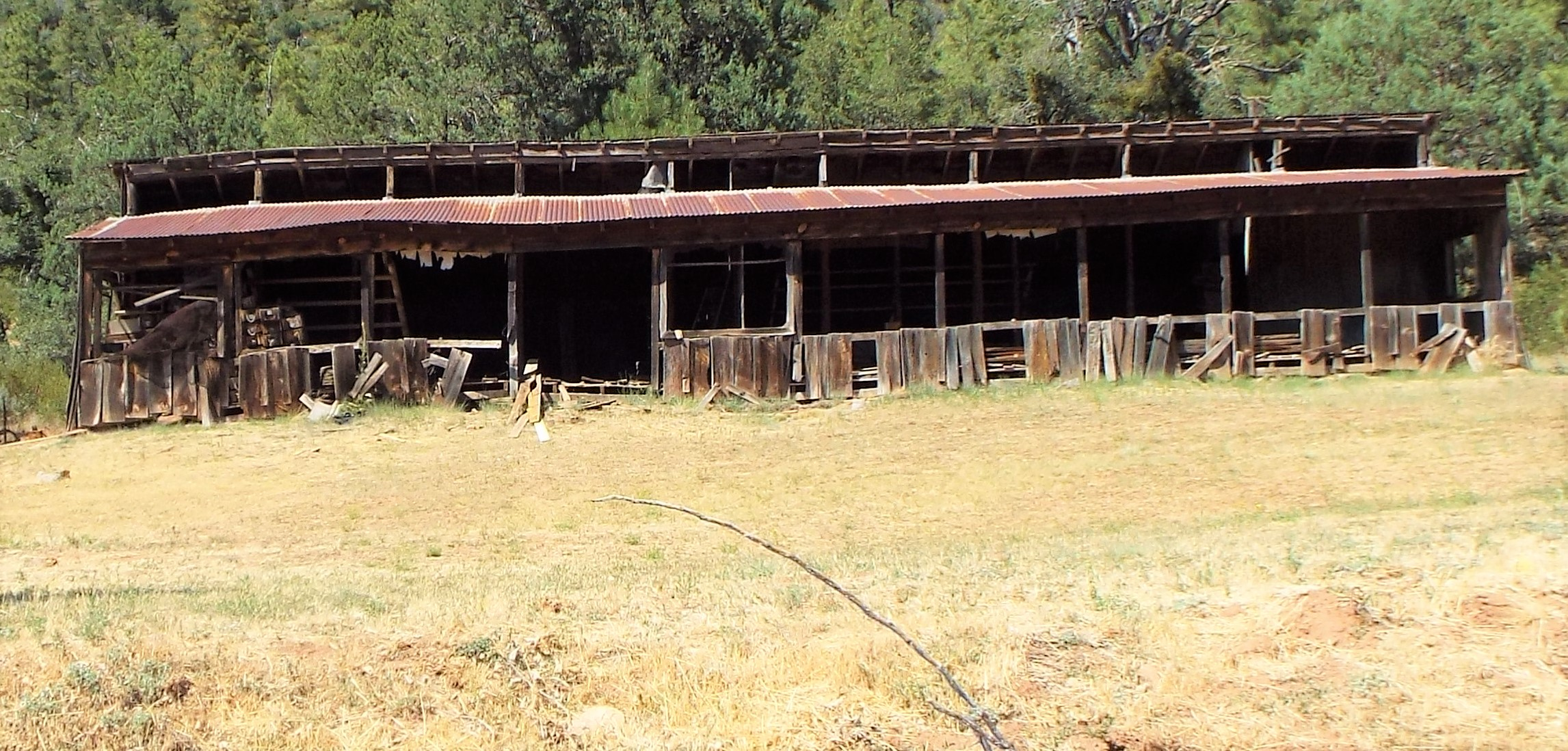
The Hunt Ranch

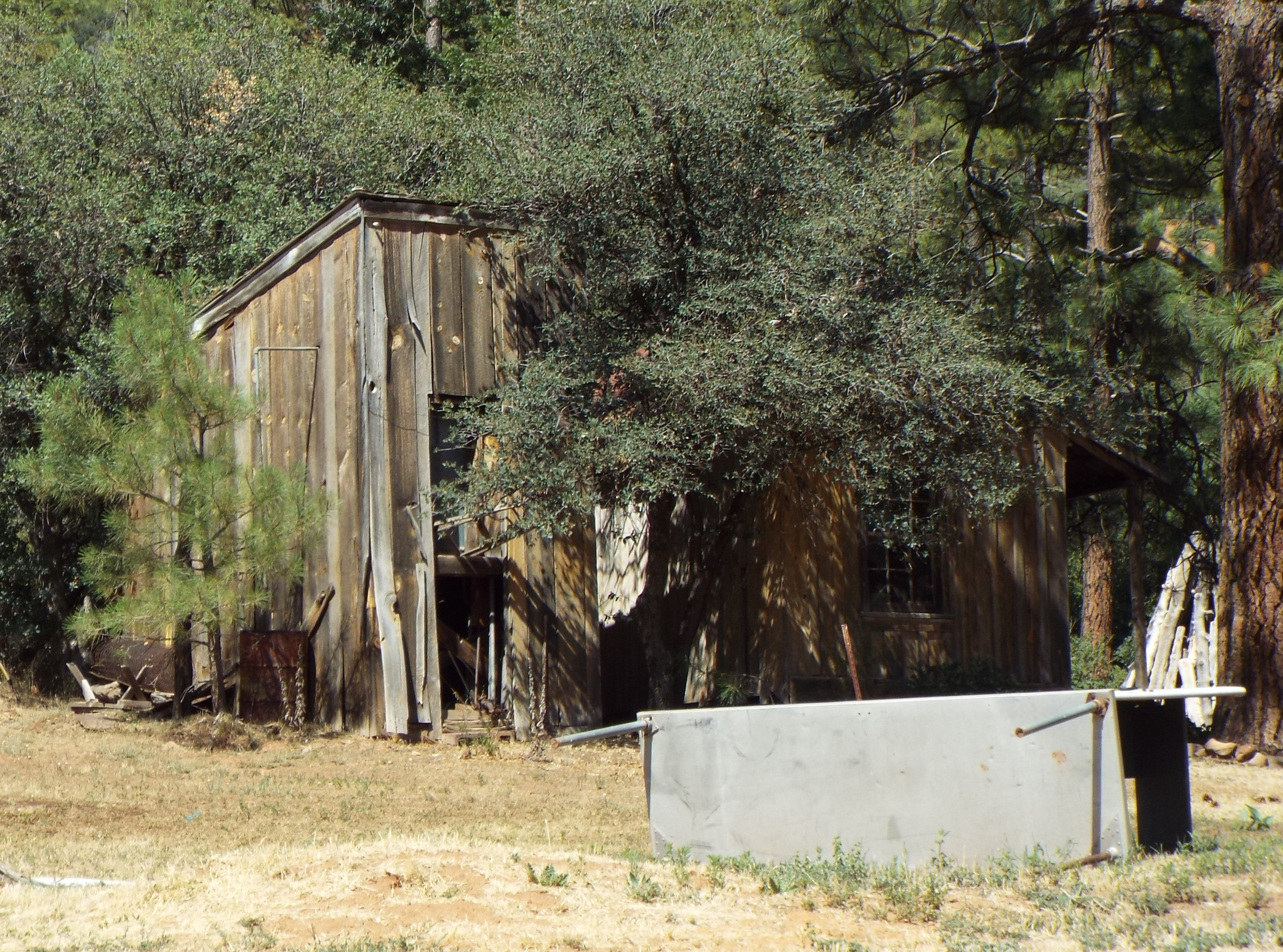
The Hunt Ranch

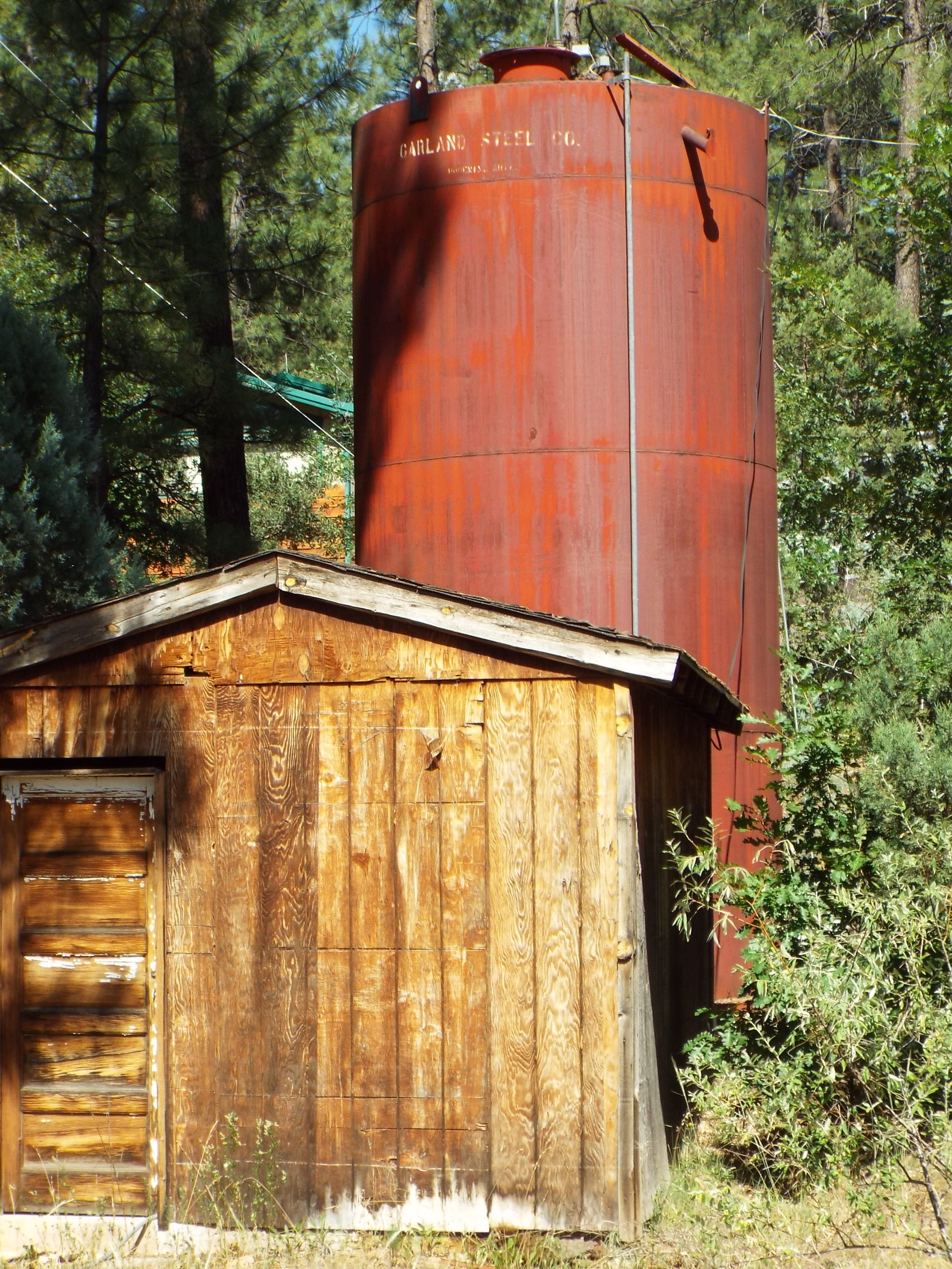
1880 Silo and Shack

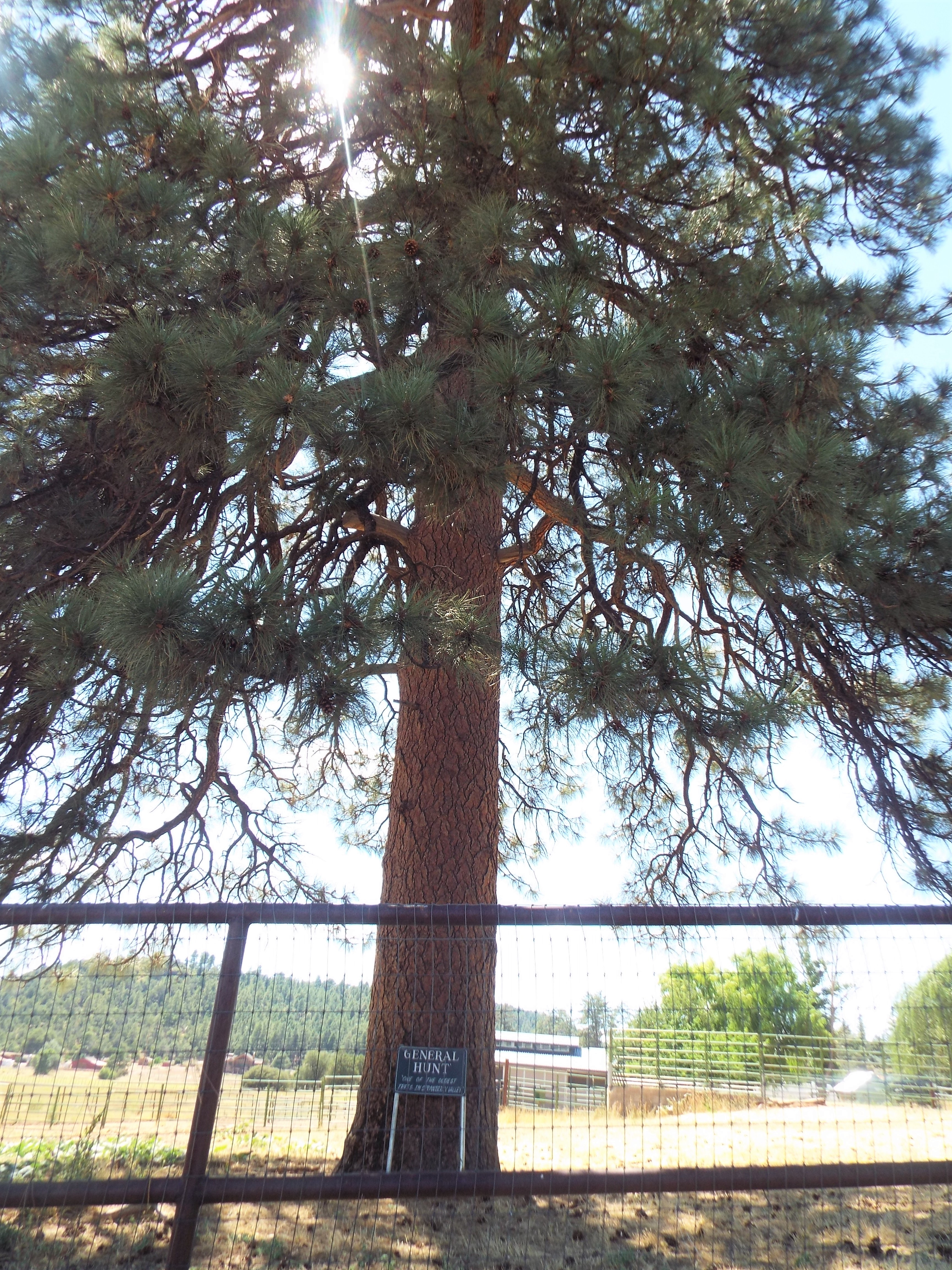
"General Hunt" tree

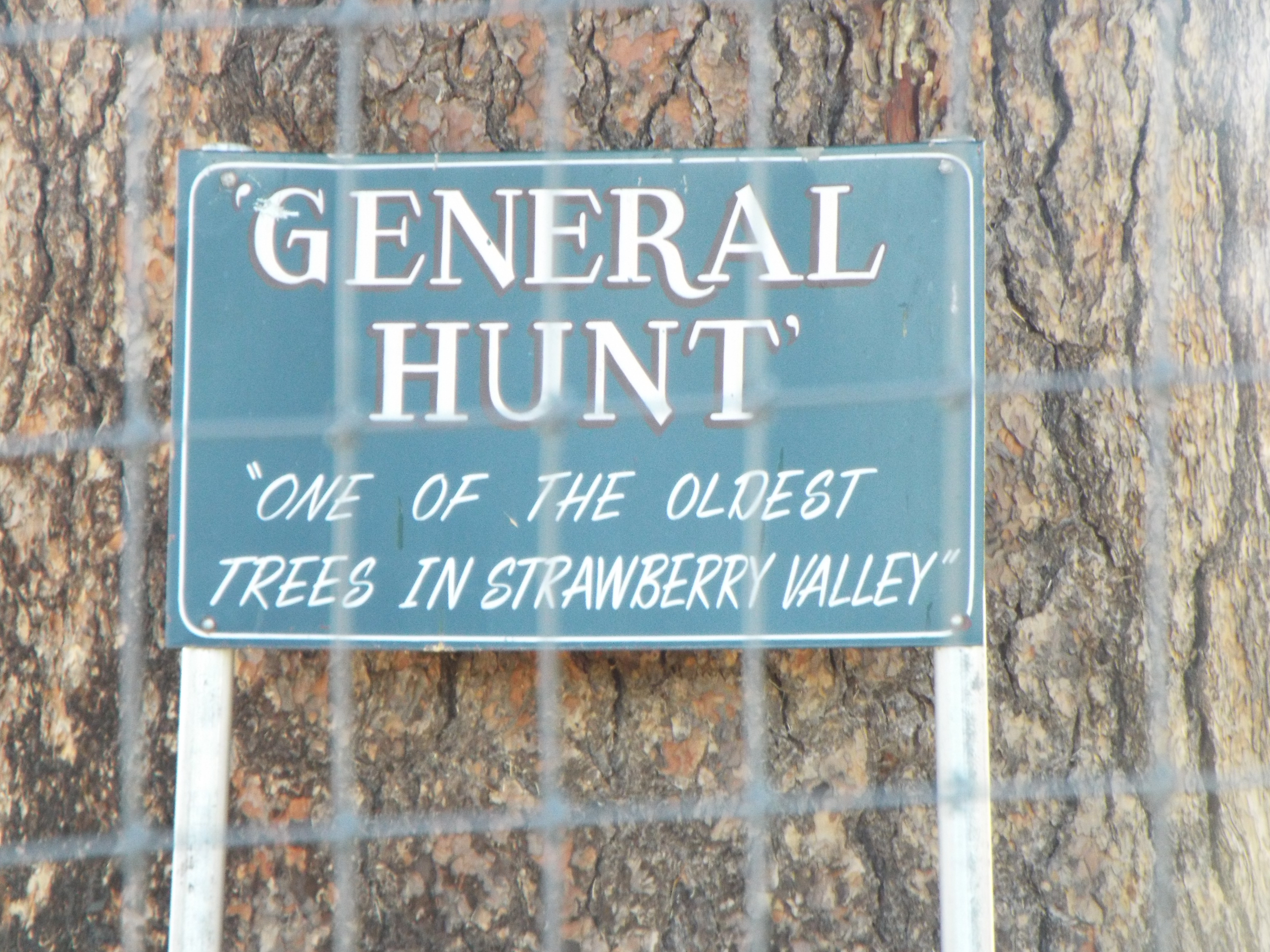
"General Hunt" marker

=== Historic Strawberry Schoolhouse ===
The Strawberry Schoolhouse was a one-room structure built in 1882 using the wood from the Pine trees in the area. The school is located on 9318 Fossil Creek Road and was listed in the National Register of Historic Places on May 10, 2005, reference: #05000422. The structure was later used as a meeting place, social center and church. The schoolhouse is believed to be the "Oldest Standing School in Arizona".

Historic Strawberry Schoolhouse

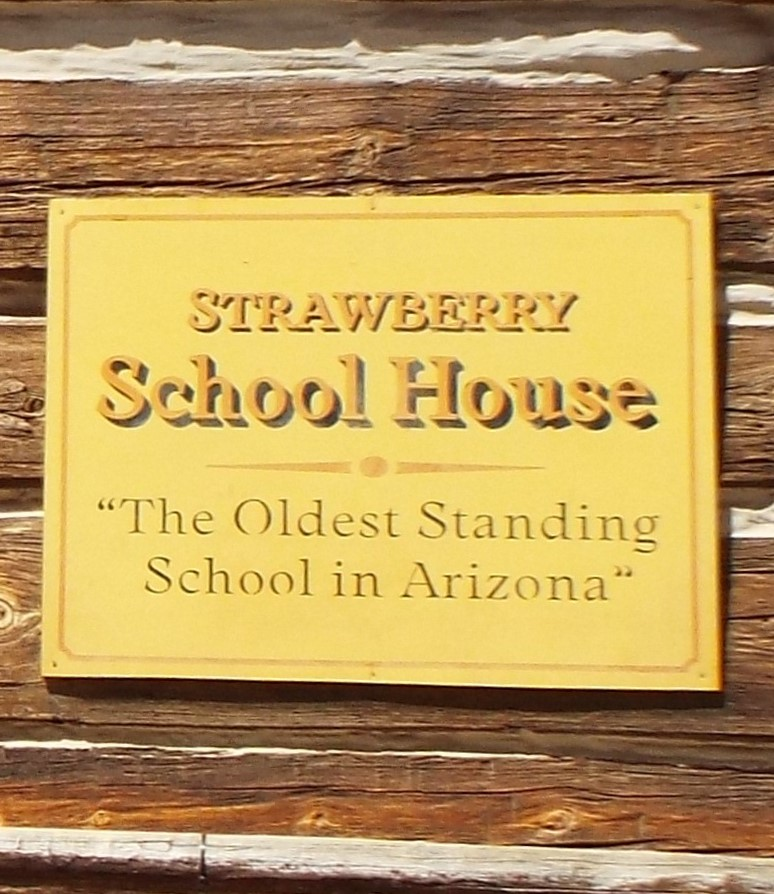
Strawberry School House sign

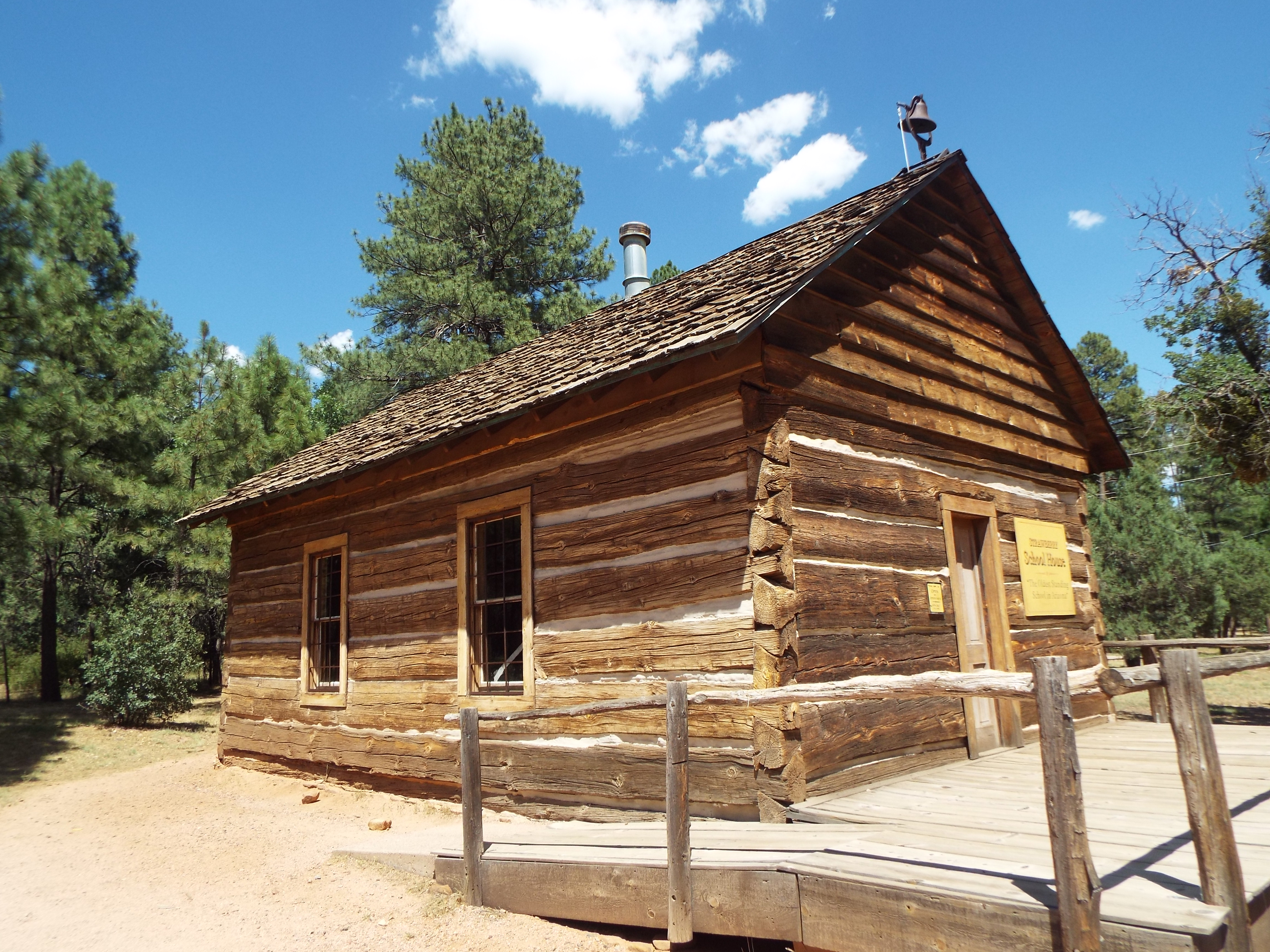
The Strawberry School House

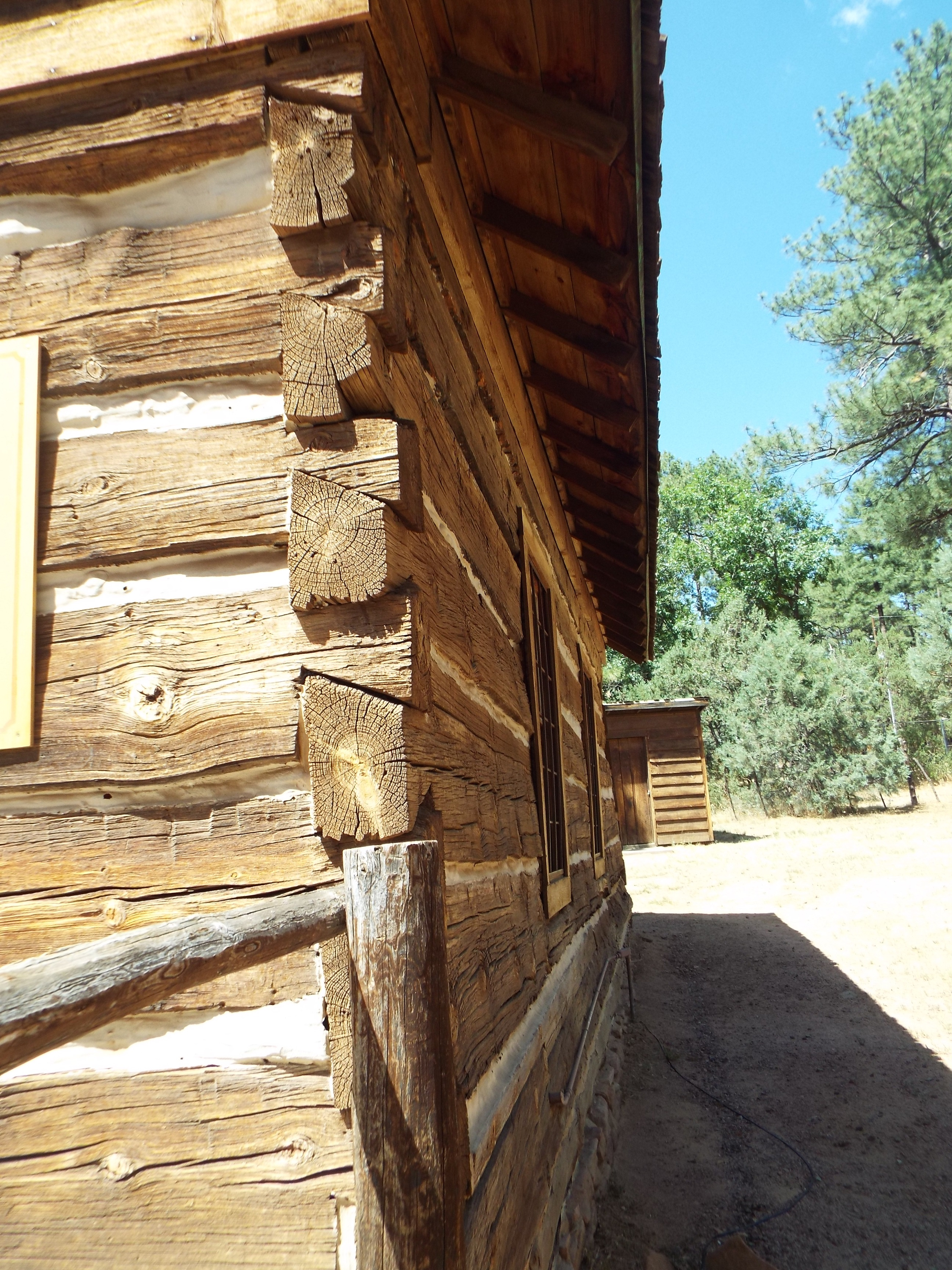
Inter-locking logs of the Strawberry School House

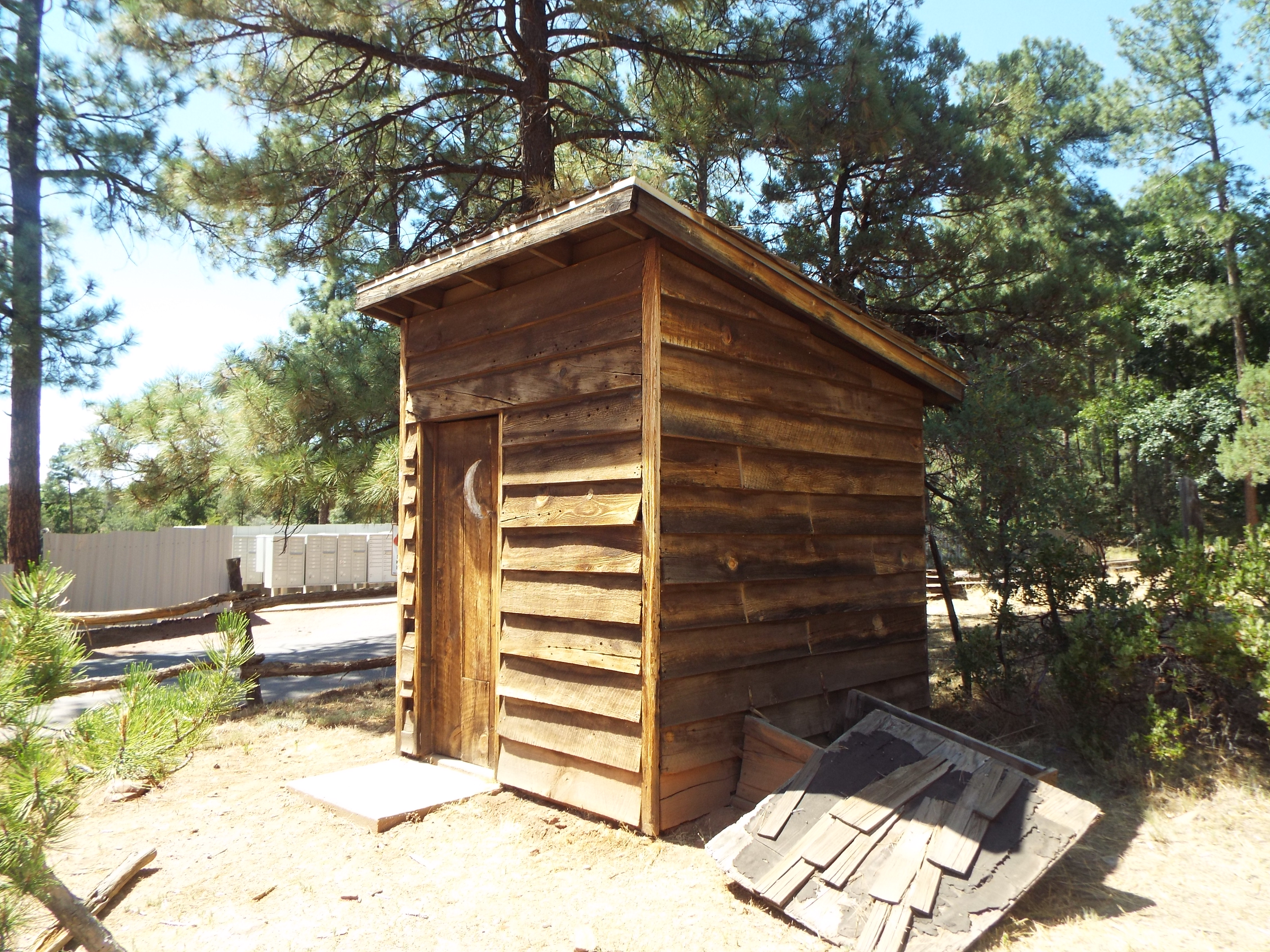
The School's outhouse

The historic Strawberry Cemetery is very small and is located behind the old schoolhouse. Most of the graves are, with the exception of two which have tombstones, unmarked or marked simply with stones and wooden crosses.

Historic Strawberry Cemetery
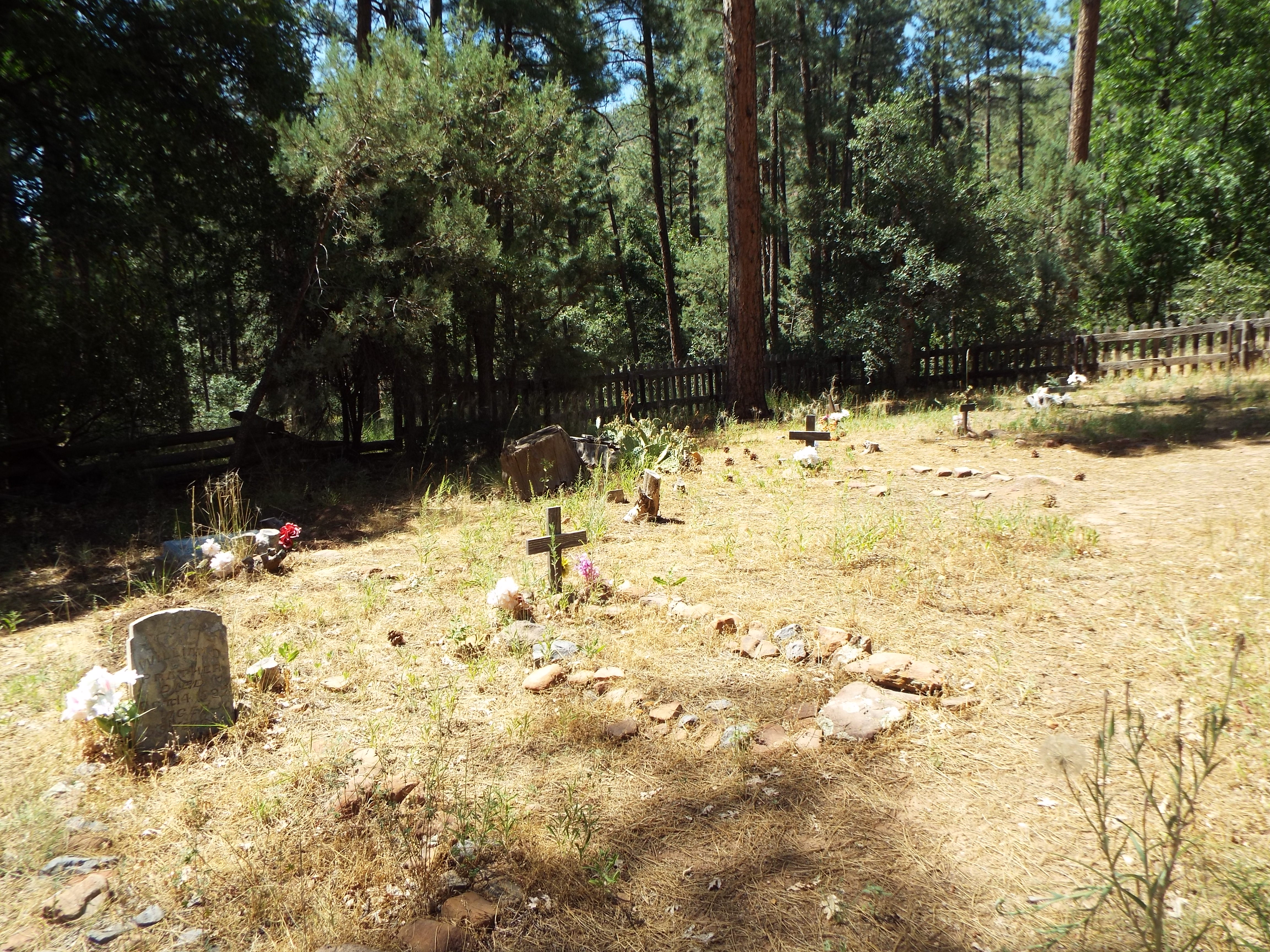
Strawberry Cemetery

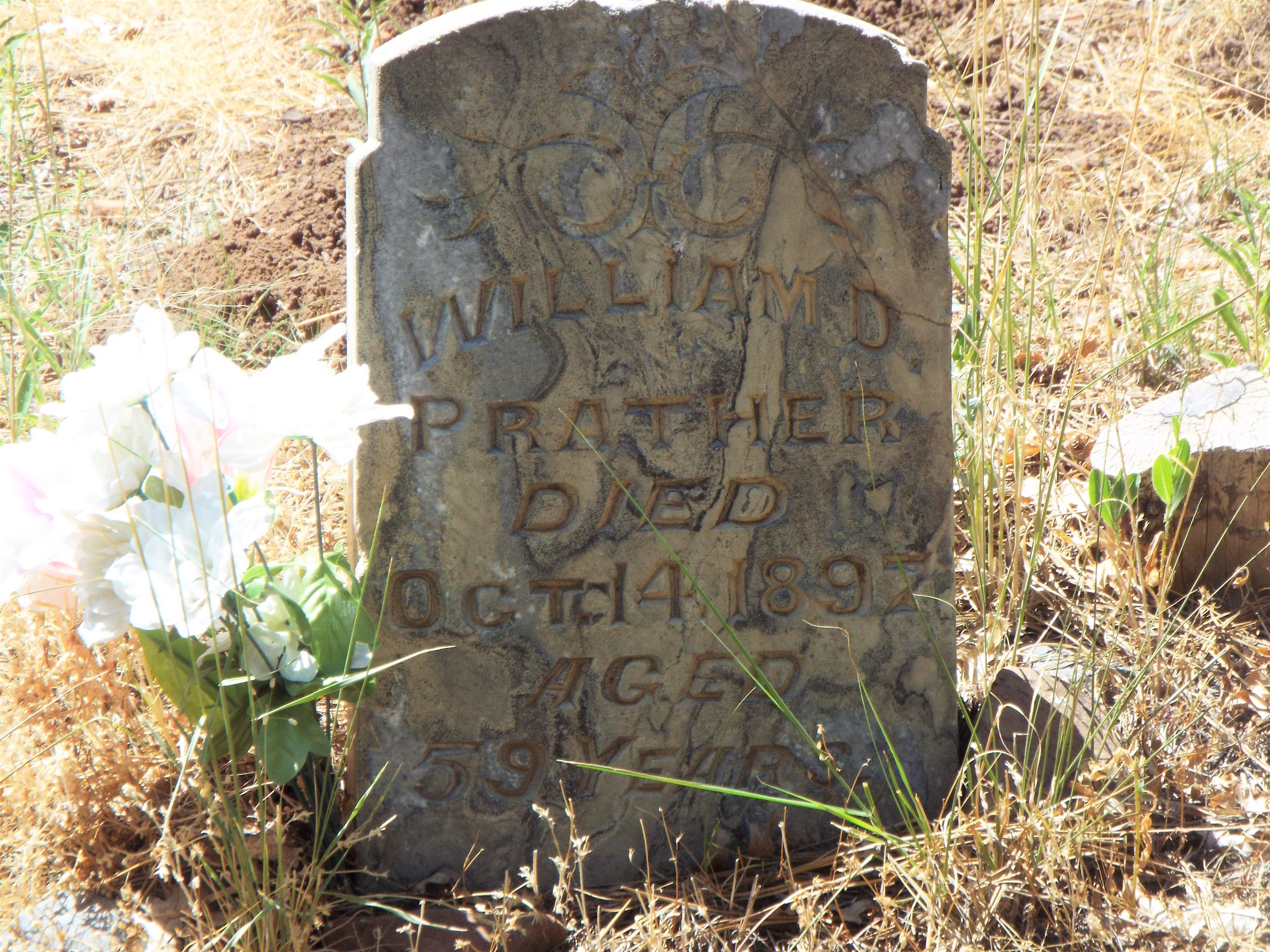
Grave of William D. Prather
(d. 1897)

== Fossil Creek and Bridge ==
According to the United States Department of Agriculture Forest Service, Fossil Creek, which is located in Strawberry, is one of only two National Wild & Scenic rivers in Arizona and is fed by springs coming from the cliffs of the Mongollon Rim. In 2009, the United States Congress designated Fossil Creek as a Wild and Scenic River to protect the river's attributes for years to come. Pictured is the Fossil Creek Bridge. The bridge is a closed-spandrel deck arch bridge built in 1924. It is situated across Fossil Creek.

Historic Fossil Creek Bridge

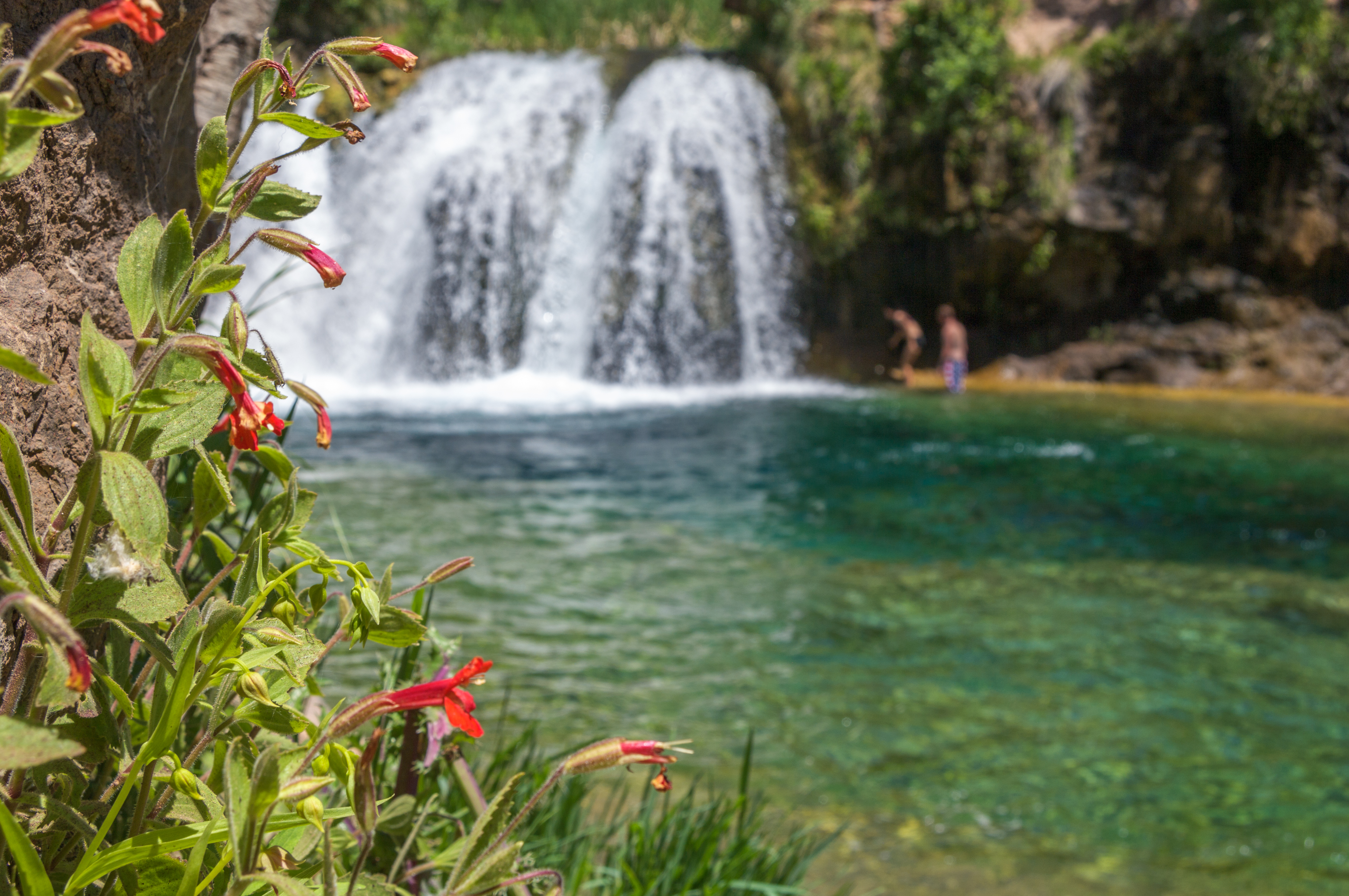
Waterfall in Fossil Creek

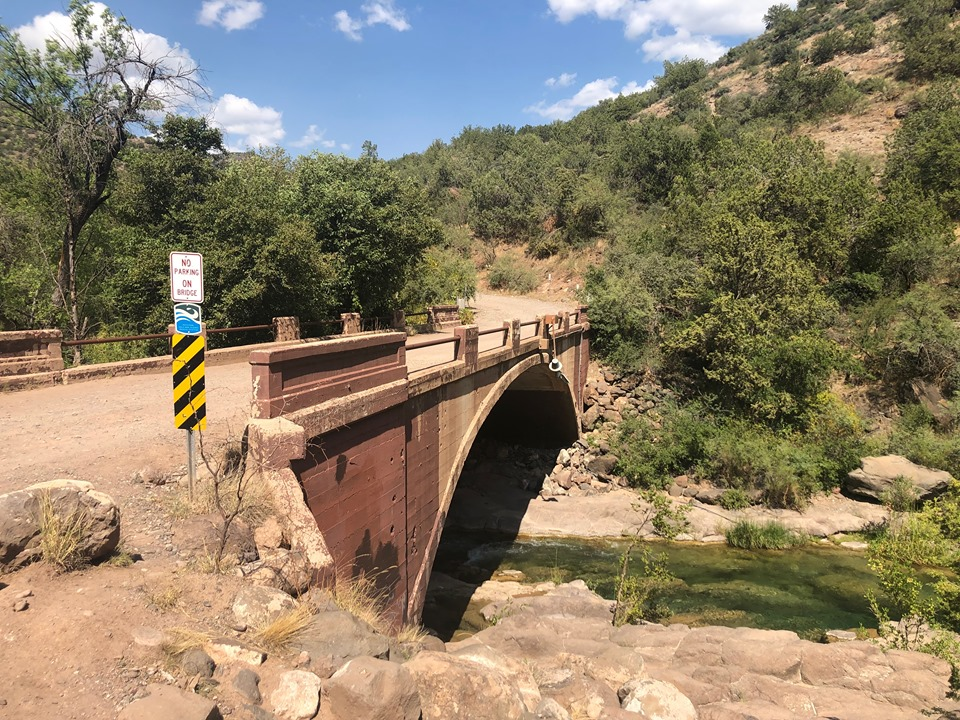
Fossil Creek Bridge

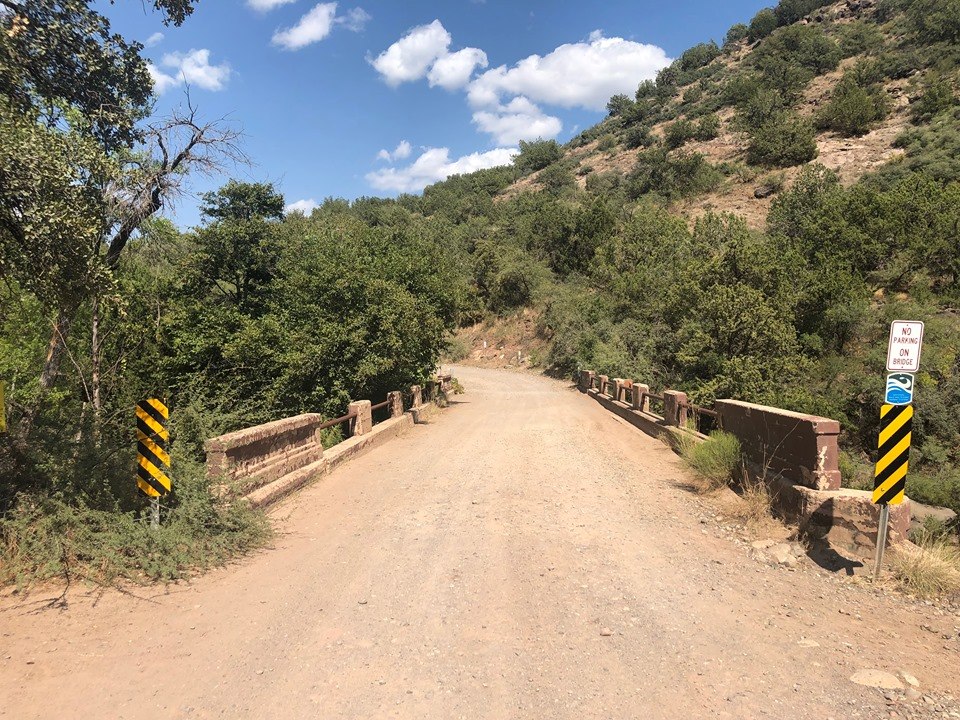
Road on the Fossil Creek Bridge.

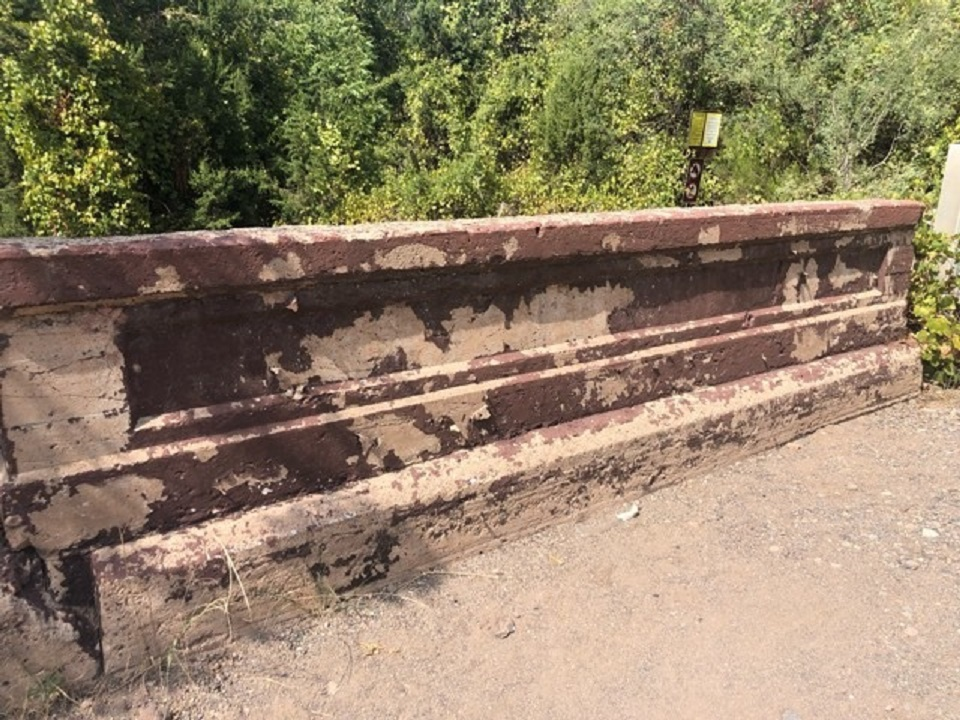
The Fossil Creek Bridge from a different angle

== See also ==
- National Register of Historic Places listings in Gila County, Arizona
