= List of fishes native to Arizona =

The native fishes of Arizona are the species of fish that are found naturally among the inland waterways of Arizona, United States.

== Habitats ==
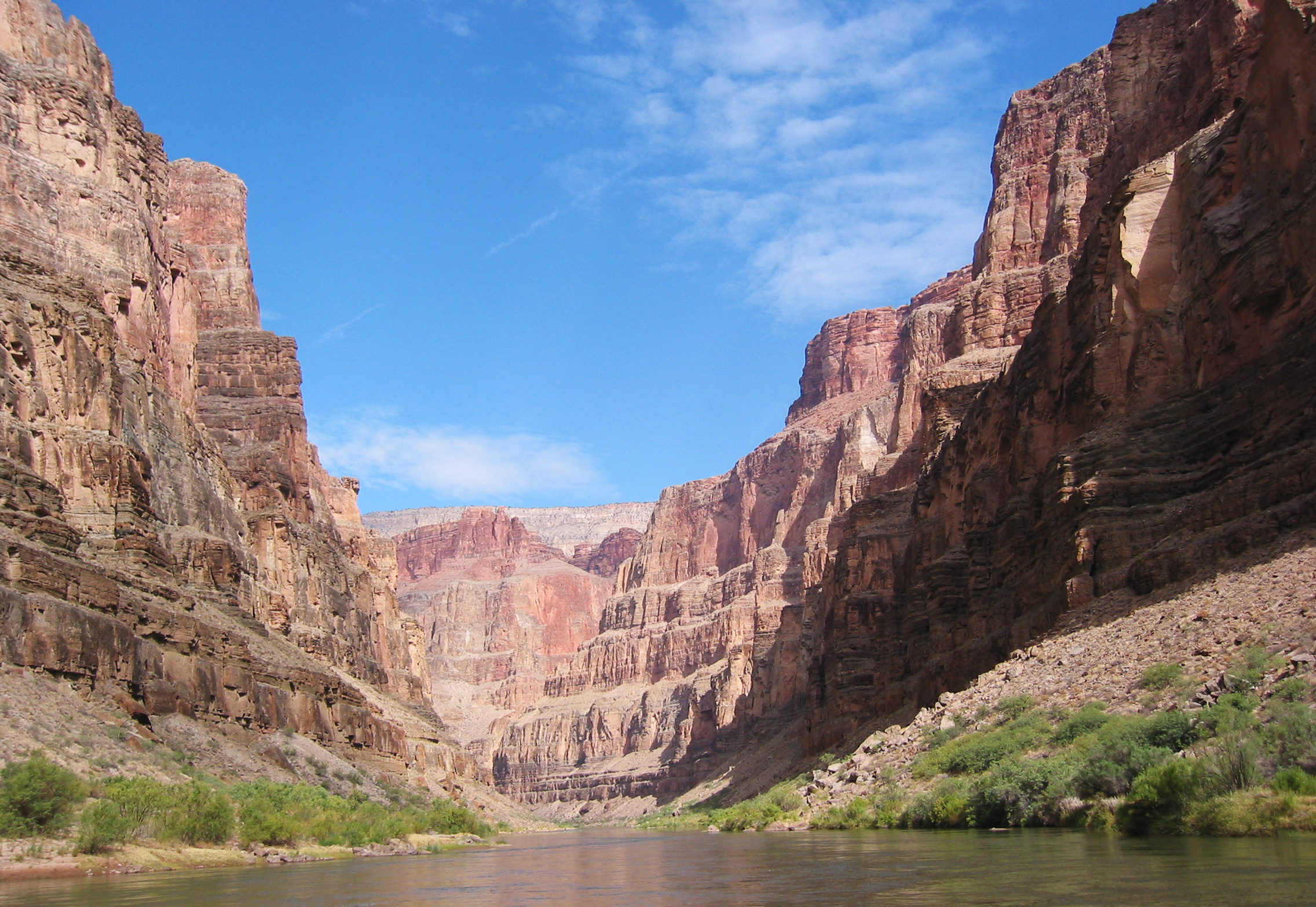
Downstream view of the Colorado River at river mile 175 in the Grand Canyon

Arizona's climate ranges from dry and hot at lower elevations to cold weather on the high mountains. Since water in the state is influenced by the climate, the habitats of Arizona native fishes are diverse. Most habitats for these fishes consist of flowing streams among the inland waterways of Arizona. The state is mostly drained by the Colorado River and its tributary, with the main tributaries being the Gila River, the basin of the Little Colorado River.

Arizona's native fishes are adapted to life in habitats ranging from small springs to the raging torrents of the Colorado River. Their ability to adjust to periods of drought and flash floods has been the key to their survival. Native fishes have not done as well adapting to the influences of humans on their environment. Habitat loss and alteration, and the introduction of non-native species have caused sharp declines in many native populations. With one species already extinct, more than 70 percent listed as Wildlife of Special Concern in Arizona, and over 50 percent federally listed as endangered or threatened, a special and irreplaceable part of Arizona is in danger, as many of these species are now threatened, endangered, or extinct. The state of Arizona first placed native fish on the endangered species list in 1988; however, detrimental human activities including aquifer pumping, reduction in stream flows, and predation from non-native green sunfish, have acted as major contributing factors to the decline of native species. Many smaller rivers and creeks in Arizona are now dry except during periods of heavy rain.

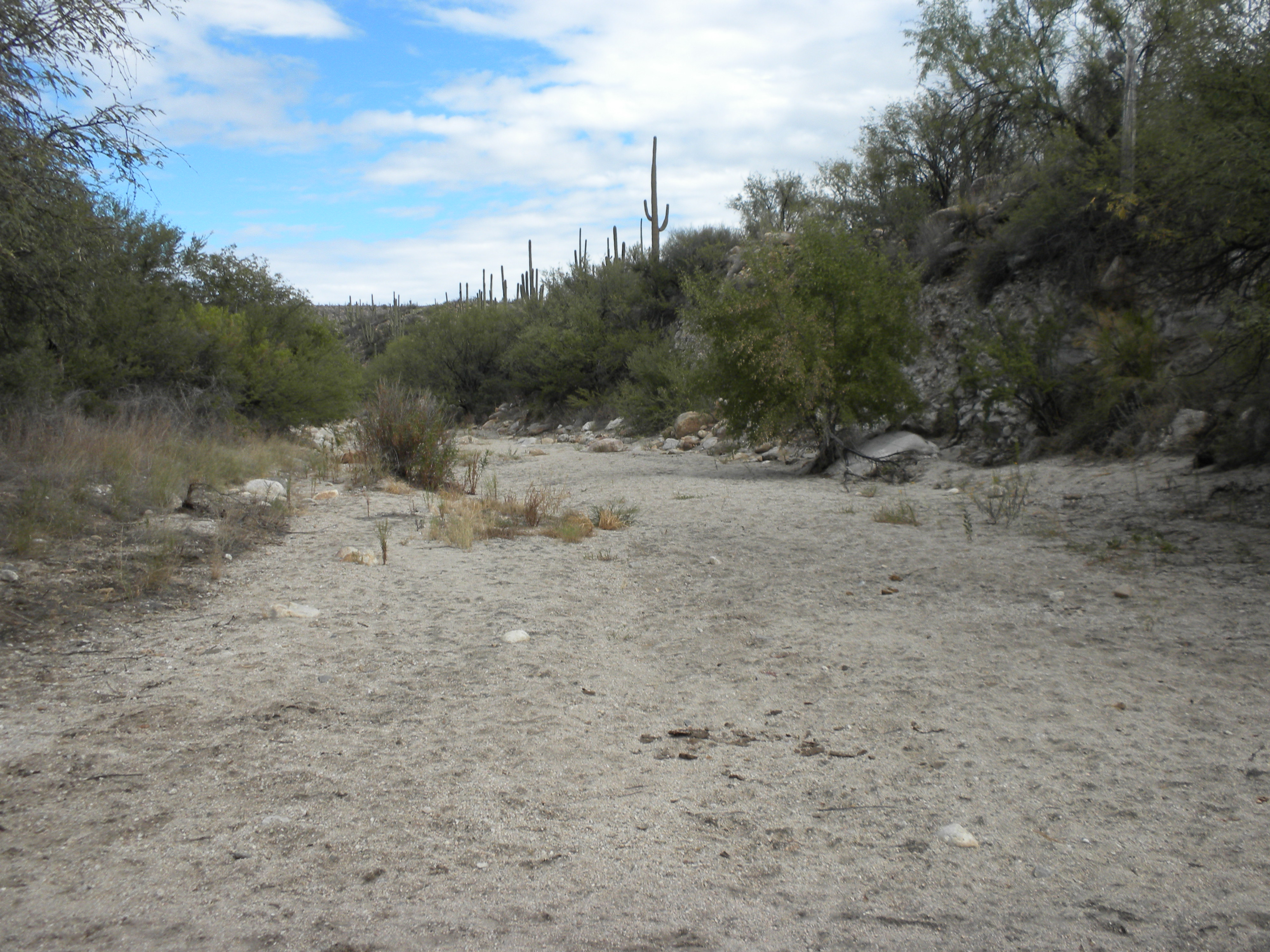
A now-dry stream bed at Santa Catalina Mountain in Tucson, Arizona.

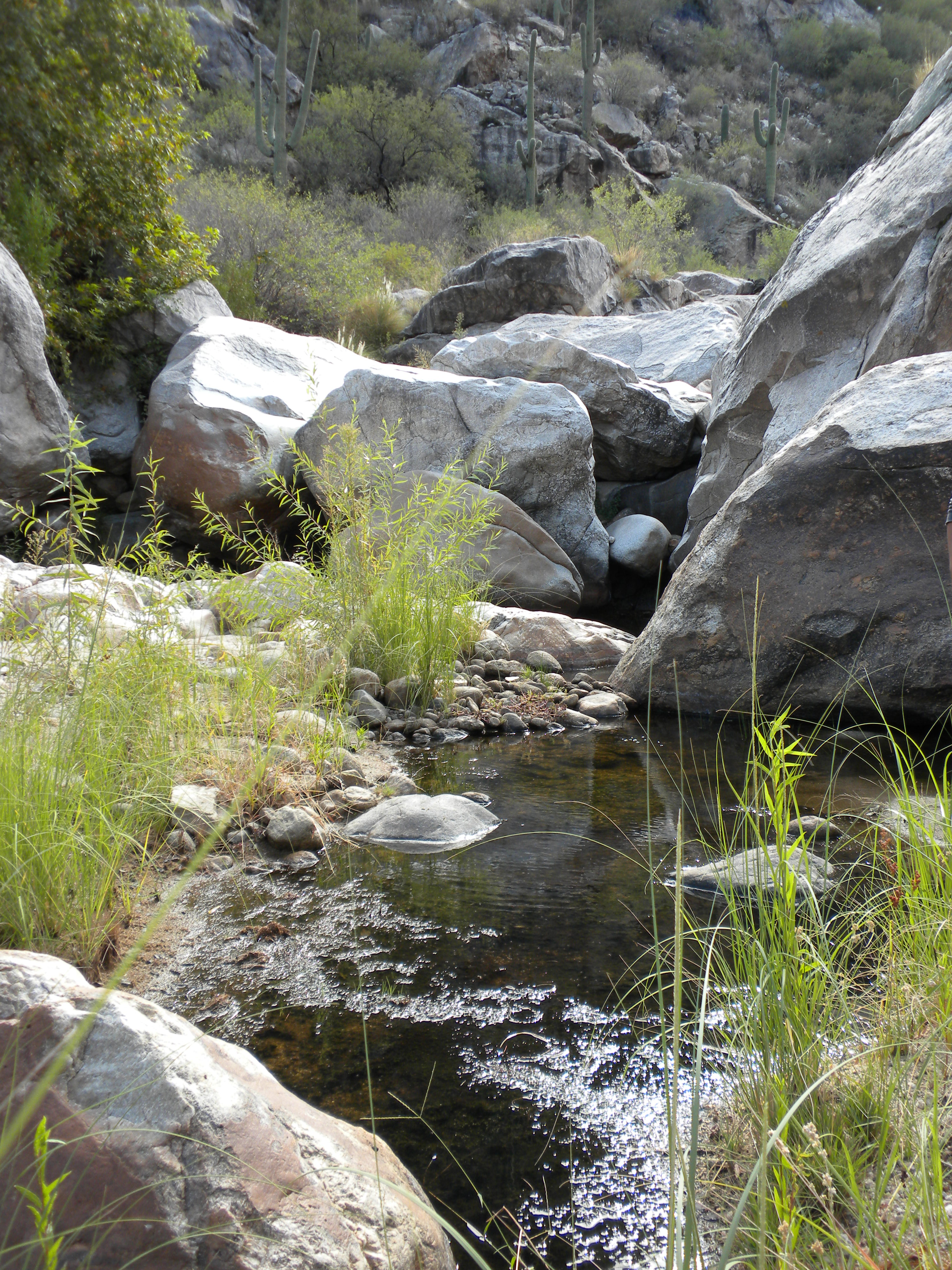
Arizona fishes can also be found in small ponds, such as here at Santa Catalina Mountain in Tucson.

The Arizona Game and Fish Department, along with numerous government agencies, conservation organizations, and many members of the public have become stewards of Arizona's native fish species, working to preserve a link to the past and to serve as a legacy to future generations. The San Bernardino Ranch has plans to reintroduce new fish specimens in an attempt to recharge Arizona native fish. Other projects involve the protection of native fish habitat on federal lands. A large decline in wetlands and riparian zones are the major factor in the decline of native fish, due to agriculture, outwelling, dredging, and flood control.

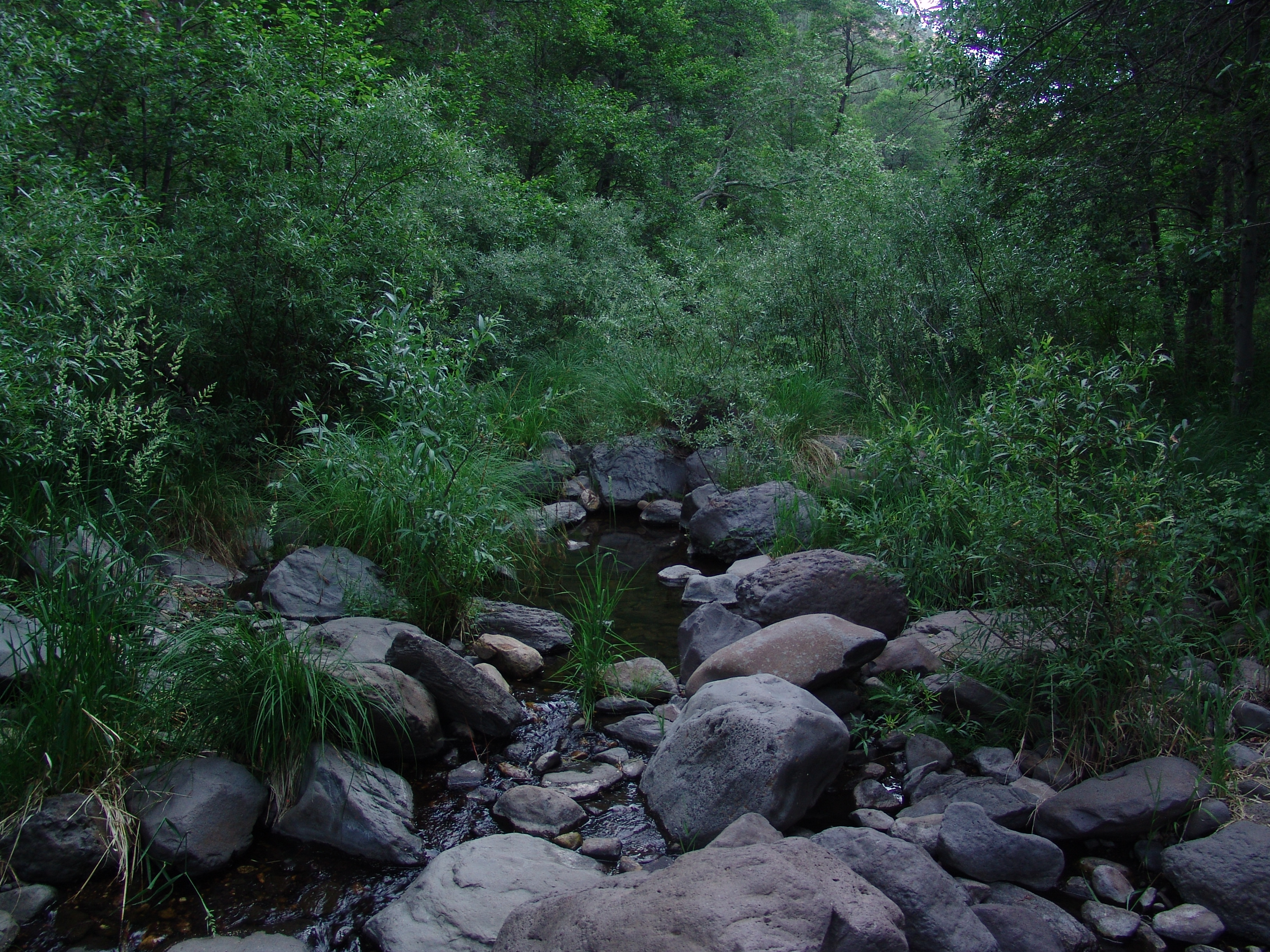
Montane perennial stream and riparian habitat in central/northern Arizona.

Reservoirs, lakes and ponds provide quiet-water habitat, which ranges from cold water lakes to hot desert pools. The largest standing bodies of water in Arizona includes lakes Powell, Mead, Mohave, and Havasu, all are formed by impoundment of the Colorado River. Small reservoirs are generally most common at intermediate and high elevations, and developed in many cases for recreational purposes.

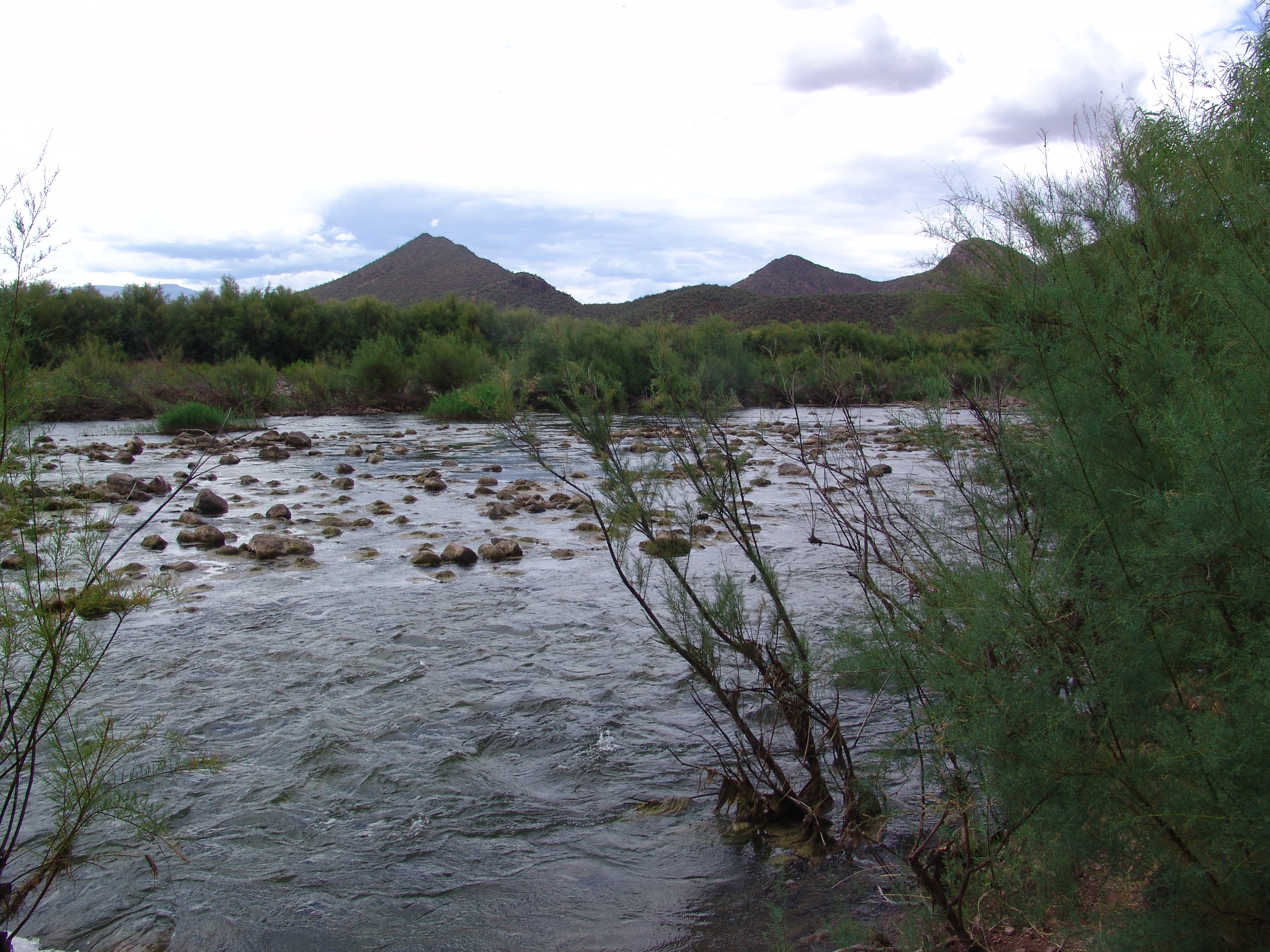
Lower elevation river habitat in central Arizona.

== Protection status under the Endangered Species Act of 1973 ==
Binomial name	Common name	Protection status
Agosia chrysogaster chrysogaster	Longfin dace	Not protected
Agosia chrysogaster sp 1	Yaqui longfin dace	Not protected
Campostoma ornatum	Mexican stoneroller	Not protected
Catostomus benardini	Yaqui sucker	Not protected
Catostomus clarki	Desert sucker	Not protected
Catostomus discobolus	Bluehead sucker	Not protected
Catostomus discobolus yarrowi	Zuni bluehead sucker	Endangered
Catostomus insignis	Sonora sucker	Not protected
Catostomus latipinnis	Flannelmouth sucker	Not protected
Catostomus sp. 3	Little Colorado River sucker	Not protected
Cyprinella formosa	Beautiful shiner	Threatened
Cyprinodon arcuatus	Santa Cruz pupfish	Extinct
Cyprinodon eremus	Rio Sonoyta pupfish	Endangered
Cyprinodon macularius	Desert pupfish	Endangered
Elops affinis	Pacific tenpounder or machete	Not protected
Gila cypha	Humpback chub	Endangered
Gila ditaenia	Sonora chub	Threatened
Gila elegans	Bonytail chub	Endangered
Gila intermedia	Gila chub	Endangered
Gila nigra	Headwater chub	Not protected/candidate
Gila purpurea	Yaqui chub	Endangered
Gila robusta	Roundtail chub	Not protected/candidate
Gila seminuda	Virgin chub	Endangered
Ictalurus pricei	Yaqui catfish	Threatened
Lepidomeda mollispinis mollispinis	Virgin spinedace	Not protected
Lepidomeda vittata	Little Colorado River spinedace	Threatened
Meda fulgida	Spikedace	Endangered
Mugil cephalus	Striped mullet	Not protected
Oncorhynchus apache	Apache trout	Threatened
Oncorhyncus gilae	Gila trout	Threatened
Plagopterus argentissimus	Woundfin	Endangered
Poeciliopsis occidentalis occidentalis	Gila topminnow	Endangered
Poeciliopsis occidentalis sonorensis	Yaqui topminnow	Endangered
Ptychcheilus lucius	Colorado pikeminnow	Endangered
Rhinichthys osculus	Speckled dace	Not protected
Tiaroga cobitis	Loach minnow	Endangered
Xyrauchen texanus	Razorback sucker	Endangered

== Gallery ==
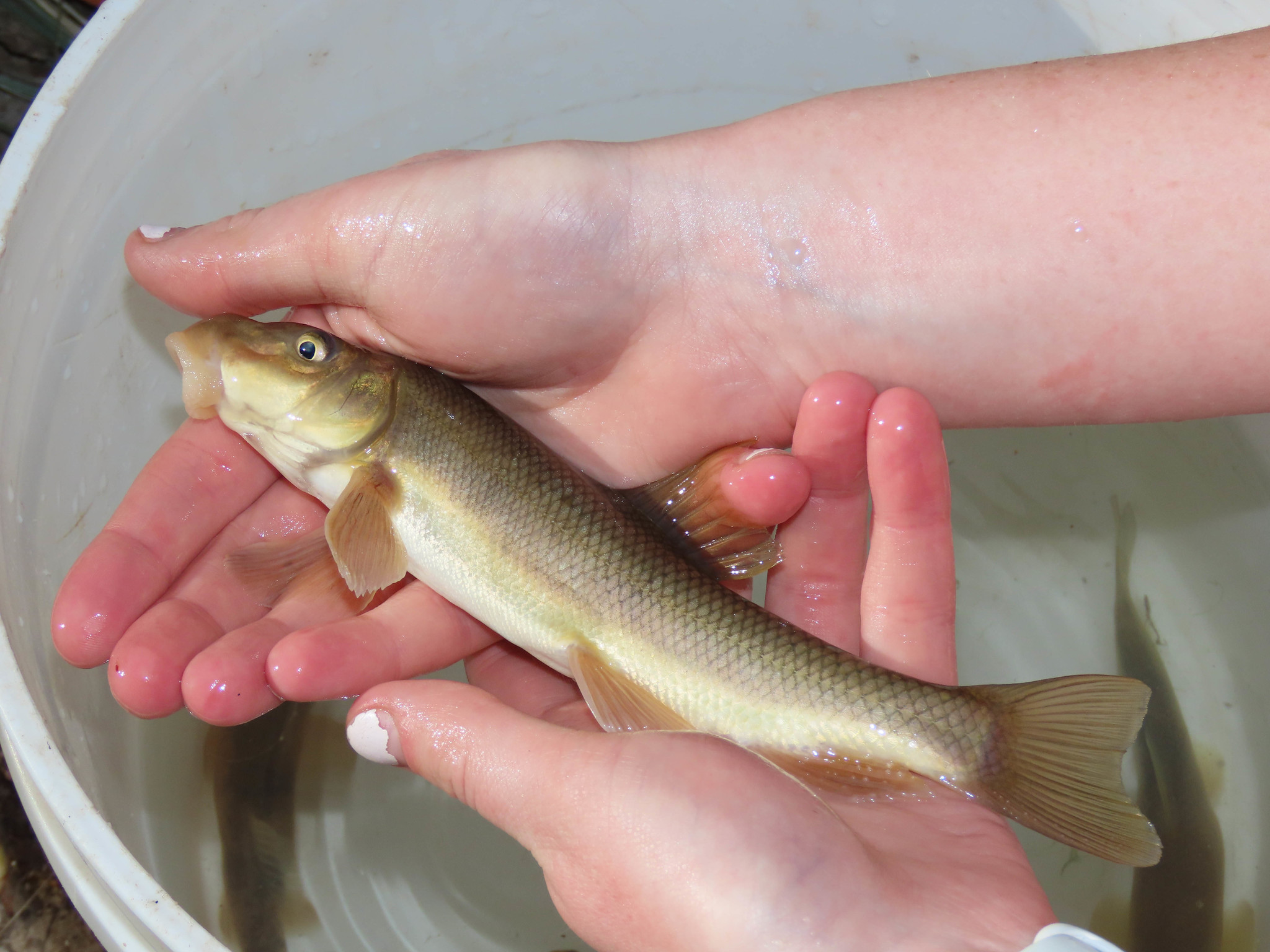
Sonora sucker

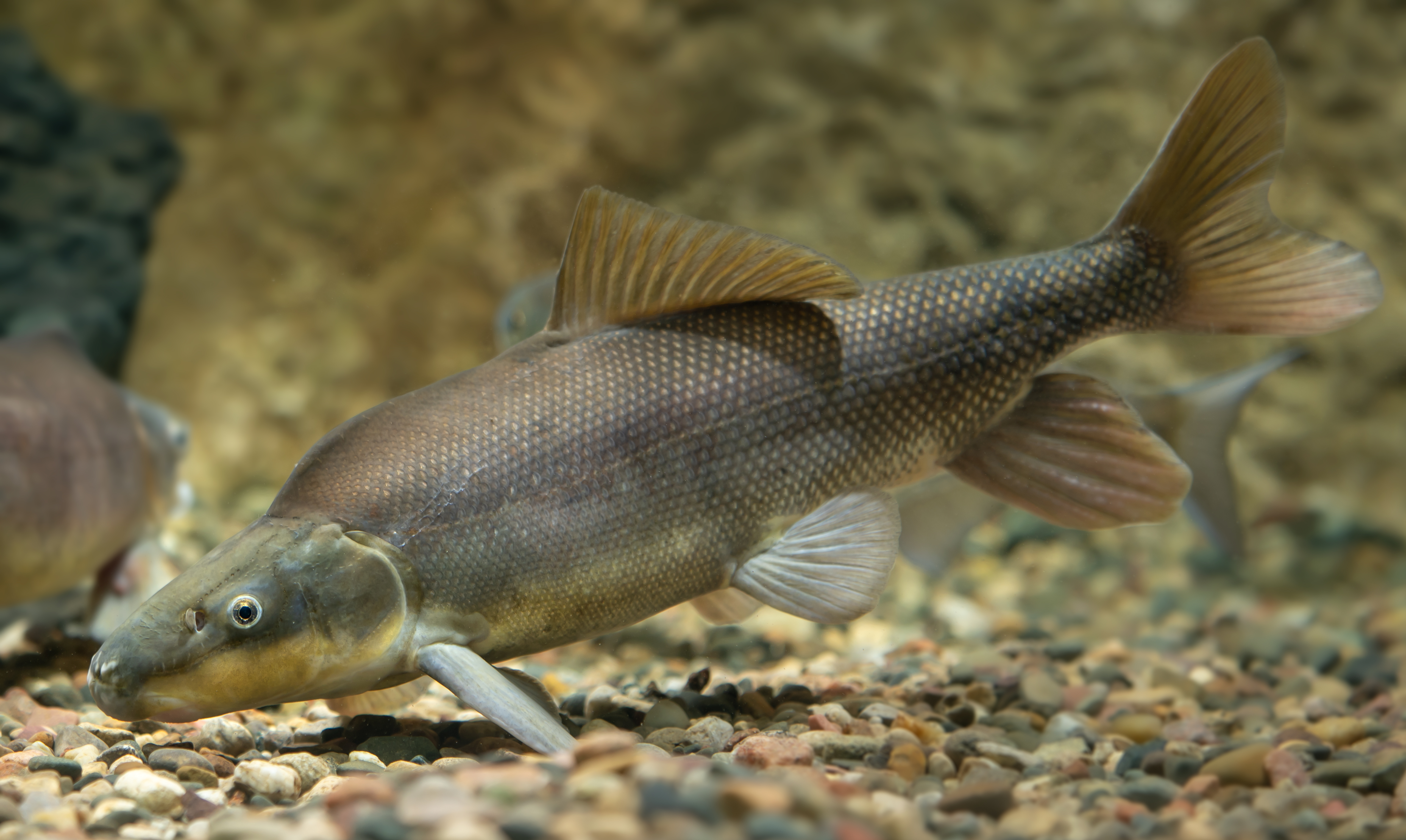
Razorback sucker

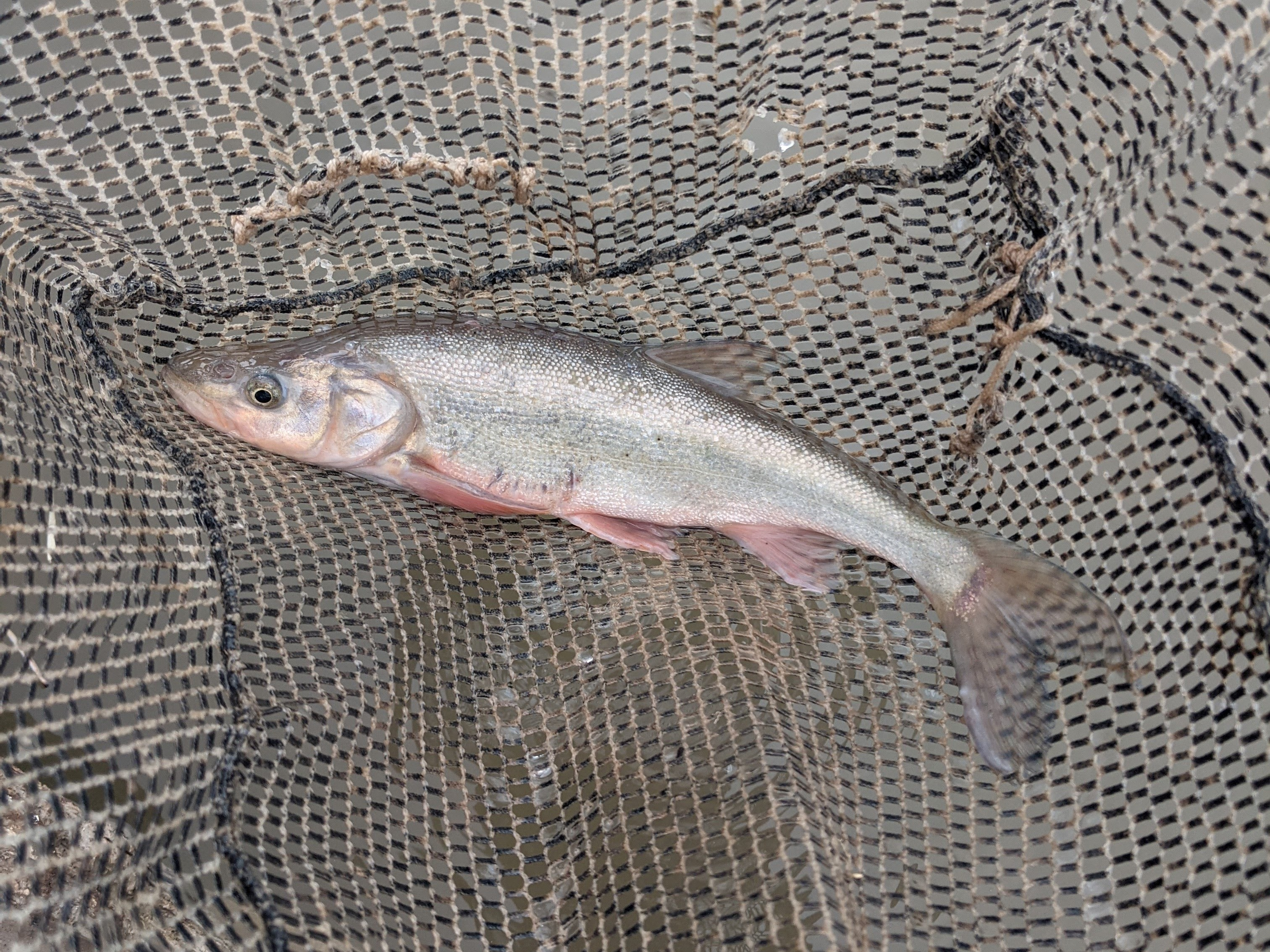
Roundtail chub

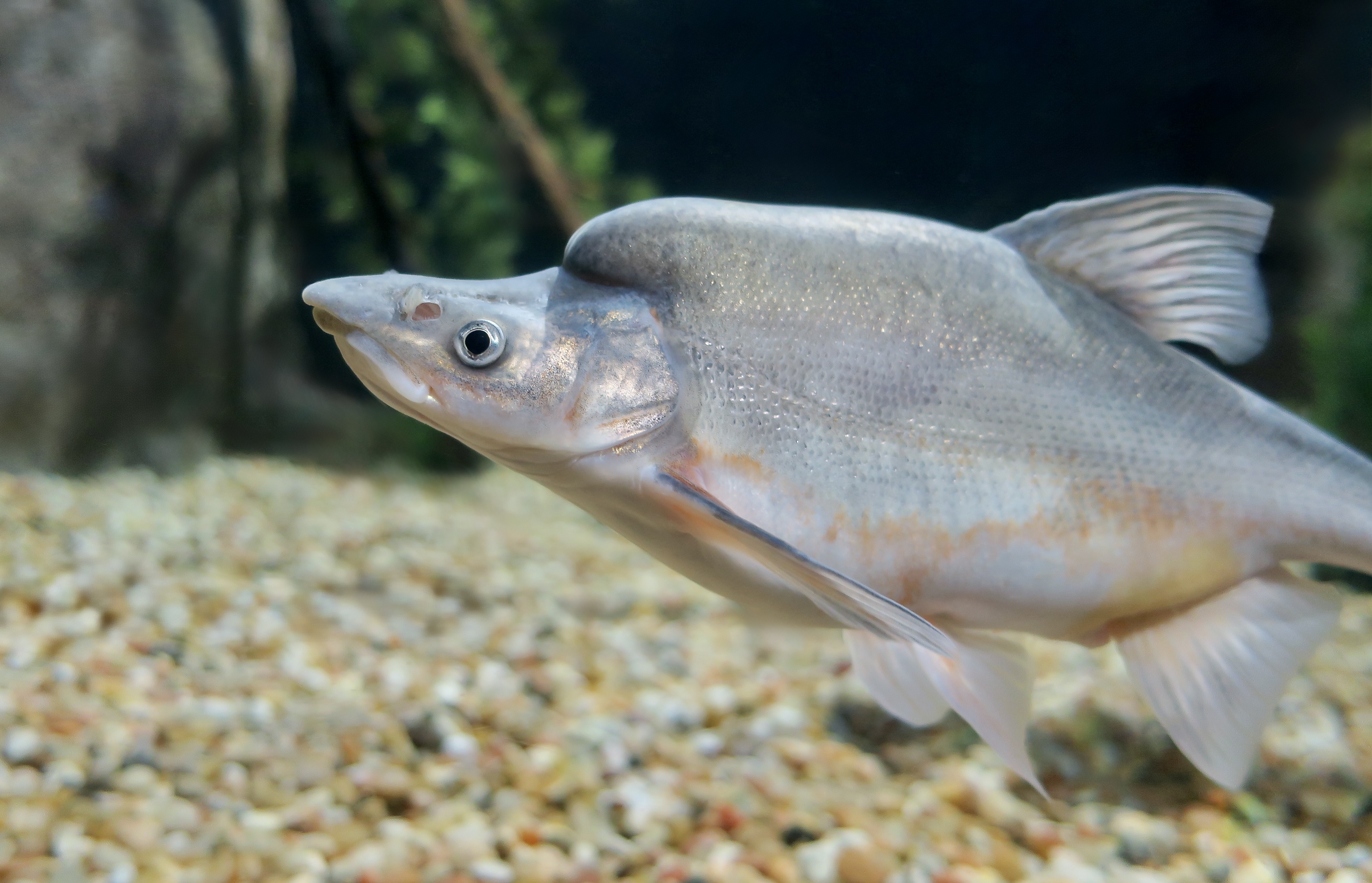
Humpback chub

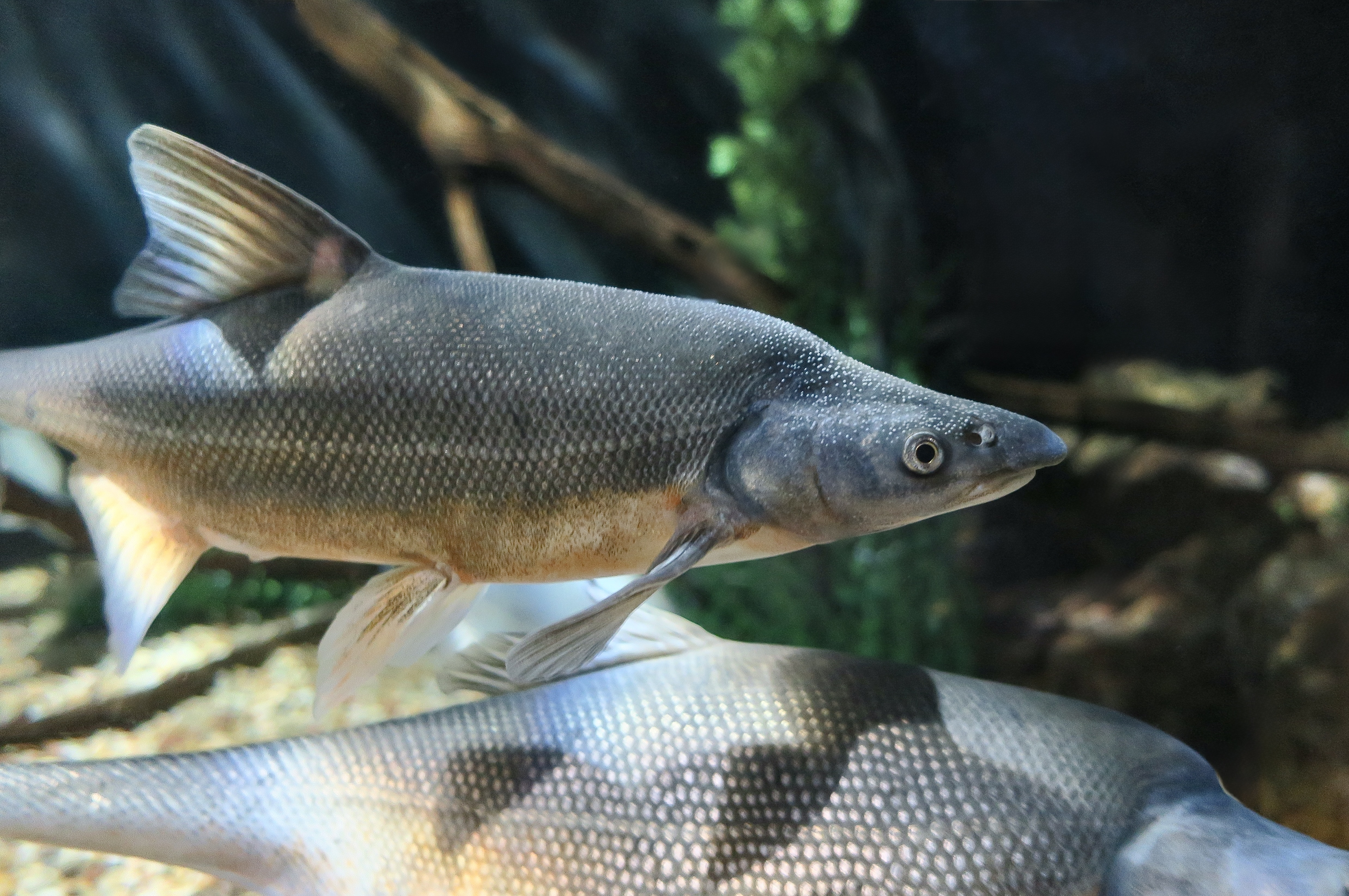
Bonytail chub

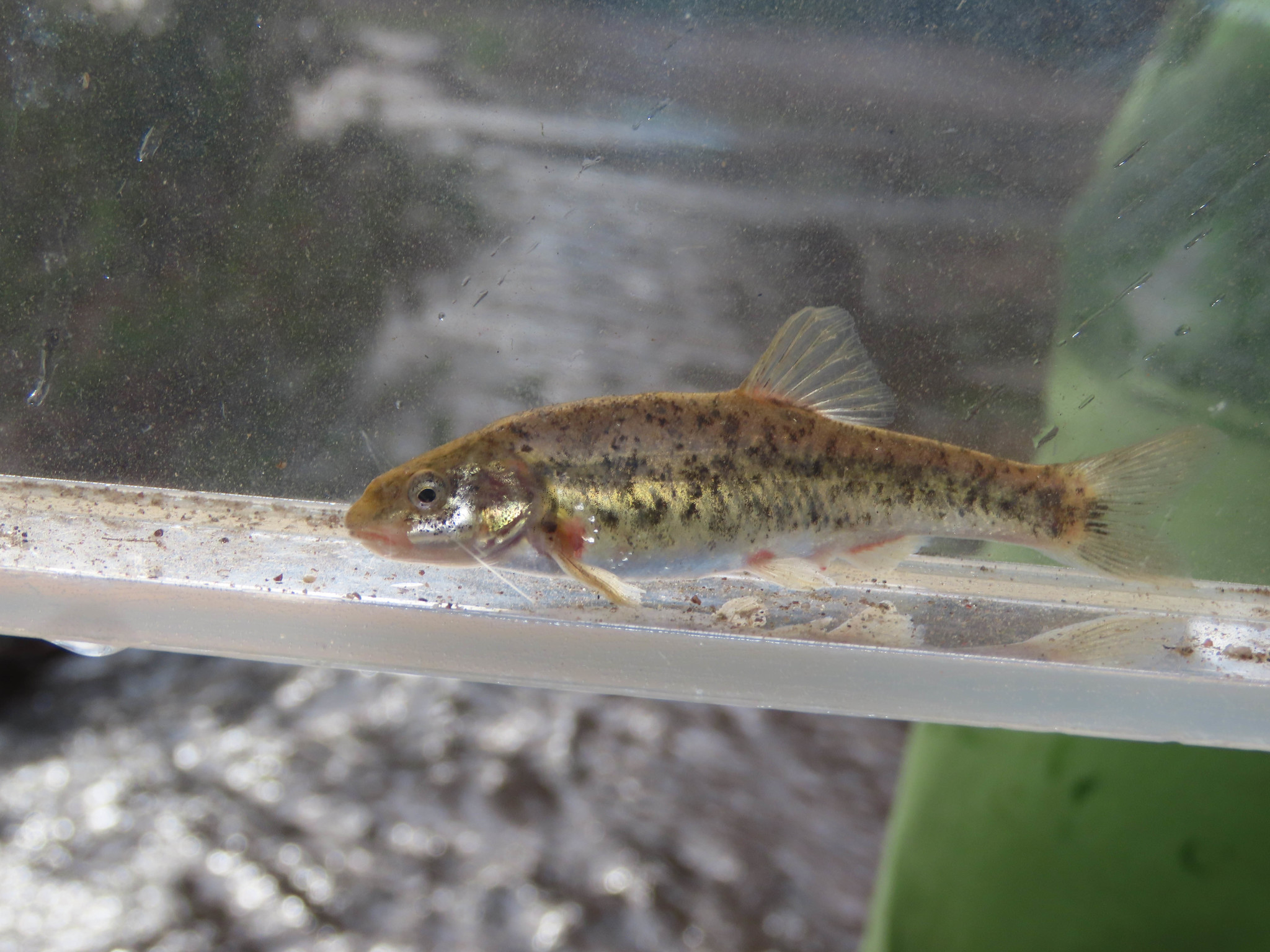
Speckled dace

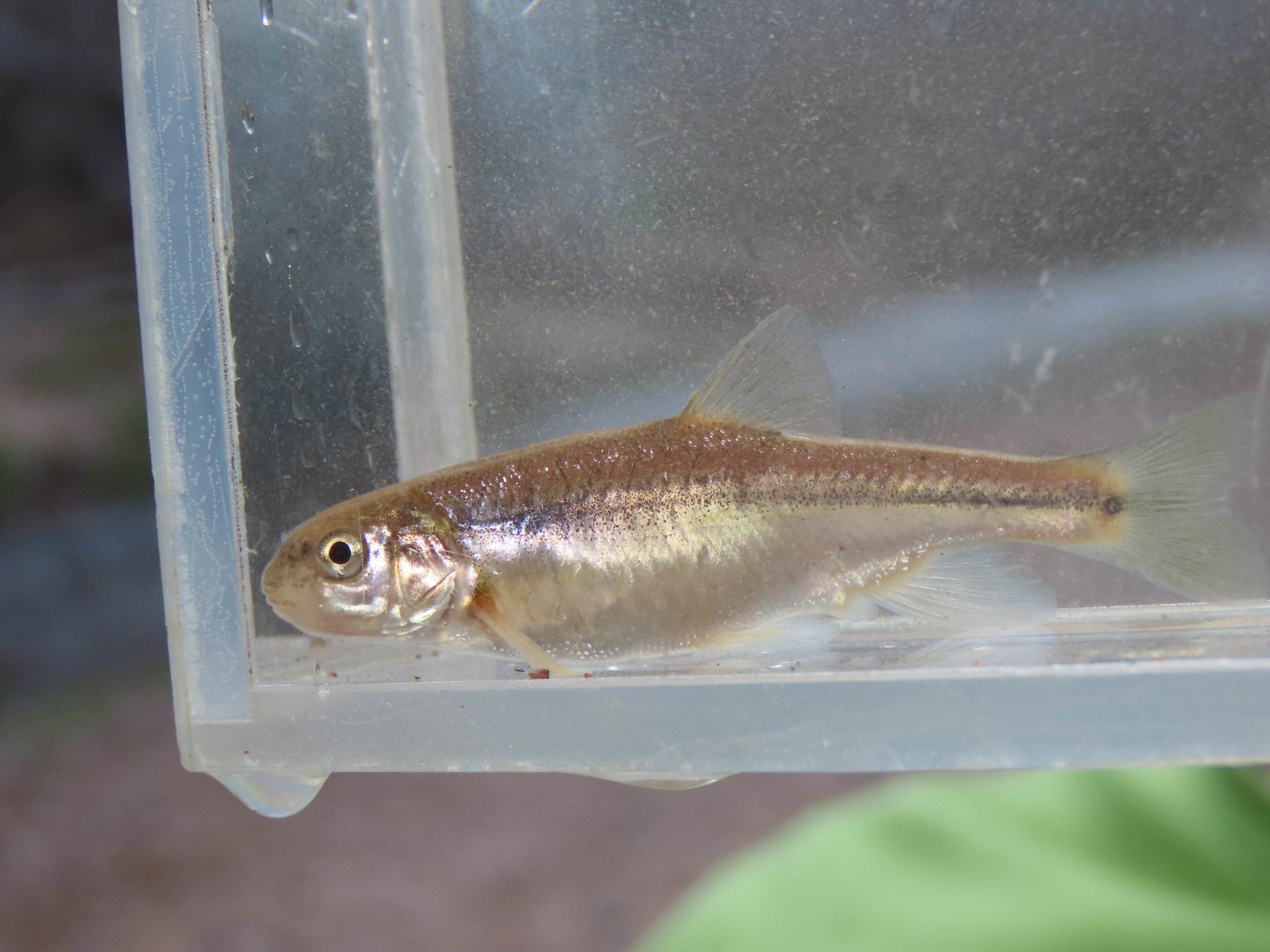
Longfin dace caught in Arizona

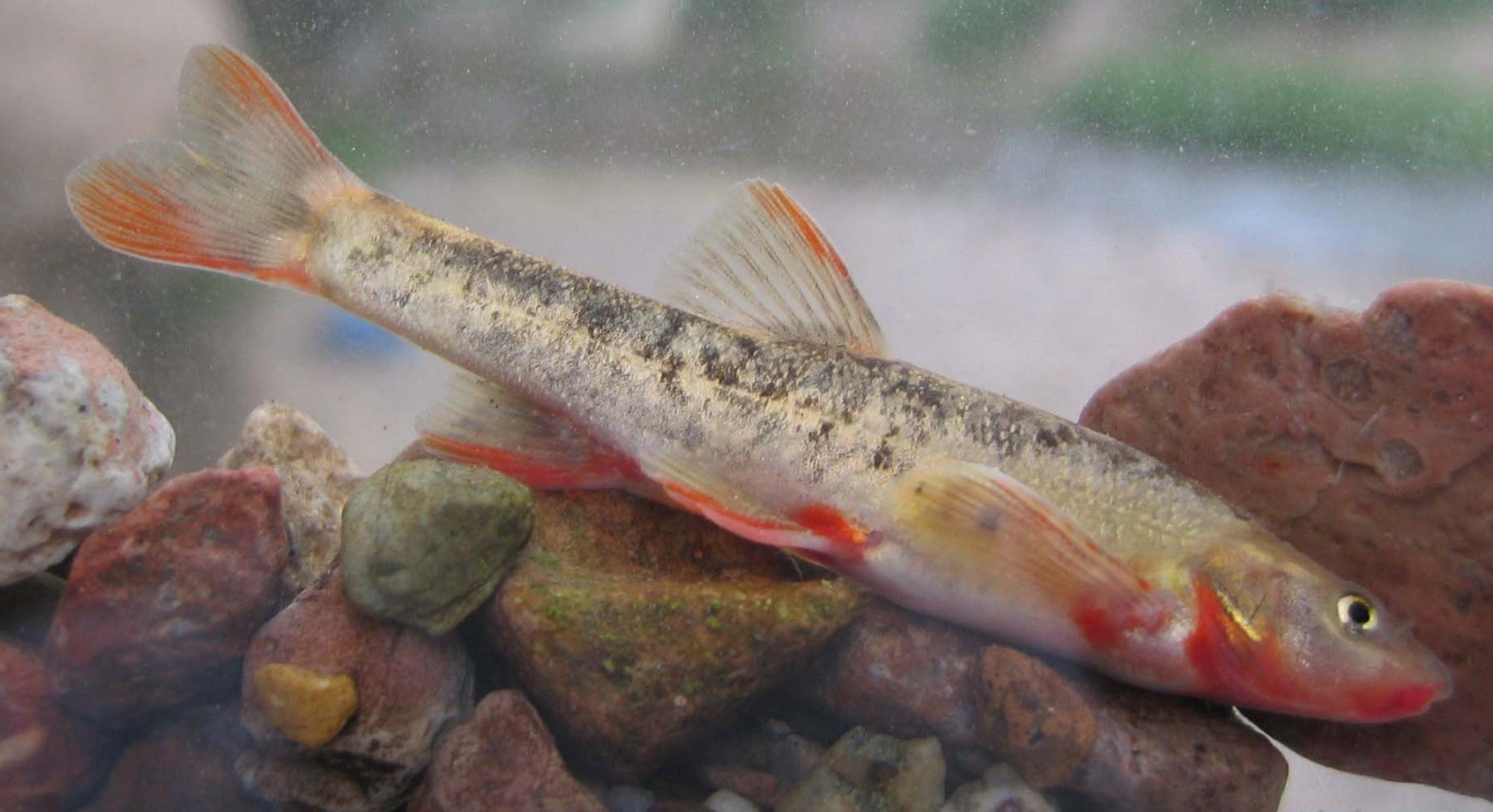
Loach minnow

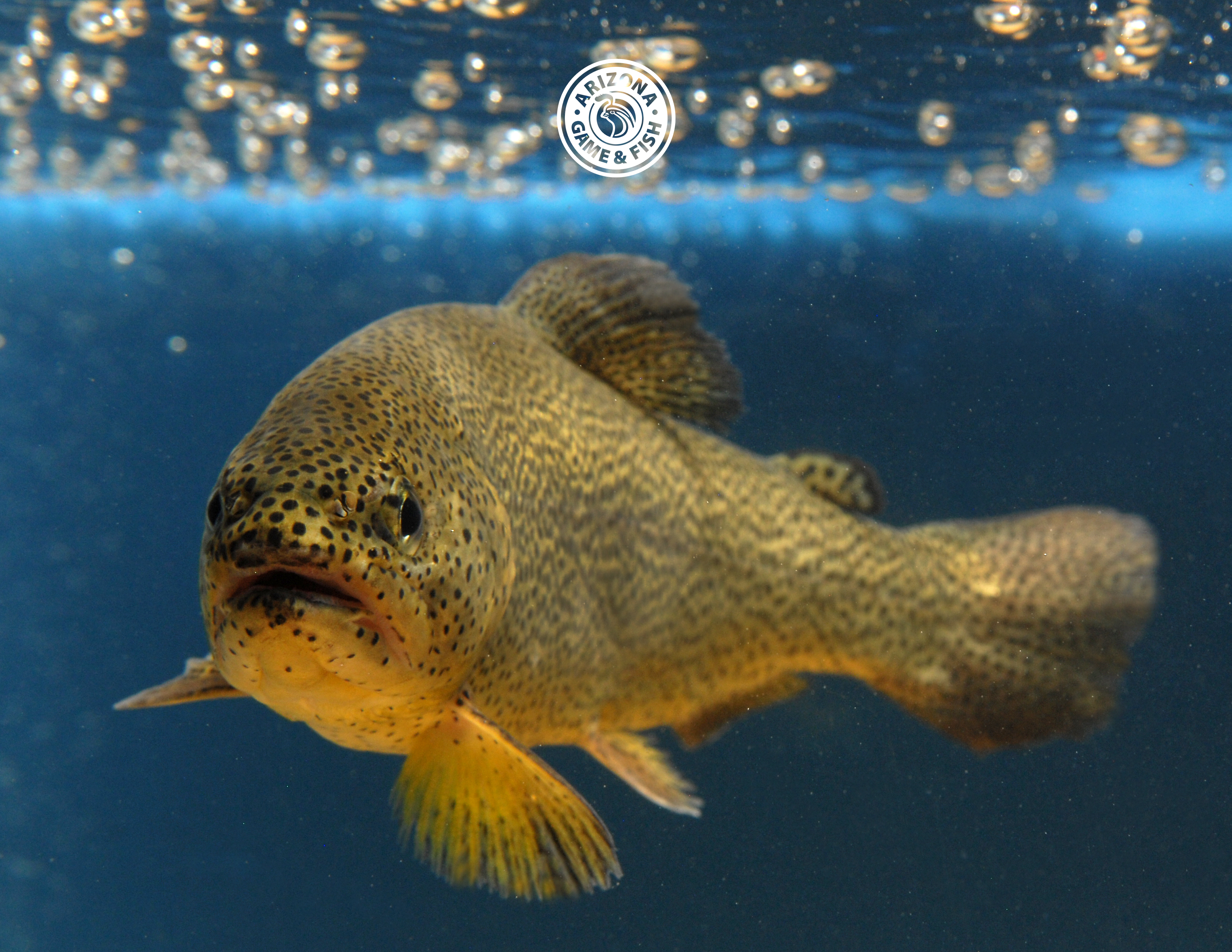
Apache trout

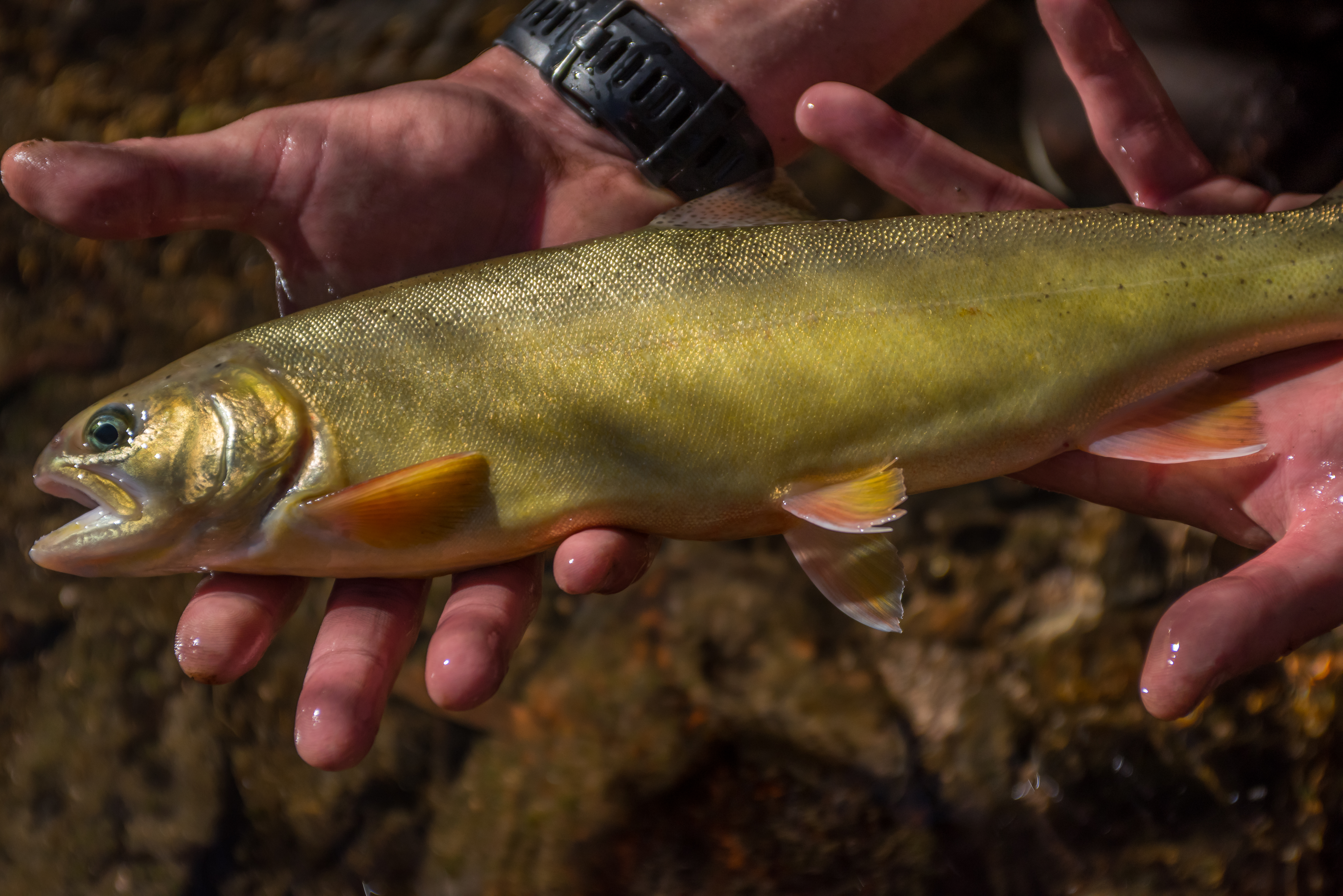
Gila trout
