= Fish species of Aravaipa Canyon =

Aravaipa Creek is a tributary of the San Pedro River that runs through Aravaipa Canyon, including the BLM Aravaipa Canyon Wilderness area, in Graham County and Pinal County of southeastern Arizona, It is home to seven native fish species, all of which are found naturally in this location. Although each of these species can be found in various other tributaries of the San Pedro and surrounding river systems, Arizona's native fish species are, in general, among the most imperiled in the United States and many efforts are being made to conserve them. This includes protecting their habitat from disturbance by humans and encroachment by non-native species that could potentially out-compete the native ones.

== Native species ==
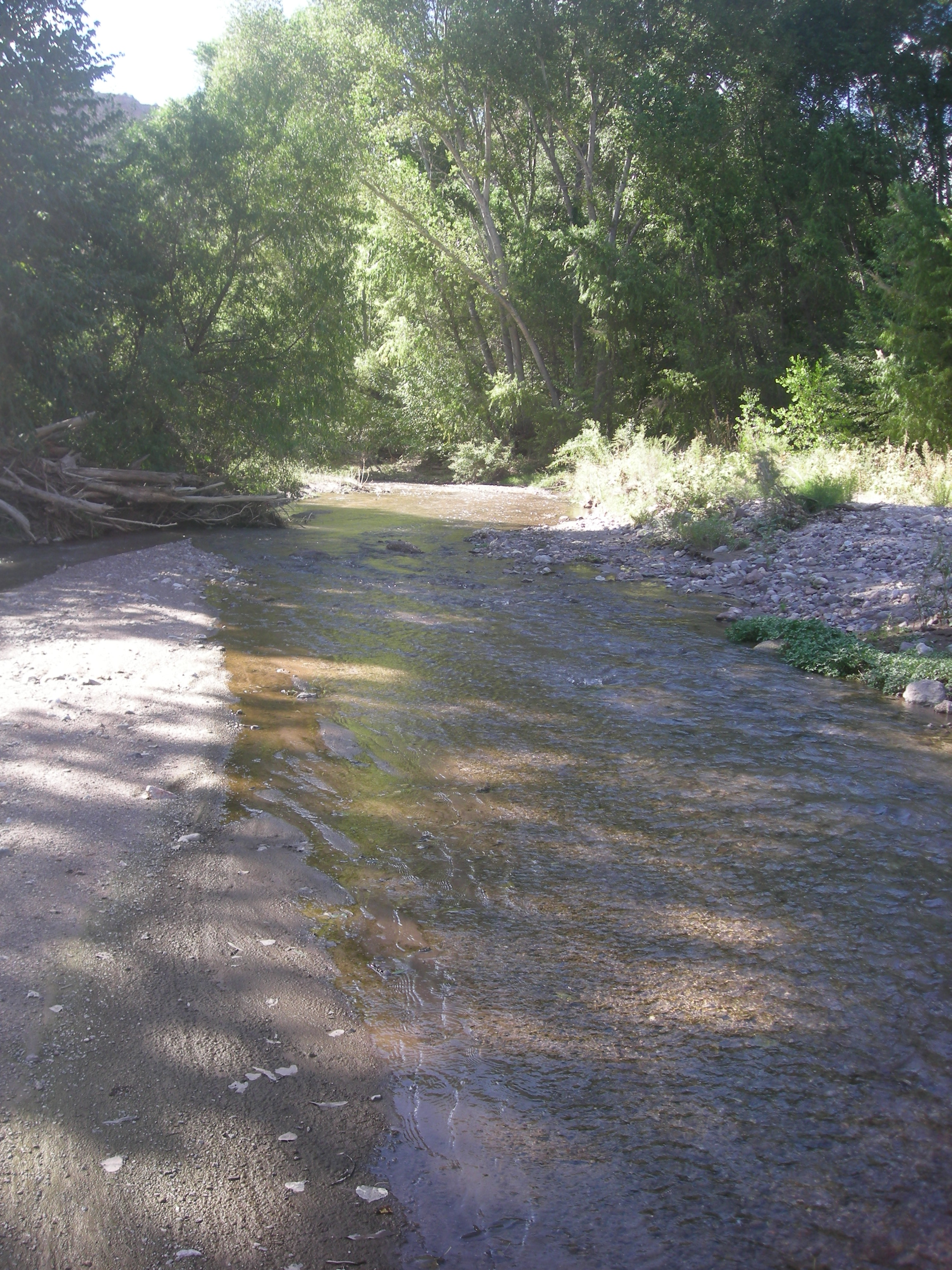
View of Aravaipa Canyon habitat

Binomial nomenclature	Common name	Protection status
Agosia chrysogaster chrysogaster	Gila Longfin Dace	Near Threatened
Catostomus clarki	Desert Sucker	Near Threatened
Catostomus insignis	Sonora Sucker	Near Threatened
Gila robusta	Roundtail Chub	Near Threatened
Meda fulgida	Spikedace	Endangered
Rhinichthys osculus	Speckled Dace	Near Threatened
Tiaroga cobitis	Loach Minnow	Endangered

== Habitat ==
Aravaipa Creek provides rich freshwater habitat for its native fish species. Depending on the location along the canyon, there can be both flowing sections and still side-pools. The flowing water can be any combination of fast or slow, deep or shallow, open or protected by tree roots and undercut banks, and shaded by vegetation on the bank or exposed to full sunlight. This variation ensures that a relatively large number of fish species are able to find suitable habitat for themselves within the confines of the canyon.

== Invasive species ==
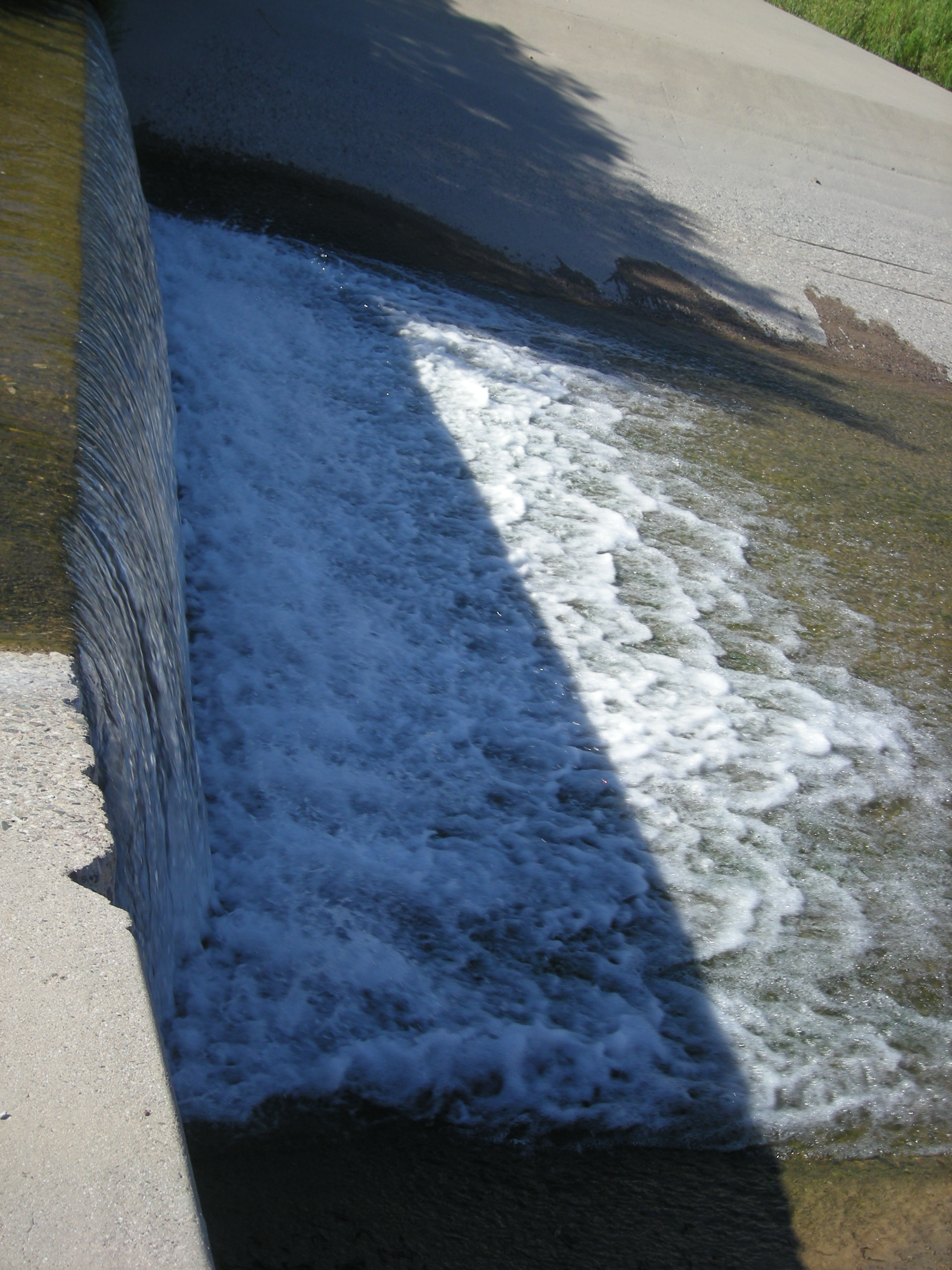
A fish barrier in Aravaipa Canyon

Binomial nomenclature	Common name
Cyprinella lutrensis	Red Shiner
Ameiurus natalis	Yellow Bullhead
Lepomis cyanellus	Green Sunfish

Aravaipa Canyon is protected from disturbance in part by the Aravaipa Canyon Wilderness Area (managed by the Bureau of Land Management) and the Aravaipa Canyon Preserve (managed by The Nature Conservancy). However, non-native invasive species such as those listed above have become an increasing concern in Aravaipa Canyon. Non-native species are only termed "invasive" when they have a negative impact on the ecosystem into which they are introduced. It is believed that these invasives are contributing to the decline in the number of native fishes found from year to year in the canyon. They are credited with outcompeting the native fish for resources such as food and habitat. They are a generalist species, meaning they are adapted to suit a variety of ecological niches. They therefore have the potential to exploit the general location more than any one of the native fish species can, being as specialized as they are to a single niche. The Nature Conservancy in particular is actively managing the native fish populations and working towards restoring them to their previous abundance by conducting projects such as fish monitoring and removal of non-native species. Initiatives have also been put in place to attempt to slow the progress of invasive species up Aravaipa Creek. One such endeavor is the construction of fish barriers, which are low concrete walls spanning the water, creating an artificial series of waterfalls that the invasives cannot pass.

== Monitoring projects ==
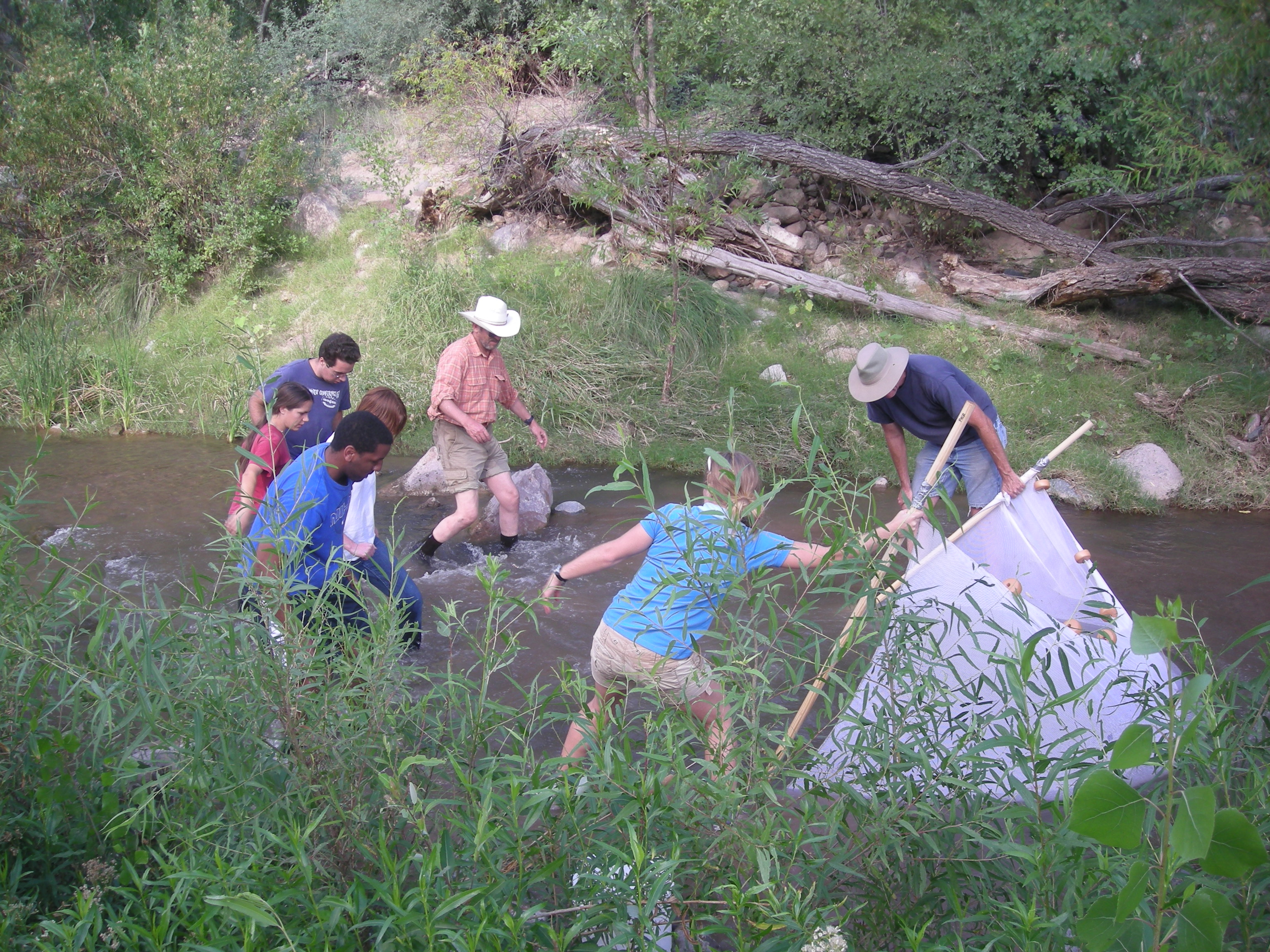
Seining for native fish

Twice a year, partners including The Nature Conservancy, the Bureau of Land Management, United States Fish and Wildlife Service, and Dr Peter Reinthal, professor at the University of Arizona, sample nine sites along the length of Aravaipa Canyon. Three of these sites are located at the west and east ends of the canyon respectively, and three are within the canyon itself. Various methods are used to survey the type and abundance of fish species present at each location. The most common of these is seining, a method that involves dragging a long net through the water and catching many fish at a time. This is best done by two individuals (one on either side of the net) who run downstream, scooping up the fish that are attempting to swim upstream against the current. Another form of seining involves the same two people on either side of the net, but this time they plant the edges of the net into the streambed. Then, another group of individuals form a line parallel to the net and kick up the water as they move toward the stationary net, driving fish into it. This approach works best on narrow side-channels that deviate from the wider stream's flow. Yet another, less-used method is known as electrofishing. This involves placing a set of electrodes in the water, which send out a low-level electric pulse, temporarily stunning the fish in the immediate area. This makes catching and identifying the fish somewhat easier than seining, but some may say it has ethical implications as it can occasionally cause death to some fish if not expertly done.

== See also ==
- Aravaipa Canyon Wilderness Area
