= Mexican stoneroller =

Conservation status
- Least Concern (IUCN 3.1)

- Vulnerable (NatureServe)

Scientific classification
- Kingdom: Animalia
- Phylum: Chordata
- Class: Actinopterygii
- Division: Teleostei
- Order: Cypriniformes
- Family: Leuciscidae
- Subfamily: Pogonichthyinae
- Genus: Campostoma
- Species: C. ornatum

Binomial name
- Campostoma ornatum Girard, 1856

Synonyms
- Campostoma pricei D. S. Jordan & Thoburn, 1896

Species of fish

The Mexican stoneroller (Campostoma ornatum) is a species of freshwater ray-finned fish in the family Leuciscidae, the shiners, daces and minnows.This fish is found in Arizona and Texas in the United States and parts of adjacent Mexico. The other species in this genus, Campostoma are morphologically similar.

== Description ==
The Mexican stoneroller has a very stout body with a very large head and snout. The mouth is unique in that its teeth have cartilaginous sheaths, while the size of its mouth is usually very small. The fish's mature length can range anywhere from 3 to nearly 6 inches, however 6 inches is rare, and the average is about 3.5 inches. They have small scales that run along the lateral line, much like the Gila longfin dace and the Yaqui longfin dace. The scales of the Mexican stoneroller can sometimes form arches on its back. Sexual selection has dictated exaggerated male characteristics, which include larger heads and pre-dorsal areas in more successful males. These fish have color patterns with lighter bottoms and darker backs, with a distinct black stripe along the lateral line. They also have a somewhat blotched appearance.

== Distribution ==
The Mexican stoneroller has been found as far south as the Rio Yaqui drainage in Mexico and tributaries of the Rio Grande near the Big Bend region of Texas. The habitat of the Mexican stoneroller ranges in elevation between 2600 and 6500 feet.

== Habitat ==
The Mexican stoneroller prefers shallow waters near gravel and stone substrates, and larger adults can be found in sandy-bottomed streams. They will use under-covered banks to protect themselves from predators and humans. The biotic community of the fish is primarily the Montane Conifer Forest in the Chiricahua Mountains. They are restricted to higher elevations because of their restricted diet of detritus and algae that thrive in colder waters. Aquatic insects are also part of the fish's diet, if these primary sources are not available due to droughts.

== Reproduction ==
Very few studies of the reproduction of this species have been conducted, leaving a limited amount of information about their patterns. This species is capable of changing the colors on its fins during breeding. The color changes are more dramatic in males, due to sexual selection and female mate choice. The winter and late spring months seem to be the primary times in which the bulk of spawning occurs. Mexican stonerollers use their tubercles as weapons during male-to-male competition, and also to stimulate and attract females. The name stoneroller was given to the genus because males excavate breeding areas by rolling stones with their heads to invite the females. This also helps males defend against their rivals.

== Biology and Conservation ==
The cartilaginous sheaths on their jaws are used for scraping algae and detritus along the gravel and stones within the habitat. An unusual amount of sexual selection has occurred in this species for unknown reasons, and large amounts of energy are expended in male competition and mating success because of this selection. This extra energy is perhaps wasted, and it could be contributing to the decline in fitness and ultimately the disappearance of the species. Populations are declining rapidly in Rucker Canyon along with San Bernardino Creek, however numbers in Texas and Mexico remain stable. The Arizona Game and Fish Department gave the species endangered status in 1988, and the Mexican stoneroller remains on the list. Aquifer pumping, reduction in stream flows, and predation from non-native green sunfish, are all major contributing factors to the decline of the species. The San Bernardino Ranch has current plans to reintroduce individuals in an attempt to recharge the population, and other projects involve federal habitat preservation.
