= San Bernardino National Wildlife Refuge =

Protected area in Cochise County, ArIzona

- IUCN category IV (habitat/species management area)
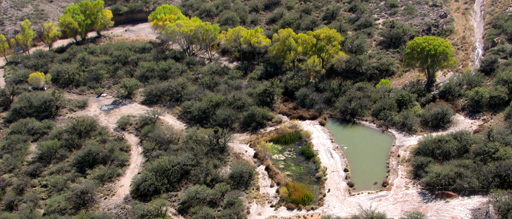

- Location within the United States
- Location: Cochise County, Arizona, United States
- Nearest city: Douglas, Arizona
- Coordinates: 31°20′52″N 109°15′37″W
- Area: 2,309 acres (9.34 km^{2})
- Established: 1982
- Governing body: U.S. Fish and Wildlife Service
- Website: San Bernardino National Wildlife Refuge

The San Bernardino National Wildlife Refuge is located on the U.S.-Mexico border in Cochise County, Arizona. Situated at 3,720 to 3,920 feet (1,130–1,190 m) elevation in the bottom of a wide valley, the refuge encompasses a portion of the headwaters of the Yaqui River, which drains primarily western Chihuahua and eastern Sonora, Mexico. The 2,309-acre (9.34 km^{2}) ranch was acquired by the U.S. Fish and Wildlife Service in 1982 to protect the water resources and provide habitat for endangered native fishes.

== Geography ==
This area is part of the basin and range geologic region, characterized by linear mountain ranges which are separated by broad, flat basins. The region was impacted by relatively recent volcanic activity, leaving volcanic plugs and cinder cones visible throughout the San Bernardino Valley (Arizona). Earthquakes have further altered the region and helped allow the flow of many springs and seeps. All of these dynamic geological events have played major roles in shaping the valley, catching and storing crucial water, and helping determine the variety of plants and animals present.

== History ==
The San Bernardino Valley once supported permanently flowing creeks, springs, and marshy wetlands. The giant sacaton grassland in the valley has been described as "a luxuriant meadow some eight or ten miles long and a mile wide". The dependable source of water and grass made the area not only invaluable to a huge diversity of fish and wildlife, but also a center of human activity for centuries.

With expanding settlement beginning in the late 19th century came farming, mining, and livestock production, all of which competed for the same water. While the extensive wetlands here once provided historic habitat for eight different kinds of native fish, the lowering water table led to severe changes in the habitat and the eventual local extinctions of many species. The San Bernardino National Wildlife Refuge was established in 1982 as part of a novel approach of rescuing these species; manmade artesian wells connected to the aquifer that could host the endangered fish being threatened by the draining of their habitats.

== Ecology ==
The refuge protects several endangered species of fish endemic to the Yaqui River's watershed that reach their northernmost limits at the refuge. As the Yaqui River primarily flows through Mexico, the refuge is also the only area in the United States where these fish are found. The fish include the Yaqui chub (Gila purpurea), beautiful shiner (Cyprinella formosa), Yaqui catfish (Ictalurus pricei), Yaqui topminnow (Poeciliopsis sonoriensis), Yaqui longfin dace (Agosia chrysogaster sp 1), and Mexican stoneroller (Campostoma ornatum). The former four species are considered federally endangered within the United States and are protected by the Endangered Species Act. Other rare, range-limited species known from the refuge include the Cochise pincushion cactus (Escobaria robbinsiorum) Huachuca water umbel (Lilaeopsis schaffneriana), San Bernardino springsnail (Pyrgulopsis bernandina), and Chiricahua leopard frog (Lithobates chiricahuensis).

== Threats ==
Construction of the Mexico–United States border wall cut through a migration corridor for the jaguar. It will likely stop the migration of jaguars and other animals between Mexico and the US. From late 2019 onwards, massive amounts of water have been pumped from the aquifer for the wall's construction, causing likely permanent damage to the natural water flow in the area. Declassified emails released in mid 2020, dating back to the beginning of the wall's construction in fall 2019, found that water extraction for the wall drained several of the refuge's crucial artesian wells, forcing evacuations of the endangered fish in them. Large-capacity water pumps had to be purchased and installed in order to mimic the natural pond outflow lost by the water extraction. Refuge manager Bill Radke has referred to the wall's construction as the “current greatest threat to endangered species in the southwest region”.

== See also ==
- Wildlife of the United States
