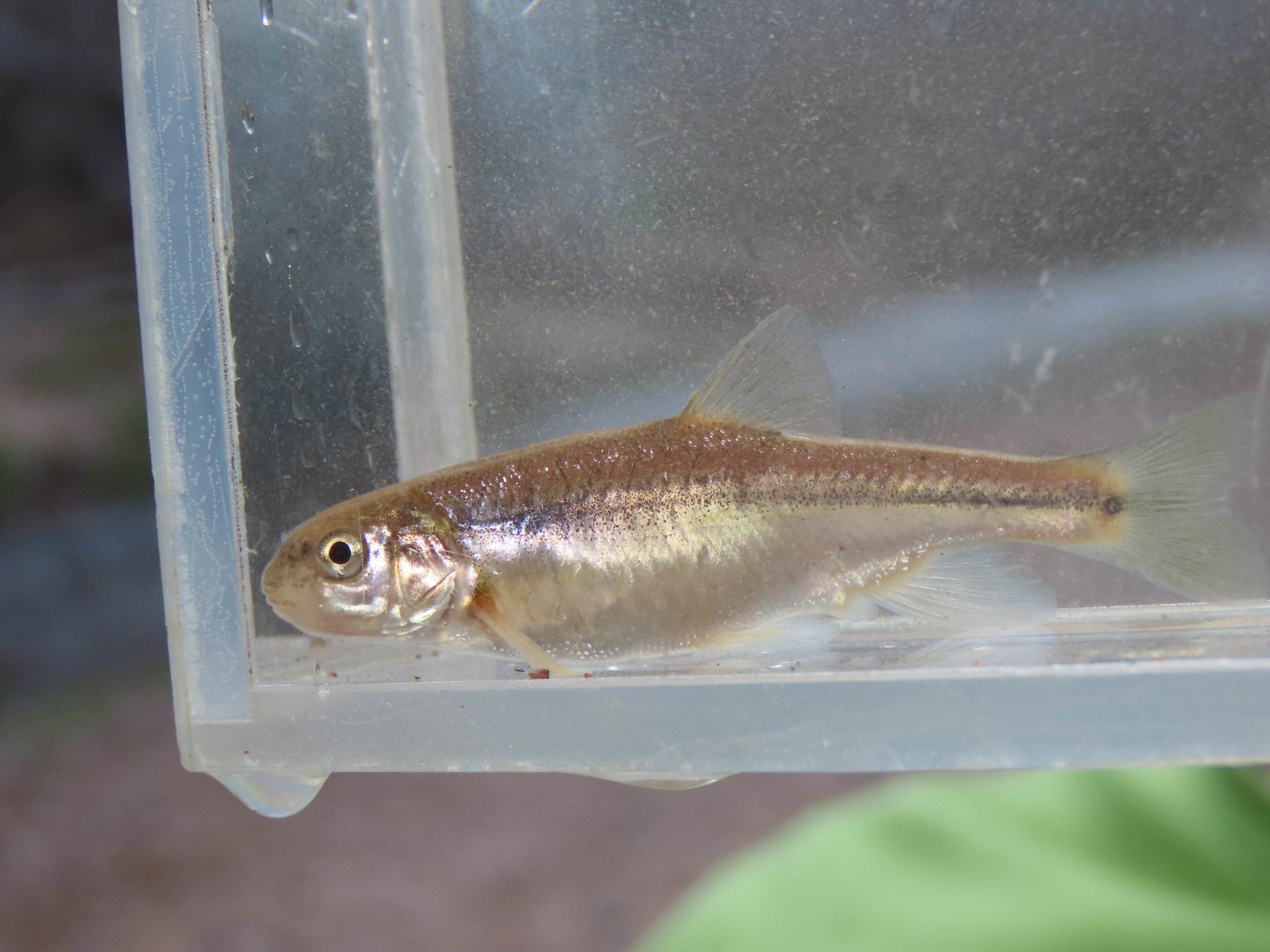

Conservation status
- Least Concern (IUCN 3.1)

- Apparently Secure (NatureServe)

Scientific classification
- Kingdom: Animalia
- Phylum: Chordata
- Class: Actinopterygii
- Order: Cypriniformes
- Family: Leuciscidae
- Subfamily: Pogonichthyinae
- Genus: Agosia; Girard, 1856
- Species: A. chrysogaster

Binomial name
- Agosia chrysogaster Girard, 1856

Synonyms
- Rhinichthys chrysogaster (Girard, 1856); Hyborhynchus siderius Cope, 1875; Agosia metallica Girard, 1856

= Longfin dace =

Species of fish

The longfin dace (Agosia chrysogaster) is a species of freshwater fish in the leuciscid family of order Cypriniformes. It is the only member of the monotypic genus Agosia and is found in southwestern North America. The Gila longfin dace is considered the nominate subspecies, and the Yaqui longfin dace is considered a form. The genus name Agosia is of Native American origin, and the species name chrysogaster is derived from Greek, where chrysós means "gold" and gastḗr means "belly".

== Description ==
Longfin dace have a bluntly shaped snout and head with a slightly subterminal mouth. The upper jaw contains a small barbel and tends to protrude above the lower jaw. The body is fusiform and covered with small scales. Longfin dace have 70–95 scales along their lateral line, seven to nine anal fin rays, and nine dorsal fin rays. An adult longfin dace has a maximum total length of 4 inches (100 mm), although it rarely reaches 3.2 inches (81 mm). Age estimation with scales and length-based grouping suggested that most longfin dace live less than two years.

== Distribution and habitat ==
Longfin dace are native to the deserts of southwestern North America, notably in the American states of Arizona and New Mexico and northern Mexico states of Sinaloa and Sonora. The longfin dace is tolerant to a wide range of water temperature, and is found in low elevation desert streams to mountain brooks. They prefer streams that have sandy or gravel bottoms, typically with overhanging banks or cover to use as protection. During periods of drought, longfin dace may seek refuge in algae and detritus mats.

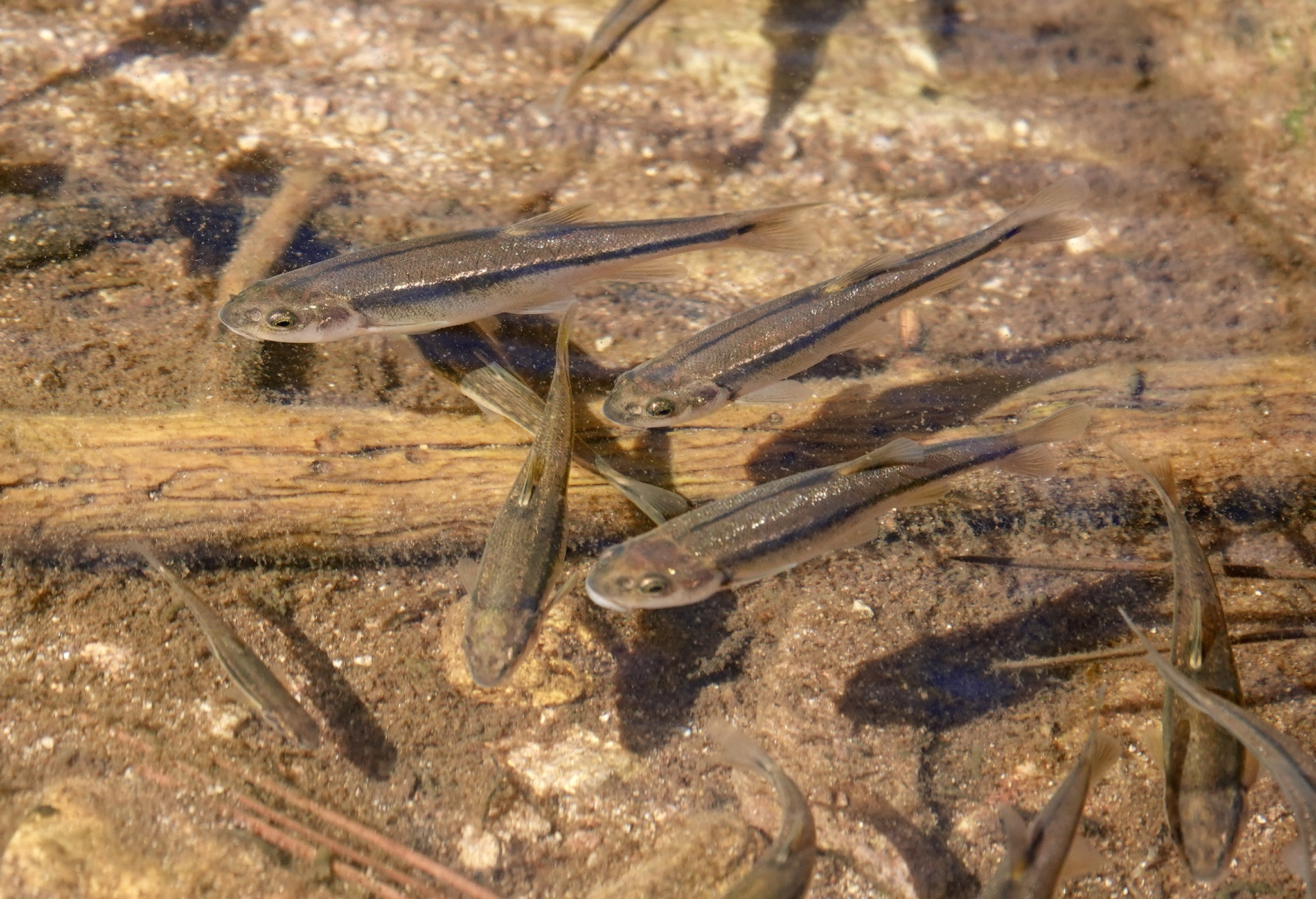
A school of longfin dace observed in Cochise County, Arizona.

== Diet ==
Longfin dace are omnivorous and opportunistic feeders. They can feed on invertebrates, zooplankton, algae, and detritus.

== Reproduction ==
Longfin dace reach sexual maturity within a year and are able to spawn throughout the year, although most spawning occurs in spring and late summer. Longfin dace will create depressions in the sand to deposit their eggs, which provide cover from predators while the eggs develop and hatch. The eggs and juveniles receive no parental care.

== Management ==
In the United States, longfin dace are considered secure but have been reduced in abundance due to habitat change and introduced fishes.
