= Swisshelm Mountains =

Mountain range in Cochise County, Arizona, United States

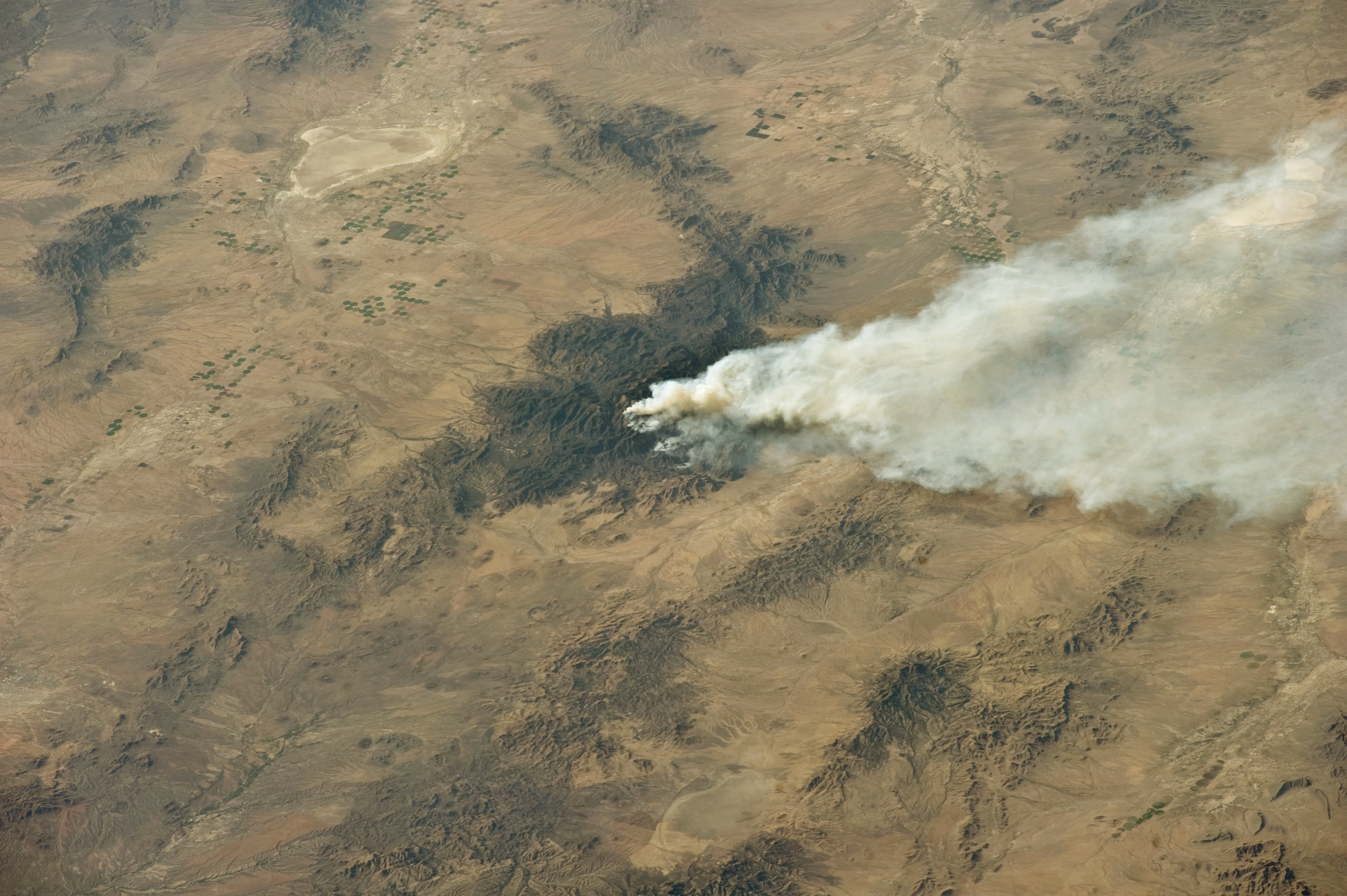
- Wildfire in the Swisshelm Mountains, just west of the south end of the Chiricahuas

Highest point
- Peak: Swisshelm Mountain
- Elevation: 7,185 ft (2,190 m)
- Coordinates: 31°40′28″N 109°32′07″W

Dimensions
- Length: 22 mi (35 km) N-S
- Width: 6 mi (9.7 km)

Geography
- Location within Arizona
- Country: United States
- State: Arizona
- Regions: Sonoran Desert, Rucker Canyon, Leslie Canyon Refuge and Madrean Sky Islands
- County: Cochise
- Communities: Elfrida, McNeal, Douglas and Agua Prieta, Sonora
- Range coordinates: 31°40′28″N 109°32′07″W
- Borders on: Sulphur Springs Valley, Chiricahua Mountains, Pedregosa Mountains-, Leslie Creek and Leslie Canyon National Wildlife Refuge

The Swisshelm Mountains are a small mountain range adjacent to the southwest corner of the Chiricahua Mountains of eastern Cochise County, Arizona. They are separated from the Pedrogosa Mountains to the southeast, the Chiricahuas to the northeast, and by Leslie Creek, bordering the south and east; the area is now notable for the Leslie Canyon National Wildlife Refuge.

The mountain range is named for John Swisshelm, a miner, a local settler of the late 1800s.

== Range ==
The range is a north-south range, with three notable peaks. In the south, Swisshelm Mountain is the highest at 7,185 feet (2,190 m). In the north, an unnamed peak is 5225 ft, and is adjacent to Whitewater Draw of the lower stretch of Rucker Creek. A second unnamed peak is in the northeast, at 5847 ft and also adjacent to Rucker Creek.

Leslie Creek forms the eastern and southern border of the Swisshelm Mountains. The Chiricahuas are directly adjacent eastwards; the Pedregosa Mountains are southeast and are drained by a tributary of Leslie Creek, Big Bend Creek.

The communities of Elfrida and McNeal are directly west of the Swisshelms in the Sulphur Springs Valley; Douglas and Agua Prieta, Sonora are due south at about 15 miles (24 km). The historical area of Sunizona, Arizona, is northwest-(Pearce, Arizona).

== See also ==
- Leslie Canyon National Wildlife Refuge
- List of Madrean Sky Island mountain ranges - Sonoran - Chihuahuan Deserts
