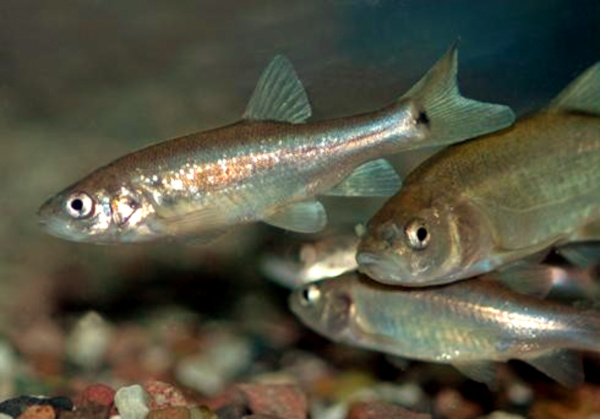

Conservation status
- Vulnerable (IUCN 3.1)

Scientific classification
- Kingdom: Animalia
- Phylum: Chordata
- Class: Actinopterygii
- Order: Cypriniformes
- Family: Leuciscidae
- Genus: Gila
- Species: G. purpurea

Binomial name
- Gila purpurea (Girard, 1856)

Synonyms
- Tigoma purpurea Girard, 1856

= Yaqui chub =

Species of fish

The Yaqui chub (Gila purpurea) is a species of freshwater ray-finned fish belonging to the family Leuciscidae, which includes the daces, chubs, Eurasian minnows, and related species. It is found in northern Mexico and the United States. The Yaqui chub is a medium-sized minnow fish that historically occurred in streams of Rios Matape, Sonora, and Yaqui systems of Sonora, Mexico. It is one of the five species of the genus Gila in Arizona. The Yaqui chub is closely related to G. ditaenia (of Sonora, Mexico) and G. orcutti (of the Los Angeles Plain in California), and shares several physical characteristics with G. orcutti (Arroyo chub), but proves different by having a black wedge near the base of the caudal fin.

== Description ==
The Yaqui chub has a short and rounded snout, which causes the mouth to be small and slightly subterminal. It has large eyes placed on a thick head, placed on a deep body. This is different from the posterior portion of the body, which is much thinner. The Yaqui chub has enlarged scales that are roughly imbricated. Coloration is usually dark overall, but sometimes has a lighter underside. The Yaqui chub's lateral bands are underdeveloped, making them quite difficult to observe. However, a vertically placed, triangle-shaped spot is usually present on the caudal fin.
Very few Yaqui chubs can grow to about 17.8 cm (7 in) long, while the average length of this fish is less than 13 cm (5.1 in) long. Juveniles are usually 40–50 mm (1.6–2 in).

== Range ==
Although the current distribution of the Yaqui chub in Mexico is unknown, some records show that this species has been introduced and established in Leslie Creek, in the Swisshelm Mountains of Arizona in 1969. This fish can also be found in the San Bernardino National Wildlife Refuge (SBNWR) and Leslie Canyon National Wildlife Refuges of Cochise County in Arizona. Specifically in the SBNWR, the current distribution of the Yaqui chub ranges from Leslie Creek to the House, Twin, North, and Mesquite Ponds, and the El Coronado Ranch (Turkey Creek). The Yaqui chub heavily relies on the artesian wells and springs of the SBNWR.

== Habitat ==
Yaqui chubs prefer living in deep pools of smaller streams with dense vegetation in the water, but some individuals inhabit cleaner, open areas near the gravel bottoms that are covered with large amounts of algae. Their habitat includes deep, vegetated pools of creeks and spring runs.

== Diet ==
When available, Yaqui chubs are known to eat aquatic insects and small fish, but they consume algae, terrestrial insects, and arachnids more often.

== Reproduction ==
Although Yaqui chubs breed sporadically in the summer, young usually spawn around March. Fish have a distinct coloration during the breeding season; males turn into a "steely-blue" color, while the females become a drearier, yellowish-brown color.

== Conservation ==
The U.S. population of the Yaqui chub is low but stable. Several threats are still present, though, including increased aquifer pumping, reduction of flows in streams, predation of nonnative fishes, overgrazing, and successive erosion. Protection of the San Bernardino aquifers and observation of nonnative fishes near the chub stream must be taken into account for this species to continue to exist. Some protective measures have been taken in an attempt for Yaqui chub conservation. In 1980, the Nature Conservancy purchased the San Bernardino Ranch, and eight years later, bought Leslie Canyon, both of which harbor strong Yaqui chub populations. These places bought by the conservancy were then sold to the U.S. Fish and Wildlife service to be established as national wildlife refuges. Soon after, a "Recovery Plan for the Endangered and Threatened fishes of the Rio Yaqui" was organized, but is still under review. The plan's main goal was to keep stable the habitats that the Yaqui chubs are currently occupying in Mexico and Arizona. The plan also involved conducting extensive research on the biology and habitat requirements for the Yaqui chub.
