= Aravaipa Canyon Wilderness =

Wilderness area located in the U.S. State of Arizona

- IUCN category Ib (wilderness area)
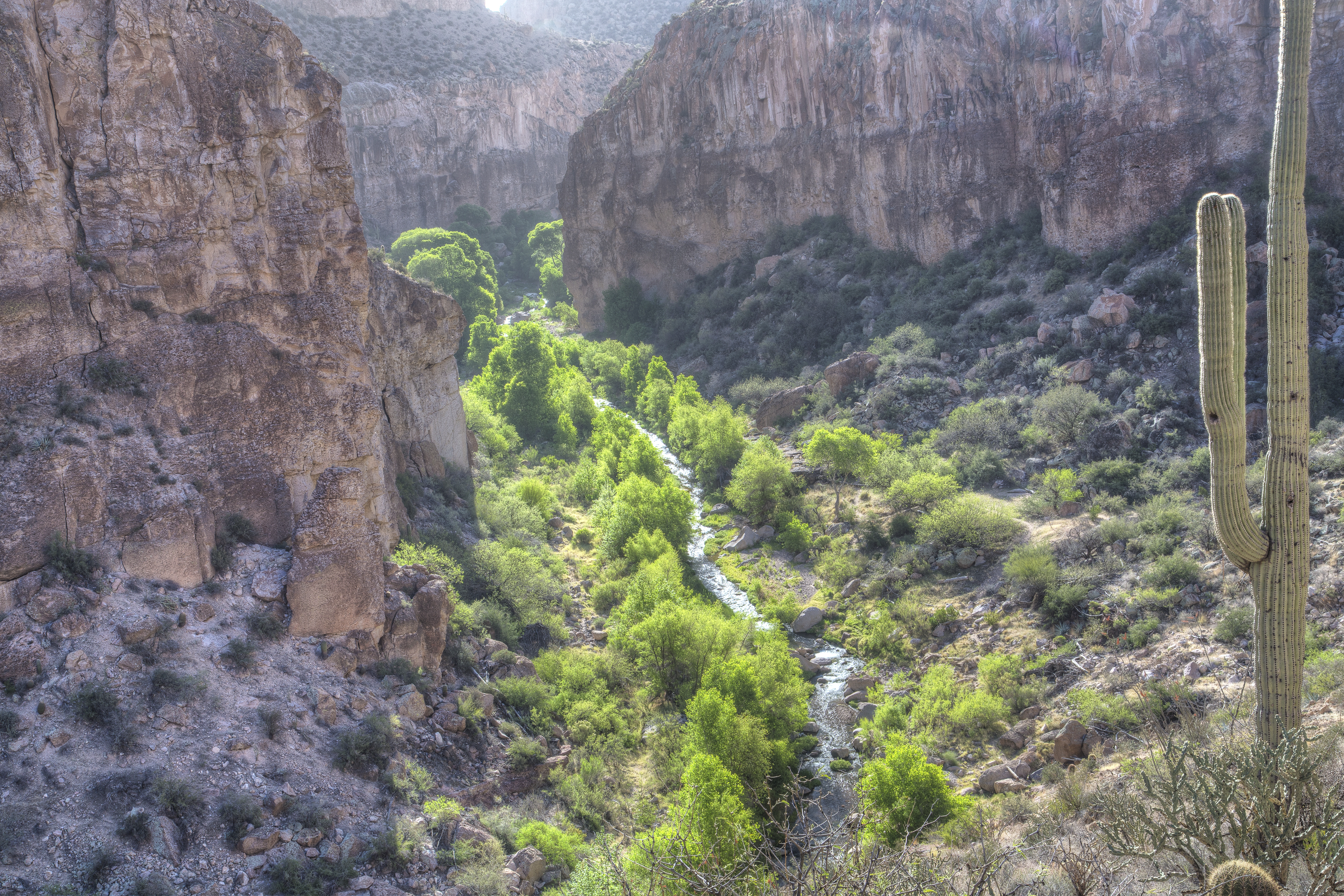

- Location within Arizona Location within the United States
- Location: Graham / Pinal counties, Arizona, U.S.
- Nearest city: Globe, Arizona
- Coordinates: 32.8970102°N 110.4875955°W
- Area: 19,700 acres (7,970 ha)
- Designated: 1984
- Governing body: Bureau of Land Management

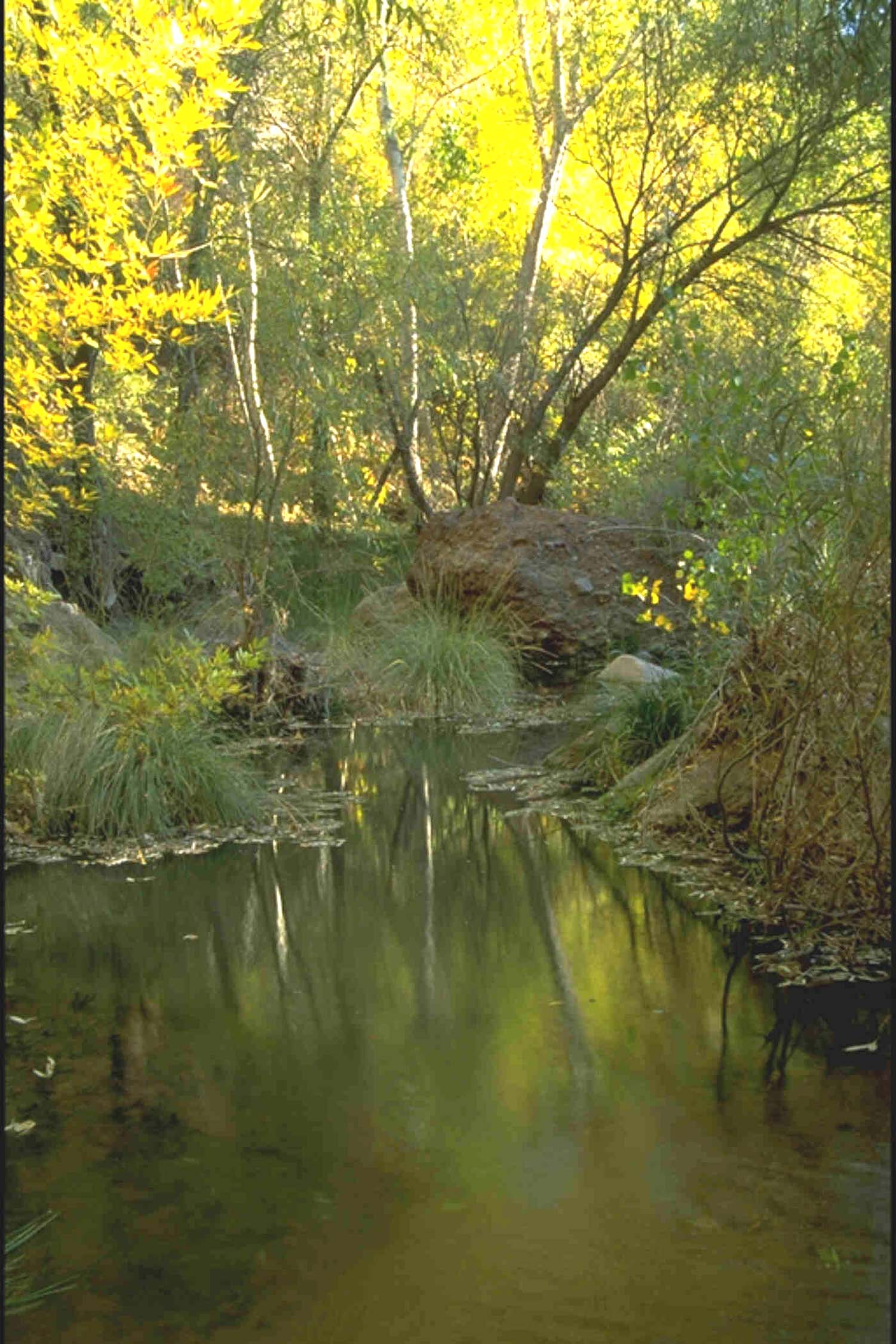
Fall colors near the western end of Aravaipa Canyon

Aravaipa Canyon Wilderness is a 19,410 acres (7,850 ha) wilderness area located in the southeast portion of the U.S. State of Arizona between Tucson and Phoenix. There are two entrances to the area: the East Trailhead from U.S. Highway 70 between Safford and Bylas and the West Trailhead from Arizona Route 77 between Mammoth and Winkelman. The Wilderness distinctively features the year-round flowing Aravaipa Creek that runs for 20 miles and supports a wide range of native desert wildlife.

== Toponym ==
The word Aravaipa is an Apache word for "laughing waters".

== Access ==
The wilderness is administered by the BLM and is located northeast of Mammoth, Arizona in Graham and Pinal counties, about 120 miles (190 km) southeast of Phoenix. Pedestrian access to the preserve is allowed only with prior authorization from preserve staff. The area is popular for its recreation, especially its hiking trails and off-roading. Visitors can hike to the abandoned cabin at the Parsons Grove site in the Aravaipa Canyon Preserve as of 2013. Hiking in the canyon often requires creek crossings across Aravaipa Creek.

== Geography ==
The Aravaipa Canyon Wilderness forms the northwest border of the Galiuro Mountain range. The wilderness includes the 11-mile (18 km) long Aravaipa Canyon, the surrounding tablelands and nine side canyons. The Nature Conservancy's Aravaipa Canyon Preserve protects 7,000 acres (28 km^{2}) of private land and is contiguous with the BLM wilderness area.

== Ecology ==
While the upper watershed of the wilderness is intermittent with water, Aravaipa Creek becomes perennial at Aravaipa Spring and westward. The creek hosts seven native desert fishes in Arizona as a tributary of the San Pedro River, including the threatened spikedace and loach minnow.

Wildlife is abundant throughout the canyon. It shelters over 200 species of birds, such as Bell's vireo and beardless tyrannulet, peregrine falcon, black and zone-tailed hawks, yellow-billed cuckoo, and Mexican spotted owl. Mountain lion, coatimundi, ringtailed cats, black bear, lowland leopard frog, desert bighorn sheep, and gila monster also inhabit the canyon rim and lowlands.

The low areas of the canyon contain sycamore, cottonwood, willow, walnut, ash, and white oak, while mesquite trees are found above the floodplain. At high elevations in the canyon, Sonoran desertscrub, semidesert grassland, oak and juniper create an evergreen woodland. Native wildflowers that can be found blooming in the spring include lupine, four o'clock, monkey flowers, and columbine.

== Permits and fees ==
A permit and fee are required to enter Aravaipa Canyon Wilderness. Use is limited to 50 people per day. Permits can be obtained from the BLM.

== See also ==
- Galiuro Wilderness
- List of Arizona Wilderness Areas
- Native Fishes of Aravaipa Canyon

== Sources and external links ==
- BLM Aravaipa Canyon Wilderness page
- Nature Conservancy Aravaipa Canyon Preserve
- Wilderness.net Aravaipa Canyon Wilderness page
