= Yaqui longfin dace =

Conservation status
- Critically Imperiled (NatureServe)

Scientific classification
- Kingdom: Animalia
- Phylum: Chordata
- Class: Actinopterygii
- Order: Cypriniformes
- Family: Leuciscidae
- Genus: Agosia
- Species: A. chrysogaster
- Subspecies: A. c. ssp. 1

Trinomial name
- Agosia chrysogaster ssp. 1

Subspecies of fish

The Yaqui longfin dace is a small fish of the American Southwest and northern Mexico, and considered a form of the longfin dace. It is often referred to as Agosia chrysogaster sp 1.

== Description ==
The Yaqui longfin dace is similar to the Gila longfin dace, but differs slightly in body shape and relative placement of fins, with this form being generally smaller, and less sexually dimorphic, and having longer pre- and postdorsal body lengths. Tuberculation also appears to differ between the two forms. Its silvery gray and olive color pattern is similar to the Gila longfin dace, however the Yaqui longfin dace can sometimes have golden speckles along its body. The lower abdomen can be white as well. The Gila and Yaqui longfin daces both have black spots on their caudal fins, and both are fusiform. They also have a triangular dorsal fin with the absence of a dark spot.

== Distribution ==
In Arizona, the Yaqui longfin dace only occurs in the southeast, in Cochise County (in both the endorheic Sulphur Springs (Willcox Playa) and Río Yaqui drainages). However, it is also found in northern Mexico, in the Yaqui, Sonora, Mayo, Fuerte and Sinaloa River Basins of Sonora and Sinaloa. The Yaqui longfin dace was re-introduced into the Yaqui River on the San Bernardino Wildlife Refuge and the Leslie Creek Wildlife Refuge including West Turkey Creek at Rucker Canyon. The Yaqui longfin dace has the same elevation restrictions as the Gila longfin dace, ranging only below 1,484 m (4,869 ft), with records of up to 2,030 m (6,660 ft). They are found in desert scrub to Madrean pine–oak woodlands.

== Habitat ==
The habitat of the Yaqui longfin dace is similar to that of the Gila longfin dace, and it ranges from low and hot desert streams to about 1,600 m (5,200 ft) elevation. They prefer brooks and streams that have sandy or gravely bottoms, typically with overhanging banks protecting them from predator or human observation. Their average water temperature preference is 23.9 °C (75 °F), with a water depth average of 0.18 m (7.1 in). During water shortages, they seek refuge in algae and detritus mats of wetland habitats.

== Reproduction ==
Yaqui longfin dace usually spawn in the spring from December to July, but extend the season into September in low desert habitats. They reach sexual maturity within their first year, and create depressions in the sand to hide their eggs. This helps them provide a safe place for development, allowing minimal disturbance from other species or predators. Studies have shown a positive correlation between fecundity and fish length, and the same correlation is suggested to exist between male length and mating success.

== Biology ==
Sediment discharge in river bottoms occurs during flooding seasons, and causes the dace to swim directly into the currents avoiding the spraying of sediment into the gills. If drought occurs, the fish also seek refuge in wetland areas such as algae mats. They prevent desiccation by hiding under logs and stones. The wetlands provide detritus, a nutrient that these fish primarily eat, as the fish are omnivorous and opportunistic feeders. They can also feed on invertebrates, zooplankton, and other forms of algae as circumstances allow. The lifespan of the Yaqui longfin dace is three years and they are very susceptible to predation, more so than the Gila longfin dace. Crayfish and other introduced species feed on the Yaqui longfin dace.
