= Outwelling =

Excess nutrients produced by salt marshes

Outwelling is a hypothesized process by which coastal salt marshes and mangroves, “hot spots” of production, produce an excess amount of carbon each year and “outwell” these organic nutrients and detritus into the surrounding coastal embayment or ocean, thus increasing the productivity of local fisheries or other coastal plants. Outwelling also nourishes plankton communities and causes a spike in activity. The majority of outwelling is dissolved organic carbon (DOC) and some particulate organic carbon (POC) Outwelling expels salt (90 g salt/m2), silicate (1.0 mmol/m2), orthophosphate (0.03 mmol/m2), and nitrate (0.04 mmol/m2) during each tidal cycle.

Outwelling is affected by a number of different factors. For one, the amount of outwelling is dependent upon the primary production of an estuary, thus, highly productive salt marshes result in increased outwelling. It is also dependent on tidal amplitude and geomorphology of the estuary. Outwelling is not a steady process, and is affected by large rainfalls or inundation events (the larger the inundation, the greater the outwelling). Outwelling occurs as pulses that correlate to inundation and precipitation events, productivity and tidal fluctuations. In some cases, it is macrofauna and algae that are pulsed out of the salt marsh into the water column rather than nutrients, but this has a similar effect of attracting small fish and nourishing the marine environment.

Outwelling does not occur in every estuary. It is more evident and occurs more in estuaries bordering extensive coastal marshes. For example, a study done in a New England salt marsh found no evidence of outwelling, and in fact found that the salt marshes import carbon; however, another study done in Louisiana near the extensive salt marshes where tidal amplitude is larger found that outwelling contributed a significant amount of organic carbon to the nearby waters.

== Ramifications ==
Because of this hypothesis, many states have passed laws protecting estuaries based on the rationale that protecting estuaries will protect the food source of local fish populations.

== Controversy ==
The Outwelling hypothesis has been hotly debated for decades. There are many studies examining this hypothesis, but there has not yet been a firm conclusion. It appears that it may occur in some estuaries at some times, but there is a body of evidence contesting the claimed amount of organic carbon export, and even whether marshes export carbon at all.
