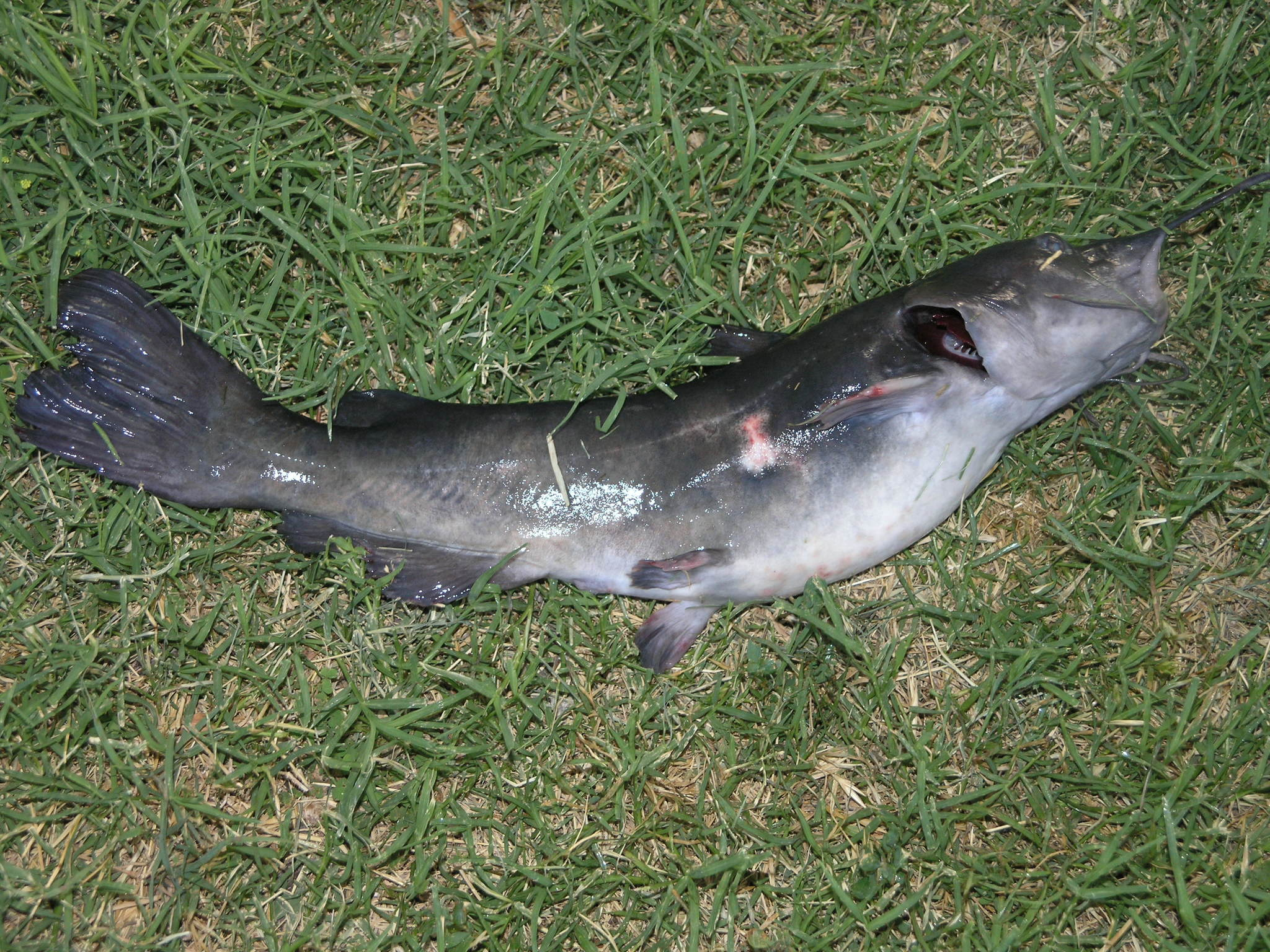
- Individual found dead near the San Bernardino National Wildlife Refuge

Conservation status
- Endangered (IUCN 3.1)

- Threatened (ESA)

Scientific classification
- Kingdom: Animalia
- Phylum: Chordata
- Class: Actinopterygii
- Order: Siluriformes
- Family: Ictaluridae
- Genus: Ictalurus
- Species: I. pricei

Binomial name
- Ictalurus pricei (Rutter, 1896)

Synonyms
- Villarius pricei Rutter, 1896

= Ictalurus pricei =

Species of fish

Ictalurus pricei, the Yaqui catfish, is a species of North American freshwater catfish native to Mexico and Arizona.

== Description ==
The coloration of the Yaqui catfish is dark gray to black dorsally, and white to grayish beneath. The barbels of the catfish are jet-black except on the chin, where they are gray to whitened. The Yaqui catfish body is usually profusely speckled. A reddish coloration on the catfish is prominent beneath the head, as well as on the fins and tail. The adult size is up to 57.0 centimetres (22.4 in). The spines on the pectoral and dorsal fins are shorter than those of a channel catfish (Ictalurus punctatus) of similar size.

== Etymology ==
I. pricei was named in honour of William W. Price.

== Range ==
The Yaqui catfish historically occurred in San Bernardino Creek as far up as San Bernardino Ranch, Arizona. An introduced population of catfish existed in the Monkey Springs Reservoir system near Patagonia, Arizona, from 1899 until the 1950s. The stock presumably came from the Rio Sonora basin of Sonora, Mexico, where the species still lives. A small population of 350 fish has been reintroduced into the Rio Yaqui on the northernmost portion of the San Bernardino National Wildlife Refuge in November 1997.

== Habitat ==
Yaqui catfish are found primarily in ponds or streams, primarily in larger rivers, but also in small streams, where they prefer quiet, clear pools. The catfish are most common in larger rivers in areas of medium to slow currents over sand/rock bottoms. Streams flow intermittently in the dry season, and the catfish seeks refuge in permanent, often spring fed pools.

== Population trends ==
Yaqui catfish survived in San Bernardino Creek until spring flows diminished because of groundwater pumping causing the creek to dry up. The remaining habitat at San Bernardino Creek was severely trampled by livestock, making it uninhabitable. The catfish were introduced in 1899 into the Santa Cruz River system (in a reservoir fed by Monkey Spring), where they persisted until the 1950s. A small population of 350 fish has been reintroduced into the Rio Yaqui on the northernmost portion of the San Bernardino National Wildlife Refuge in November 1997, but outside the San Bernardino refuge, they have become extinct from United States waters.

== Management factors ==
Activities known to be detrimental to the Yaqui catfish populations are the dewatering of habitats through stream usage and rerouting, stream impoundment, channelization, domestic livestock grazing, timber harvesting, mining, road construction, polluting, and stocking non-native species.

Threats: aquifer pumping, reduction in stream flows, water diversion, drought, hybridization, and competition and predation by non-native fishes

Management needs: protect San Bernardino aquifers, and Leslie Creek and Black Draw watersheds to ensure adequate perennial flow, ameliorate effects of non-native fishes, reintroduce into suitable habitats within historical range, stabilize and protect populations in Mexico
