= Leslie Canyon National Wildlife Refuge =

Protected area in Arizona, US

- IUCN category IV (habitat/species management area)
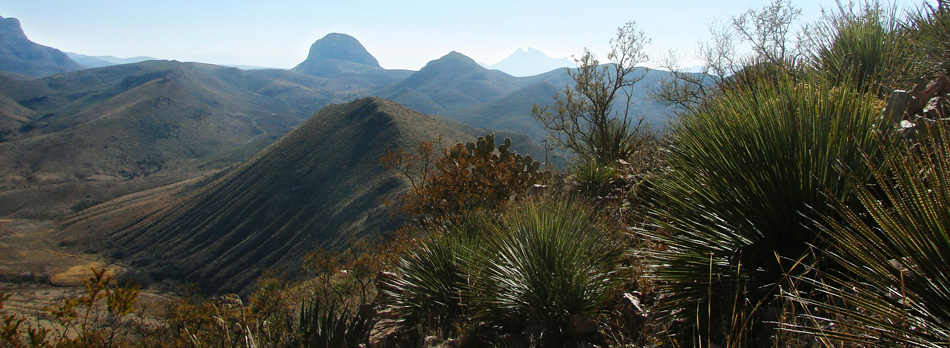

- Location within the United States
- Location: Cochise County, Arizona, United States
- Nearest city: Douglas, Arizona
- Coordinates: 31°35′19″N 109°30′42″W
- Area: 2,770 acres (11.2 km^{2})
- Established: 1988
- Governing body: U.S. Fish and Wildlife Service
- Website: Leslie Canyon National Wildlife Refuge

Leslie Canyon National Wildlife Refuge is a National Wildlife Refuge of the United States located in Arizona. The 2,770-acre (11.2 km^{2}) refuge was established in 1988 to protect habitat for the endangered Yaqui Chub (Gila purpurea) and Yaqui Topminnow (Poeciliopsis occidentalis sonorensis). The refuge also protects a rare velvet ash-cottonwood-black walnut gallery forest.

This area is part of the basin and range geologic region, characterized by linear mountain ranges which are separated by broad, flat basins. The region was impacted by relatively recent volcanic activity, leaving volcanic plugs and cinder cones visible throughout the San Bernardino Valley. Earthquakes have further altered the region and helped allow the flow of many springs and seeps. All of these dynamic geological events have played major roles in shaping the valley, catching and storing crucial water, helping determine the variety of plants and animals present.

The San Bernardino Valley once supported permanently flowing creeks, springs, and marshy wetlands. In addition, the giant sacaton grassland in the valley was once described as "a luxuriant meadow some eight or ten miles long and a mile wide". The dependable source of water and grass made the area not only invaluable to a huge diversity of fish and wildlife, but also a center of human activity for centuries.

With expanding settlement beginning in the late 19th century came farming, mining, and livestock production, all of which competed for the same precious water. While the extensive wetlands here once provided historic habitat for eight different kinds of native fish, the lowering water table led to severe changes in the habitat and the eventual local extinctions of many species.

In 1970, it was announced that a dam would be built in Leslie Canyon for the purpose for creating a lake for boating and fishing. The proposed lake was met with years long legal battles as Ralph Cowan and James Coryell, ranchers down stream of the canyon, argued the lake would negatively affect water users for the purpose of farming and ranching. In 1977, Arizona Game and Fish Department released a report that creation of the lake would negatively affect deer, bird, and native fish populations as well as stimulate the subdividing of private land, this effectively ended any effort to construct the lake.
