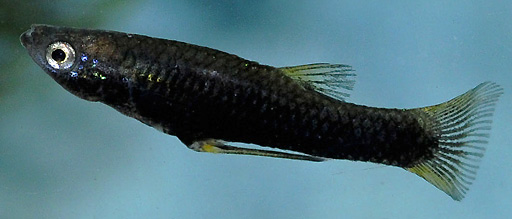
- male

Conservation status
- Data Deficient (IUCN 3.1)

- Vulnerable (NatureServe)

Scientific classification
- Kingdom: Animalia
- Phylum: Chordata
- Class: Actinopterygii
- Order: Cyprinodontiformes
- Family: Poeciliidae
- Genus: Poeciliopsis
- Species: P. sonoriensis

Binomial name
- Poeciliopsis sonoriensis (Girard, 1859)

= Poeciliopsis sonoriensis =

Species of fish

The Yaqui topminnow is a species of fish in the family Poeciliidae. Its scientific name is Poeciliopsis sonoriensis; it is also sometimes considered a subspecies of Poeciliopsis occidentalis as P. o. sonoriensis. This fish is native of Mexico and the United States, with a few native and introduced populations persisting in Arizona in the United States and a number of populations in northern Sonora, Mexico.

== Description ==
The Yaqui topminnow has an elongated, slightly curved body with a rounded to squared tail fin. The female is generally 3 to 4.5 centimeters (1.2 to 1.8 in) long, but may be longer. The male is smaller, generally under 2.5 cm (0.98 in) long. The anal fin of the male is elongated into a copulatory organ used to inseminate the female. Along with other species of topminnow, the Yaqui topminnow exhibits several somewhat unique reproductive characteristics among fish. The eggs are fertilized internally, the female can store sperm from several males in a special structure called the spermatheca, and she can fertilize eggs for a prolonged period after receiving the sperm; the female can simultaneously carry a number of different broods at different stages of development and bears live young rather than lays eggs.

During the breeding season, males may become jet black and exhibit aggressive breeding behavior, while other males may maintain the nonbreeding coloration and attempt to mate inconspicuously with females. The female is tan or olivaceous, with a pale belly and dark lateral band.

The species is closely related to the Gila topminnow (Poeciliopsis occidentalis) and is sometimes treated as a subspecies. The Yaqui topminnow can be distinguished by its superior mouth, longer snout, and the pattern of lateral banding on the body of the female, which rarely extends anterior to the bases of the pelvic fins.

== Biology ==
This fish lives in shallow, warm, slow-moving waters containing thick algae and debris. It is most common in marshes, especially those fed by springs. It feeds on detritus and small bits of animal and plant material.

The female bears 20 or more young per brood, and may produce a brood about every 20 days. The species breeds year-round in many areas, but in habitats with fluctuating temperatures, breeding occurs during the warmer months. The fish rarely lives more than one year.

== Conservation ==
The fish has a limited range. It was formerly considered to be a vulnerable species on the IUCN Red List. It faces the loss of its aquatic habitat types and competition with the western mosquitofish (Gambusia affinis).

Much of its United States population occurs on the San Bernardino National Wildlife Refuge, where it is protected.
