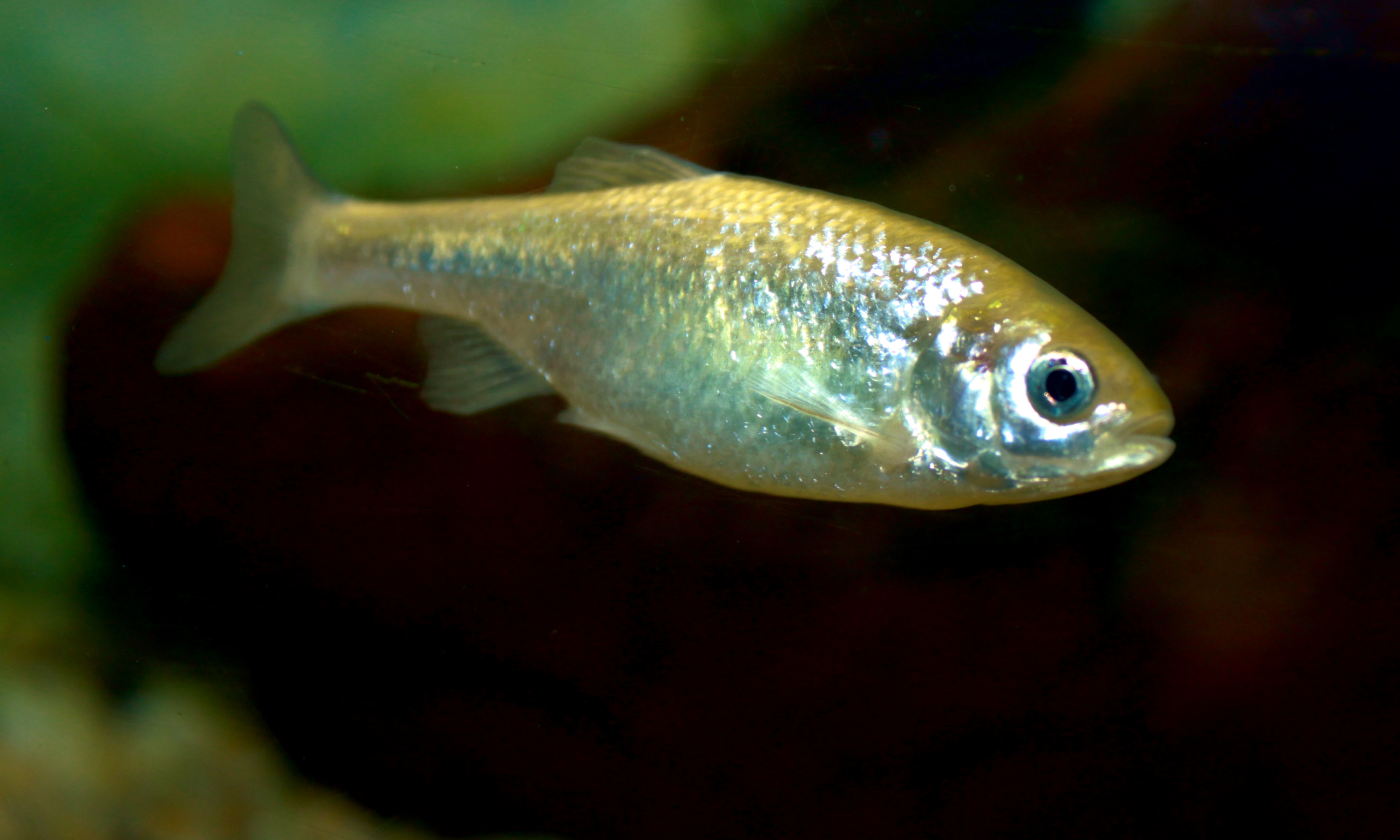
- juvenile

Conservation status
- Least Concern (IUCN 3.1)

Scientific classification
- Kingdom: Animalia
- Phylum: Chordata
- Class: Actinopterygii
- Order: Cypriniformes
- Family: Leuciscidae
- Genus: Cyprinella
- Species: C. formosa

Binomial name
- Cyprinella formosa (Girard, 1856)

Synonyms
- Moniana formosa Girard, 1856; Notropis formosus (Girard, 1856); Notropis santamariae Evermann & Goldsborough, 1902; Cyprinella santamariae (Evermann & Goldsborough, 1902); Notropis mearnsi Snyder, 1915

= Beautiful shiner =

Species of fish

The beautiful shiner (Cyprinella formosa) is a species of freshwater ray-finned fish in the family Leuciscidae, the shiners, daces and minnows. It is found in Mexico and Arizona and New Mexico in the United States. It is one of 22 species of Cyprinella found in North America.

== Description ==
The beautiful shiner is one of the smaller species of Arizona native fish, reaching lengths of only 3.5 inches. They have pointed snouts with compressed heads and bodies, giving them a very slender appearance. Their lateral lines are slightly curved with 30 to 40 small scales. Shiners also have a lower number of fin rays, which can distinguish them from longfin daces or suckers. The dorsal and pelvic fins have only eight fin rays, with anal fin rays ranging from eight to 9. Shiners have pharyngeal teeth than line up in single lines inside their mouths, which also make them easily distinguishable. Coloration patterns include either orange or bright red bodies, with silvery gray lateral lines along their scales. Melanophores line the dorsal portions, giving them the opportunity to change colors while mating. During mating, the males will turn their caudal fins yellow or orange, for certain unknown sexually selective reasons. Males can sometimes have either bluish or red heads.

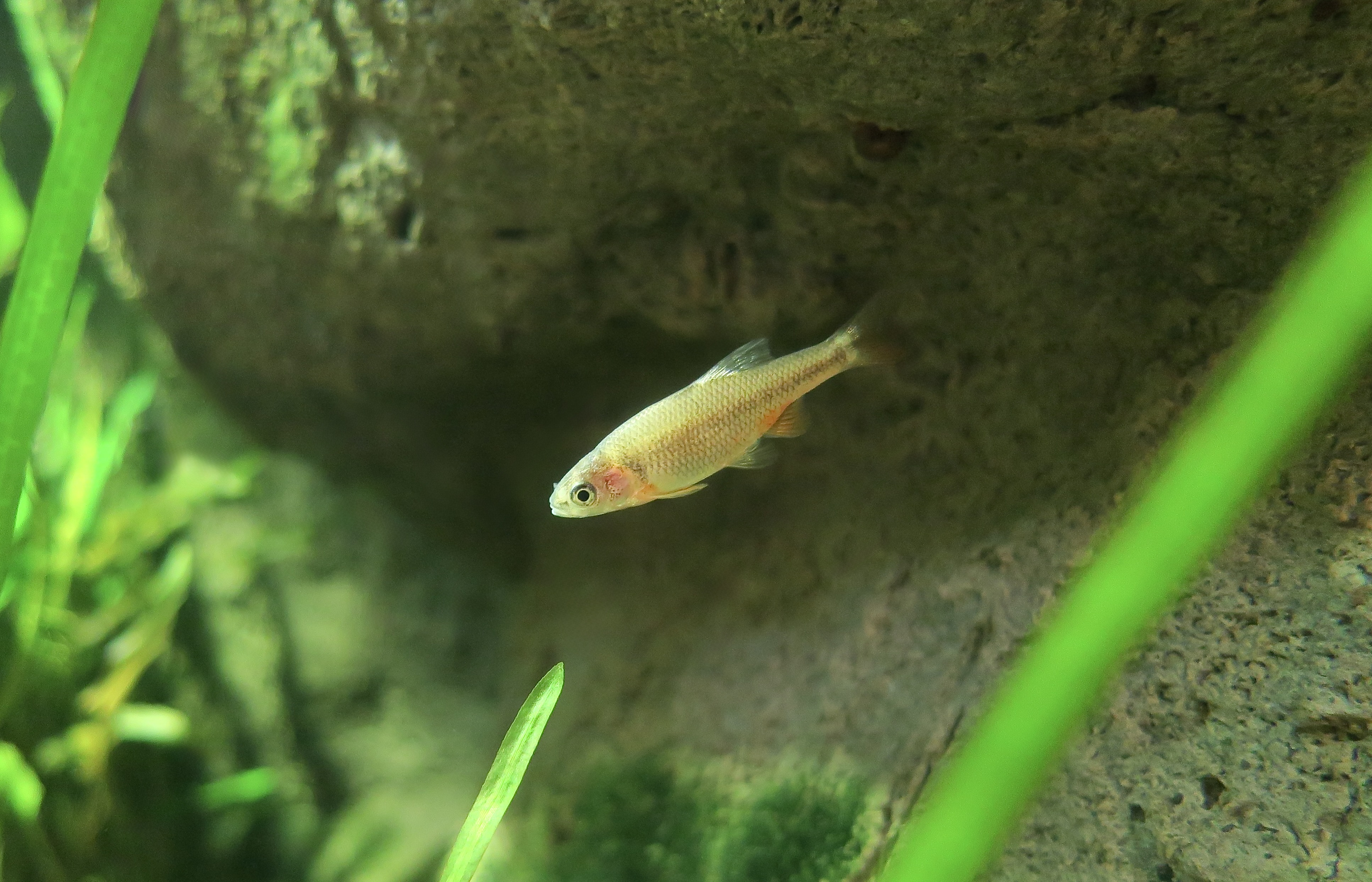
At Arizona-Sonora Desert Museum.

== Distribution in Arizona ==
These shiners are typically found in the waters of Cochise County and San Bernardino Creek. They were extirpated from the United States for a brief period during 1969-70, but they have recently been reintroduced to Arizona and other regions of the Southwest. The San Bernardino Wildlife Refuge has been working for the recovery of this threatened species by reintroducing it into various ponds around Cochise County. After the reintroduction in 1990, the beautiful shiner has made its way from Cochise County to Southern parts of Sonora and Mexico, traveling to the Santa Maria and Santa Clara drainages to spawn. This species can also be found Rio Yaqui and Mimbres Rivers. They have a stricter range in elevation, being found only in rivers between 2600 and 5600 feet, and they are restricted to Riparian biotic communities.

== Habitat ==
Their more preferred habitats are sandy, rocky-bottomed streams of smaller sizes. Attempts have been made to reintroduce the species into man-made ponds; some successful recoveries of populations have been noted and some unsuccessful. The largest populations have been found in smaller riffles in the Yaqui River, as well as smaller tributaries within Cochise County. Smaller eddies and riffles are preferred, because of the greater number of aquatic and terrestrial invertebrates can be found for feeding. Although this species eats primarily invertebrates, it is considered omnivorous, as it also feeds on detritus.

== Reproduction ==
The knowledge about the reproduction patterns of this species is limited. Federal law protects members of the endangered or threatened species, making it difficult to legally catch or study them. They will spread their eggs over aquatic vegetation or brush in attempt to hide them from predators. They also prefer warmer waters during copulation, mating only between the months of May and July.

== Conservation biology ==
Beautiful shiners live in highly volatile environments. Their predators include garter snakes, bullfrogs, and other non-native fish, resulting in extra energy spent hiding their eggs during spawning. The introduction of non-native green sunfish and bullfrogs has contributed largely to a decline in fitness, because these other animals are outcompeting this species for habitat. Arizona placed the beautiful shiner on the endangered species list in 1988, and little has been done to recover their numbers. Aquifer pumping, reduction in stream flows, and predation by non-native green sunfish, are all major contributing factors to the decline of the species according to Nature Serve (2002). The San Bernardino Ranch has current plans to populate the area, and other projects involve federal habitat preservation. The Dexter National Fish Hatchery & Technology Center has had the most success, because they have developed an effective method for reintroducing the species, and providing the criteria for spawning.
