= Gila longfin dace =

Conservation status
- Vulnerable (NatureServe)

Scientific classification
- Domain: Eukaryota
- Kingdom: Animalia
- Phylum: Chordata
- Class: Actinopterygii
- Order: Cypriniformes
- Family: Leuciscidae
- Genus: Agosia
- Species: A. chrysogaster
- Subspecies: A. c. chrysogaster

Trinomial name
- Agosia chrysogaster chrysogaster (Girard, 1856)

Subspecies of fish

The Gila longfin dace (Agosia chrysogaster chrysogaster) is a subspecies of the longfin dace found in Arizona. It is considered the nominate subspecies of the longfin dace.

== Description ==
The only other form of fish closely related to Gila longfin dace is the Yaqui longfin dace, which also occurs in Arizona. The body is fusiform, meaning that it is spindle-shaped (wide in the middle and tapers at both ends). The scales are small. A typical Gila dace has an average length of 3.5 inches (89 mm). Their mouths are small and oblique, with a bluntly shaped snout and head. The nares or outer nostrils of the fish direct water toward the gills and define the termination of the mouth. The Gila dace is easily distinguishable from other minnows by the lack of dark spots normally located on the triangular dorsal fin. However, a large black spot is at the base of the caudal fin. This fish is typically silvery gray dorsally and olive ventrally, with the absence of gold speckles found on its relative, the Yaqui longfin dace.

== Habitat ==
The Gila longfin dace has a wide range of water temperature preferences compared to other fish, being found from hot desert streams to mountain brooks with extremely cold water. They also prefer brooks and streams that have sandy or gravely bottoms, typically with overhanging banks to protect them from being spotted by predators and humans. The fish prefers relatively warmer water, with an average temperature preference of 23.9 °C (75 °F). They also prefer water depths averaging 0.18 m (7.1 in). During water shortages, they seek refuge in algae and detritus mats of wetland habitats.

The Gila longfin dace was originally introduced into the Virgin River Basin, the Zuñi, and the Mimbres Rivers. This represents the bulk of the range and overall distribution of the fish, with increasing populations around mountainous areas of the Mogollon Rim. This drastic, rapid increase in range is due to vast climate changes within its range. They are generally found at elevations less than 4,900 feet (1,500 m), with some scattered outlying records of species above 2,030 meters (6,660 ft).

== Biology ==
Sediment discharge in river bottoms occurs during flooding seasons, and will cause the Gila dace to swim directly into the currents avoiding the spraying of sediment into the gills. If droughts occur, the fish also seek refuge in wetland areas such as algae mats. They can survive desiccation by hiding under logs and stones. The wetlands provide detritus, a nutrient that these fish primarily eat, as the fish are omnivorous and are opportunistic feeders. They can also feed on invertebrates, zooplankton, and other forms of algae when the circumstances allow.

Gila longfin daces usually spawn during the months of September to December, and can extend this into January in desert habitats. They reach sexual maturity within the first year of birth, and will create depressions in the sand to hide their eggs. This helps them provide a safe place for development, allowing minimal disturbance from other species or predators. Studies have shown a positive correlation between fecundity and fish length, and it is suggested that the same correlation exists between male body length and mating success.
