= List of fish of Arizona =

Overview of fish native to and introduced in Arizona

Arizona has a diversity of freshwater fish found in its waters. the following is a list of species, both native and introduced

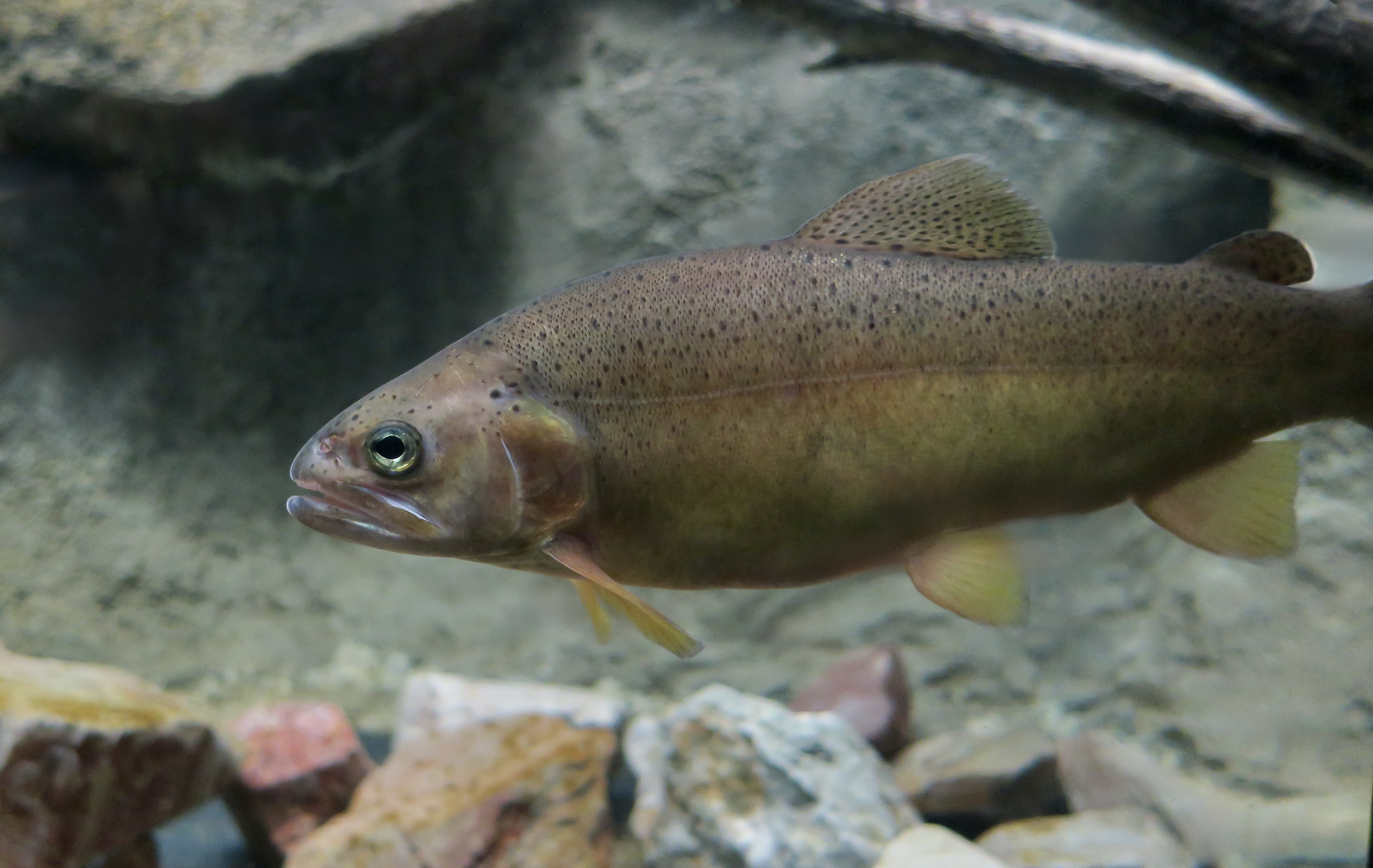
the Gila trout is Arizona's state fish

== Native Species ==
=== Class Actinopterygii (Ray-Finned Fishes) ===
==== Family Salmonidae (Salmon and Trouts) ====
- Genus Oncorhynchus (Pacific Salmons and western trout)
- Oncorhynchus apache (Apache Trout) — The state fish of Arizona; federally threatened
- Oncorhynchus gilae (Gila Trout) — Native to the Gila River basin; federally threatened

==== Family Catostomidae (Suckers) ====
- Genus Catostomus
  - Catostomus clarkii (Desert Sucker)
  - Catostomus discobolus (Bluehead Sucker)
  - Catostomus insignis (Sonora Sucker)
- Genus Xyrauchen
  - Xyrauchen texanus (Razorback Sucker) — Federally endangered

==== Family Cyprinidae (Carps and Minnows) ====
- Genus Agosia
  - Agosia chrysogaster (Longfin Dace)
- Genus Gila (southwestern chubs)
  - Gila ditaenia (Sonora Chub)
  - Gila elegans (Bonytail Chub) — Federally endangered
  - Gila intermedia (Gila Chub) — Federally endangered
  - Gila nigra (Headwater Chub)
  - Gila purpurea (Yaqui Chub) — Federally endangered
  - Gila robusta (Roundtail Chub)
- Genus Ptychocheilus
  - Ptychocheilus lucius (Colorado Pikeminnow) — Federally endangered
- Genus Rhinichthys
  - Rhinichthys osculus (Speckled Dace)
- Genus Tiaroga
  - Tiaroga cobitis (Loach Minnow) — Federally threatened

==== Family Cottidae (Sculpins) ====
- Genus Cottus
  - Cottus aleuticus (Coastrange Sculpin)
  - Cottus beldingii (Paiute Sculpin)

==== Family Cyprinodontidae (Pupfishes) ====
- Genus Cyprinodon
  - Cyprinodon macularius (Desert Pupfish) — Federally endangered

==== Family Poeciliidae (Livebearers) ====
- Genus Poeciliopsis
  - Poeciliopsis occidentalis (Gila Topminnow) — Federally endangered

== Introduced Species ==
The following is a list of notable fish species that have been introduced to Arizona and have established self-sustaining populations.

=== Family Centrarchidae (Sunfishes) ===
- Genus Lepomis (Sunfish)
  - Lepomis cyanellus (Green Sunfish)
  - Lepomis macrochirus (Bluegill)
  - Lepomis microlophus (Redear Sunfish)
- Genus Micropterus (Black basses)
  - Micropterus dolomieu (Smallmouth Bass)
  - Micropterus salmoides (Largemouth Bass)
- Genus Pomoxis (crappie)
  - Pomoxis annularis (White Crappie)
  - Pomoxis nigromaculatus (Black Crappie)

=== Family Cyprinidae (Carps and Minnows) ===
- Genus Cyprinus (true carps)
  - Cyprinus carpio (Common Carp)
- Genus Pimephales
  - Pimephales promelas (Fathead Minnow)

=== Family Ictaluridae (North American Catfishes) ===
- Genus Ameiurus (Bullheads)
  - Ameiurus melas (Black Bullhead)
  - Ameiurus natalis (Yellow Bullhead)
- Genus Ictalurus
  - Ictalurus punctatus (Channel Catfish)

=== Family Salmonidae (Salmon and Trouts) ===
- Genus Oncorhynchus (Pacific salmon and western trouts)
  - Oncorhynchus mykiss (Rainbow Trout) — Widely stocked
  - Oncorhynchus nerka (kokanee)
  - Oncorhynchus aguabonita (Golden Trout) — Occasionally stocked in high-elevation lakes
  - Genus Salvelinus (Eastern trouts and chars)
  - Salvelinus fontinalis (Brook Trout) — Introduced; common in some White Mountain streams
  - Salvelinus namaycush (Lake Trout) — Introduced in some deep, cold reservoirs

=== Family Cichlidae (Cichlids) ===
- Genus Oreochromis
  - Oreochromis aureus (Blue Tilapia) — Invasive in lower Colorado River

=== Family Poeciliidae (Livebearers) ===
- Genus Gambusia
  - Gambusia affinis (Mosquitofish)
