= List of dam removals in Arizona =

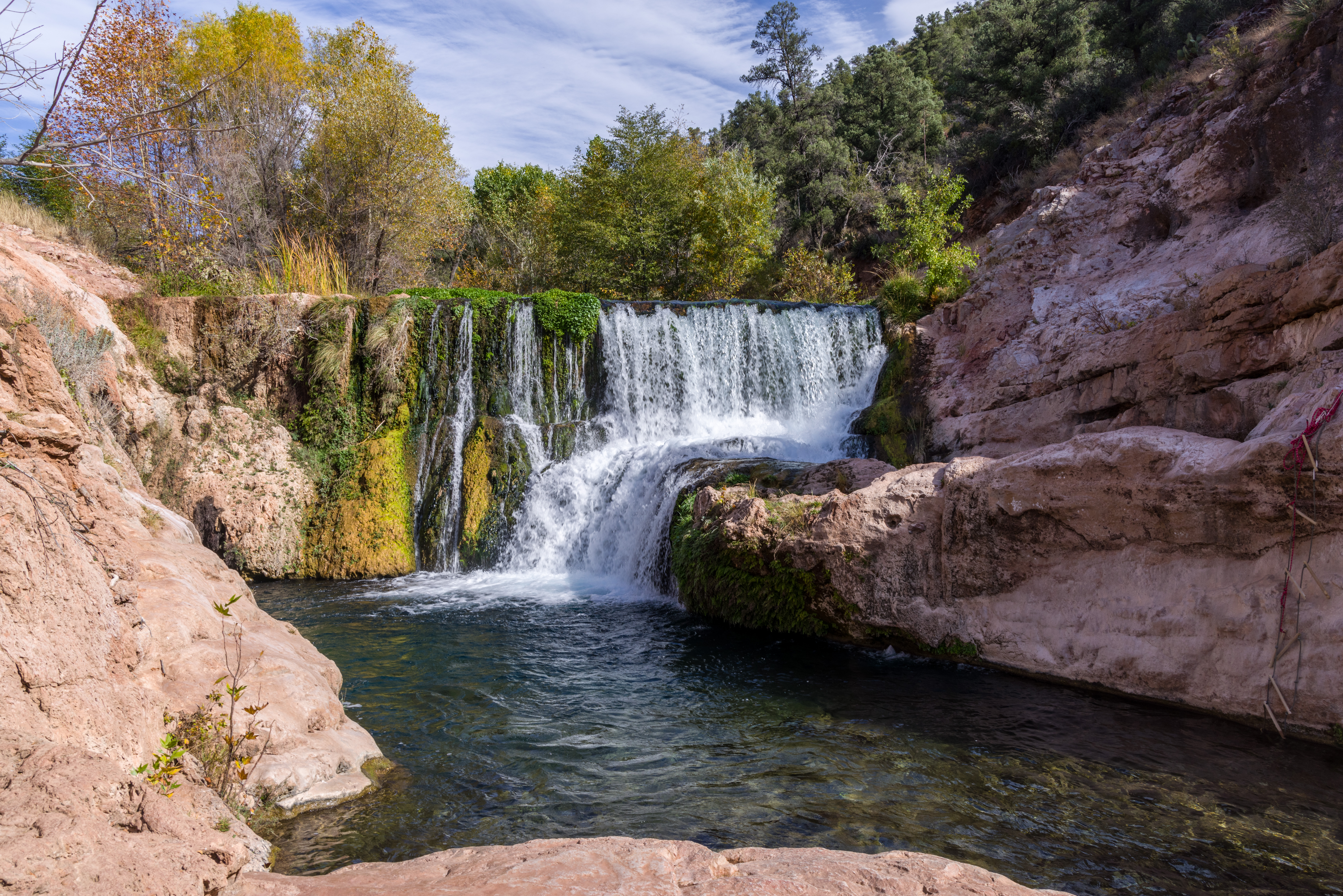
Fossil Creek Diversion Dam, partially removed in 2008

This is a list of dams in Arizona that have been removed as physical impediments to free-flowing rivers or streams.

== Removals by watershed ==
=== Verde River ===
Fossil Creek, a perennial desert tributary of the Verde River, had been diverted to power the Childs-Irving Hydroelectric Facilities since 1909. In 2005 the power plants were decommissioned and the full flow of water was returned to the stream, marking the first time a desert stream in the Southwestern United States was restored to its natural flow. In 2008, the top 6 ft (1.8 m) of the dam were removed, with the remainder left in place to reduce cost and to block upstream passage of invasive fish species. This was just the second time a US dam was decommissioned for environmental reasons alone, following the 1999 removal of the Edwards Dam in Maine. Unlike with Edwards Dam, the removal of the Fossil Creek Diversion Dam supported fish with little to no commercial or recreational value.

== Completed removals ==
| Dam | Height | Year removed | Location | Watercourse | Watershed |
|---|---|---|---|---|---|
| Concrete Dam | 39 ft (12 m) | 1982 | | | |
| Bright Angel Creek Fish Weir | | 2022 | Coconino County; 36.0998°N 112.0946°W | Bright Angel Creek | Colorado River |
| Golder Dam | 130 ft (40 m) | 1980 | Pinal County; 32.5425°N 110.8497°W | Cañada del Oro | Santa Cruz River |
| Fossil Creek Diversion Dam (Note: Only the top 6 ft (1.8 m) of the dam were removed. The rest was left in place as a barrier to invasive fish.) | 25 ft (7.6 m) | 2008 | Gila County and Yavapai County; 34.4213°N 111.576°W | Fossil Creek | Verde River |
