= Childs-Irving Hydroelectric Facilities =

- U.S. National Register of Historic Places
- U.S. Historic district
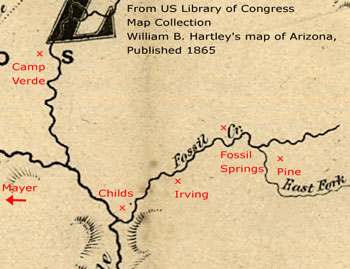
- A map showing the locations of Fossil Creek and the Childs-Irving power plants

- Location within Arizona Location within the United States
- Location: Yavapai and Gila counties, Arizona, United States
- Nearest city: Camp Verde, Arizona
- Coordinates: Fossil Creek Dam: 34°25′16″N 111°34′33″W Childs Power Plant: 34°20′57″N 111°41′53″W
- Built: 1909
- NRHP reference No.: 91001023
- Added to NRHP: August 9, 1991

Childs-Irving Hydroelectric Facilities consisted of two 20th-century power plants, a dam, and related infrastructure along or near Fossil Creek in the U.S. state of Arizona. The complex was named an Historic Mechanical Engineering Landmark in 1971 and was added to the National Register of Historic Places 20 years later. Decommissioned in 2005, the plants no longer produce electricity, and much of the infrastructure—including the dam, the Irving Power Plant, and thousands of feet of concrete flumes—have been removed, and the creek's original flow has been restored.

== History ==
The water rights of Fossil Creek, which flows from the Mogollon Rim near Strawberry, Arizona, to the Verde River downstream of Camp Verde, were purchased in 1900 by rancher Lew Turner. His goal was to generate hydroelectric power for sale to mining communities in the Bradshaw Mountains and Black Hills in Yavapai County, such as the copper mines at Jerome.

Arizona Power Company—later a part of the Arizona Public Service Company (APS)—began construction of the Childs Power Plant in 1908. Because the land around Fossil Creek consists mainly of mountainous terrain and canyons, and the nearest railroad station was in Mayer, more than 400 mules and 600 men were used to pull more than 150 wagons along the 40-mile (64 km) trail from Mayer to the stream. Most of the workers were Apache and Mojave Indians, who built a dam, powerhouse, and about 8,800 feet (2,700 m) of concrete flumes to carry water to the Childs plant, along the Verde River near the mouth of the creek.

The Irving plant, along the creek between Childs and Fossil Springs, was constructed in 1915–16. The system of canyons and steep falls from the springs to the Verde River outlet provided an ideal location for a hydroelectric plant. The constant flow of 43 cubic feet per second (1.2 m^{3}/s) from the springs, the creek's main water source, was also a factor in site selection. Once completed, the two plants combined to produce 4.2 megawatts of electrical power.

To build the Childs plant, the Arizona Power Company raised money through investment bonds sold by William Bonbright and Company. The plant was named for S. W. Childs, the Bonbright Company's bond-broker. The Irving plant was named for Irving Bonbright, a co-founder of the Bonbright Company. The reservoir known as Stehr Lake was named for Frederick W. Stehr, treasurer of the Arizona Power Company.

The American Society of Mechanical Engineers named Childs-Irving an Historic Mechanical Engineering Landmark in 1976. In 1991, Childs-Irving was added to the National Register of Historic Places.

In 2005, after assessing costs, the plants' relatively low production of electricity, and the goodwill to be generated from stream restoration, APS closed both power plants. In 2008, APS removed the diversion dam, the flumes, and access roads, and planted native vegetation near the dam site.

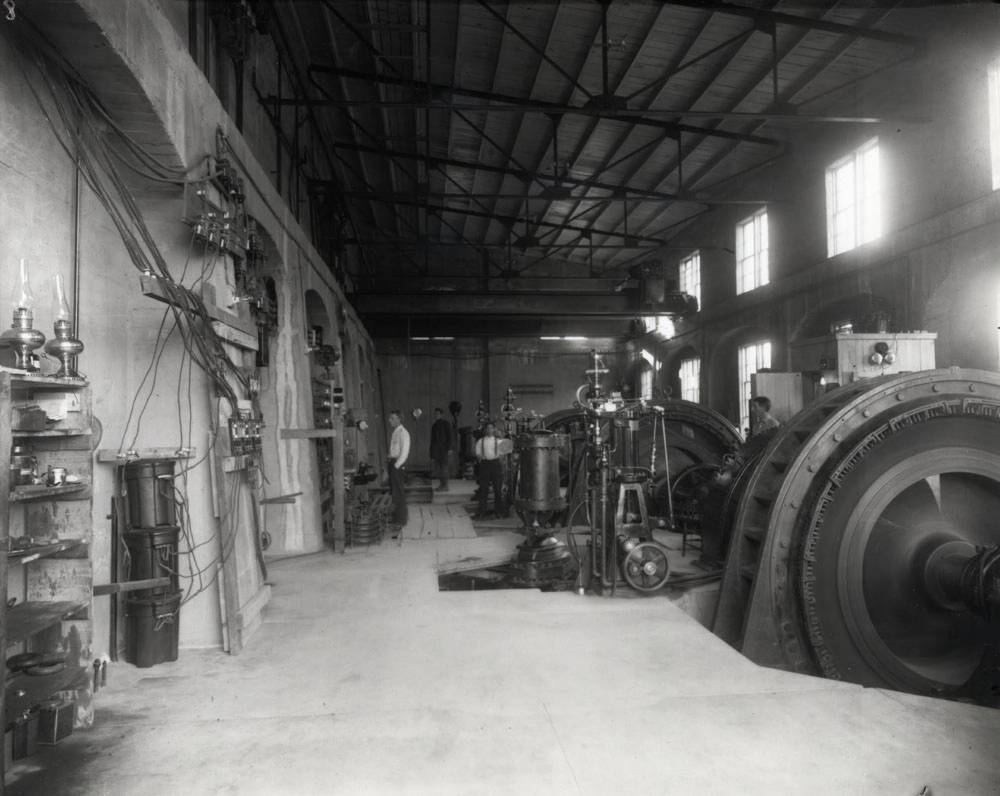
Interior of Childs power plant

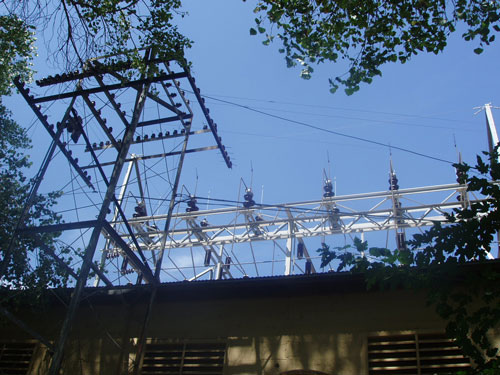
Power lines on the Childs plant roof

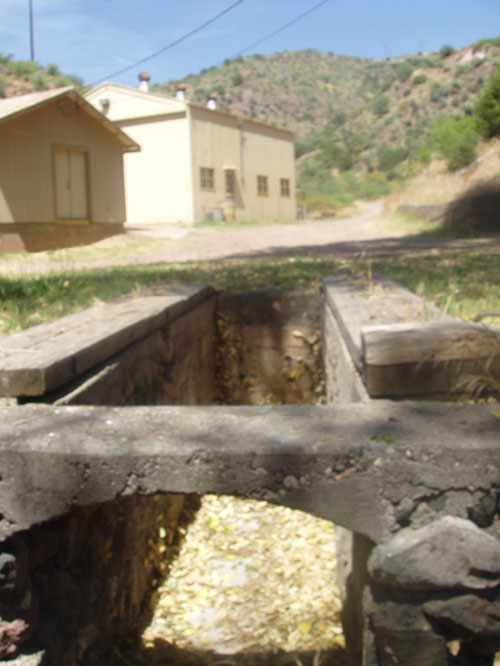
The Childs plant

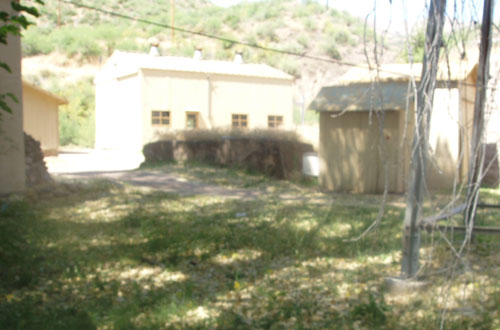
The Childs plant

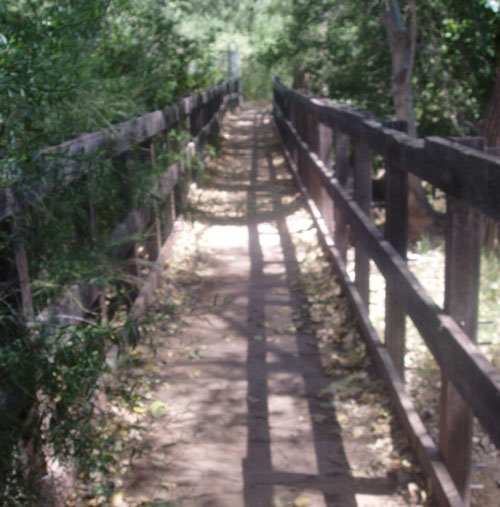
Bridge over the turbine outlets at the Childs plant

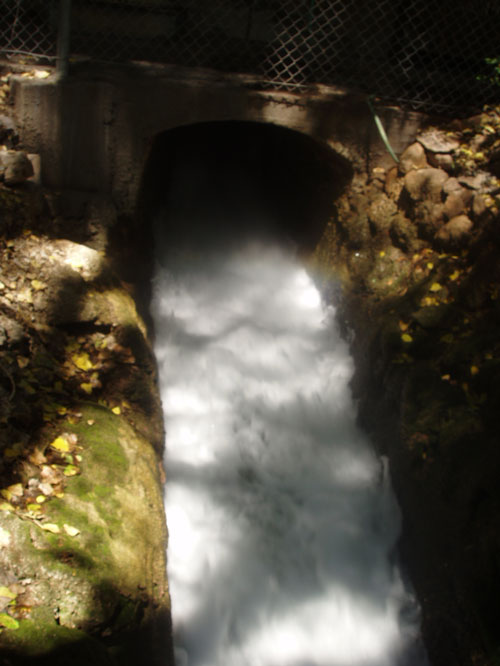
One of the turbine outlets in operation

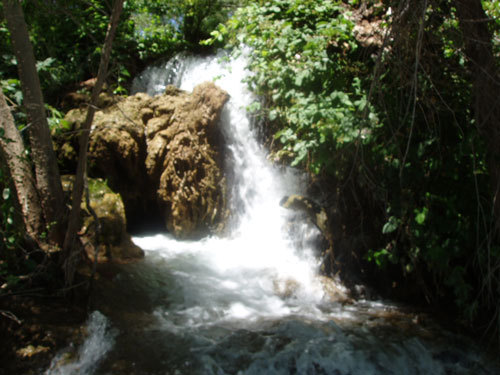
Water from the Childs turbines flows into the Verde River.

== Flume and tunnels ==
The first stage of development included a flume and tunnels made of concrete.

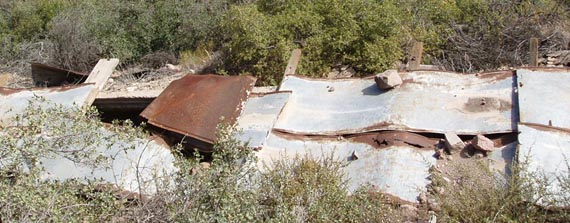
Flume

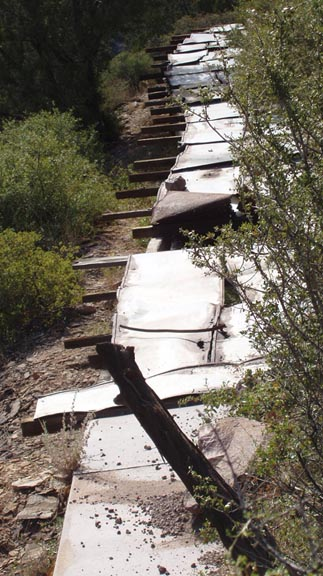
Flume

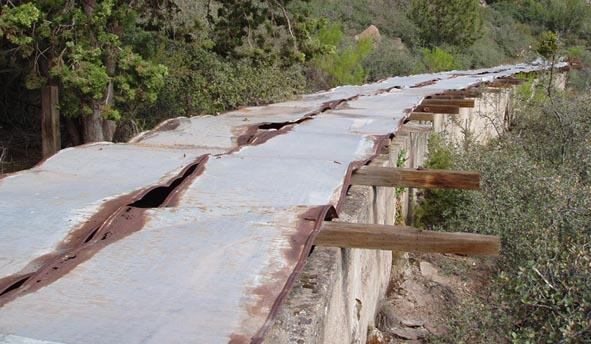
Flume

== Stehr Lake ==
Between the Irving and Childs plants, the creek water exited the flume and tunnels and entered an artificial reservoir, Stehr Lake. The lake provided a backup water supply for the Childs plant when the flume system above the lake was shut down for maintenance. The lake held enough water to run the plant normally for 3.5 days.

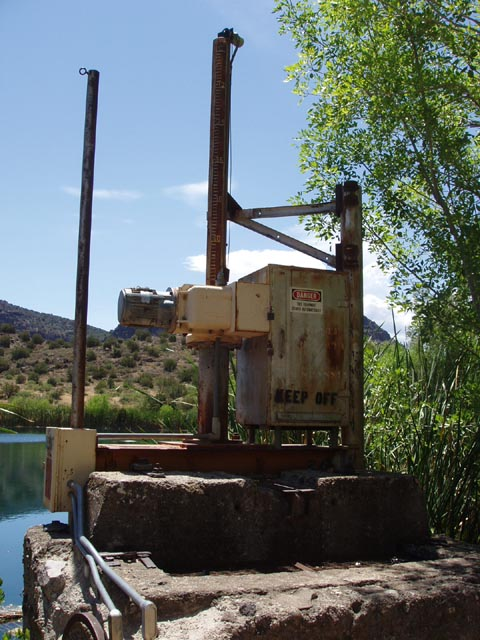
The flow from the flume is moderated as it enters Stehr Lake.

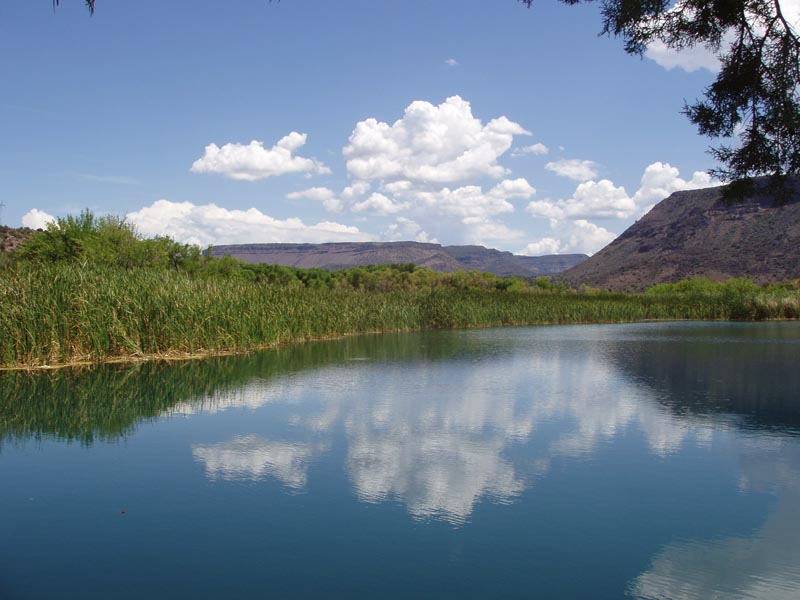
Stehr Lake

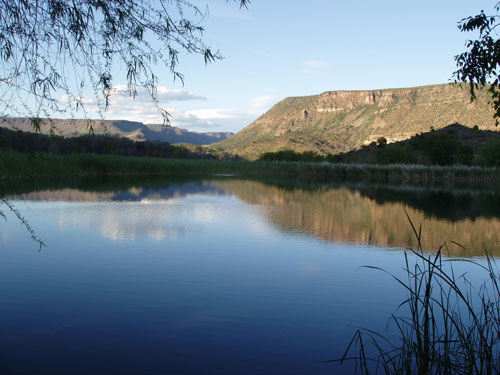
Stehr Lake

Fossil Springs and Creek were so named due to the large amount of calcium carbonate in the water, causing bone-like deposits, or travertine, to form in and around the creek bed.

== See also ==
- List of dam removals in Arizona
- Fossil Springs Wilderness
