= Fossil Creek Bridge =

Historic bridge in Gila County, Arizona

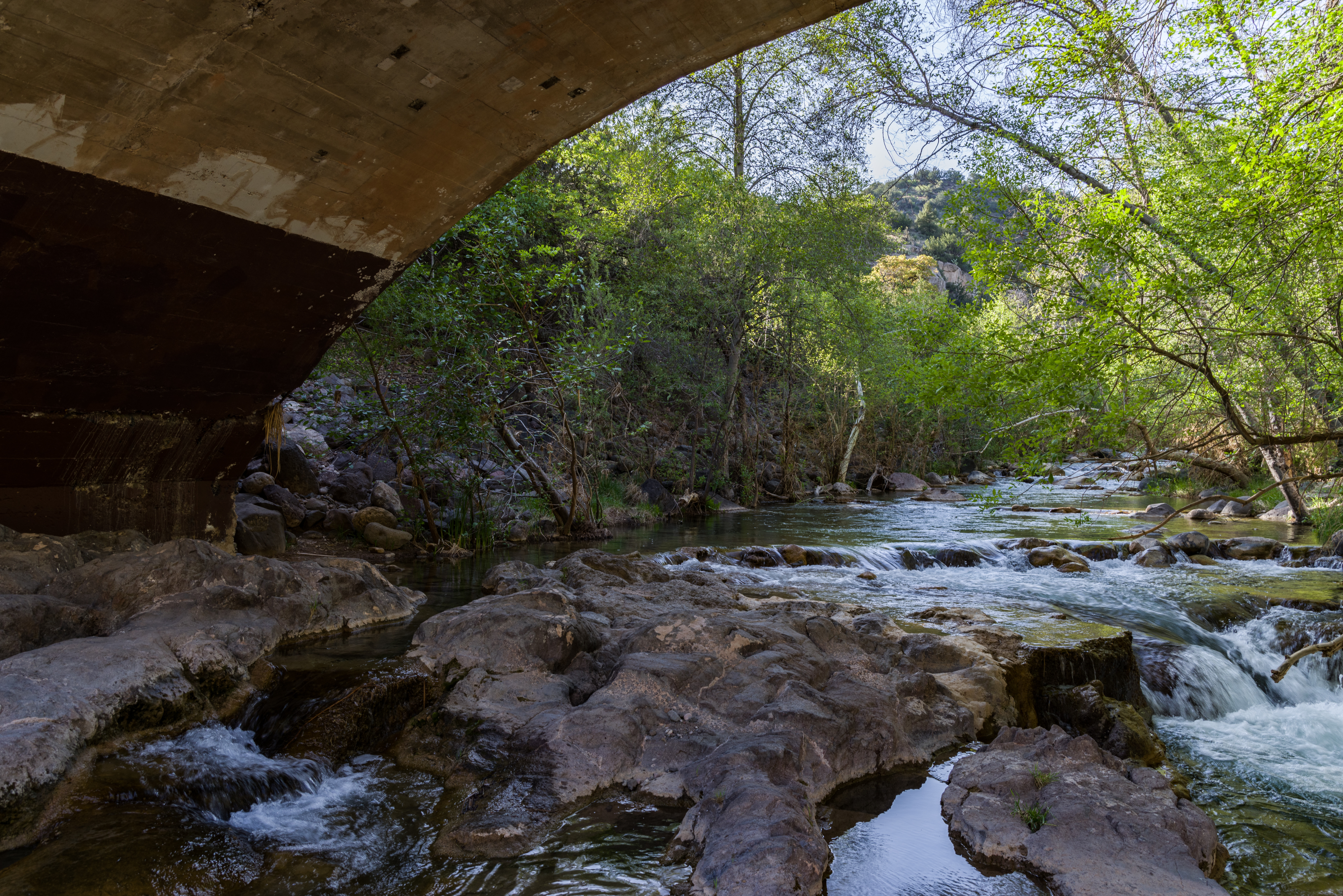
- Underside of bridge arch
- Coordinates: 34°23′38″N 111°37′44″W
- Carries: Fossil Creek Road
- Crosses: Fossil Creek
- Locale: near Strawberry, Arizona

Characteristics
- Design: Filled spandrel arch

History
- Construction end: 1924
- Fossil Creek Bridge
- U.S. National Register of Historic Places
- Location within Arizona Location within the United States
- Nearest city: Strawberry, Arizona
- Coordinates: 34°23′39″N 111°37′45″W
- Area: 0.1 acres (0.040 ha)
- Built: 1924–25
- Architectural style: Filled Spandrel Arch
- MPS: Vehicular Bridges in Arizona MPS
- NRHP reference No.: 88001620
- Added to NRHP: September 30, 1988

Location
- Interactive map of Fossil Creek Bridge

Fossil Creek Bridge is a closed-spandrel deck arch bridge built in the U.S. state of Arizona during 1924–25 on Cottonwood-Camp Verde-Pine road across Fossil Creek. The road, also known as Fossil Creek Road, crosses the creek at a point where it forms the border between Yavapai and Gila counties, and between the Tonto and the Prescott National Forests. The nearest town is Strawberry in Gila County. It is not far from Camp Verde in Yavapai County.

It has a 70-foot (21 m) span, a 14-foot (4.3 m) arch rise, Luten arch-like reinforcing and bulkheads. It cost $10,037 to build. It was designed by the Arizona Highway Department early in 1924 and completed later that year.
