= Pine-Strawberry Elementary School District =

School district in Arizona, United States

Address
- 3868 North Pine Creek Drive Pine, Arizona, 85544; United States

District information
- Type: Public
- Grades: PreK–8
- NCES District ID: 0406510

Students and staff
- Students: 125
- Teachers: 17.11
- Staff: 21.31
- Student–teacher ratio: 7.31

Other information
- Website: www.pineesd.org

Pine-Strawberry School District 12 is a school district in Arizona. Much of the district is in Gila County, where it includes the communities of Pine and Strawberry. A small section of the district extends into Yavapai County.

The Chevelon Butte School District, which covers most of Blue Ridge, does not operate any schools. It sends its Blue Ridge area students to the Pine-Strawberry district for elementary school.
