= List of dams and reservoirs in Arizona =

Following is a list of dams and reservoirs in Arizona.

All major dams are linked below. The National Inventory of Dams defines any "major dam" as being 50 feet (15 m) tall with a storage capacity of at least 5,000 acre-feet (6,200,000 m^{3}), or of any height with a storage capacity of 25,000 acre-feet (31,000,000 m^{3}).

== Dams and reservoirs in Arizona ==
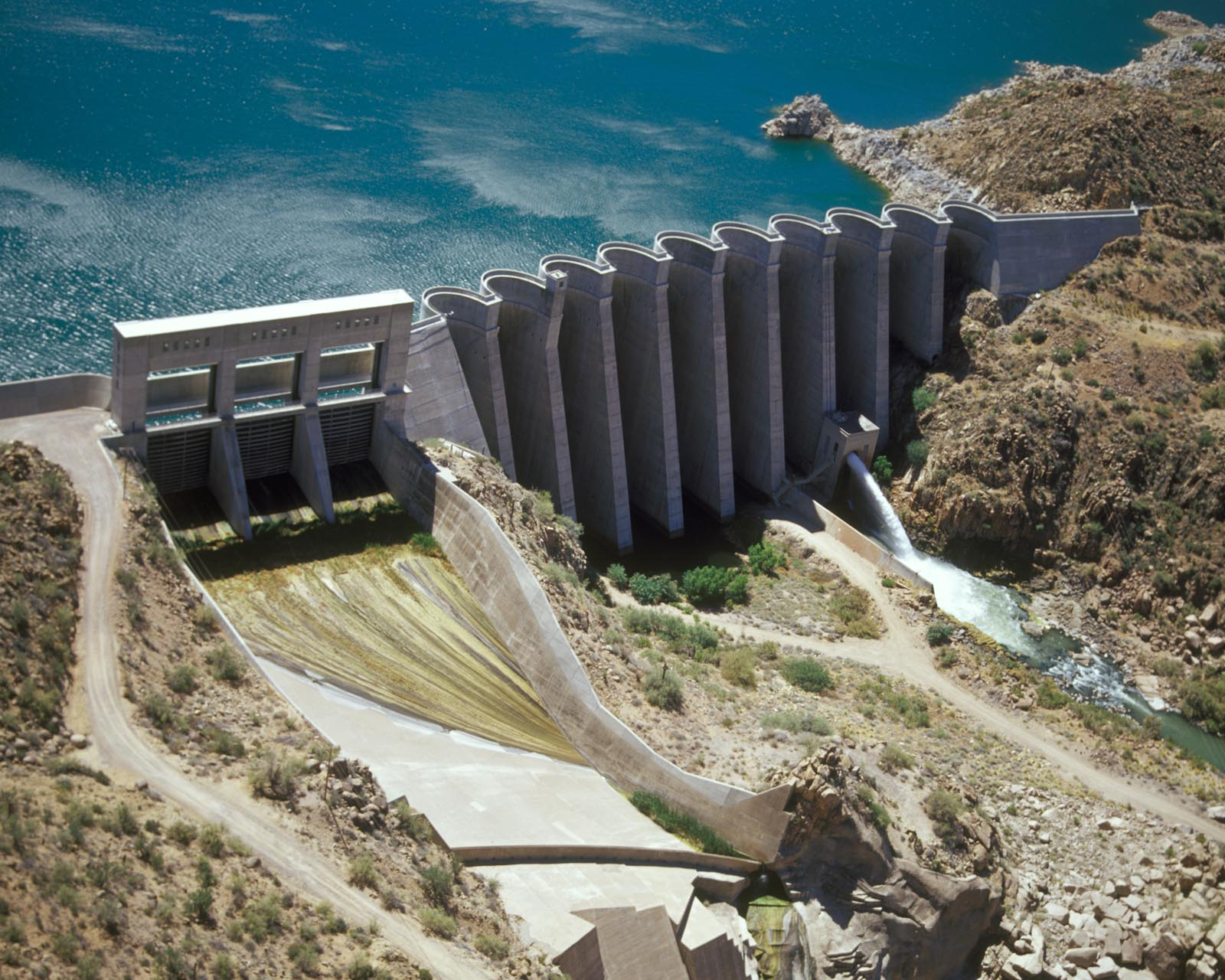
Bartlett Dam

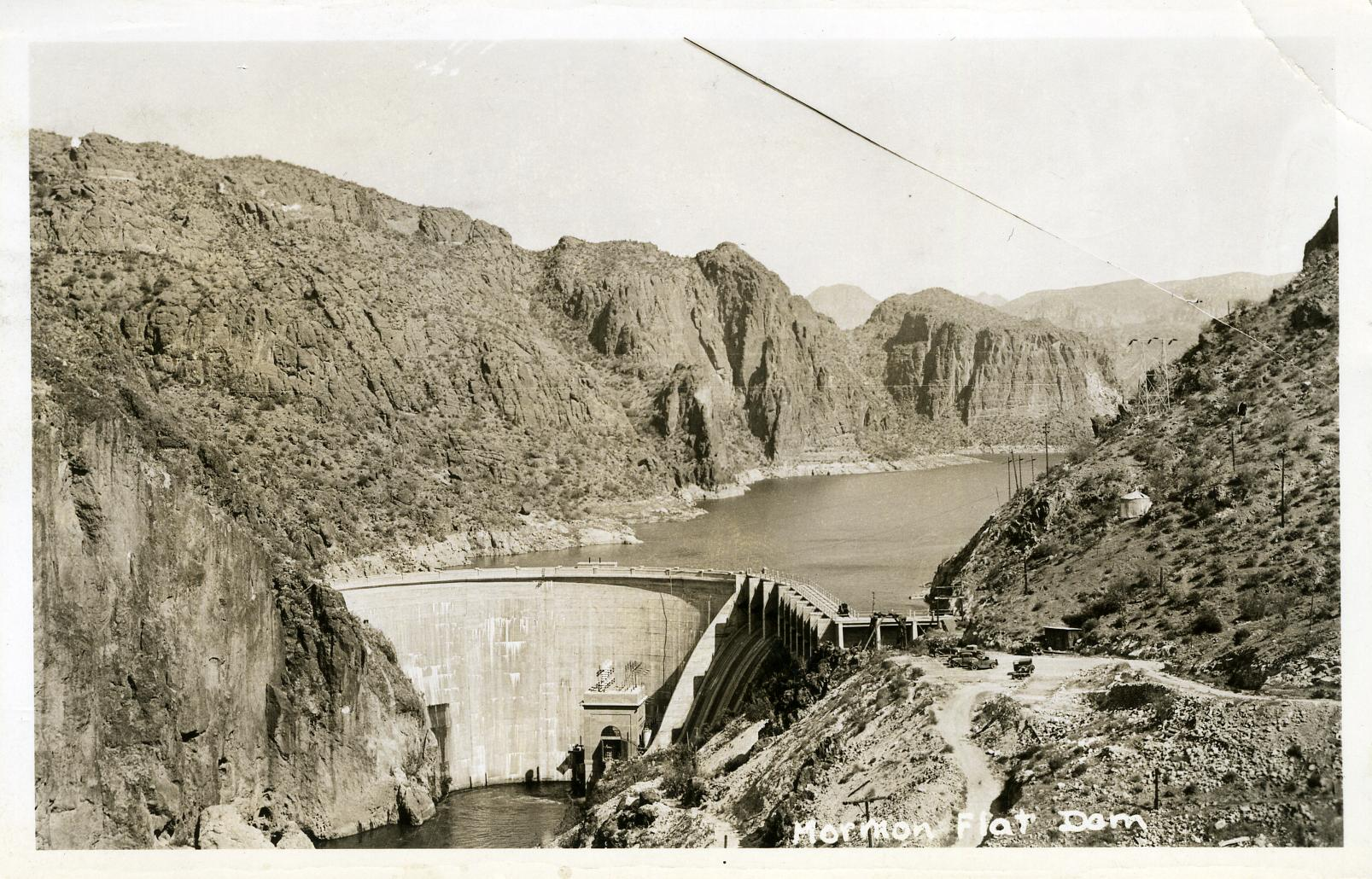
Mormon Flat Dam

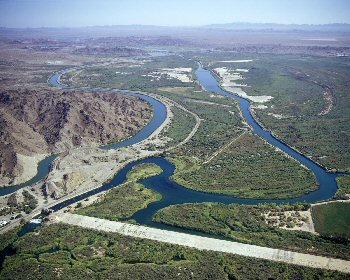
Laguna Diversion Dam

This list is incomplete. You can help Wikipedia by expanding it.

- Alamo Dam, Alamo Lake, United States Army Corps of Engineers
- Ashfork-Bainbridge Steel Dam, Steel Dam Reservoir, privately owned
- Bartlett Dam, Bartlett Lake, United States Bureau of Reclamation
- Cave Buttes Dam, Cave Creek Reservoir, Flood Control District of Maricopa County
- Childs-Irving Hydroelectric Facilities, Stehr Lake, privately owned
- Coolidge Dam, San Carlos Lake, United States Bureau of Indian Affairs
- Davis Dam, Lake Mohave, USBR
- Gillespie Dam, unnamed reservoir, privately owned
- Glen Canyon Dam, Lake Powell, USBR
- Granite Basin Dam, Granite Basin Lake, United States Forest Service
- Granite Reef Diversion Dam, unnamed reservoir of the Salt River, USBR
- Headgate Rock Dam, unnamed reservoir, Flood Control District of Maricopa County
- Hoover Dam, Lake Mead, USBR
- Horse Mesa Dam, Apache Lake, USBR
- Horseshoe Dam, Horseshoe Lake, USBR
- Imperial Dam, Imperial Reservoir, USBR
- Laguna Diversion Dam, unnamed reservoir of the Colorado River, USBR (on California border)
- Lyman Dam, Lyman Reservoir, privately owned
- Morelos Dam, unnamed reservoir of the Colorado River, International Boundary and Water Commission (on Mexican border)
- Mormon Flat Dam, Canyon Lake, USBR
- New Cornelia Tailings Dam, largest US dam by volume, privately owned
- New Waddell Dam, Lake Pleasant, USBR
- Painted Rock Dam, Painted Rock Reservoir, USACE
- Palo Verde Dam, diversion dam on the Colorado River, USBR
- Parker Dam, Lake Havasu, USBR
- Stewart Mountain Dam, Saguaro Lake, USBR
- Theodore Roosevelt Dam, Theodore Roosevelt Lake, USBR

== See also ==
- List of dam removals in Arizona
