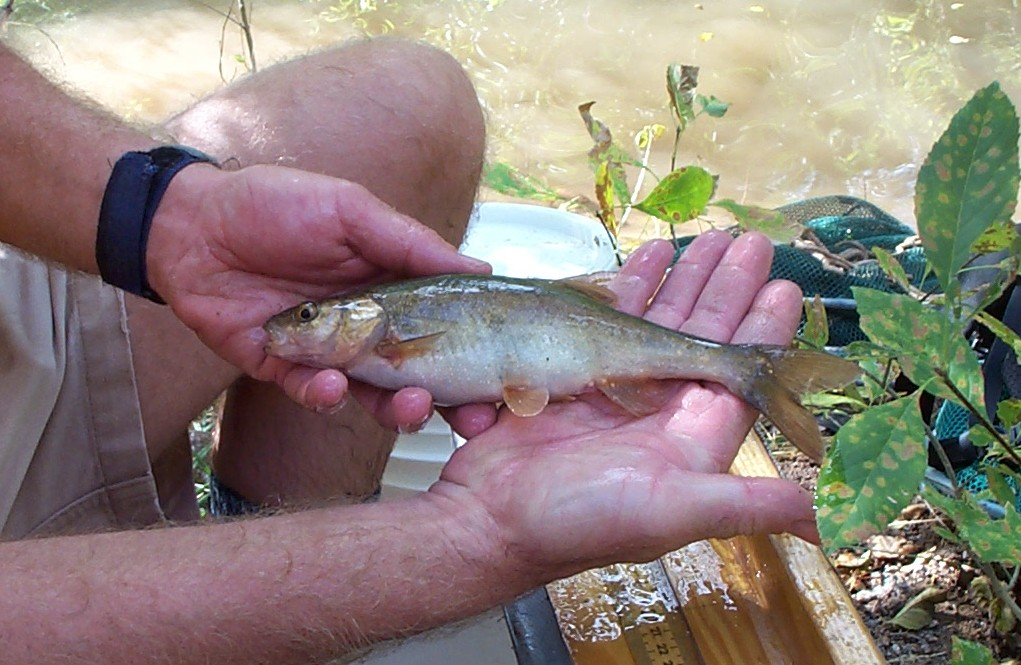

Conservation status
- Near Threatened (IUCN 3.1)

Scientific classification
- Kingdom: Animalia
- Phylum: Chordata
- Class: Actinopterygii
- Order: Cypriniformes
- Family: Leuciscidae
- Genus: Gila
- Species: G. nigra

Binomial name
- Gila nigra Cope, 1875

= Headwater chub =

Species of fish

The headwater chub (Gila nigra) is a species of fish in the family Cyprinidae. It is found in Arizona and New Mexico.

== Description ==
The body of the headwater chub is thick and chunky to streamlined but not markedly attenuate. The maximum size of the male fish is about 50 cm females are about 10–18 cm total length. The coloration of the fish is dark olive-gray or brown above, with a silver side, and white below. The longitudinal stripes are often diffuse, and are rarely with dark dorsal-lateral blotches. The caudal peduncle is not pencil-like, its length is less than its head length; the fins are small to moderate in size, sometimes convex, and are rarely curved, with inter-radial membranes of fins variously pigmented. Scales are developed and cover the entire body, with the basal radii variable. There are 73-83 lateral scales, with usually 8 dorsal and anal fin rays, and rarely 7 or 9 fin rays.

Similar species include the humpback chub (Gila cypha) and bonytail chub (G. elegans), however, these fish have extremely slender caudal peduncles, smaller eyes, angle along anal fin base continuing above the caudal fin. Large individuals have a hump on their nape, and a depressed head which is absent on the headwater chub. Gila nigra are somewhat trout-like in appearance, except they lack an adipose fin. Not surprisingly, they are morphologically intermediate between the roundtail chub (Gila robusta) and the Gila chub (Gila intermedia).

== Range ==
Headwater chubs are endemic to the Gila River basin of Arizona and New Mexico where they occupy the middle and headwater reaches of middle-sized streams. Populations have been recognized from the mainstream Gila River (above confluence with Mangus Creek) in New Mexico, this includes West, Middle and East forks of the Gila River, along with the San Carlos River (a tributary to the Gila). They are also identified from Ash Creek (tributary to San Carlos River), Tonto Creek (tributary to the Salt River), and Spring Creek, (tributary of Tonto Creek). In the Verde River system, they inhabit Upper Fossil Creek (above the diversion dam), East Verde River and Deadman Creek.

== Habitat ==
Adult headwater chub occupy cool to warm water in mid- to headwater stretches of mid-sized streams of the Gila River basin. They are associated with deep, near shore pools adjacent to swift riffles and runs, and near obstructions. Cover consists of root wads, boulders, undercut banks, submerged organic debris, or deep water. In Fossil Creek, they were found in water more than 1.8 m deep with velocities under 0.10 meters per second. Substrates they are associated with include gravel, small boulders, and large in-stream objects. Preferred water temperature ranges of 20-27 °C with a minimum temperature around 7 °C. Juveniles are associated with shallow, low velocity habitat with overhead cover. In Fossil Creek, headwater chub seem to select depths between 0.9 and 1.5 m and velocities of 0.15 meters per second and are found over sand substrate.

The headwater chub are associated with substrates including gravel, small boulders, and large in-stream objects. The preferred water temperature ranges of the headwater chub are 20-27 °C with a minimum temperature around 7 °C. Juveniles are associated with shallow, low velocity habitat with overhead cover. In Fossil Creek, they seem to select depths between 0.9 and 1.5 m and velocities of 0.15 mps and are found over sand substrate.

The headwater chub life span is 8–10 years. They grow rapidly but growth is dependent on water temperature. The maximum size of the fish is about 50 cm.

== Population trends ==
As with many native fish, reductions in range and numbers are likely the result of habitat loss, as well as competition with, and predation by, non-native fish species.

== Management factors ==
Activities that are known to be detrimental to populations should be avoided, including dewatering of habitats through re-routing stream water, stream impoundment, channelization, domestic livestock grazing, timber harvesting, mining, road construction, polluting, and stocking non-native fish.

- Threats: aquifer pumping; stream diversion; reduction in stream flows; predation by and competition with nonnative fishes.
- Management needs: watershed and stream flow protection; research to determine mechanisms of disappearance; ameliorate effects of deleterious nonnative fishes.

== Protective measures taken ==
This species is currently being considered for T & E listing by the US Fish and Wildlife Service.
