= G. nigra =

G. nigra may refer to:

- Geochelone nigra, the largest living tortoise species, native to seven islands of the Galápagos archipelago
- Gila nigra, the headwater chub, a fish species found in Arizona and New Mexico

== Synonyms ==
- Gymnadenia nigra, a synonym for Nigritella nigra, an orchid species found in Europe and Israel

== See also ==
- Nigra (disambiguation)
