= Fossil Springs Wilderness =

Coconino National Forest wilderness area

- IUCN category Ib (wilderness area)
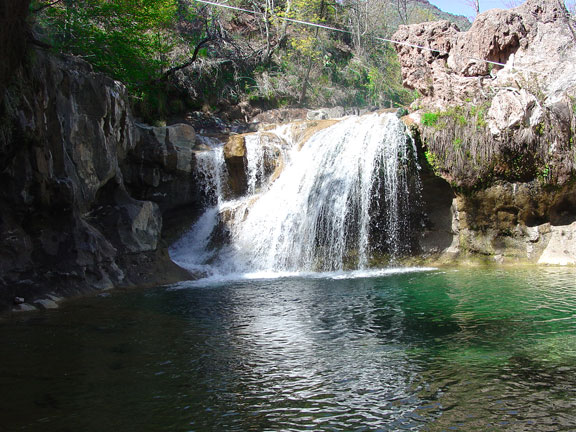
- Interactive map of Fossil Springs Wilderness
- Location: Gila and Yavapai counties, Arizona, United States
- Nearest city: Strawberry, Arizona
- Coordinates: 34°26′56″N 111°32′35″W
- Area: 11,550 acres (47 km^{2})
- Established: 1984
- Governing body: U.S. Forest Service

Fossil Springs Wilderness is an 11,550-acre (4,674 ha) wilderness area within the Coconino National Forest in the U.S. state of Arizona. It is at the bottom of a steep canyon at the edge of the Colorado Plateau, just south of the Mogollon Rim. Here, water emerges at the surface at the rate of about 2,700 cubic feet (76 m^{3}) per minute. The perennial water supply supports one of the most diverse riparian ecosystems in the state, with more than 30 species of trees set among native desert shrub. It also creates a haven for abundant wildlife, including elk, deer, javelina, coyote, skunk, racoon, ring-tailed cat, fox, mountain lion, black bear and more than 100 species of birds.

== See also ==
- Fossil Creek
- List of U.S. Wilderness Areas
- List of Arizona Wilderness Areas
- Wilderness Act
