= Fossil Creek =

Perennial stream in Arizona, US

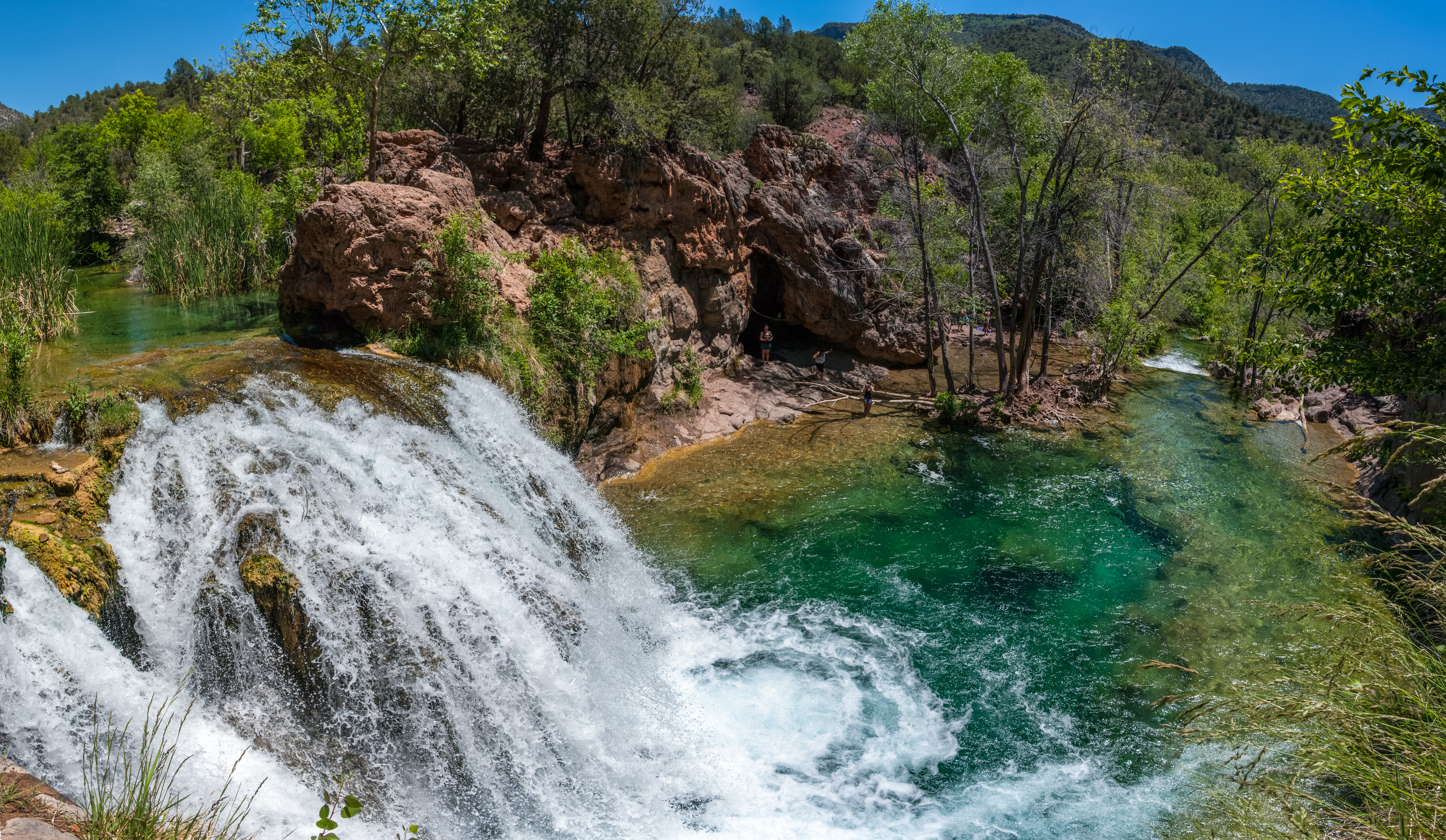
- Waterfall on Fossil Creek

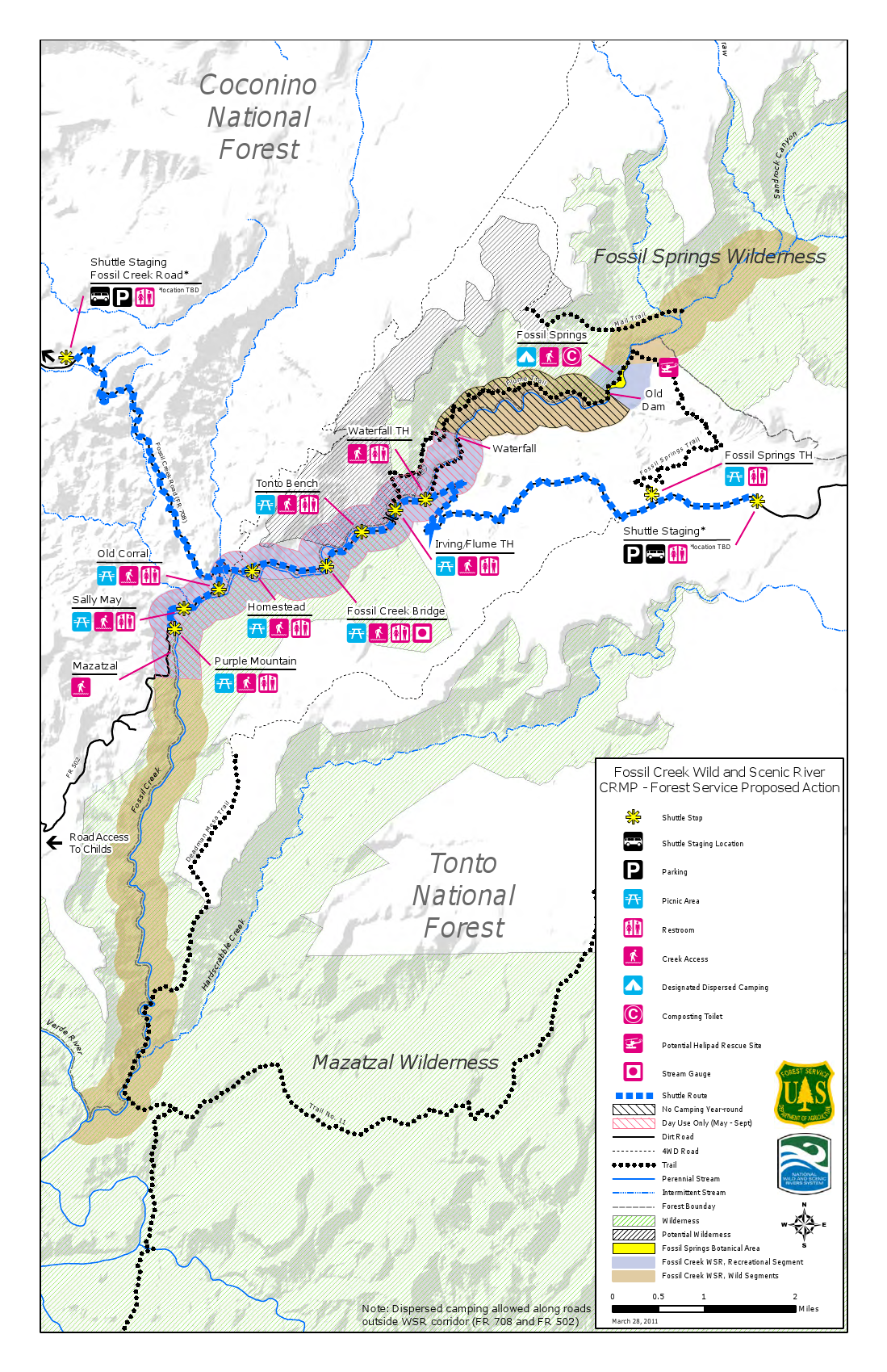
- Fossil Creek proposal map (March 2011)

- Location of the mouth of Fossil Creek at the Verde River
- Etymology: the resemblance to fossils of the stream's rocks and vegetation, coated with travertine
- Native name: Hakhavsuwa (Yavapai)

Location
- Country: United States
- State: Arizona
- County: Coconino, Yavapai, Gila
- City: Strawberry

Physical characteristics
- Source
  - coordinates: 34°26′07″N 111°30′31″W
  - elevation: 6,510 ft (1,980 m)
- Mouth: Verde River
  - coordinates: 34°18′21″N 111°40′32″W
  - elevation: 2,543 ft (775 m)
- Length: 17 mi (27 km)
- Basin size: 135 sq mi (350 km^{2})
- Discharge
  - location: Fossil Creek Bridge (Note: The stream gauge at Fossil Creek Bridge was installed in September 2010. Before that, the creek was never gauged, although the flume was gauged and the Verde River was gauged at Tangle Creek, below the mouth of Fossil Creek. The average discharge of 43 cubic feet per second (1.2 m^{3}/s) cited here represents the base flow emanating from Fossil Springs. The maximum and minimum flows were measured at the bridge in 2010 and 2011.)
  - average: 43 cu ft/s (1.2 m^{3}/s) (Note: The stream gauge at Fossil Creek Bridge was installed in September 2010. Before that, the creek was never gauged, although the flume was gauged and the Verde River was gauged at Tangle Creek, below the mouth of Fossil Creek. The average discharge of 43 cubic feet per second (1.2 m^{3}/s) cited here represents the base flow emanating from Fossil Springs. The maximum and minimum flows were measured at the bridge in 2010 and 2011.)
  - minimum: 39 cu ft/s (1.1 m^{3}/s)
  - maximum: 885 cu ft/s (25.1 m^{3}/s)

National Wild and Scenic Rivers System
- Type: Wild, Recreational
- Designated: March 30, 2009

Fossil Creek (Yavapai: Hakhavsuwa or Vialnyucha) is a perennial stream accessed by a forest road near the community of Camp Verde in the U.S. state of Arizona. Access is from Forest Road 708 off Arizona State Route 260 east of Camp Verde. A tributary of the Verde River, Fossil Creek flows from its headwaters on the Mogollon Rim to meet the larger stream near the former Childs Power Plant.

Fossil Springs, near the headwaters, emits upwards of 20,000 US gallons (76 m^{3}) per minute that flow into the creek year-round. Calcium carbonate, precipitating from the 72 °F (22 °C) water from the springs, creates travertine dams and deposits for several miles downstream. The Fossil Creek system is the fourth largest producer of travertine in the United States.

Fossil Creek is one of only two streams in Arizona included in the National Wild and Scenic Rivers System. The creek and its riparian corridor provide habitat for a wide variety of flora and fauna, some listed as endangered or otherwise imperiled. Its former power-plant complex is listed as a National Historic District. Since restoration of the stream's natural flow in 2008, an increase in recreational visits has raised concerns about overuse and has led to road closings and other restrictions.

== Course ==
Fossil Springs, the head water of Fossil Creek, arises at an elevation of 6,510 feet (1,980 m) above sea level on the Mogollon Rim in Coconino County north of Strawberry. For about the first 3 miles (5 km), the creek's flow is intermittent.

From high on the rim, the creek runs generally north, entering Gila County almost immediately. It continues north through the wilderness to the confluence of an intermittent stream in Calf Pen Canyon, which enters from the right. Turning west, the creek receives another intermittent stream from the right in Sandrock Canyon, at the head of Fossil Creek Canyon. Before it reaches Fossil Springs, the creek becomes the boundary between Gila County on the stream's left and Yavapai County on its right, and it remains the boundary all the way to the Verde River.

The perennial stretches of the stream begin at Fossil Springs, at river mile (RM) 14 or river kilometer (RK) 23, in the Fossil Springs Wilderness of the Coconino National Forest at an elevation of about 4,100 feet (1,200 m). Below the springs, the creek flows west and southwest, passing the remnants of a former dam. Unnamed intermittent streams enter from left and right. Before Fossil Creek reaches the former Irving Power Plant, it leaves the Fossil Springs Wilderness, and below the plant, it enters the Mazatzal Wilderness of the Tonto National Forest. Forest Road 708 (Fossil Creek Road) follows the creek for 2.5 miles (4.0 km) along this stretch, crossing the creek once at Fossil Creek Bridge.

After Cimarron Creek Wash enters from the right, Fossil Creek turns sharply south. In the next stretch, Stehr Lakebed (dry) is to the right and Deadman Mesa to the left. Hardscrabble Creek enters from the left just before Fossil Creek turns west again and enters the Verde River.

=== Discharge ===
The flow of water from Fossil Springs has been estimated to range from 43 to 56 cubic feet per second (1.2 to 1.6 m^{3}/s) (320–420 gal/s) year-round, and it emerges from underground at a constant 72 °F (22 °C). The United States Geological Survey installed a stream gauge at the Fossil Creek Bridge in 2010. The maximum daily discharge at that station was 885 cubic feet per second (25.1 m^{3}/s) on February 19, 2011, and the minimum was 39 cubic feet per second (1.1 m^{3}/s) on August 6, 2011.

== Geology ==
Fossil Creek Canyon is about 1,600 feet (490 m) deep and varies in width from 2 miles (3 km) at Fossil Springs to less than 1 mile (1.6 km) in places further downstream. Rocks in the canyon vary in age from the Precambrian through the Cenozoic. North of the springs the canyon cuts through Paleozoic sedimentary rocks including the Redwall Limestone, Naco Group, Supai Group, Schnebly Hill Formation, Coconino Sandstone, and Kaibab Formation. South of the springs, the rocks of the canyon are Tertiary volcanics, mostly dark-gray basalt and yellow-gray tuff.

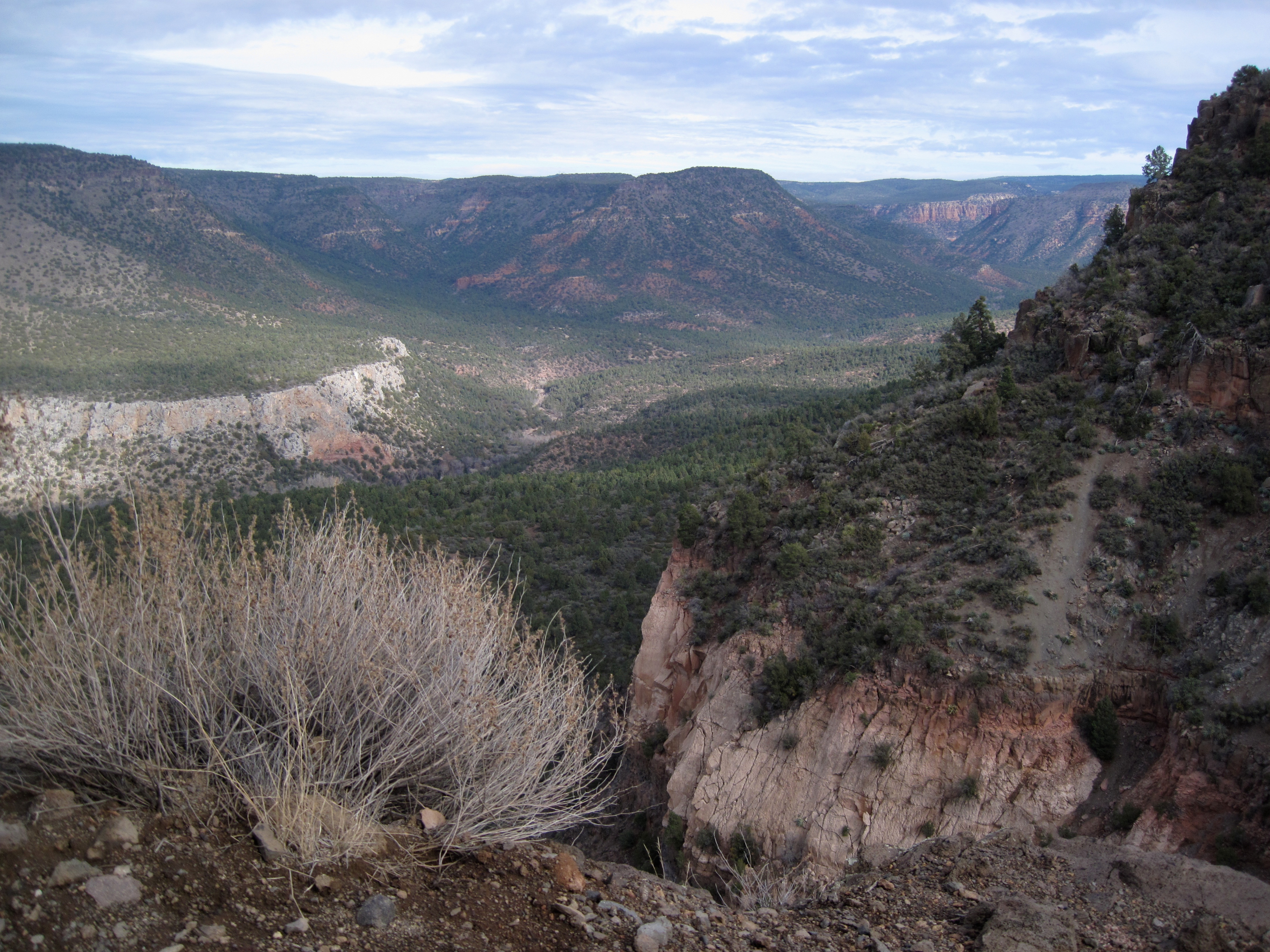
Fossil Creek Canyon, viewed from road to Strawberry in 2010

Fossil Springs, the source of about 80 percent of the water in Fossil Creek, issues from several vents in close proximity to one another at the base of the Mogollon Rim. The rim is the southern edge of the Colorado Plateau. Water percolating through limestone layers in the rim becomes laden with dissolved carbon dioxide and calcium carbonate. When the water emerges at the springs, it begins to release carbon dioxide as a gas and calcium carbonate as travertine, a porous form of calcite often found around hot springs such as Mammoth Hot Springs in Yellowstone National Park. The release, affected by stream turbulence and other factors, does not occur all at once but continues downstream.

Nineteenth-century observers of the creek reported seeing many naturally occurring travertine dams with deep pools behind them. A study conducted in 1996 identified the eroded remnants of at least 80 such dams. After the creek's natural flow was restored in 2008, hundreds of new travertine dams began to form along a 6-mile (10 km) stretch below Fossil Springs. About 13 short tons (12 t) of travertine per day are deposited along the stream. This rate of deposition makes Fossil Creek the fourth largest travertine system in the United States; the three larger systems are Mammoth Hot Springs, Havasu Creek, and Blue Springs of the Little Colorado River.

== History ==
=== Early ===
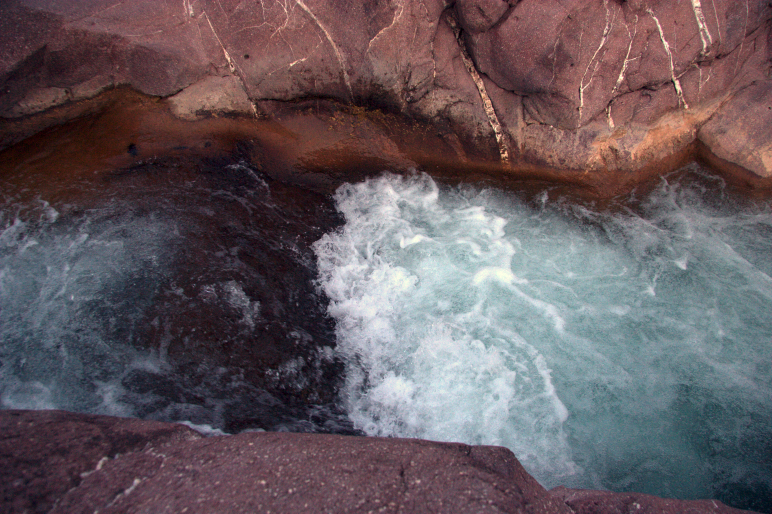
Lower Fossil Creek, 2008

Archaeologists have found evidence of prehistoric use of the Fossil Creek watershed, and it is possible that people lived here as long as 10,000 years ago. More recently, Yavapai and Apache peoples have lived in the area, also used by 19th-century cattlemen and shepherds.

Fossil Creek first appeared on maps in Arizona in the 1860s, when Arizona Territory's first governor, John Noble Goodwin, passed through the region. Members of the Goodwin group noted "petrifactions", travertine-encased rocks and twigs that looked like fossils, hence the name Fossil Creek.

=== Hydroelectric plants ===
Few streams in Arizona have a flow as large and steady as Fossil Creek's. Although remote, the stream was seen in the early 20th century as a good place to produce electricity for the copper mines of Jerome and the gold and silver mines of the Bradshaw Mountains. In 1908, construction began on a hydropower plant on the Verde River at Childs under the authority of the Arizona Power Company, later part of the Arizona Public Service Company (APS). The project included creating a diversion dam, 25 feet (7.6 m) high, across the creek. About 8,800 feet (2,700 m) of concrete flumes carried water from the dam to the Childs plant. An artificial reservoir, Stehr Lake, held enough water to keep the plant operating at normal capacity for up to 3.5 days when the flume system was closed for maintenance. In 1916, the company constructed a second plant, the Irving Power Plant, along Fossil Creek.

Childs-Irving was the first hydroelectric power plant built in Arizona, and in 1920 it was supplying as much as 70 percent of the power used by Phoenix. The complex was named an Historic Mechanical Engineering Landmark in 1976 and a National Historic District in 1991.

=== Stream restoration ===
In 2004 invasive species were removed from the creek to maximize native fish survival. A fish barrier 5 miles (8 km) from the mouth prevents invasive species from swimming further upstream. In 2005, after assessing costs, the plants' low output, and the goodwill to be generated from stream restoration, APS closed both power plants, and in 2008 APS removed the diversion dam.

In 2009 President Barack Obama signed legislation designating Fossil Creek as a National Wild and Scenic River, after a long campaign by the Arizona Nature Conservancy. The legislation, passed by Congress, protects 16.8 miles (27.0 km) of stream. The 2.7-mile (4.3 km) segment from the confluence of Sand Rock and Calf Pen canyons to where the stream leaves the Fossil Spring Wilderness is "wild". The 7.5-mile (12.1 km) stretch from there to the Mazatzal Wilderness boundary is "recreational", and the remaining 6.6 miles (10.6 km) of the stream is "wild". Fossil Creek is one of only two streams in Arizona with Wild and Scenic segments; the other is the Verde River.

== Fauna and flora ==
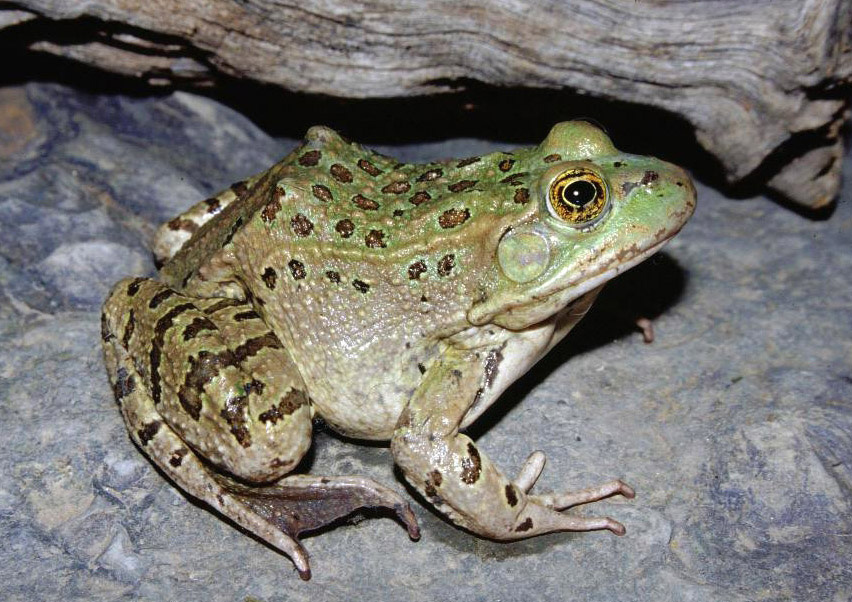
Chiricahua leopard frog, a threatened species found in the Fossil Creek watershed

The creek and its riparian zone support about 200 species of birds, mammals, reptiles, and amphibians. The list includes many special-status species such as the southwestern willow flycatcher and Chiricahua leopard frog. The watershed supports 27 species of neotropical migratory birds such as the sage sparrow and 20 species such as the common black hawk that are rated sensitive by the U.S. Forest Service. Mammals found in or near Fossil Creek include otter and beaver, Merriam's shrew, a variety of bats, and other species. Among the reptiles and amphibians are the Arizona toad, and the reticulated Gila monster.

Native fish in Fossil Creek include headwater chub, roundtail chub, speckled dace, longfin dace, Sonora sucker, and desert sucker. Between 2007 and 2010, the Arizona Game and Fish Department and the U.S. Fish and Wildlife Service added native spikedace, loach minnows, Gila topminnows, and razorback suckers as well as more longfin dace above the barrier. All except speckled dace are special-status fish listed as endangered, threatened, or sensitive by federal or state agencies. In addition, more than 100 macroinvertebrate species live in the Fossil Creek watershed. One, the fossil springsnail, is listed sensitive by the U.S. Forest Service.

Fossil Creek's riparian zones provide high-quality habitat for plant species native to the area. These include deciduous trees such as the Arizona alder and Fremont cottonwood as well as a wide variety of shrubs, grasses, ferns, and other understory plants. Species diversity is higher above the site of the former power-plant dam, especially near Fossil Springs. In 1987, a 26-acre (11 ha) plot above the dam was set aside as the Fossil Springs Botanical Area. Plant inventories taken between 2003 and 2005 identified 166 plant species in the botanical area and 314 species of flowering plants and ferns in the larger Fossil Creek area.

== Recreation ==
Fossil Creek's steady flow, warmth, deep pools, and small waterfalls attract visitors who wade, swim, float, kayak, and snorkel in its waters. Four named hiking paths intersect the Fossil Creek corridor: the Flume–Irving, Fossil Springs, Mail, and Deadman Mesa trails. The U.S. Forest Service allows dispersed camping in some parts of the area but has made other parts, such as riparian zones, off-limits to overnight stays. Other activities in the area include wildlife viewing, photography, fishing, and visits to the remains of the Childs-Irving infrastructure.

Restoring the stream has made the area, a two-hour drive from Phoenix, highly popular. As recreational use of Fossil Creek increased after 2008, accumulations of trash and human waste as well as damage to forests and stream banks became problematic. Access is from Forest Road 708 (Fossil Creek Road) off Arizona State Route 260 east of Camp Verde, which is 22 miles (35 km) by paved highway and unpaved road from the creek. The Forest Service at times closes parts of Forest Road 708 because of weather, health, and safety concerns. Campfires are prohibited between the Fossil Creek headwaters and the dry bed of Stehr Lake, and other restrictions apply. From April 1 to October 1, vehicle parking at Fossil Creek is available only by advanced permit through www.recreation.gov. The Fossil Creek Comprehensive Management Plan, completed in 2021, is available online.

== See also ==
- Childs-Irving Hydroelectric Facilities
- Fossil Springs Wilderness
- List of historic properties in Pine-Strawberry, Arizona
- List of rivers of Arizona

== Sources ==
- Duperrault, Matt (2003). "Fossil Creek Wild and Scenic River Study" (PDF). Prescott: Arizona Wilderness Coalition. Archived (PDF) from the original on October 9, 2006.
- Plummer, Charles C.; McGeary, David (1988). Physical Geology (4th ed.). Dubuque, Iowa: Wm. C. Brown Publishers. ISBN 978-0-697-05092-2.
- U.S. Forest Service (2011). "Fossil Creek Wild and Scenic River Resource Assessment" (PDF). National Wild and Scenic Rivers System. Archived (PDF) from the original on August 24, 2015.
