= Pine, Arizona =

CDP in Gila County, Arizona

- Census-designated place
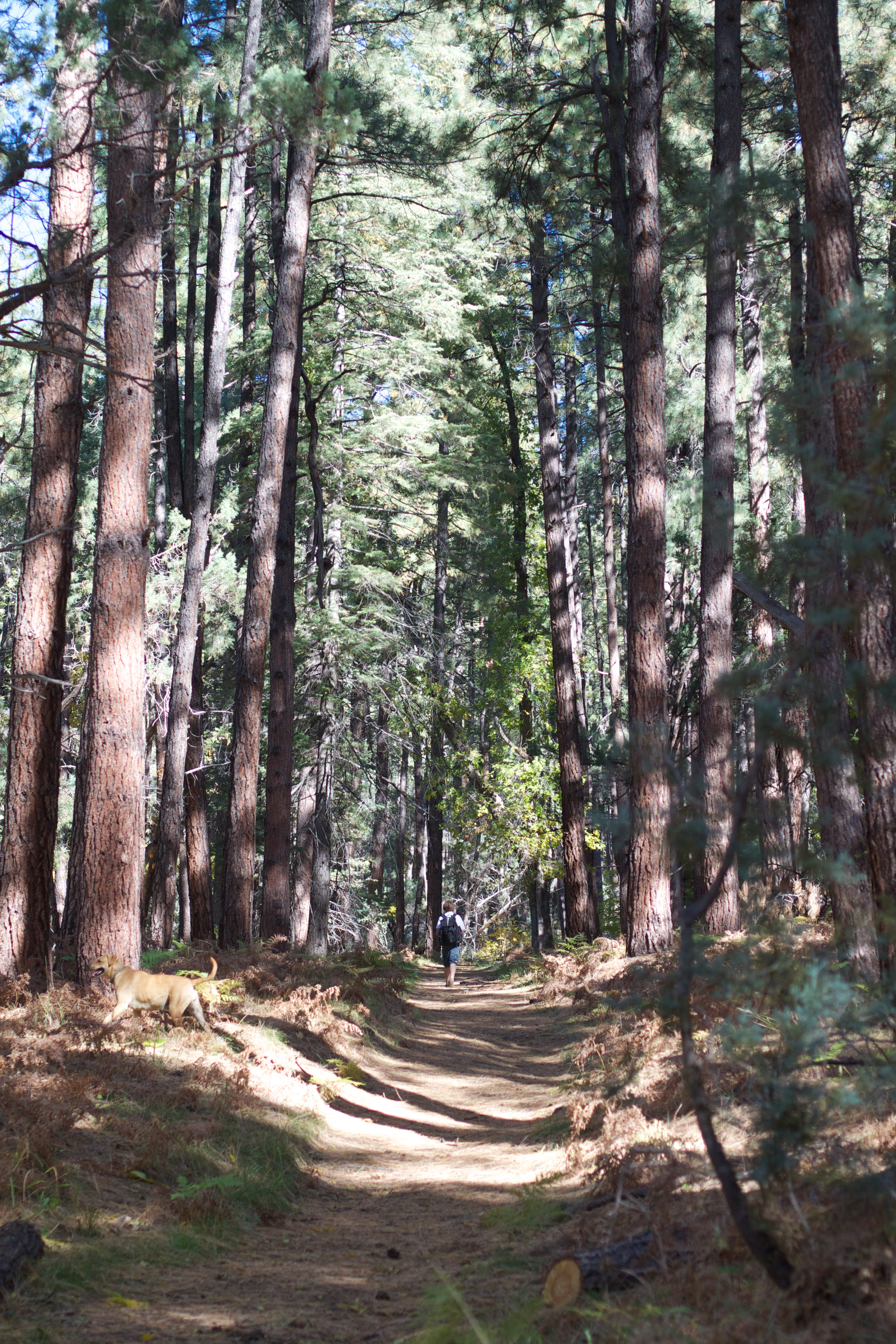
- Trail up Pine Canyon, in the Tonto National Forest

- Location in Gila County and the state of Arizona
- Coordinates: 34°23′4″N 111°27′18″W
- Country: United States
- State: Arizona
- County: Gila

Area
  - Total: 32.42 sq mi (83.97 km^{2})
  - Land: 32.41 sq mi (83.95 km^{2})
  - Water: 0.0077 sq mi (0.02 km^{2})
- Elevation: 5,367 ft (1,636 m)

Population (2020)
  - Total: 1,953
  - Density: 60.2/sq mi (23.26/km^{2})
- Time zone: UTC-7 (MST (no DST))
- ZIP code: 85544
- Area code: 928
- FIPS code: 04-55700
- GNIS feature ID: 32916

Pine is an unincorporated community and census-designated place (CDP) in Gila County, Arizona, United States. The population was 1,953 at the 2020 census. Pine was established by four Mormon families in 1879.

Pine and the adjacent community of Strawberry are rapidly growing vacation and retirement centers in north-central Arizona, below the Mogollon Rim. Pine's elevation is 5,369 feet (1,636 m), and the Pine post office was established in 1884.

== Geography ==
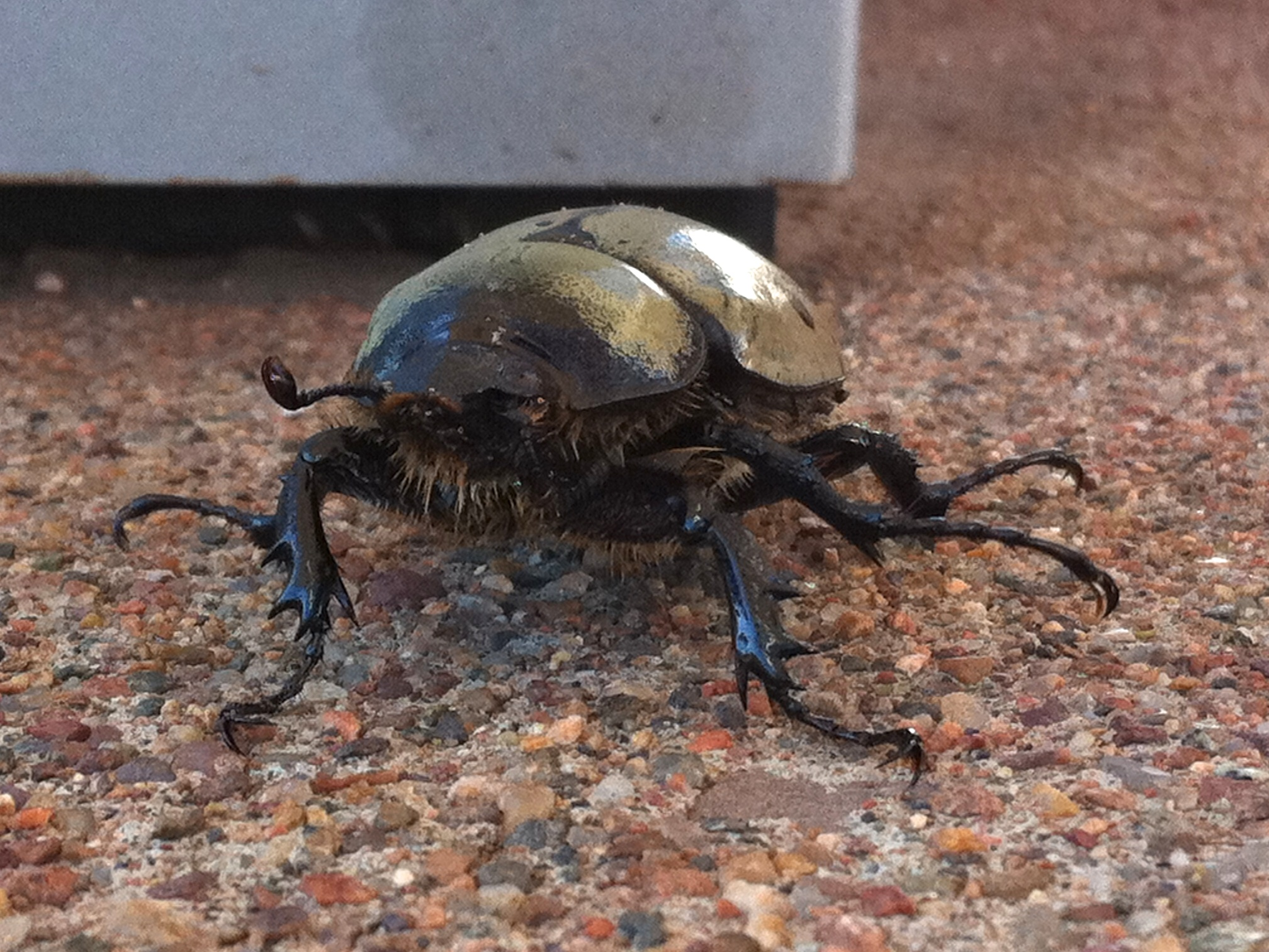
Large rhinoceros beetle at the Pine gas station. This is a common species along the Mogollon Rim.

Pine is located in northwestern Gila County at 34°23′6″N 111°27′28″W (34.385067, -111.457709). It is bordered to the north by the Coconino County line, which follows the edge of the Mogollon Rim. To the northwest, Pine is bordered by the community of Strawberry, also in Gila County. Arizona State Route 87 passes through Pine, leading northeast 74 miles (119 km) to Winslow and southeast 15 miles (24 km) to Payson.

According to the United States Census Bureau, the CDP has a total area of 32.4 square miles (84.0 km^{2}), of which 0.01 square miles (0.02 km^{2}), or 0.02%, is water. The built-up part of Pine is situated in the valley of Pine Creek, which flows past Tonto Natural Bridge to the East Verde River 10 miles (16 km) south of town.

== Demographics ==
Historical population
Census	Pop.	Note	%±
2000	1,931		—
2010	1,963		1.7%
2020	1,953		−0.5%
U.S. Decennial Census

=== 2020 census ===
As of the 2020 census, Pine had a population of 1,953. The median age was 63.6 years. 8.4% of residents were under the age of 18 and 46.6% of residents were 65 years of age or older. For every 100 females there were 92.0 males, and for every 100 females age 18 and over there were 92.3 males age 18 and over.

0.0% of residents lived in urban areas, while 100.0% lived in rural areas.

There were 1,016 households in Pine, of which 8.7% had children under the age of 18 living in them. Of all households, 52.3% were married-couple households, 20.8% were households with a male householder and no spouse or partner present, and 22.8% were households with a female householder and no spouse or partner present. About 34.5% of all households were made up of individuals and 20.5% had someone living alone who was 65 years of age or older.

There were 2,677 housing units, of which 62.0% were vacant. The homeowner vacancy rate was 3.4% and the rental vacancy rate was 13.8%.

Racial composition as of the 2020 census
Race	Number	Percent
White	1,740	89.1%
Black or African American	5	0.3%
American Indian and Alaska Native	35	1.8%
Asian	5	0.3%
Native Hawaiian and Other Pacific Islander	1	0.1%
Some other race	39	2.0%
Two or more races	128	6.6%
Hispanic or Latino (of any race)	103	5.3%

=== 2000 census ===
As of the 2000 census, there were 1,931 people, 882 households, and 604 families residing in the CDP. The population density was 60.8 inhabitants per square mile (23.5/km^{2}). There were 2,242 housing units at an average density of 70.6 per square mile (27.3/km^{2}). The racial makeup of the CDP was 96.9% White, 0.2% Black or African American, 0.5% Native American, 0.1% Asian, 1.1% from other races, and 1.2% from two or more races. 1.8% of the population were Hispanic or Latino of any race.

There were 882 households, out of which 15.2% had children under the age of 18 living with them, 61.2% were married couples living together, 5.8% had a female householder with no husband present, and 31.5% were non-families. 24.3% of all households were made up of individuals, and 9.2% had someone living alone who was 65 years of age or older. The average household size was 2.19 and the average family size was 2.57.

In the CDP, the population was spread out, with 16.6% under the age of 18, 3.0% from 18 to 24, 16.5% from 25 to 44, 41.0% from 45 to 64, and 22.9% who were 65 years of age or older. The median age was 53 years. For every 100 females, there were 99.1 males. For every 100 females age 18 and over, there were 95.4 males.

The median income for a household in the CDP was $40,099, and the median income for a family was $45,947. Males had a median income of $37,955 versus $34,167 for females. The per capita income for the CDP was $25,080. About 5.1% of families and 9.3% of the population were below the poverty line, including 21.3% of those under age 18 and 4.1% of those age 65 or over.

== See also ==
- List of historic properties in Pine-Strawberry, Arizona
- Fossil Creek
