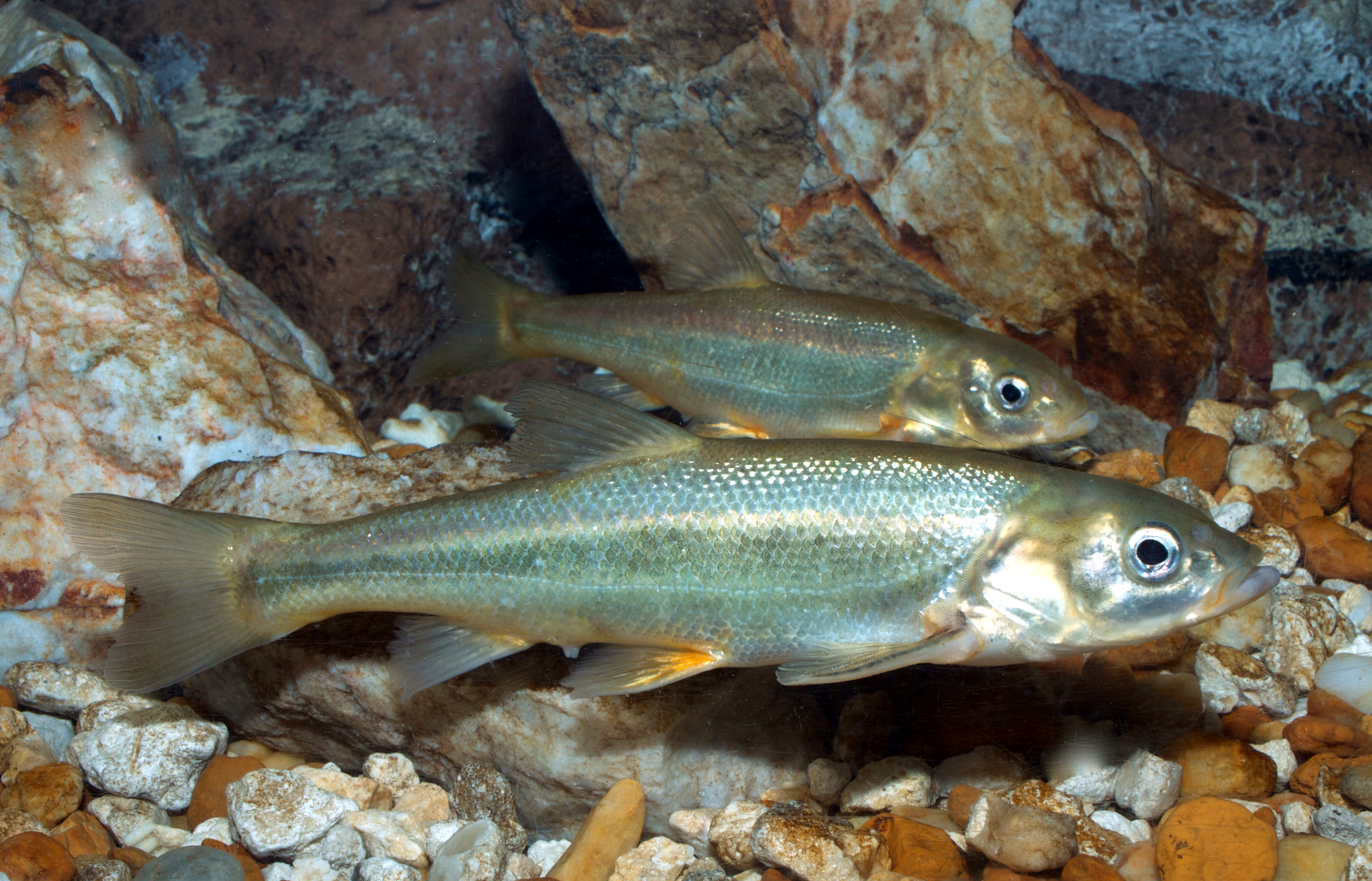

Conservation status
- Endangered (IUCN 3.1)

Scientific classification
- Kingdom: Animalia
- Phylum: Chordata
- Class: Actinopterygii
- Order: Cypriniformes
- Family: Leuciscidae
- Genus: Gila
- Species: G. intermedia

Binomial name
- Gila intermedia (Girard, 1856)

= Gila chub =

Species of fish

The Gila chub (Gila intermedia) is a species of ray-finned fish in the family Cyprinidae. It is found in Mexico and the United States. The Gila chub is closely related to the roundtail chub. This species is commonly found in association with the Gila topminnow, the desert and Sonora sucker, and the longfin and speckled dace.

== Description ==
The Gila chub has a large, chubby body, with large, thick scales. The body is dark overall, and sometimes is lighter on the belly. In larger females, a soft, fat, and broad hump sometimes develops on the nape of the neck. Mature, breeding males have a red or orange color on the lower cheek, back parts of the lips, and on parts of the fin. This coloration can also be found on the male's caudal peduncle (tail side). Males usually grow to be only about 15 cm (5.9 in), while females can reach to 25 cm (9.8 in)—a significant difference.

== Range ==
The Gila chub has been found in streams of the Gila River drainage in Arizona, and in the Santa Cruz River system in Sonora, Mexico; however, recently, the Gila chub species has not been documented in the San Pedro drainage in Sonora, Mexico.

The Gila chub has also been recently discovered in these specific drainages in Arizona: Santa Cruz River, Middle Gila River, San Pedro River, Agua Fria River, and the Verde River. These fish have also been extirpated from the Monkey Spring of the Santa Cruz River, and Fish and Cave Creeks of the Salt River.

== Habitat ==
Gila chub of the Gila River basin usually occupies the smaller headwater streams, springs or marshes. Their choice of diverse habitats varies, depending on the season or age of the fish. Juveniles are found in riffles (a patch of waves), pools, and banks. However, in larger streams, these fish are found in parts of heavy vegetation, for cover and foraging. Gila chubs are also considered to be highly "secretive" when it comes to habitats; since fish of this species are constantly looking for deeper waters near cover and shade.

== Diet ==
Gila chubs are omnivores, and their diet mainly includes aquatic (and terrestrial) insects. These fish are also known to consume other fish at large sizes, which include eating speckled dace (Rhinichthys osculus) and other small cyprinid fish. Juveniles feed throughout the day while the adults are out during the early morning and late night; juveniles usually consume insects and algae.

== Reproduction ==
Gila chub have a unique breeding season, which occurs from late spring to summer (some populations can go as far as late winter if the water temperature stays constant). The breeding period is long because Gila chub mature in their second or third year, and are more active at this age. Reproduction occurs in heavily vegetated areas. Actively breeding fish have distinct intense coloration—parts of the body become fire-red (ventro-lateral surfaces) and the eyes transform to a yellow-orange.

== Conservation ==
Little is known about the population of Gila chub in Mexico, but the populations that reside in Arizona are expected to decrease because of these ongoing threats: aquifer pumping, stream diversion, habitat alterations by non-native crayfishes, and mainly, predation/competition with nonnative fishes. Currently, the Gila chub are sharing the waters with green sunfish (Lepomis cyanellus) in many areas; however, introducing any other kind of exotic fish to the Gila chub must be managed and observed (it is crucial to their survival). In fact, the Gila chub has been extirpated on many occasions because of exotic fish such as the largemouth bass (Micropterus salmoides).

According to the Arizona Fish and Game Department, the Bureau of Land Management Phoenix District is proposing translocations of the Gila chub from Silver Creek to an adjacent stream in the Agua Fria headwaters. Here, the Arizona Game and Fish Department can complete their status review of warranting the Gila chub under the Endangered Species Act.
