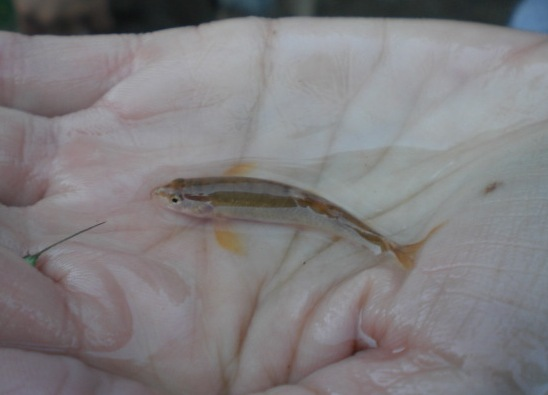

Conservation status
- Vulnerable (IUCN 3.1)

- Endangered (ESA)

Scientific classification
- Kingdom: Animalia
- Phylum: Chordata
- Class: Actinopterygii
- Order: Cypriniformes
- Family: Leuciscidae
- Subfamily: Pogonichthyinae
- Genus: Tiaroga; Girard, 1856
- Species: T. cobitis

Binomial name
- Tiaroga cobitis Girard, 1856

Synonyms
- Rhinichthys cobitis (Girard, 1856)

= Loach minnow =

Species of fish

The loach minnow (Tiaroga cobitis) is a species of freshwater ray-finned fish belonging to the family Leuciscidae, the shiners, daces and minnows. It is the only species in the monospecific genus Tiaroga. It occurs in streams and small rivers throughout the Gila River and San Pedro River systems in Arizona, New Mexico, and Sonora; it is now considered extinct in Mexico.

== Description ==
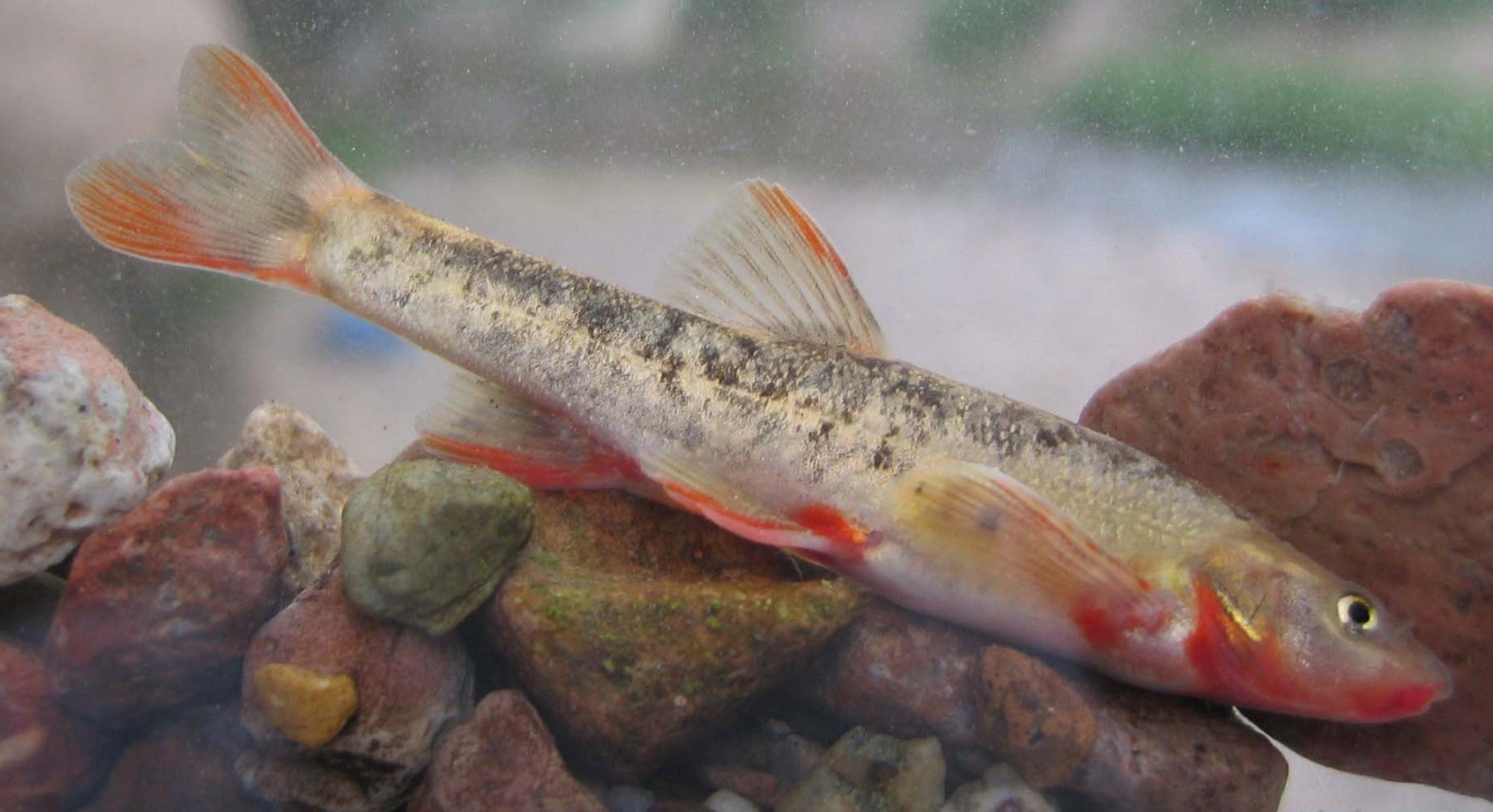
Male Loach minnow in breeding colors.

Loach minnow has an elongated, compressed body with its size rarely exceeding 65 mm (2.6 in) in length. This species have an olivaceous body, highly blotched with darker pigment. They have dirty-white spots before and behind base of dorsal fin, and on lower and upper sides base of caudal. Breeding males have vivid red-orange markings on bases of fins, body, and lower head. Breeding females become yellow on their fin and lower body. The loach minnow has whitish spots that are present on the origin and insertion of the dorsal fin as well as on the dorsal and ventral portions of the caudal fin base, this distinguishes the loach minnow from the similar Speckled dace for field identification.

== Biology ==
Loach minnows are short-lived fishes, depending on their environment and different characteristics of individual population. Spawning is observed to take place from late winter in early summer. Their eggs are deposited on the bottom of flattened rocks, and the number of eggs can range from 5 to more than 250 per rock, with average of 52 to 63 eggs per rock. A female can contain 150 to 1200 mature ova. Males turn red on their fins and above their mouths when they are ready to breed.

== Habitat and food ==
Loach minnows can be found at turbulent, rocky riffles of mainstream rivers. They prefer moderate to swift current velocity and gravel substrates. Members of this species are opportunistic benthic insectivores: they seek food at the bottom substrate for riffle-dwelling larval ephemeropterans, simuliid, and chironomid dipterans.

== Conservation ==
Loach minnow was proposed (USDI, Fish and Wildlife Service [USFWS] 1985) and subsequently listed (USFWS 1986) as a threatened species. Critical habitat was proposed (USFWS 1985) and took effect on April 7, 1994. The critical habitat designation was subject to controversy and litigation, causing it to be rescinded, redesignated and altered. In 2012, the loach minnow was declared "endangered" alongside the spikedace (Meda fulgida), with which it shares much of its range.
