= Strawberry, Arizona =

CDP in Gila County, Arizona

- Census-designated place
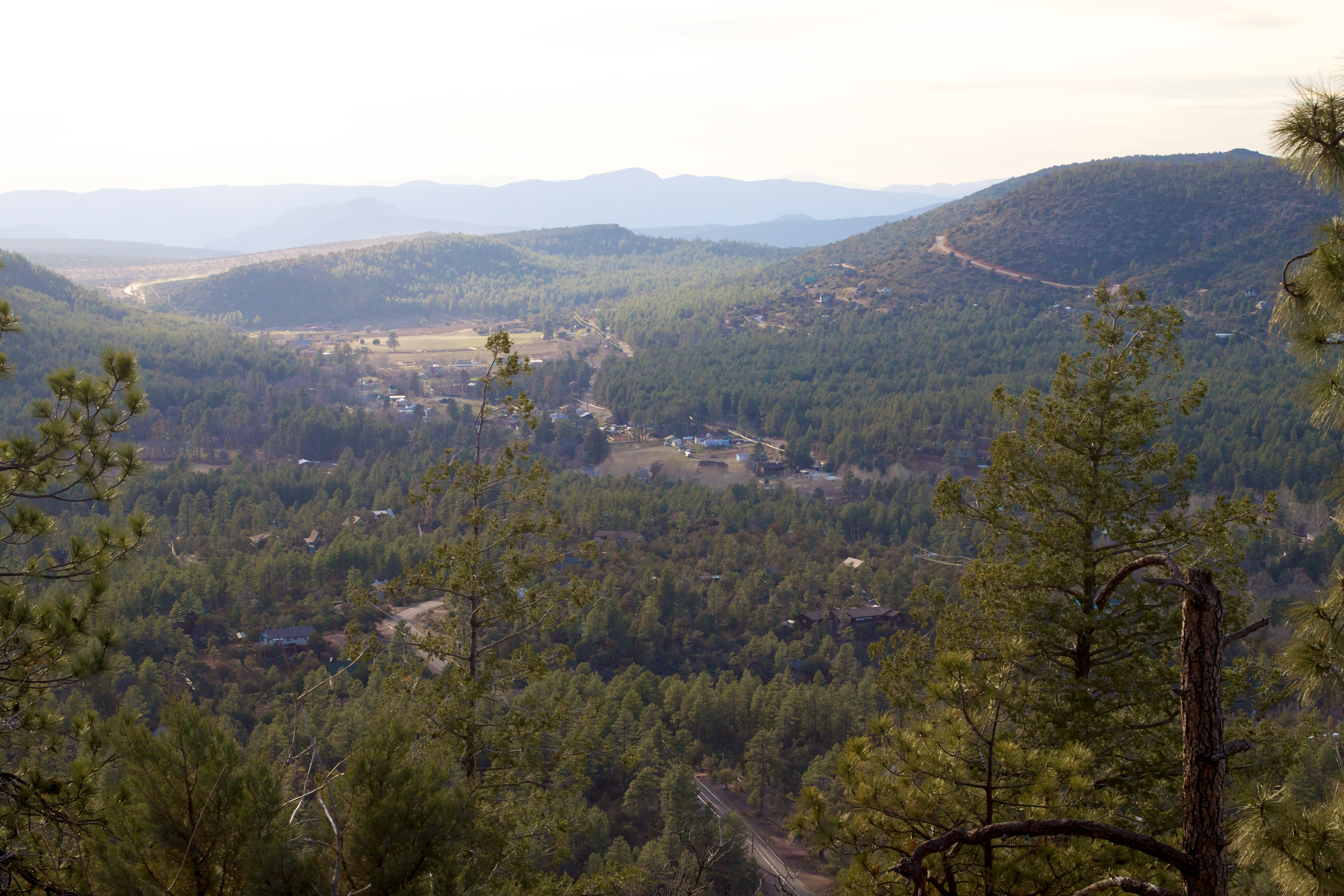
- View of Strawberry from atop Strawberry Mountain, 2011

- Location in Gila County and the state of Arizona

- Location in the United States
- Coordinates: 34°24′28″N 111°29′37″W
- Country: United States
- State: Arizona
- County: Gila

Area
  - Total: 11.53 sq mi (29.86 km^{2})
  - Land: 11.52 sq mi (29.84 km^{2})
  - Water: 0.0039 sq mi (0.01 km^{2})
- Elevation: 5,800 ft (1,800 m)

Population (2020)
  - Total: 943
  - Density: 82/sq mi (31.6/km^{2})
- Time zone: UTC-7 (MST (no DST))
- ZIP code: 85544
- Area code: 928
- FIPS code: 04-70040
- GNIS feature ID: 34888

Strawberry is an unincorporated community and census-designated place (CDP) in Gila County, Arizona, United States. The population was 961 at the 2010 census.

== History ==
In June 1931, the Bureau of Prohibition destroyed a large whiskey still in Sandrock Canyon, north of Strawberry. The still had an estimated worth of $20,000. Seven hundred gallons of "mountain whiskey" were destroyed and three men arrested.

== Geography ==
Strawberry is located in the northwest corner of Gila County at 34°24′28″N 111°29′37″W (34.4078063, -111.4934754). It is bordered to the south and east by Pine, and to the north by Coconino County. The county line follows the edge of the Mogollon Rim.

Arizona State Route 87 passes through Strawberry. It is a two-hour drive—108 miles (174 km)—northeast from Phoenix. The town of Payson is 18 miles (29 km) southeast via Route 87, and Winslow is 71 miles (114 km) to the northeast.

According to the United States Census Bureau, the Strawberry CDP has a total area of 9.5 square miles (24.5 km^{2}), of which 0.004 square miles (0.01 km^{2}), or 0.04%, is water. The community is in the valley of Strawberry Creek, part of the Verde River watershed.

== Demographics ==
Historical population
Census	Pop.	Note	%±
2000	1,028		—
2010	961		−6.5%
2020	943		−1.9%
U.S. Decennial Census

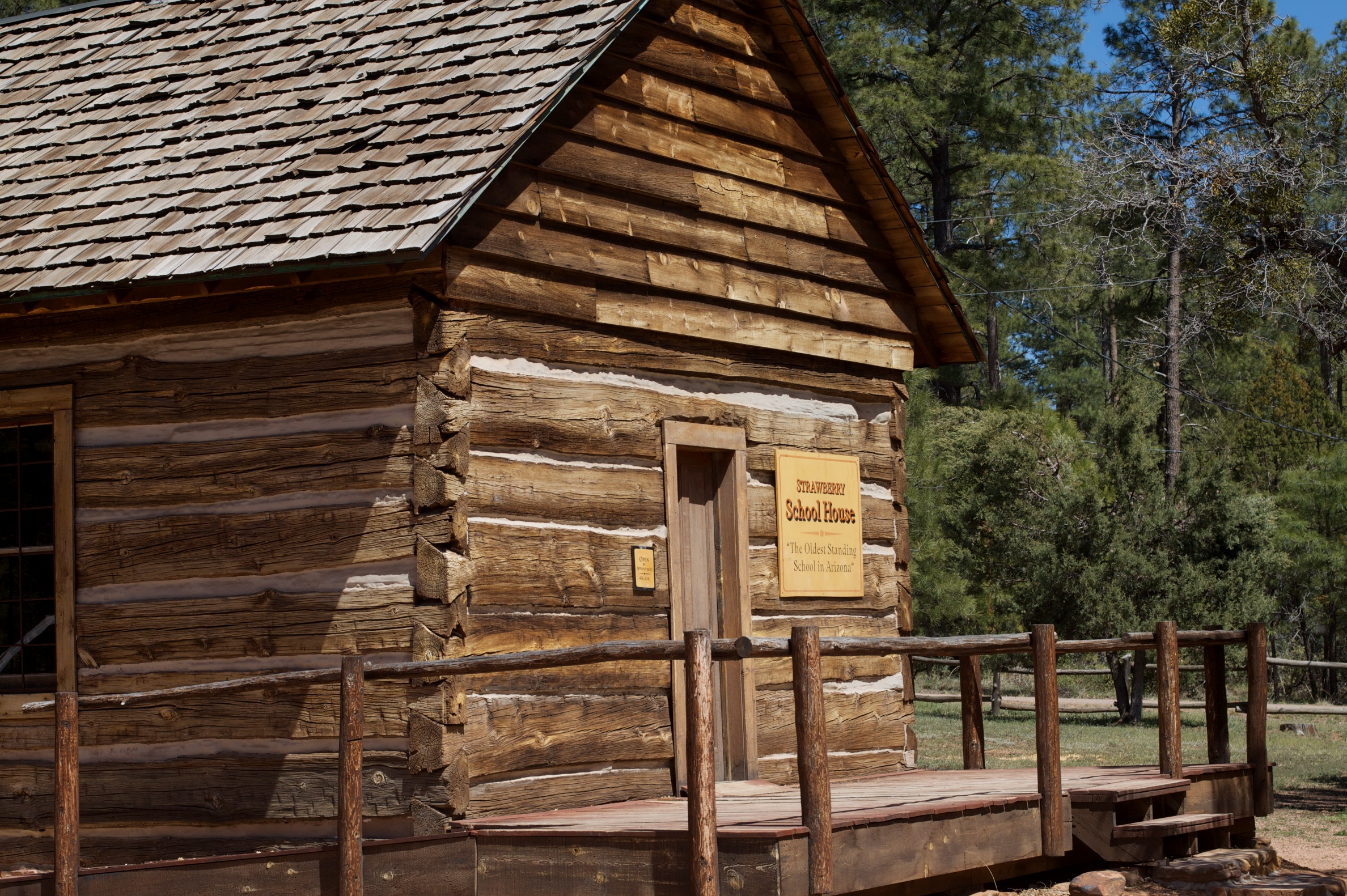
The Strawberry Schoolhouse, built in 1885 and added to the National Register of Historic Places in 2005.

As of the census of 2000, there were 1,028 people, 491 households, and 354 families residing in the CDP. The population density was 101.0 inhabitants per square mile (39.0/km^{2}). There were 1,165 housing units at an average density of 114.5 per square mile (44.2/km^{2}). The racial makeup of the CDP was 96.7% White, 0.1% Black or African American, 0.6% Native American, 0.7% Asian, 1.0% from other races, and 1.0% from two or more races. Hispanic or Latino of any race were 3.1% of the population.

There were 491 households, out of which 14.9% had children under the age of 18 living with them, 64.6% were married couples living together, 4.9% had a female householder with no husband present, and 27.7% were non-families. 24.4% of all households were made up of individuals, and 11.6% had someone living alone who was 65 years of age or older. The average household size was 2.09 and the average family size was 2.44.

In the CDP, the population was spread out, with 13.4% under the age of 18, 2.9% from 18 to 24, 17.1% from 25 to 44, 40.6% from 45 to 64, and 26.0% who were 65 years of age or older. The median age was 54 years. For every 100 females, there were 96.6 males. For every 100 females age 18 and over, there were 95.2 males.

The median income for a household in the CDP was $35,739, and the median income for a family was $42,279. Males had a median income of $38,125 versus $26,389 for females. The per capita income for the CDP was $21,609. About 6.9% of families and 10.8% of the population were below the poverty line, including 25.2% of those under age 18 and 1.5% of those age 65 or over.

== Education ==
It is in the Pine Strawberry Elementary School District.

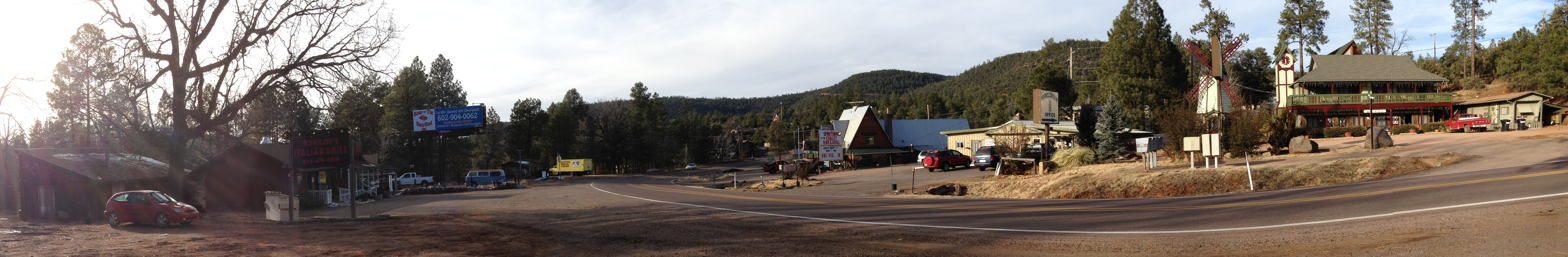
Strawberry in 2014

== See also ==
- List of historic properties in Pine-Strawberry, Arizona
- Fossil Creek
