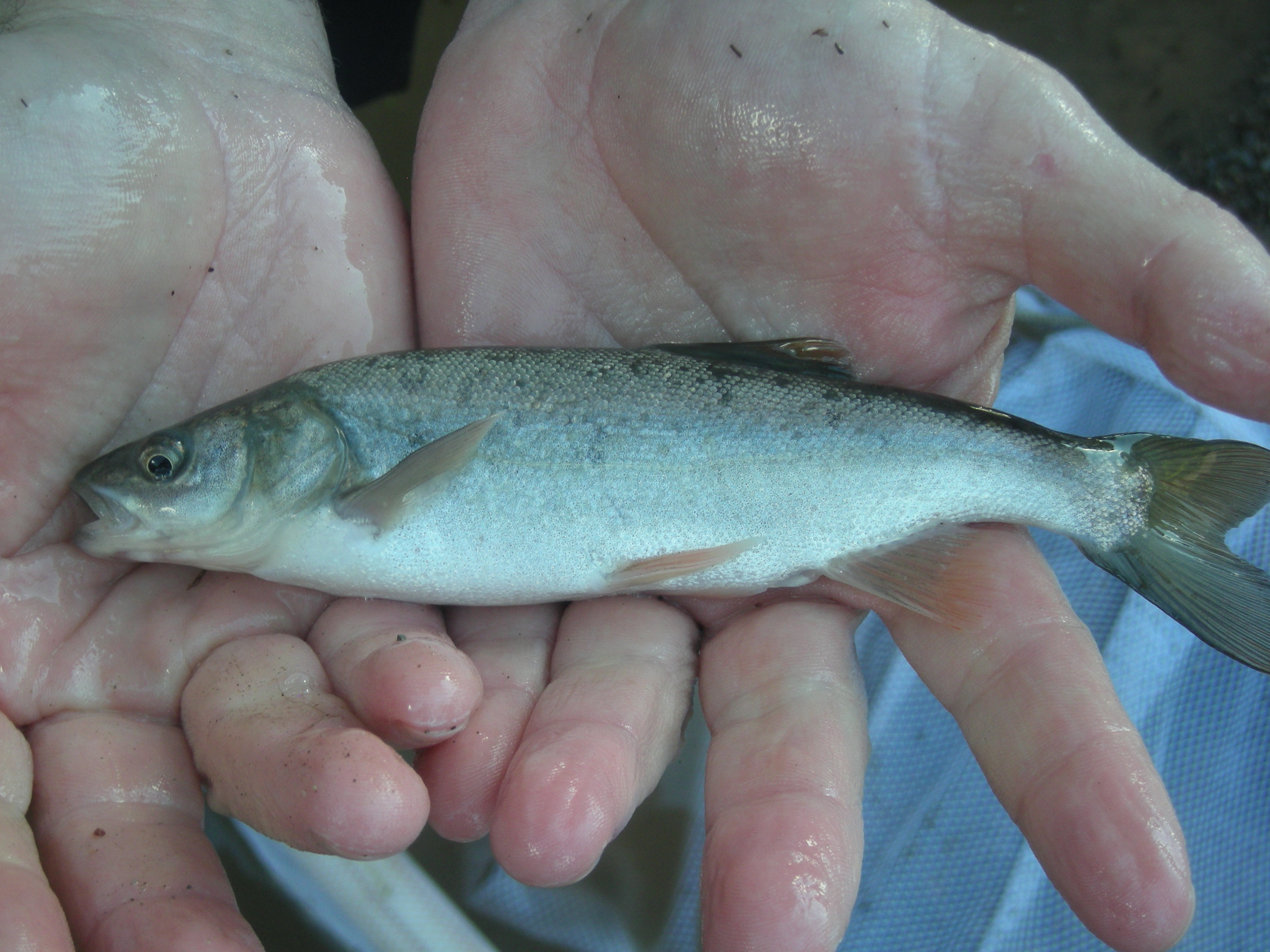

Conservation status
- Vulnerable (IUCN 3.1)

Scientific classification
- Kingdom: Animalia
- Phylum: Chordata
- Class: Actinopterygii
- Order: Cypriniformes
- Family: Leuciscidae
- Genus: Gila
- Species: G. robusta

Binomial name
- Gila robusta Baird & Girard, 1853

Synonyms
- Gila emoryi Baird & Girard, 1853; Gila gracilis Baird & Girard, 1853; Guila grahami Baird & Girard, 1853; Gila elegans Baird & Girard, 1854; Gila gibboda Baird & Girard, 1854; Tigoma intermedia Girard, 1856; Ptychocheilus vorax Girard, 1856; Gila affinis Abbott, 1860; Leuciscus zunnensis Günther, 1868; Gila nacrea Cope, 1874; Gila nigra Cope, 1875; Squalius lemmoni Smith, 1884

= Roundtail chub =

Roundtail chub Temporal range: Pliocene to present

Species of fish

The roundtail chub (Gila robusta) is a species of freshwater ray-finned fish belonging to the family Leuciscidae, which includes the daces, chubs, Eurasian minnows and related species. This species is found in southwestern North America. It is native to the Colorado River drainage basin, including the Gila River and other tributaries, and in several other rivers. It is part of the "robusta complex", which includes the Gila robusta robusta, G.r. grahami, and G.r. seminuda.

== Evolution ==
A partial articulated fossil skeleton of a Gila chub, tentatively assigned to Gila robusta, has been recovered from the middle Pliocene-aged Bidahochi Formation of Arizona. This suggests that the Colorado River had already developed its iconic swift-river habitat by this point in time.

== Description ==
The body of the roundtail chub is significantly larger forward of the dorsal fin, and posteriorly it is tapered towards the tail. The forehead area is concave. The mouth is largish, but does not reach as far as the pupil of the eye, and is overhung by the snout. The tail is deeply forked. Color is a grayish brown above, and a lighter shade below. Mature males sometimes acquire red-orange lower cheeks and paired fins during breeding season. Roundtail chub can reach almost 49 cm (19.5 in), but usually only grow to about 25–30 cm (10–12 in). Recently, it has been recorded at up to 43 cm (17 in) in length.
Roundtail chub are also described to be "trout-like" because they possess a large mouth with the lower lip outlined in black. However, they lack the adipose fins found on trout species.

== Range ==
Its range of is within the Colorado River drainage basin, found from the headwaters down to the mouth, in Utah, Colorado, Arizona, Nevada, and California, and northwest Mexico; as well as in other rivers of northwestern Mexico.

This species is rather variable, and formerly accounted as several species, until intermediate forms were discovered. Recognized subspecies include:

- Gila robusta grahami
- Gila robusta jordani - small streams along the White River (Nevada)
- Gila robusta robusta - small rivers
- Gila robusta seminuda

The roundtail chub has been extirpated from the Zuni and San Francisco Rivers of New Mexico.

In Arizona, specifically in Gila, Mohave, and Yavapai Counties, the roundtail chub occupies several tributaries: Fossil Creek, Oak Creek, Burro Creek, Francis Creek, Big Sandy River, Santa Maria River, Boulder Creek, Trout Creek, Sycamore Creek, Beaverhead Springs, and throughout the Verde River. It is also found in the Gila River and the Rio Yaqui.

== Biology ==
Roundtail chub is very prolific in nature.

=== Diet ===
Roundtail chub is a voracious predator, consuming large amounts of fish, crayfish, frogs, and insects. Roundtail chub adults primarily consume aquatic and terrestrial insects, other fishes, and sometimes algae. Roundtail chub juveniles eat smaller insects, crustaceans, and algae.

== Conservation ==
The decreasing population of the roundtail chub is primarily the result of habitat loss as well as predation and competition by non-native fish. Although the populations in the Salt and Verde Rivers were stable ten years ago, they have been exponentially decreasing. Recent conservation efforts include more research to determine the mechanisms of their sudden disappearance, and population surveys conducted by the Arizona Game and Fish and US Forest Service (in progress).

Arizona Game and Fish Department considers roundtail chub a sport fish. They put up a strong fight for anglers, and the meat is described as "firm, white and very mild tasting." Intermuscular bones or floating bones are present, which can be cut out prior to cooking.

It is a candidate endangered species of the United States Fish and Wildlife Service, under the Endangered Species Act criteria. Gila robusta jordani and Gila seminuda are recognized as endangered species under the Endangered Species Act.
