= Verde River =

Perennial stream in central Arizona, US

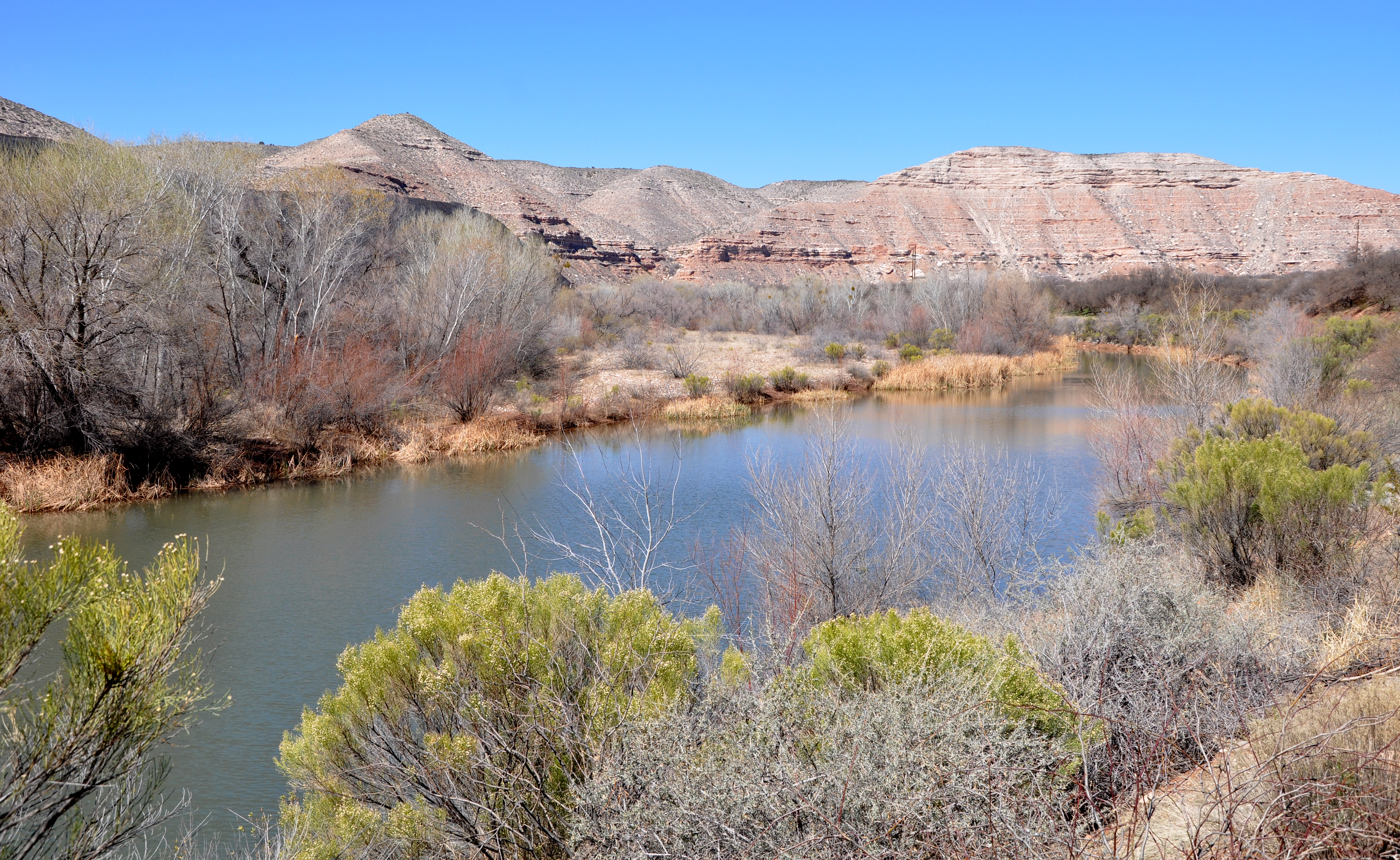
- Near Clarkdale along Sycamore Canyon Road

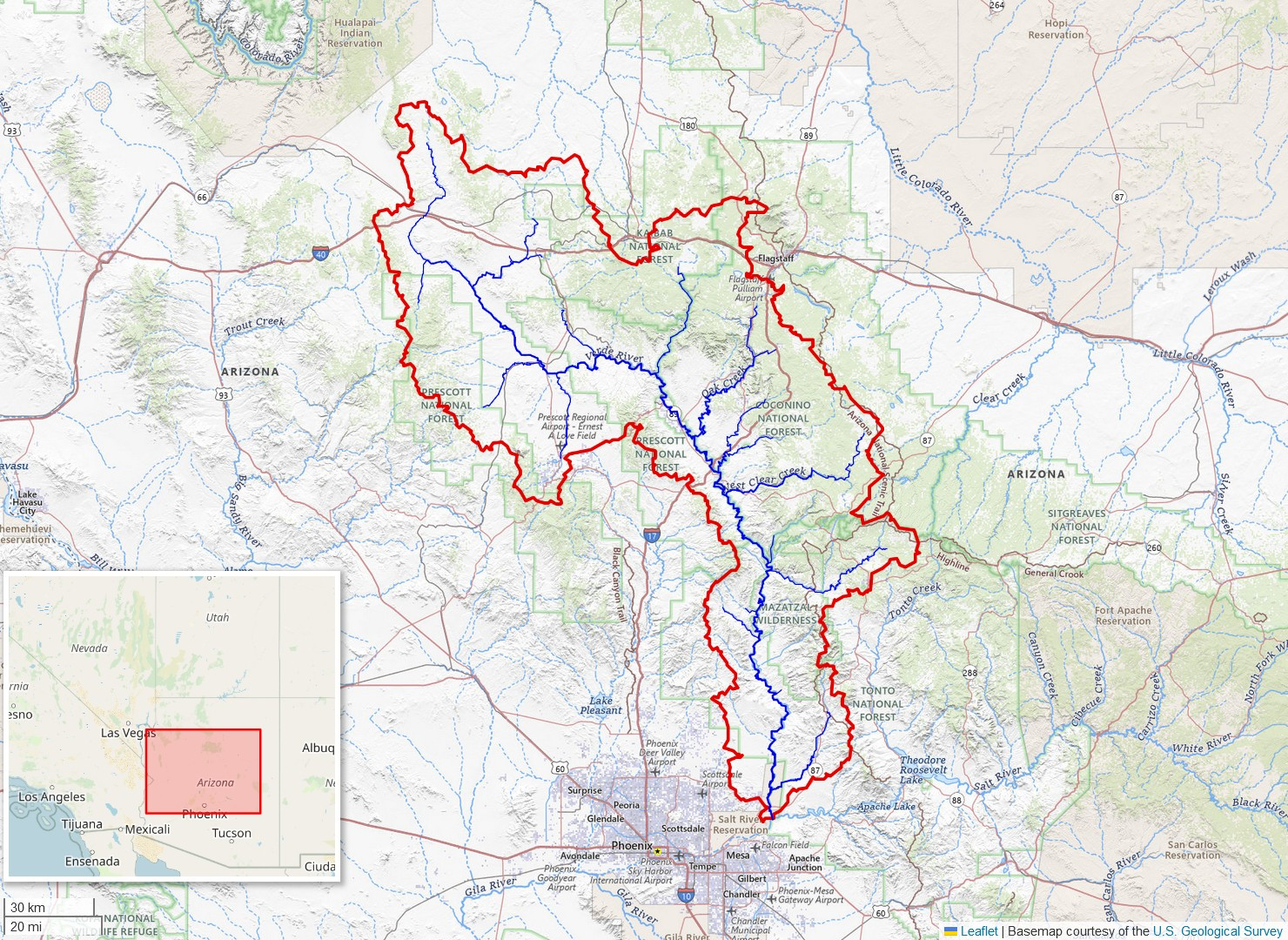
- Verde River watershed (Interactive map)
- Native name: Haka'he:la (Yavapai)

Location
- Country: United States
- State: Arizona
- County: Yavapai, Gila, Maricopa

Physical characteristics
- Source: Sullivan Lake
  - location: near Paulden, Yavapai County
  - coordinates: 34°51′50″N 112°27′39″W
  - elevation: 4,354 ft (1,327 m)
- Mouth: Salt River
  - location: near Fountain Hills, Maricopa County
  - coordinates: 33°32′49″N 111°39′38″W
  - elevation: 1,325 ft (404 m)
- Length: 170 mi (270 km)
- Basin size: 6,615 mi^{2} (17,130 km^{2})
- Discharge
  - location: near Scottsdale, 1 mile (1.6 km) from the mouth
  - average: 602 cu ft/s (17.0 m^{3}/s)
  - minimum: 0 cu ft/s (0 m^{3}/s)
  - maximum: 127,000 cu ft/s (3,600 m^{3}/s)

Basin features
- Tributaries
  - left: Sycamore Creek, Oak Creek, Wet Beaver Creek, West Clear Creek, Fossil Creek, East Verde River
  - right: Granite Creek

National Wild and Scenic River
- Type: Wild, Scenic
- Designated: August 28, 1984

The Verde River (Yavapai: Haka'he:la) is a major tributary of the Salt River in the U.S. state of Arizona. It is about 170 miles (270 km) long and carries a mean flow of 602 cubic feet per second (17.0 m^{3}/s) at its mouth. It is one of the largest perennial streams in Arizona.

== Description ==
The river begins below the dam at Sullivan Lake, fed by Big Chino Wash and Williamson Valley Wash in Yavapai County. The Verde flows freely for 125 miles (201 km) through private, state, tribal and United States Forest Service lands, specifically the Prescott National Forest, Coconino National Forest and Tonto National Forest, before encountering the first of two dams that make Horseshoe Lake and Bartlett Lake. The cities of Camp Verde, Clarkdale and Cottonwood are the main population centers along the river. The Verde River and the Salt River converge on the Salt River Pima-Maricopa Indian Community. The Salt River flows into the Gila River west of Phoenix.

In 1984, the United States Congress designated 40.5 miles (65.2 km) of the Verde River as Wild and Scenic through the National Wild and Scenic River program. The Scenic portion begins at Beasley Flats and extends downstream about 19 miles (31 km) to the northern boundary of the Mazatzal Wilderness. The Wild portion extends from there to the mouth of Red Creek, about 22 miles (35 km) further downstream.

In 1986, a 6-mile (10 km) stretch of the river was identified by the state of Arizona as a critical natural resource. This reach of the Verde River and its associated riparian zone, between the town of Clarkdale (near Tuzigoot National Monument) and the Bridgeport State Route 89A Bridge, became part of the Arizona State Parks system. The park, called the Verde River Greenway State Natural Area, encompasses 480 acres (190 ha). Dead Horse Ranch State Park, near Cottonwood, is adjacent to the Greenway.

At Drake, Arizona, its canyon is termed "Hell Canyon", and it is spanned by the Hell Canyon Bridge, a road bridge built in 1923, and listed on the National Register of Historic Places.

== Flora and fauna ==
Plants found in riparian zones along the river include ailanthus, Arizona alder, sycamore, cottonwood, walnut trees; a variety of willows; reeds, cattails, box elder, and saltcedar, among others. Aquatic vertebrates along the Verde River include North American beaver, belted kingfishers, great blue herons, otters, Chiricahua leopard frogs, Sonoran mud turtles, and others. Among the 27 species of fish found in the river are carp, flathead catfish, roundtail chub, Gila chub, bass, desert sucker, mosquitofish, red shiner, and Sonora sucker.

Beaver were trapped "with considerable success" on the Verde River by fur trappers led by Ewing Young, and including Kit Carson, dating to 1829. Edgar Alexander Mearns wrote in his 1907 naturalist survey Mammals of the Mexican Boundary of the United States that beaver were present on nearly all streams of the Colorado Basin. Re-introductions of beaver in recent times have transformed even small desert streams into robust riparian habitat, increasing species abundance and diversity.

== Recreation ==
Floating the Verde River in rafts and kayaks is a popular pastime as it runs through scenic valleys and the Mazatzal Wilderness. The facilities described below are maintained by the Tonto National Forest authority. Kayak rentals, shuttles, boating gear and services are available in Clarkdale, Cottonwood and Camp Verde. Several commercial outfitters offer guided trips on the Verde River. Popular stretches for commercial boating include the Verde River at Clarkdale, beginning at the Lower TAPCO River Access Point (RAP) and floating to the Tuzigoot RAP in Clarkdale; Skidmore RAP to Black Canyon RAP or Bignotti RAP on the Prescott National Forest between Cottonwood and Camp Verde; and White Bridge RAP to Clear Creek RAP or Beasley Flat RAP on the Prescott National Forest below Camp Verde.

=== Sport fishing ===
The Verde River above Camp Verde has about 70 miles (110 km) of fishable waters at an average elevation of 3,800 feet (1,200 m) above sea level. The nearest town with fuel, restaurants, lodging, groceries, and fishing tackle is Cottonwood. Fish species frequenting this stretch of the river include largemouth bass, redeye bass, sunfish, channel catfish, flathead catfish, yellow perch, chub, carp, and, in winter, rainbow trout. Crayfish and bullfrogs are also found.

From Camp Verde to Horseshoe Lake, about 60 miles (97 km) of fishable waters are at an average elevation of 2,800 feet (850 m). The nearest town with fuel and other supplies and amenities is Camp Verde. Species along this stretch include largemouth and smallmouth bass, sunfish, channel and flathead catfish, carp, crayfish, and bullfrogs.

The same species that are found between Camp Verde and Horseshoe Lake are also present along a 12-mile (19 km) stretch of the river from Horseshoe Lake to Bartlett Lake. The elevation along this stretch averages 1,800 feet (550 m) above sea level. The nearest town with fuel and supplies is Carefree.

Below Bartlett Lake, the elevation averages 1,500 feet (460 m) over the next 20 miles (32 km). Species here include largemouth bass, sunfish, channel and flathead catfish, tilapia, carp, crayfish, and bullfrogs. The nearest town with fuel and supplies is Fountain Hills.

== See also ==
- List of National Wild and Scenic Rivers
- List of rivers of Arizona
- List of tributaries of the Colorado River

== Works cited ==
- Arizona Fishin' Holes: The Arizona Game and Fish Department's Guide to Public Fishing Waters and Facilities in Arizona (2010). Phoenix: Arizona Game and Fish Department.
- Benke, Arthur C., ed., and Cushing, Colbert E., ed.; Blinn, Dean W. and Poff, N. Leroy (2005). "Chapter 11: Colorado River Basin" in Rivers of North America. Burlington, Massachusetts: Elsevier Academic Press. ISBN 0-12-088253-1. OCLC 59003378.
