= Deer (disambiguation) =

Deer are ruminant mammals forming the family Cervidae.

Deer may also refer to:

== Animals ==
- Mouse-deer
- Musk deer, several species that make up Moschus

== People ==
- Deer (given name), a Native American given name
- Deer (surname), a surname

== Places ==
- Deer Creek (disambiguation)
- Deer Hill (disambiguation)
- Deer Island (disambiguation)
- Deer Lake (disambiguation)
- Deer Mountain (disambiguation)
- Deer Pond (disambiguation)
- Deer River (disambiguation)

=== Scotland ===
- Deer Abbey, Buchan
- New Deer, a village in Aberdeenshire
- Old Deer, another village in Aberdeenshire

=== United States ===
- Deer, Missouri, a community
- Deer Falls, Washington
- Deer Township, Roseau County, Minnesota

== Other uses ==
- Deer Jet, one of the subsidiaries of Hainan Airlines group
- The Deer (film), an Iranian film
- Great Wall Deer, a Chinese pick-up

== See also ==
- Deers (disambiguation)
- Deere, as in John Deere
