= Deer Island =

Deer Island may refer to:

== Canada ==
- Deer Island, Bonavista Bay, Newfoundland and Labrador
- Deer Island (New Brunswick)
- Deer Island (Kivalliq Region), Nunavut
- Qikiqtaarjuk, formerly Deer Island, Qikiqtaaluk Region, Nunavut

== United States ==
- Deer Island (Alaska Panhandle), Alaska
- Deer Island (Aleutian Islands), Alaska
- Deer Island (Arizona and California)
- Deer Island (Marin County), California
- Deer Isle, Maine
- Deer Island (Massachusetts)
  - Deer Island Prison
  - Deer Island Waste Water Treatment Plant
- Deer Island (Amesbury, Massachusetts)
- Deer Island (Mississippi)
- Deer Island (Thousand Islands), New York
- Deer Island, Oregon

== Other places ==
- Deer Island (Ireland)
- Eilean an Fheidh ('Deer Island'), Scotland

== See also ==
- Deer Island Lake, Michigan, United States
- Île aux Cerfs ('Deer Isle'), Mauritius
- Cerf Island, Seychelles
- Jura, Scotland
- North Deer Island (Texas)
