= Salt River Project =

Utilities provider in Arizona, US

- Company type: Association: Utility cooperative District: Government-owned corporation
- Industry: Public utility
- Founded: February 7, 1903
- Headquarters: Tempe, Arizona, United States
- Products: Electricity; Water
- Revenue: ▲US$4.02 billion (FY2023)
- Operating income: ▼US$292 million (FY2023)
- Net income: ▼US$362 million (FY2023)
- Number of employees: 5,123 (FY2023)
- Website: www.srpnet.com

The Salt River Project (SRP) is the umbrella name for two separate entities: the Salt River Project Agricultural Improvement and Power District, an agency of the state of Arizona that serves as an electrical utility for the Phoenix metropolitan area, and the Salt River Valley Water Users' Association, a utility cooperative that serves as the primary water provider for much of central Arizona. It is one of the primary public utility companies in Arizona.

SRP is not related to the Rio Salado Project (Rio Salado is Spanish for Salt River), a series of improvement projects along the Salt River through the Phoenix Metropolitan Area.

== Service territory ==
SRP serves large portions of the Phoenix metropolitan area. Much of its electric service area is shared with Arizona Public Service.

== Governance ==
Each company of SRP is governed separately.

For the Association, landowners elect a president, a vice president, a 10-member board of governors and 30 council members.

For the District, landowners elect a president, a vice president, a 14-member board of directors and 30 council members.

In practice, candidates seek election to both Councils or both Boards; as a result, the Association’s and the District’s rosters of officials are similar to each other.

The officials of each organization are elected on the first Tuesday in April of even-numbered years. The last scheduled Association and District elections were held on April 7, 2026. Both are elected by all landowners in the SRP service area through a "debt-proportionate" system. For instance, a person who owns five acres casts five votes. However, four of the District’s Directors are elected at-large, in a one-landowner-one-vote system.

== History ==
The Hohokam, the ancestors of the Salt River Pima-Maricopa Indian and Gila River Indian communities, built canals spanning nearly 500 miles. The SRP canal system follows much of the ancient canal network.

Early settlers in Phoenix and nearby areas were forced to rely on the flow of the Salt River to sustain agricultural activities. The river was prone to both floods and droughts and proved to be a less than reliable resource for the settlers. Failed plans to build a dam on the river in 1897, combined with a series of droughts, heightened the need for controlling the river.

With the passage of the National Reclamation Act of 1902, funding for reclamation projects with low-interest government loans paved the way for the creation of the Salt River Valley Water Users' Association the following year. Over 200,000 acres (81,000 ha) of private land belonging to the ranchers and farmers in the association were pledged for collateral and the association was officially incorporated February 7, 1903, becoming the first multipurpose project started under the reclamation act. Following on March 14, 1903, this project was one of the first five reclamation projects approved, under the Act, by the Secretary of the Interior. Construction on the Roosevelt Dam would commence the following year.

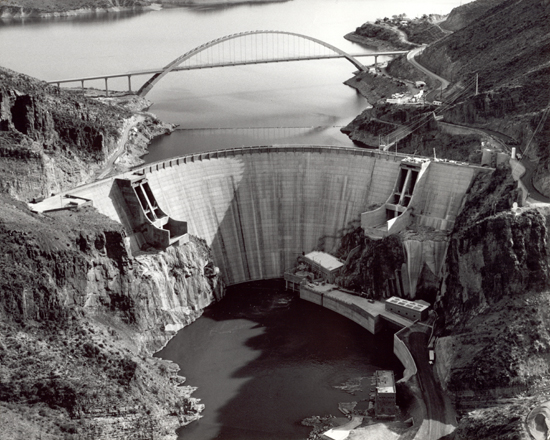
The original Roosevelt Dam, completed in 1911 was, at that time, the highest masonry dam ever built. In 1996, it was upgraded by encasing the original construction in new concrete (shown).

Although the construction of dams was the association's most visible and costly project, an integral part of the effort was also the construction and improvement of a system of canals designed to distribute the water from the Salt River among the various members living in the valley.

Hydroelectricity was produced at the dam site during construction, and used for the manufacture of cement and other purposes. In 1906 (before the dam was completed) electricity began to be produced from a hydroelectric generator within the dam. Almost all of the electricity not needed for agriculture, including the majority of that used in Phoenix, was sold to PG&E under an agreement that prohibited the United States Bureau of Reclamation from selling retail electricity within the city.

In 1936, the Arizona Legislature allowed for the creation of governmental districts that could finance large-scale agricultural projects with tax-free bonds. Shortly thereafter, the Salt River Project Agricultural Improvement and Power District was created, the second half of SRP. Over the next several decades, a series of major improvements along the Salt and Verde rivers would raise the number of reservoirs in the district to six, and at the same time SRP was constructing and maintaining a number of other electrical generating stations throughout the state.

As of 2007, SRP owns or operates eleven electrical generating stations, seven hydroelectric plants, and has energy purchasing agreements with four major hydroelectric stations along the Colorado River, making them a major provider of electric service in the Phoenix area. Along with the six reservoirs along the Salt and Verde rivers, SRP operates dams at the Blue Ridge Reservoir as well as the Granite Reef Diversion Dam and a number of canals, making the SRP a major provider of water to the Phoenix area.

== Salt River reservoirs ==
SRP owns and operates four reservoirs along the Salt River east of Phoenix. The main function of these reservoirs is to serve as water storage for the Phoenix metropolitan area, with a total capacity of 3,292,054 acre feet.

These reservoirs also serve as important recreational centers. The lakes are regularly stocked with fish, and are supplied with boat ramps for both angling and other watersports.

=== Theodore Roosevelt Lake ===
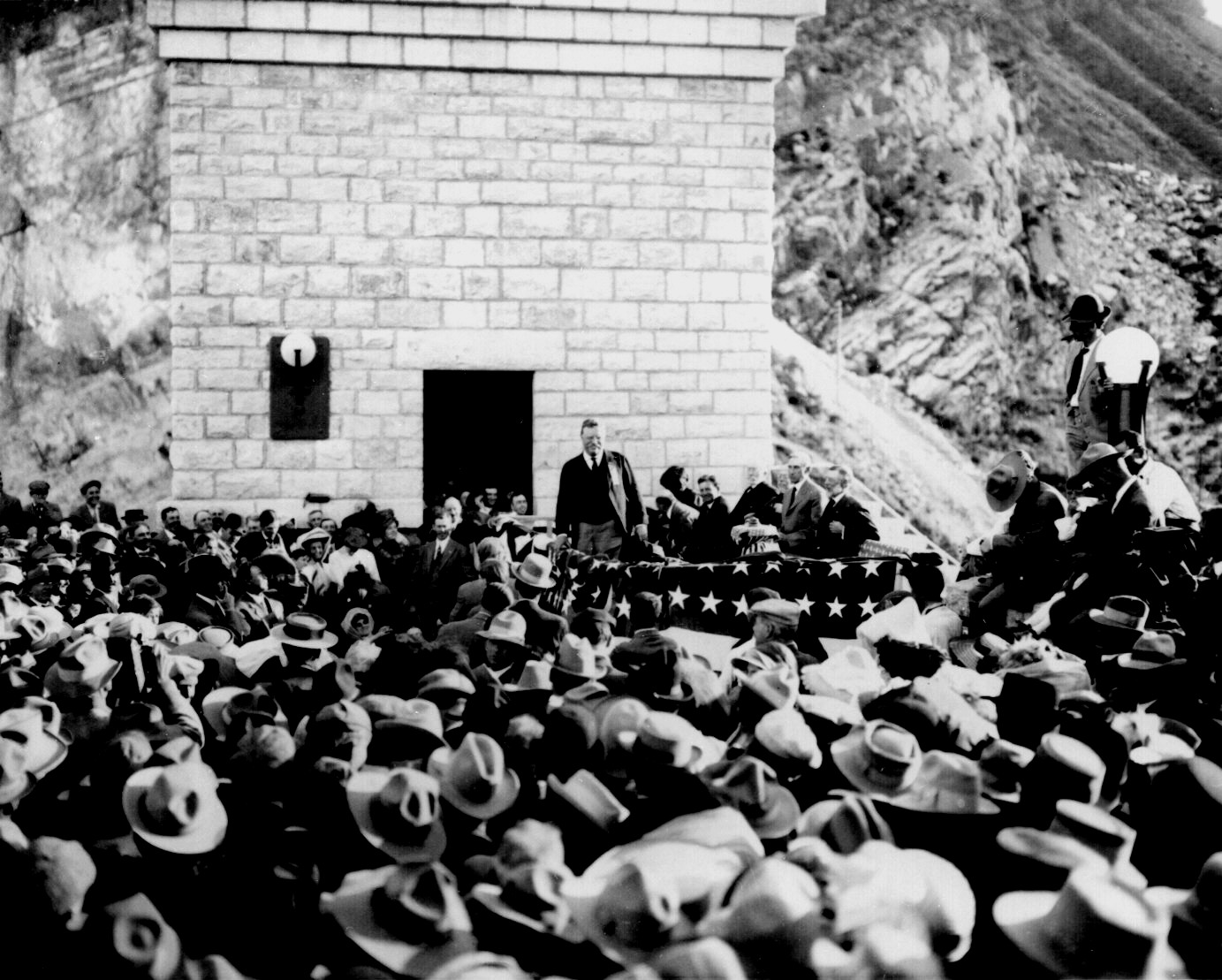
Dedication ceremonies of Roosevelt Dam (Arizona Territory), Col. Roosevelt speaking, March 18, 1911.

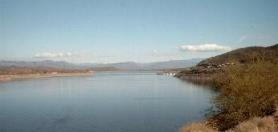
Lake Roosevelt, Arizona

Theodore Roosevelt Dam and the Roosevelt Lake it forms are considered perhaps the crowning achievements of SRP. With the initial funds raised by the association in 1903, an ambitious project was begun several miles east of Phoenix in the Tonto Valley, at the confluence of the Tonto Creek and the Salt River. At its completion in 1911, Roosevelt Dam was the tallest masonry dam in the world at 280 feet (85 m). It was dedicated by U.S. President Theodore Roosevelt, for whom the dam and the reservoir are named.

In 1996, a massive expansion project aimed at increasing the capacity of the lake was finished. The dam was resurfaced with concrete and raised an additional 77 feet (23 m), which had the effect of increasing the lake's capacity by over 20%, and providing much needed flood control space on the Salt River. Shortly after completion, however, the area entered into a prolonged period of drought, and it would be some time before the new capacity was used, with the lake finally reaching historic levels of 90% capacity in early 2005.

With an at-capacity surface area of nearly 21,500 acres (8,700 ha), Roosevelt is the largest lake that is wholly inside the state of Arizona. It can store 2,910,200 acre-feet (3.5897×10^{9} m^{3}) of water at capacity.

=== Apache Lake ===
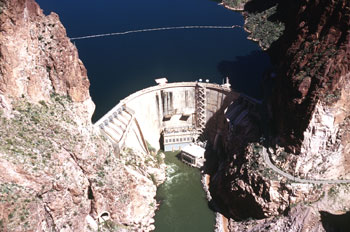
Horse Mesa Dam and Apache Lake

Apache Lake was formed by the construction of the Horse Mesa Dam, finished in 1927. Several miles downstream from Roosevelt, the dam stands 300 feet (91 m) high. The lake itself is considerably smaller than Roosevelt at only 2,600 acres (1,100 ha) of surface area at full capacity, and can store 254,138 acre-feet (313,475,000 m^{3}) of water.

Like the rest of the Salt River lakes downstream from Roosevelt, Apache Lake is long and narrow, filling the bottom of the canyon it resides in. It does have a hydroelectric generating station.

=== Canyon Lake ===
Canyon Lake, the third lake on the Salt River, is created by the Mormon Flat Dam. The dam was completed in 1925, being the second of the dams to be completed. The dam is named for a nearby geographical feature, a flat campground where Mormon pioneers from Utah would often stop on their journey to the Phoenix area. Downstream from Apache Lake, it is considerably smaller with only 950 acres (380 ha) of surface area when full, holding 57,852 acre-feet (71,359,000 m^{3}). Like the other Salt River dams, it is equipped with hydroelectric generators.

=== Saguaro Lake ===
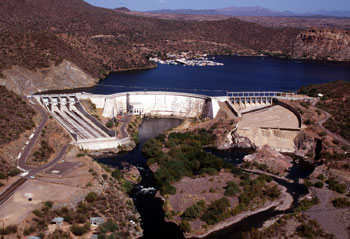
Stewart Mountain Dam and Saguaro Lake

Saguaro Lake is formed by the Stewart Mountain Dam, downstream from Canyon Lake. Completed in 1930, it was the last of the reservoirs to be built on the Salt River. It is somewhat larger than Canyon but smaller than the others, having a surface area of 1,280 acres (520 ha) when full, holding 69,765 acre-feet (86,054,000 m^{3}). The dam is equipped with hydroelectric generators.

== Verde River reservoirs and other dams ==
After completion of the four dams on the Salt River, SRP turned to the smaller Verde River for further expansion of the project. Like the reservoirs on the Salt, the Verde reservoirs are used for recreational purposes as well as water storage and flood control.

=== Bartlett Lake ===
The first of the lakes on the Verde River was created with the construction of the Bartlett Dam, finishing in 1939. At 308.5 feet (94 m) tall, the multiple-arch dam is lacking in hydroelectric generating capabilities, unlike most dams on the Salt River. Bartlett Lake, with 2,700 acres (1,100 ha) of surface area at capacity, is larger than all the Salt River reservoirs save Roosevelt. When full the lake can hold 178,186 acre-feet (219,789,000 m^{3}) of water.

=== Horseshoe Lake ===
Horseshoe Lake is formed by Horseshoe Dam and was finished in 1946, upstream from Lake Bartlett. Unlike the other dams built to this point, the construction was done by the Phelps Dodge Corporation as part of a water exchange agreement. In 1949, the city of Phoenix funded the construction of spillway gates for the dam in exchange for water rights for city users. Like Bartlett, this dam does not have hydroelectric generating capabilities. At 2,800 acres (1,100 ha) in surface area when full it is slightly larger than Bartlett but has a smaller total capacity, holding only 131,427 acre-feet (162,113,000 m^{3}) at maximum.

=== C.C. Cragin Dam and Reservoir ===
Phelps Dodge, Inc., a large mining company in Arizona, constructed the Blue Ridge Dam (now named C.C. Cragin) in 1965 to help meet its water needs. A water exchange agreement penned three years earlier promised the facilities to SRP, and in 2005 SRP took possession of the dam and water production facilities. Located on the Mogollon Rim, C.C. Cragin is not on the Salt or Verde rivers but is a part of the general watershed covered in the SRP area. The small lake has a storage capacity of only 15,000 acre-feet (19,000,000 m^{3}) of water and is used to augment the water supply for the Gila River Indian Community, northern Gila County and the town of Payson.

=== Granite Reef Dam ===
The Granite Reef Diversion Dam, constructed near the confluence of the Salt and Verde rivers, does not actually hold back a reservoir but is used to divert water from those rivers into the system of canals feeding into the Phoenix area. It was actually the first of the dams constructed, finished in 1906 to replace the Arizona Dam, which had been washed away by floods the previous year.

== Canal system ==
SRP operates canals running in a network through much of the southern half of the Phoenix metropolitan area that distributes water from the Salt River system. Major canals operated by SRP are:

- Arizona Canal, 38.62 miles (62.15 km) long
- Grand Canal, 22.43 miles (36.10 km) long
- Consolidated Canal, 18.95 miles (30.50 km) long
- Eastern Canal, 14.73 miles (23.71 km) long
- Western Canal, 13.61 miles (21.90 km) long
- South Canal, 9.91 miles (15.95 km) long
- Tempe Canal, 9.76 miles (15.71 km) long
- New Crosscut Canal, 3.4 miles (5.5 km) long

SRP also operates flood control canals throughout the Phoenix area.

== Power generation ==
Besides the power generated at several of the dams along the Salt River, SRP owns or operates, in part, several power generating stations throughout the state:

- Agua Fria Generating Station
- Coolidge Generating Station
- Coronado Generating Station
- Craig Generating Station
- Desert Basin Generating Station
- Four Corners Generating Station (owns 10%, operated by Arizona Public Service)
- Gila River Generating Station
- Hayden Generating Station
- Kyrene Generating Station
- Mesquite Generating Station
- Navajo Generating Station (owns 42.9%). Commercial generation ceased November 2019.
- Palo Verde Nuclear Generating Station (owns 20.2%, operated by Arizona Public Service)
- Santan Generating Station
- Arizona Falls

== Membership in organizations ==
=== Public Affairs Council ===
Renee Eastman, representing Salt River Project, is on the 2013-2014 Board of Directors for the Public Affairs Council (PAC).

=== National Conference of State Legislatures ===
Salt River Project is a Gold Sponsor for the National Conference of State Legislatures (NCSL).

=== Greater Phoenix Chamber of Commerce ===
Peter Hayes, an Associate General Manager at SRP, is on the board of directors of the Greater Phoenix Chamber of Commerce (GPCC).

Salt River Project has been a member of the Greater Phoenix Chamber of Commerce (GPCC) since 1940.

=== Arizona Chamber of Commerce and Industry ===
Molly Greene, is on the board of directors of the Arizona Chamber of Commerce and Industry serving as the Chair of Public Affairs Committee.

Salt River Project is an "Arizona Trustee" member of the Arizona Chamber of Commerce and Industry.

=== Greater Phoenix Urban League ===
Russell Smoldon, representing Salt River Project, is on the board of directors for the Greater Phoenix Urban League

=== Electric Power Research Institute ===
Salt River Project is a member of the Electric Power Research Institute (EPRI).

=== Large Public Power Council ===
Salt River Project is a member of the Large Public Power Council (LPPC).

=== American Public Power Association ===
Salt River Project is a member of the American Public Power Association (APPA).

=== Labor and Management Public Affairs Committee ===
Salt River Project is a member of the Labor and Management Public Affairs Committee (LAMPAC), a utility labor organization.

=== Democratic Attorneys General Association ===
Salt River Project sponsored programming on the order of $15,000 between 2006 and 2009 to the Democratic Attorneys General Association.

=== Western Governors Association ===
Salt River Project took part in several energy-related initiatives for and through the Western Governors Association (WGA).

=== Council of State Governments ===
Salt River Project is a member of the Associates program of the Council of State Governments (CSG).

=== American Legislative Exchange Council ===
Russell Smolden, representing Salt River Project, sits on the Private Enterprise Board of the American Legislative Exchange Council (ALEC).
