= List of islands of Arizona =

Islands of the state of Arizona
- Location of Arizona within the United States

Geography
- Location: Arizona
- Total islands: 34 named

Administration
- United States
- State: Arizona

The following is a list of islands of Arizona. With 113,634.57 square miles (294,312.2 km^{2}) of land, the state of Arizona is the sixth-largest in the United States. It is the third-largest state to not have an ocean coastline—after Montana and New Mexico. Despite being landlocked, Arizona does contain islands, even though the state has the third-lowest amount of water, only 363.73 square miles (942.1 km^{2}) after West Virginia and New Mexico. Arizona's 0.32% of water is the second-lowest percentage after New Mexico's 0.2% of water. The majority of Arizona's islands are in the Colorado River (mainly Lake Mead). Lake Roosevelt also contains a number of islands. The premise of country music artist George Strait's 1986 song "Ocean Front Property" revolves around the fact that Arizona is not located on an ocean.

Island	Body of water	County	Coordinates
Antelope Island	Lake Powell	Coconino	36.98333°N 111.43333°W
Beaver Island	Colorado River	Mohave	34.42167°N 114.29111°W
Beehive Island	Colorado River	Mohave	36.07222°N 114.72611°W
Bulls Head Rock	Lake Mohave	Mohave	35.20472°N 114.57278°W
Channel Island	Colorado River	Mohave	36.02833°N 114.14167°W
Decision Island	Lake Mead	Mohave	36.03944°N 114.28444°W
Deer Island	Colorado River	La Paz	34.11667°N 114.37500°W
Driftwood Island	Colorado River	Mohave	36.19278°N 114.02528°W
Haulapai Island	Colorado River	Mohave	36.03167°N 114.13583°W
Haystack Island	Lake Roosevelt	Gila	33.69639°N 111.12917°W
Heron Point	Lake Mead	Mohave	36.04750°N 114.31139°W
Hi Isle	Lake Havasu	Mohave	34.31583°N 114.14306°W
Hog Island	Bartlett Lake	Maricopa	33.84028°N 111.61694°W
Houseboat Island	Lake Mead	Mohave	36.06750°N 114.33583°W
Mohave Rock	Colorado River	Mohave	34.61278°N 114.42444°W
Napoleans Tomb	Lake Mead	Mohave	36.11917°N 114.35750°W
Panic Rock	Bartlett Lake	Maricopa	33.82472°N 111.62167°W
Pittsburg Point	Colorado River	Mohave	34.46028°N 114.36000°W
Plane Crash Island	Lake Mead	Mohave	36.05722°N 114.33250°W
Pool Islands (5 islands)	Lake Mead	Mohave	36.09833°N 114.46611°W
Punk Rock	Verde River	Yavapai	34.42583°N 111.77861°W
Rabbit Island	Lake Roosevelt	Gila	33.69694°N 111.14694°W
River Island	Colorado River	Mohave	34.65778°N 114.44944°W
Rock Island	Lake Roosevelt	Gila	33.68778°N 111.14028°W
Saddle Island	Lake Roosevelt	Gila	33.65889°N 111.07111°W
Shelter Island	Lake Roosevelt	Gila	33.66806°N 111.08000°W
Ship Rock	Saguaro Lake	Maricopa	33.56333°N 111.49639°W
Steamboat Rock	Lake Roosevelt	Gila	33.68056°N 111.08417°W
Two Rocks (2 islands)	Colorado River	Mohave	35.72500°N 114.70000°W
