= Eilean Shona =

Tidal island in Loch Moidart, Scotland

Eilean Seòna (Gaelic)

Location
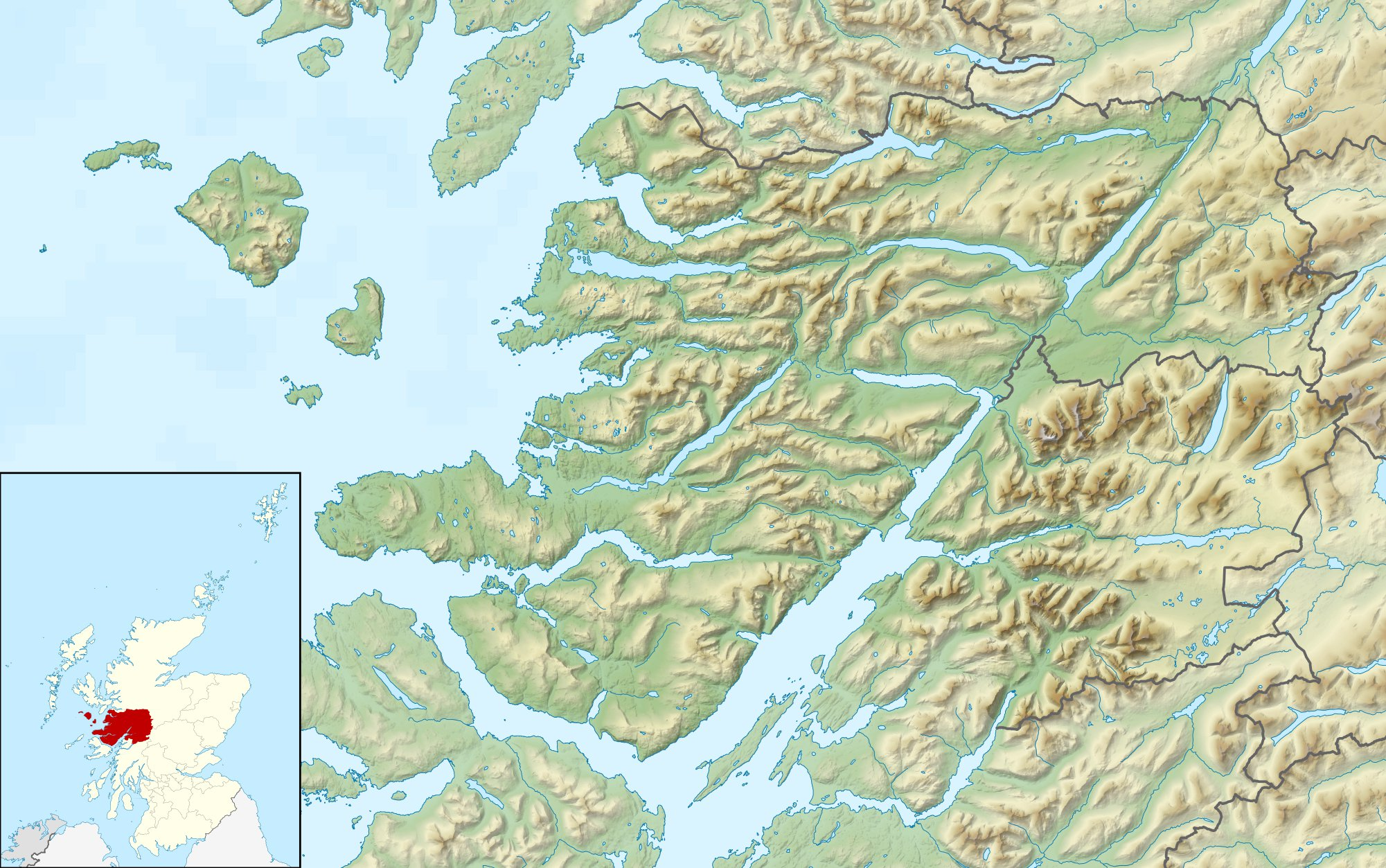
- Eilean Shona shown within Highland Scotland
- OS grid reference: NM645739
- Coordinates: 56.79859924°N 5.86086945°W

Name
- Gaelic pronunciation: [ˈelan ˈʃɔːnə]
- Name meaning: Possibly from the Norse for 'sea island'

Physical geography
- Island group: Inner Hebrides
- Area: 525 hectares (1,300 acres)
- Area rank: 72
- Highest elevation: Beinn a' Bhàillidh, 265 metres (869 ft)

Administration
- Council area: Highland
- Country: Scotland
- Sovereign state: United Kingdom

Demographics
- Population: 9
- Population rank: 68=
- Population density: 1.7 people/km^{2}
- Largest settlement: Invermoidart

Eilean Shona (Scottish Gaelic: Eilean Seòna) is a tidal island situated at the entrance of Loch Moidart, on the west coast of Scotland, just north of the Ardnamurchan Peninsula. The island is 525 hectares (1,300 acres) in area, with the highest point being Beinn a' Bhàillidh at 265 metres (869 ft). There are five other peaks of over 150 metres (490 ft) and views of the sea and off-shore islands including Rum, Eigg and Skye. It is reached by a short boat ride from the mainland (Dorlin Pier 4 km (25 miles) north of Acharacle). The modern name may be from the Old Norse for "sea island". The pre-Norse Gaelic name, as recorded by Adomnán was Airthrago or Arthràigh, meaning 'foreshore island', similar to the derivation of Erraid.

== History ==
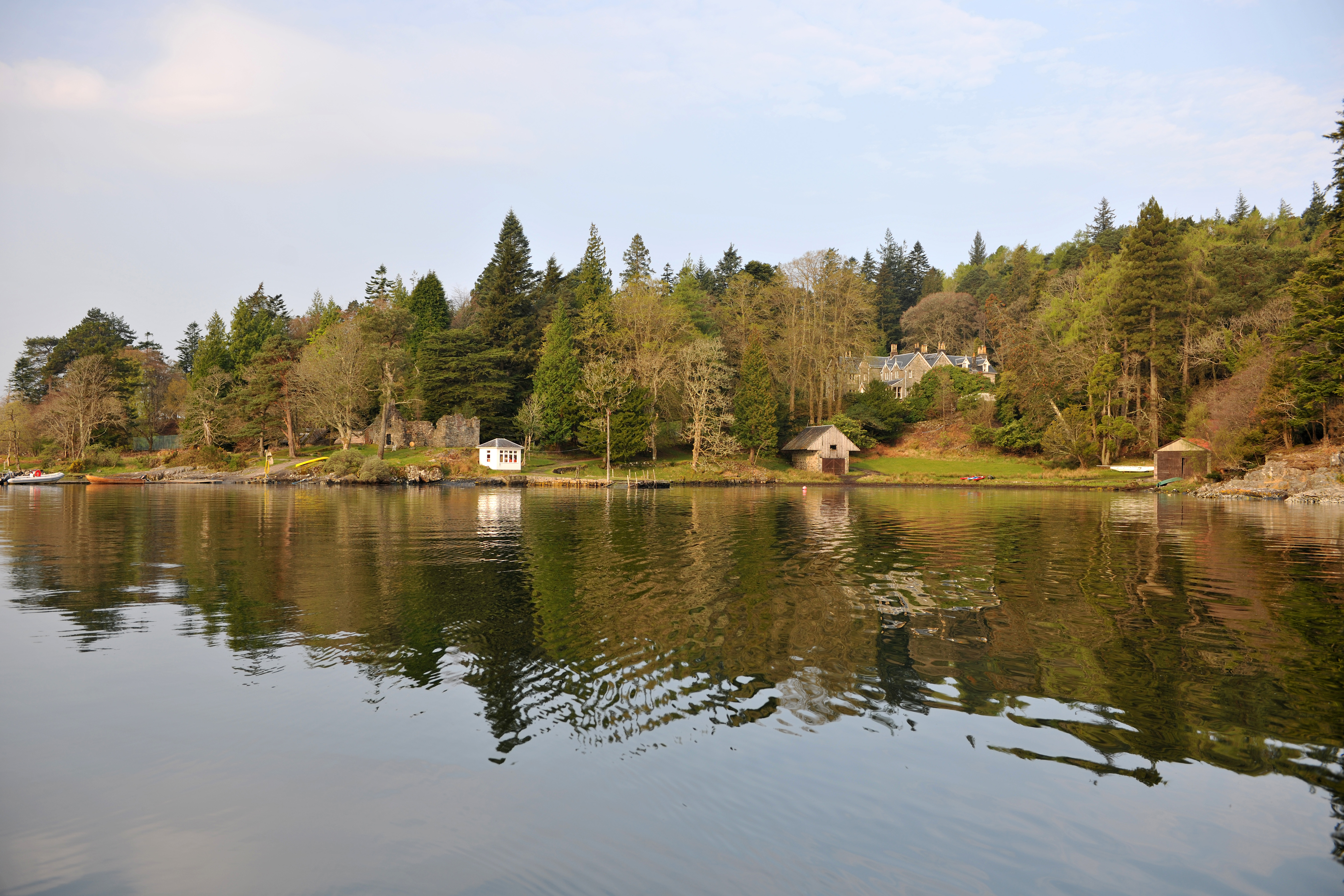
Eilean Shona House

Loch Moidart, guarded by Castle Tioram, is of historical significance in Scotland. The region was the seat of the Macdonalds of Clanranald, territory from where Charles Edward Stuart gained much of his support for the Jacobite uprising in 1745. Castle Tioram remained in Clanranalds hands until 1715 when it was set on fire and destroyed by the chieftain, Allan of Clanranald, to prevent it falling into government hands.

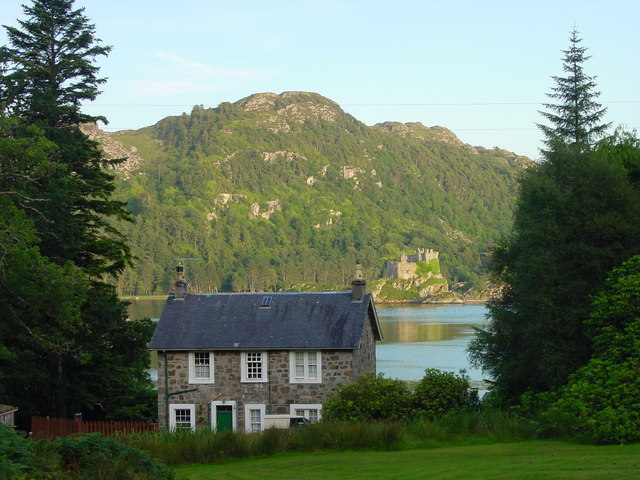
"Tioram Cottage" with Castle Tioram in background

In 1851 there were reports of evacuations and emigrations of 37 families from the island and the nearby settlement of Dorlin in the wake of potato blight. Until the middle of the 18th century, Eilean Shona was populated with a number of crofters.

In 1853 Captain Swinburne bought the main house, which was used as a small hunting lodge, for £6,500. He collected numerous types of pine on his travels and established on Eilean Shona one of the most diverse pinetums in Europe.

In 1878, Captain Swinburne sold the island to Spencer Thompson. Thompson commissioned Edinburgh architect Robert Lorimer to extend the house, doubling its size and it was completed in 1891.

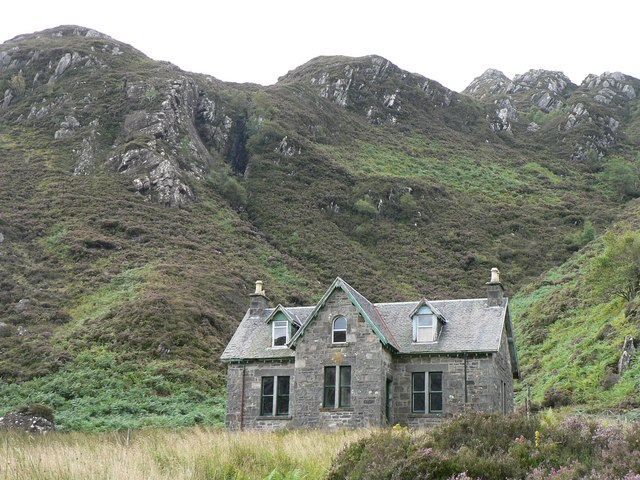
The Old Schoolhouse on Eilean Shona

Eilean Shona was leased to writer J. M. Barrie in the 1920s, who used it as a summer holiday retreat for himself, his foster sons Michael and Nicholas Llewelyn Davies, and a few of their friends. It was here that he wrote a screenplay for the 1924 film adaptation of Peter Pan and most of his play A Kiss for Cinderella. It is also alleged that Eilean Shona was the inspiration for the enchanted island location of J. M. Barrie's play, Mary Rose.

In 1934 Eilean Shona was given to Lady Howard de Walden (Irene Maria Rosario von Harrach) as a wedding present by her future husband John Scott-Ellis, 9th Baron Howard de Walden. Numerous improvements to the island, particularly to the grounds and gardens, were made at the beginning of the 20th century by the de Walden family.

Mr and Mrs Digby Vane bought the island in 1962 and sold it to the Stead family in 1982. Vanessa Branson and Robert Devereux purchased the island in 1995 for around £1.3 million. Today (2024) the island belongs to Vanessa Branson and her four children. For the last 30 years, the house and eight Hebridean croft cottages have been available for holiday lets.

During this time, Branson has restored some of the cottages and ruins on the island including the Old Schoolhouse in 2016 and the Sail Loft in 2023, using local and recycled materials. The Schoolhouse (on the North Shore track between Sawmill Cottage and Shepherd's Cottage) is in an isolated position, some two miles down a track, reputedly because when it was built in the 19th century the wife of the island's owner did not wish to be disturbed by children.

== Features ==
Pronunciation
Scots Gaelic	Pronunciation
Arthraigh	[ˈaɾhɾaj]
Beinn a' Bhàillidh	[ˈpeiɲ ə ˈvaːʎɪ]
Eilean an Fhèidh	[ˈelan ə ˈɲeː]
Eilean Seòna	[ˈelan ˈʃɔːnə]

Eilean Shona has an ongoing conservation programme to protect the pinetums and the endangered Celtic Rainforest as well as the rare fauna including red squirrels and pine martens. Eilean Shona collaborates with the British Trust for Ornithology and the Highland Raptor Study Group with a Golden Eagle Breeding Programme on the island.

The island hosts a month-long art residency in partnership with the Royal Society of Sculptors and an annual writing workshop with a fellowship offered to a young emerging writer. In 2025 this fellowship is offered in partnership with the Forward Arts Foundation.

Eilean Shona was the location for the film The Burning Baby by Paul Kindersley in 2020. The island was also the location for the film The Isle in 2018 and featured in Channel 4's Extraordinary Escapes with Sandi Toksvig in 2022.

In 2021, Eilean Shona hosted the Everland Summit on the occasion of Cop26.

The current resident population is 9, up from 2 in 2011. Guests to the island include Richard Branson, Kate Winslet, Anthony Horowitz, Jack Whitehall, Amy Liptrot and Sir Ed Davey.

Other isles in the Loch Moidart include Riska Island, Eilean an Fheidh and Eilean Tioram. Eilean Shona House overlooks Riska Island and Castle Tioram.
