= Big River, California =

- census-designated place
- Location in San Bernardino County and the state of California

- Location in the United States
- Coordinates: 34°8′2″N 114°22′11″W
- Country: United States
- State: California
- County: San Bernardino

Area
  - Total: 11.35 sq mi (29.40 km^{2})
  - Land: 10.83 sq mi (28.05 km^{2})
  - Water: 0.52 sq mi (1.34 km^{2}) 4.60%
- Elevation: 436 ft (133 m)

Population (2020)
  - Total: 1,084
  - Density: 100.1/sq mi (38.64/km^{2})
- Time zone: UTC-8 (PST)
  - Summer (DST): UTC-7 (PDT)
- ZIP code: 92242
- Area codes: 442/760
- FIPS code: 06-06635
- GNIS feature ID: 1866999

Big River is a census-designated place (CDP) in San Bernardino County, California, United States. The population was 1,084 at the 2020 census, down from 1,327 at the 2010 census.

== Geography ==
Big River is located on the west bank of the Colorado River at 34°8′2″N 114°22′11″W (34.134021, -114.369782). Since the river is mostly flowing west at this point, Big River is mostly north of the Arizona side. Immediately across the current flow of the river is Deer Island, shared between California and Arizona based on a previous course of the river as is much of the California/Arizona border.

According to the United States Census Bureau, the CDP has a total area of 11.4 square miles (30 km^{2}). 10.8 square miles (28 km^{2}) of it is land and 0.5 square miles (1.3 km^{2}) of it (4.60%) is water.

== Parks and Recreation ==
Parks in Big River are administered by the Big River Community Service District

== Demographics ==
Historical population
Census	Pop.	Note	%±
1990	705		—
2000	1,266		79.6%
2010	1,327		4.8%
2020	1,084		−18.3%
U.S. Decennial Census; 1850–1870 1880-1890; 1900 1910 1920; 1930 1940 1950; 1960 1970 1980; 1990 2000 2010

Big River was first listed as a census designated place in the 1980 U.S. census.

=== Racial and ethnic composition ===
Big River CDP, California – Racial and ethnic composition Note: the US Census treats Hispanic/Latino as an ethnic category. This table excludes Latinos from the racial categories and assigns them to a separate category. Hispanics/Latinos may be of any race.
Race / Ethnicity (NH = Non-Hispanic)	Pop 2000	Pop 2010	Pop 2020	% 2000	% 2010	% 2020
White alone (NH)	1,036	1,055	793	81.83%	79.50%	73.15%
Black or African American alone (NH)	31	13	9	2.45%	0.98%	0.83%
Native American or Alaska Native alone (NH)	29	45	61	2.29%	3.39%	5.63%
Asian alone (NH)	12	2	10	0.95%	0.15%	0.92%
Native Hawaiian or Pacific Islander alone (NH)	0	0	1	0.00%	0.00%	0.09%
Other race alone (NH)	4	0	1	0.32%	0.00%	0.09%
Mixed race or Multiracial (NH)	32	52	42	2.53%	3.92%	3.87%
Hispanic or Latino (any race)	122	160	167	9.64%	12.06%	15.41%
Total	1,266	1,327	1,084	100.00%	100.00%	100.00%

=== 2020 census ===
As of the 2020 census, Big River had a population of 1,084 and a population density of 100.1 inhabitants per square mile (38.6/km^{2}).

The median age was 59.8 years. The age distribution was 11.5% under the age of 18, 4.4% aged 18 to 24, 14.5% aged 25 to 44, 31.1% aged 45 to 64, and 38.5% who were 65 years of age or older. For every 100 females, there were 101.5 males, and for every 100 females age 18 and over, there were 102.7 males age 18 and over. 65.4% of residents lived in urban areas, while 34.6% lived in rural areas.

The whole population lived in households. There were 550 households, out of which 14.4% included children under the age of 18. Of all households, 34.7% were married-couple households, 8.7% were cohabiting couple households, 25.6% had a male householder with no spouse or partner present, and 30.9% had a female householder with no spouse or partner present. 40.4% of households were one person, and 23.6% were one person aged 65 or older. The average household size was 1.97. There were 272 families (49.5% of all households).

There were 1,014 housing units at an average density of 93.6 units per square mile (36.1 units/km^{2}), of which 550 (54.2%) were occupied. Of occupied units, 80.0% were owner-occupied and 20.0% were occupied by renters. Of all housing units, 45.8% were vacant. The homeowner vacancy rate was 2.6% and the rental vacancy rate was 11.9%.

Racial composition as of the 2020 census
Race	Number	Percent
White	830	76.6%
Black or African American	10	0.9%
American Indian and Alaska Native	77	7.1%
Asian	10	0.9%
Native Hawaiian and Other Pacific Islander	1	0.1%
Some other race	39	3.6%
Two or more races	117	10.8%

== Government ==
In the California State Legislature, Big River is in the 18th senatorial district, represented by Democrat Steve Padilla, and in the 36th Assembly district, represented by Republican Jeff Gonzalez.

In the United States House of Representatives, Big River is in California's 25th congressional district, represented by Democrat Raul Ruiz.
