= Deer Pond =

Deer Pond may refer to:

- Deer Pond (Plymouth, Massachusetts)
- Deer Pond (Stillwater, New York)
- Deer Pond (Wolf Mountain, New York)
