= Deer Mountain =

Deer Mountain is the name of several landforms in the United States:

- Deer Mountain (Alaska) in Ketchikan Gateway Borough, Alaska
- Deer Mountain (Nevada)
- Deer Mountain (New York)
- Deer Mountain (South Dakota)
