= Deer Lake =

There are several places named Deer Lake in Canada and the United States:

== Canada ==
By province

- Deer Lake (British Columbia)
- Deer Lake (Newfoundland and Labrador), a large lake in western Newfoundland
  - Deer Lake, Newfoundland and Labrador, a town located on Deer Lake
  - Deer Lake Regional Airport, an airport located in the town of Deer Lake
- Deer Lake First Nation, Northern Ontario
  - Deer Lake Airport (Ontario), north of Deer Lake, Ontario
  - Deer Lake/Keyamawun Water Aerodrome, located on Deer Lake, Ontario
  - Deer Lake Water Aerodrome, airport located on Deer Lake, Ontario

== United States ==
By state

- Deer Lake (Connecticut), a lake in Killingworth
- Deer Lake (Florida), a lake in Highlands County
- Deer Lake State Park, Walton County, Florida
- Deer Lake (Lake County, Illinois), near Antioch, Illinois
- Deer Lake (Michigan), a lake in Marquette County
- Deer Lake (Independence Township, Michigan), a lake in Oakland County
- Deer Lake, Minnesota, an unorganized territory in Itasca County
- Deer Lake (Itasca County, Minnesota), a lake located in Itasca County
- Deer Lake (New York), a lake located in Delaware County
- Deer Lake, Pennsylvania, a borough in Schuylkill County
- Deer Lake (Taylor River), a lake in King County, Washington
- Deer Lake (Washington), a lake in Stevens County
