= Horseshoe Lake (Arizona) =

Lake formed by Horseshoe Dam

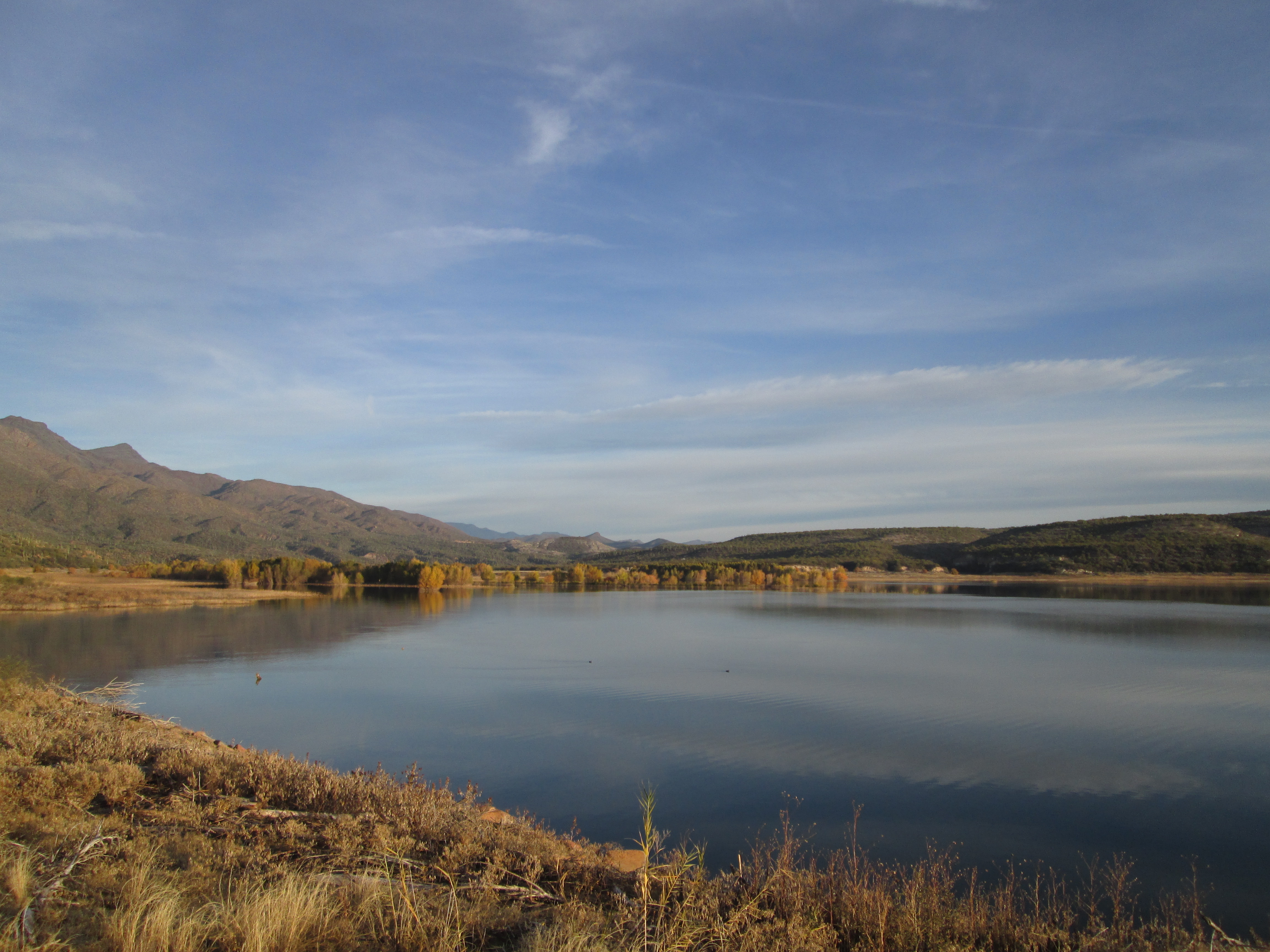
- The top of Horseshoe Reservoir looking north in December 2015

- Location within Arizona
- Location: Maricopa / Yavapai counties, Arizona, United States
- Coordinates: 33°59′8.83″N 111°43′16.21″W
- Type: Reservoir
- Primary inflows: Verde River
- Primary outflows: Verde River
- Basin countries: United States
- Max. length: 5 miles (8.0 km)
- Surface area: 790 acres (320 ha)
- Average depth: 30 ft (9.1 m)
- Max. depth: 77 ft (23 m)
- Water volume: 109,217 acre⋅ft (134,717,000 m^{3})
- Shore length^{1}: 27 miles (43 km)
- Surface elevation: 2,200 ft (670 m)
- ^{1} Shore length is not a well-defined measure.

Horseshoe Lake is a reservoir that was formed by the Horseshoe Dam on the Verde River in the U.S. state of Arizona. The lake and dam are located inside the Tonto National Forest is located upstream and north of Bartlett Lake. The dam is managed by the Salt River Project.
