= List of shipwrecks in May 1832 =

The list of shipwrecks in May 1832 includes ships sunk, foundered, grounded, or otherwise lost during May 1832.

== 1 May ==
List of shipwrecks: 1 May 1832
Ship	State	Description
Sugnal	United Kingdom	The ship was wrecked at Eastport, Maine. Her crew were rescued.

== 2 May ==
List of shipwrecks: 2 May 1832
Ship	State	Description
Rose	United Kingdom	The ship was lost off Tory Island, County Donegal. She was on a voyage from Limerick to Liverpool, Lancashire.

== 4 May ==
List of shipwrecks: 4 May 1832
Ship	State	Description
Carolus Magnus	Stettin	The ship was wrecked on "Lodersand". She was on a voyage from Málaga, Spain to Stettin.

== 5 May ==
List of shipwrecks: 5 May 1832
Ship	State	Description
George	United Kingdom	The ship was wrecked near Domesnes, Russia. Her crew were rescued.
Opsray	Denmark	The brig was wrecked on Asparagus Island, off The Lizard, Cornwall, United Kingdom with the loss of a crew member. She was on a voyage from Havana, Cuba to Hamburg.

== 6 May ==
List of shipwrecks: 6 May 1832
Ship	State	Description
Mary	United Kingdom	The sloop was driven ashore and wrecked near "Portraeth", Caernarfonshire. Her crew were rescued.
Thomas Baker	United Kingdom	The ship was wrecked on the south coast of Götaland, Sweden. She was on a voyage from Sunderland, County Durham to Saint Petersburg, Russia.

== 7 May ==
List of shipwrecks: 7 May 1832
Ship	State	Description
Harmony	United Kingdom	The ship was wrecked on the south coast of Götaland, Sweden. She was on a voyage from Leith, Lothian to Saint Petersburg, Russia.

== 8 May ==
List of shipwrecks: 8 May 1832
Ship	State	Description
Jonge Heere	Bremen	The ship was driven ashore on Vlieland, Friesland, Netherlands. She was on a voyage from Hull, Yorkshire to Bremen. Jong Heere was refloated on 10 August and taken to Eierland, North Holland, Netherlands.

== 9 May ==
List of shipwrecks: 9 May 1832
Ship	State	Description
Alert	United Kingdom	The ship was driven ashore and wrecked on Skagen, Denmark with the loss of all hands. She was on a voyage from Liverpool, Lancashire to Saint Petersburg, Russia.
Erbgrossherzog	Rostock	The ship was driven ashore and wrecked at Warnemünde. She was on a voyage from London, United Kingdom to Rostock.
Douglas	France	The ship was driven ashore near Thisted, Denmark. Her crew were rescued. She was on a voyage from Havre de Grâce, Seine-Inférieure to a Baltic port.
Woodhall	United Kingdom	The brig foundered off Skagen, Denmark with the loss of all but two of her crew. She was on a voyage from South Shields, County Durham to Saint Petersburg.

== 10 May ==
List of shipwrecks: 10 May 1832
Ship	State	Description
Asia	United Kingdom	The ship was driven ashore 9 nautical miles (17 km) east of Warnemünde, Rostock. She was on a voyage from Newcastle upon Tyne, Northumberland to Lübeck.
Cholmondley	United Kingdom	The ship sprang a leak and was beached at Sewerby, Yorkshire. She was on a voyage from South Shields, County Durham to Saint Petersburg, Russia.
Johanna	United Kingdom	The ship was wrecked near Randers, Denmark. She was on a voyage from Newcastle upon Tyne, Northumberland to Randers.

== 12 May ==
List of shipwrecks: 12 May 1832
Ship	State	Description
Charlotta	(United Kingdom of Great Britain and Ireland) Jamaica	The cutter was wrecked on the Ship Rock.
Ingersburg Elizabeth	Russia	The ship was wrecked in the Vlie. Her crew were rescued. She was on a voyage from Liepāja to Amsterdam, North Holland, Netherlands.
Po	United Kingdom	The ship was wrecked near Ramsgate, Kent. Her crew were rescued. She was on a voyage from London to Bristol, Gloucestershire.
Sarah	United Kingdom	The ship was abandoned in the Atlantic Ocean. She was on a voyage from Bordeaux, Gironde, France to Quebec City, Lower Canada, British North America.

== 15 May ==
List of shipwrecks: 15 May 1832
Ship	State	Description
Wellington	United Kingdom	The ship was wrecked at Cape Rozier, British North America. She was on a voyage from Leith, Lothian to Quebec City, Lower Canada, British North America.

== 16 May ==
List of shipwrecks: 16 May 1832
Ship	State	Description
Conveyance	United Kingdom	The ship was wrecked at Brora, Sutherland. Her crew were rescued
Fingal	United Kingdom	The ship was driven ashore and wrecked at Eastport, Maine, United States.

== 20 May ==
List of shipwrecks: 20 May 1832
Ship	State	Description
Only Son	(United Kingdom of Great Britain and Ireland) British North America	The ship was wrecked on Deer Island, Newfoundland. She was on a voyage from Saint John, New Brunswick to Halifax, Nova Scotia.
Traveller	United Kingdom	The sloop was wrecked 4 nautical miles (7.4 km) north of Whitby, Yorkshire. Her crew were rescued.

=== 21 May ===
List of shipwrecks: 21 May 1832
Ship	State	Description
Indian Chief	United States	The ship was driven ashore at Eastport, Maine. She was refloated but was declared a total loss.
Susan	United Kingdom	The brig was wrecked at Eastport.

== 27 May ==
List of shipwrecks: 27 May 1832
Ship	State	Description
Claremont	United Kingdom	The ship was lost in ice off Cape St. Francis, Newfoundland, British North America. Her crew survived.
Cousins	United Kingdom	The ship was lost in ice of Cape St. Francis. Her crew survived. She was on a voyage from Bristol, Gloucestershire to Saint John, New Brunswick, British North America.
Recruit	United Kingdom	The ship departed from Halifax, Nova Scotia, British North America for Jamaica. No further trace, presumed foundered with the loss of all hands.
Sir J. Kemp	United Kingdom	The ship was lost in ice off Cape St. Francis. Her crew were rescued by the brig Jantha (United Kingdom).

== Unknown date ==
List of shipwrecks: Unknown date 1832
Ship	State	Description
Emanuel	Norway	The ship sprang a leak and was beached at Harwich, Essex, United Kingdom. She was on a voyage from London, United Kingdom to a Norwegian port.
Jonge Eere	Bremen	The ship was wrecked on Vlieland, Friesland, Netherlands in early May. She was on a voyage from Hull, Yorkshire, United Kingdom to Bremen.
Louise	Belgium	The ship foundered between Ameland and Schiermonnikoog, Friesland.
Tiber	United Kingdom	The ship was destroyed by fire at Point Arena, Alta California in late May with the loss of all but three of her crew.
