= Bartlett Dam =

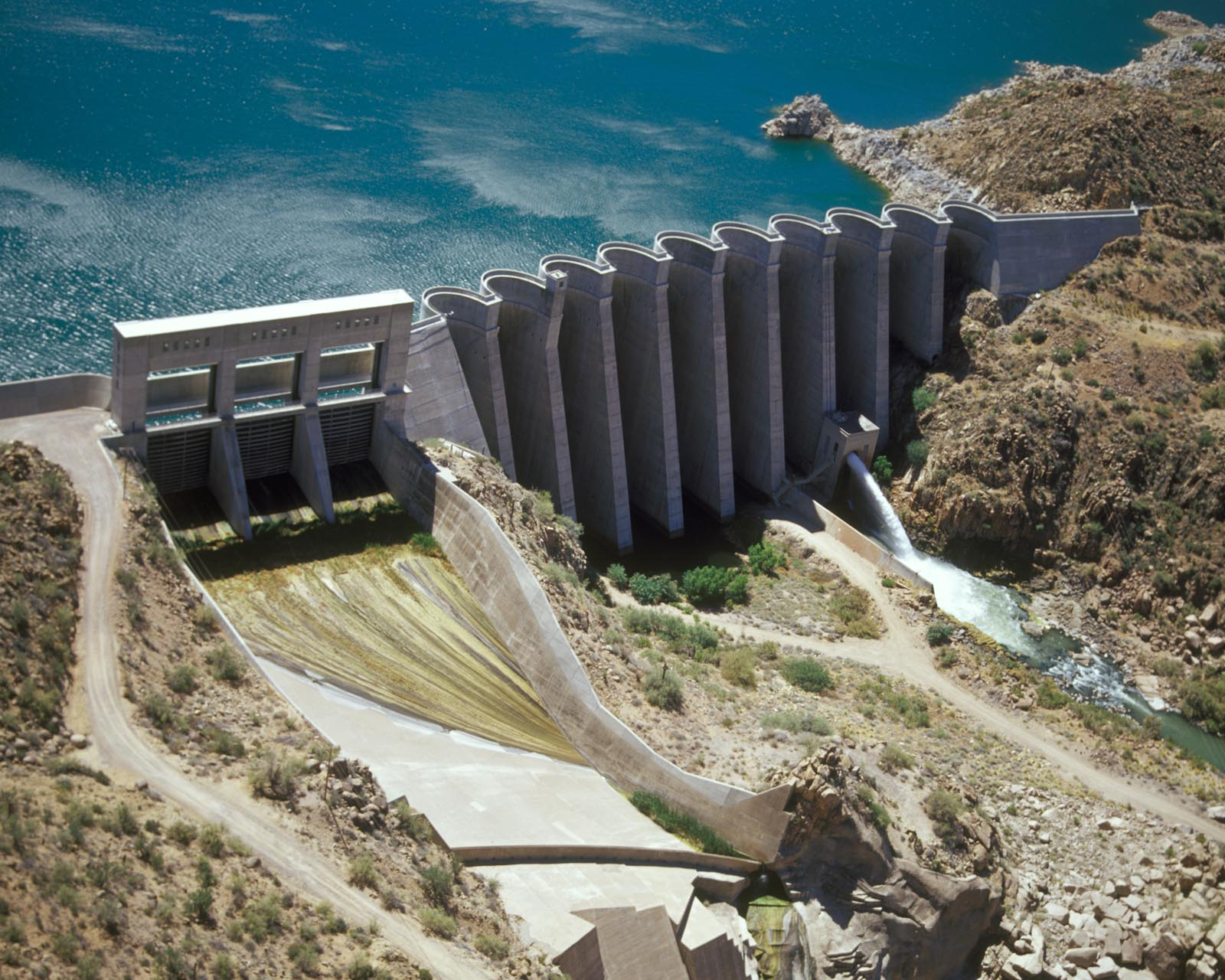
- Bartlett Dam

- Location within Arizona
- Location: Tonto National Forest, Maricopa County, near Phoenix, Arizona
- Coordinates: 33°49′5″N 111°37′54″W
- Status: In use
- Construction began: 1936
- Opening date: 1939
- Owner: U.S. Bureau of Reclamation
- Operator: Salt River Project

Dam and spillways
- Type of dam: Concrete, multiple-arch buttress
- Impounds: Verde River
- Height: 308.5 ft (94.0 m)
- Length: 823 ft (251 m)
- Width (crest): 4.5 ft (1.4 m)
- Width (base): 7.5 ft (2.3 m)
- Dam volume: 223,773 cu yd (171,087 m^{3})
- Spillway type: Service, gate-controlled
- Spillway capacity: 287,500 cu ft/s (8,140 m^{3}/s)

Reservoir
- Creates: Bartlett Lake
- Total capacity: 178,186 acre-feet (219,789,000 m^{3})
- Catchment area: 6,160 sq mi (16,000 km^{2})
- Surface area: 2,700 acres (11 km^{2})

The Bartlett Dam is a concrete multiple-arch buttress dam on the Verde River, located 50 km northeast of Phoenix, Arizona. The dam creates Bartlett Lake and its primary purpose is irrigation water supply. It was the first dam constructed on the Verde River and the first of its type constructed by the U.S. Bureau of Reclamation. It was built between 1936 and 1939. It was named after Bill Bartlett, a government surveyor. It was listed on the National Register of Historic Places in 2017.

== History ==
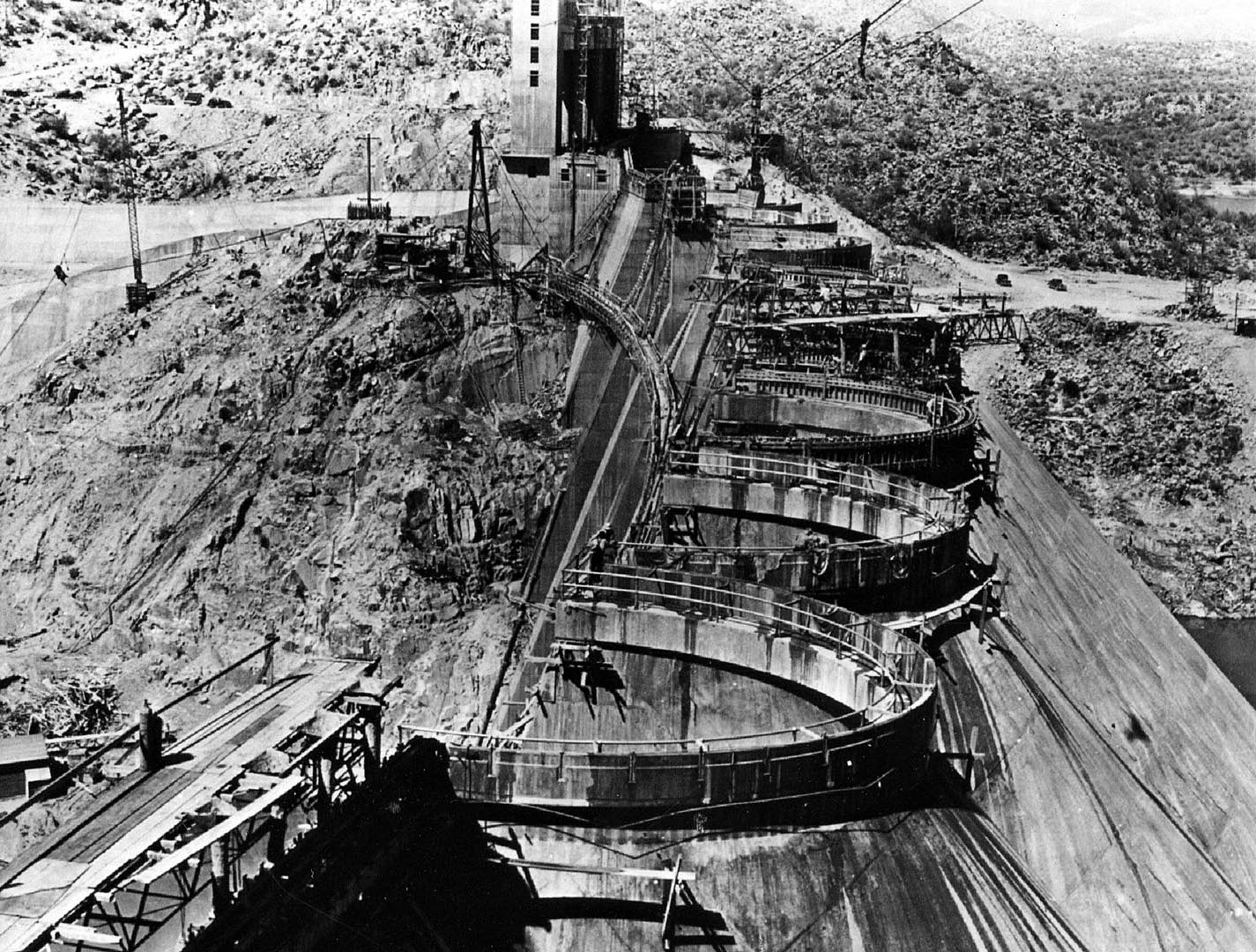
The dam under construction in 1939.

In response to the Great Depression and subsequent drops in crop prices, farmers struggled harder to have a dam constructed on the Verde River. Finally, in 1935, the Salt River Project received approval to build the Bartlett Dam. The U.S. Bureau of Reclamation constructed the dam between 1936 and 1939, in a total of 1,000 days. Upon completion, the dam was the tallest multiple arch buttress type in the world at the time. 80% of the funding for the dam was provided by the Salt River Project (SRP) and 20% by the Bureau of Indian Affairs. Construction on the dam provided needed jobs and flood control on the river. Although flood waters temporarily halted construction in February 1937, flooding was finally minimized with the construction of the dam. The next large flood in the area would not come until the winter of 1965–66.

Because of safety concerns, the dam was later modified during the mid-1990s by the Bureau of Reclamation. Beginning in March 1994, the dam was raised 21.5 feet (6.6 m) and subsequently, its service spillway was modified as well to accompany the new height. An unlined auxiliary spillway was also constructed about 1,500 feet (460 m) south of the dam's left abutment. The new spillway consists of a concrete control structure and a three-segment fuse plug which is designed to erode in specific stages during flooding. The modifications to the dam were complete in December 1996.

== Design, dimensions, and impoundment ==
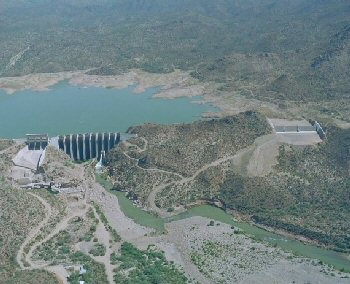
A view of the dam and both spillways

The Bartlett dam consists of 10 arches, 9 buttresses, and is flanked by 2 gravity wing dams. Before being modified, the Bartlett Dam was 287 ft (87 m) tall and contained 182,000 cu yd (139,000 m^{3}) of concrete. After the mid-1990s modification, the dam is 308.5 ft (94.0 m) tall, made of 223,773 cu yd (171,087 m^{3}) of concrete, and has a length of 823 ft (251 m). The width of the dam arch's ranges from 7.5 ft (2.3 m) at its base and 4.5 ft (1.4 m) at its crest.

The reservoir created by the dam, Bartlett Lake, has a 178,186 acre-feet (219,789,000 m^{3}) capacity at the normal surface water elevation of 1,798 ft (548 m). It drains an area of 6,160 sq mi (16,000 km^{2}) and has a surface area of 2,700 acres (11 km^{2}). The dam's outlet works have a discharge capacity of 2,400 cu ft/s (68 m^{3}/s). When the reservoir is at the maximum water elevation of 1,821 ft (555 m), the service spillway has a 287,500 cu ft/s (8,140 m^{3}/s) capacity while the auxiliary spillway can discharge up to 261,700 cu ft/s (7,410 m^{3}/s).
