= Deers =

Deers may refer to:

- Deers, Illinois, U.S., an unincorporated community
- Deer, improperly pluralized as "deers", ruminant mammals
- Defense Enrollment Eligibility Reporting System, a U.S. Department of Defense program

== See also ==
- Deers Den, an archaeological site at Kintore, Aberdeenshire, Scotland
- The Deer's Bell, a Chinese animated film produced by Shanghai Animation Film Studio
- Deer's Mill, Indiana, an unincorporated town in Ripley Township, Montgomery County
- Deer (disambiguation)
