= Deer (given name) =

Deer is a Native American given name. Notable people with the name include:

- Deer Scout (fl. early 21st century), professional name of Dena Miller, American indie folk musician
- Dick Deer Slayer (fl. 1920s), Native American NFL player
- Susan Deer Cloud (born 1950), Native American writer
