= Arizona Capitol Times =

Newspaper in Phoenix, Arizona

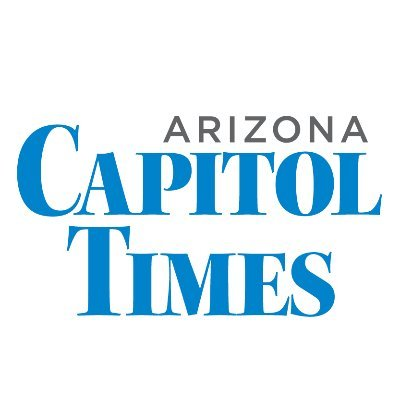
- Type: Weekly newspaper
- Format: Tabloid
- Owner(s): State Affairs, Inc.
- Publisher: State Affairs, Inc.
- Editor-in-chief: Alison Bethel
- Editor: Gary Grado, Yellow Sheet editor
- Managing editor: Teri Hayt
- Founded: 1906
- Headquarters: 1835 W. Adams Street, Phoenix, AZ
- Circulation: 1,159 Print; 284 E-Subscription (as of 2022)
- Website: azcapitoltimes.com

The Arizona Capitol Times is a non-partisan, weekly newspaper covering state politics and government published every Friday in Phoenix, Arizona. The paper focuses on the Arizona Legislature, the state's politicians, government agencies and elected leadership.

== History ==
Arizona News Service, which publishes the Arizona Capitol Times, was founded by Ned Creighton in 1906 before Arizona became a state. The operation was run and expanded by his son Robert until 1970, when Robert's son, also Ned, assumed control of the business.

During the first four decades, the elder Ned Creighton ran Arizona News Service out of various buildings in downtown Phoenix, Ariz. In 1946, Robert Creighton convinced his father, who he had worked with during World War II, to jointly purchase a newspaper then called The Messenger, which was founded in 1900. They each chipped in $750 so they could buy the paper for $1,500.

In 1959, the name of the paper was changed from The Messenger to The Arizona Legislative Review to better reflect its content. During that time, the newspaper was largely a recital of bills in the Arizona Legislature and occasional news stories about Arizona politics. With the hiring of a reporter, the publication began to evolve in the late 1950s and 1960s. It started including more news stories and going beyond just functioning as a paper of record.

In 1982, The Arizona Legislative Review was renamed Arizona Capitol Times. During the early 1980s, Creighton's wife Diana joined the newspaper. She read and rewrote short versions of Arizona Attorney General opinions and developed an old-photograph feature - Times Past - that continues today. It is one of the paper's most popular features.

In 2005, Arizona News Service, which includes the Arizona Capitol Times, was purchased by Minneapolis-based Dolan Media Company, Inc. (Now known as The Dolan Company) (NYSE:DM).

Dolan Media went public in 2008 and in 2014 filed a prepackaged bankruptcy plan that it exited in June of the same year. Bayside Capital took over ownership in June 2014 until January 2016 when Arizona News Service and its sister publications across the country that include niche print, digital publications and events were purchased by New Media Investment Group, owners of GateHouse Media and Propel Marketing. Today they are owned by BridgeTower Media, the B2B media division of GateHouse Media.

The Arizona Capitol Times was acquired by State Affairs, Inc. in 2024.

== Daily content ==
The Arizona Capitol Times covers state politics, government and business with a focus on the daily activities of the Arizona Senate, Arizona House of Representatives and the state's top elected officials, including the Governor's Office. The paper also publishes stories on elections, court rulings and the actions of local governments. The paper regularly features commentaries, letters to the editor, an event calendar, a people in the news page, a listing of state contracts, an Arizona news roundup page and political news from other states.

== Weekly features ==
- Cap Times Q&A A question and answer interview with a political or business figure who has recently made the news.
- Times Past: Stories from the state's - and sometimes the territory's - past. Entries typically include an old photograph of the subject and are written by state historians and other freelance writers.
- Focus: A section piece typically eight to 16 pages dedicated to a specific subject such as economic development, environment, healthcare, transportation, energy and much more. Stories are written in "enterprise" style - including in-depth analyses and an array of photos.
- Supplements: A stand-alone section piece typically eight to 24 pages dedicated to a specific subject such as education, community giving & volunteers, Going Green and much more. Stories are written in "enterprise" style - including in-depth analyses and an array of photos.

== Public notices ==
The Arizona Capitol Times Public Notices section contains notices that are required by law to be published in a newspaper of general circulation that is adjudicated. Public notices describe activity of public interest and concern and report activity or planned activity by government, including the courts. There are three general types of public notices as classified by the Public Notice Resource Center in Washington, D.C.: citizen participation notices, business and commerce notices and court notice. Public notices that are published in the Arizona Capitol Times include: property sales and auctions, corporations and partnerships, civil cases, conservators and adoptions, and wills. In addition to publishing public notices, the Arizona Capitol Times also offers affidavit filing services, statewide publication services and full-service corporate filing with the Corporation Commission or Secretary of State's Office.

== Legislation On Line Arizona (LOLA) ==
LOLA is a subscription-based, Internet legislative information service used by lobbyists and government affairs professionals to search for, track and report on Arizona legislation. The service began in 1986 as one of the country's first on-line legislative bill tracking systems. It also is a founding member of (NOLA) – a national association of legislative information sources.

LOLA offers a comprehensive bill tracking system that allows its clients to comment on bills, create reports and receive e-mail notifications of bill activity. In addition, the system provides summaries of every bill filed during a legislative session, along with complete floor action, votes, amendments and versions of all bills. It also offers committee hearing agendas; debate, voting and caucus calendars; legislators' biographies and contact information; and news notes on daily legislative happenings. This information is updated continuously during legislative sessions and has been archived on-line since 1999.

Other LOLA features include Friends & Foes – a vote analysis tool that compares clients' positions on bills to legislators' voting records; WebReports – a Web-based, dynamic report of tracked bills clients can access from a custom-generated URL; and Enterprise Forums – a premium account that consists of a message board for multiple clients to discuss legislation.

== Yellow Sheet Report ==
The Yellow Sheet Report is a subscription-based, on-line newsletter for Arizona political gossip and news. It originated in 1906 as part of the Arizona News Service and provided clients with political and governmental news when the legislature was not in session. The newsletter got its name from the onionskin paper on which it originally was printed. In recent years, the Yellow Sheet Report was published and mailed three times a week. In 2007, it moved to the World Wide Web and is now available year-round.

The Yellow Sheet Report is the "News Notes & Gossip" section – a compilation of short news pieces that cover the gamut of Arizona politics, including news about the legislature, state agencies, the executive offices, the state's congressional delegation and elections. Much of the news centers on commentary and gossip from political consultants, lobbyists and other political insiders, often known in Arizona's political community as "railbirds".

In addition, the Yellow Sheet Report provides clips from and links to local and national newspapers, postings from political blogs, news releases, documents, charts, photos and agendas for legislative interim meetings. And, every Friday a special report is published of statewide and regulatory meetings and summaries of any current attorney general opinions.

== Arizona Legislative Report ==
The Arizona Legislative Report is a subscription-based, hard-copy news service providing legislative documents, indexes and news to lobbyists, lawyers and government affairs professionals in Arizona. It is hand-delivered or mailed to clients every weekday by 5 p.m. during Arizona's annual legislative session (approximately January through May). The Legislative Report, along with the Yellow Sheet Report, originated in 1906 as part of the Arizona News Service. It was the main source of legislative news and records for miners, ranchers and businessmen needing to know what was happening at the Capitol.

The Legislative Report contains copies and summaries of all bills filed during the legislative session, all adopted amendments compiled into a continuous daily amendment record, a daily record of bill activity from committees and the House and Senate floors, weekly bill status indexes, upcoming committee hearing agendas, and a post-session report of enactments.

The Legislative Report also includes a section called “News Notes” – a compilation of political news briefs, summaries of House and Senate floor debates, political research and analysis, and newsclips from local and national newspapers. In addition, the service supplies copies of important documents and reports on the state budget, state agency presentations and speeches from elected officials, legislators and political figures.

== Additional publications ==
Arizona News Service produces a number of targeted publications focused on particular aspects of Arizona politics, including:

=== Government Resource Directory ===
A magazine-style guide published annually in December. It includes comprehensive contact information for all of the state's elected and appointed officials, state agencies, the state's courts, many state lobbyists and licensing and certification boards. The publication also includes a complete list of state legislators and Arizona's congressional delegation.

=== Book of Lobbyists ===
A magazine-style publication typically produced in February. It features articles about the profession and lists the vast majority of the state's lobbyists and their contact information. Some entries include client listing and specialties. This publication is linked to a free Web site, Arizona Lobbyists, where lobbyists can enter their information themselves and become part of a future edition.

=== Arizona Political Almanac ===
First published in 2008, the Political Almanac features charts and graphs covering Arizona elections, the legislature, elected officials, state finances and money, U.S. Congress and courts. The publication represents years of work done by Arizona Capitol Times reporters and staff.

=== Citizen Government ===
Published annually in July, the guide features short descriptions and members of Arizona's governor-appointed boards and commissions. It takes its name from the fact that the boards and commissions are filled mostly by average citizens with particular knowledge and expertise in particular areas of government.

=== Guide to the Legislature (The Green Book) ===
Published annually to coincide with the beginning of the legislative session, Arizona Capitol Report's Guide to the Legislature features the name, district, office location, assistant's name, contact information, committees, interests, political experience and personal information of each of the state's 90 lawmakers. It is referred to as "The Green Book" because the pocket-sized publication's cover is always green.

=== Trade & Professional Associations Directory ===
First published in April 2008, the magazine-style publication features contact and leadership information for many of the state's trade and professional associations, such as chambers of commerce.

== Events ==
The Arizona Capitol Times hosts a number of annual events honoring members of the state's Capitol community. These include Leaders of the Year in Public Policy, Best of the Capitol, Meet the Candidates, Rock the Capitol: Meet the Freshmen, Women in Public Policy, The Influentials, Morning Scoop breakfast discussions on water, education, healthcare, transportation and issues affecting the Capitol community.
