= Arizona Chamber of Commerce and Industry =

Business advocacy group

- Motto: Uniting Business. Advancing Arizona.
- Established: 1974
- Key people: Danny Seiden (President & CEO Summer 2021); Molly Greene (Chairman of the Board); Mark Gaspers (Chairman-Elect); Nick Goodman (Immediate Past Chair)
- Address: 3200 North Central Avenue; Phoenix, Arizona 85012
- Location: Phoenix, Arizona
- Website: www.azchamber.com

The Arizona Chamber of Commerce and Industry is an Arizona based chamber of commerce. Since 1974, the Arizona Chamber of Commerce and Industry has been promoting statewide business advocacy at the Arizona Capitol and with the Arizona congressional delegation. Its membership employs 250,000 Arizonans from all sectors of the Arizona economy. The Board of Directors of the Arizona Chamber of Commerce and Industry is composed of more than 120 business executives, representing industries across Arizona. The Arizona Chamber is governed by 9 board member directors and 32 Executive Committee members. Following the departure of President & CEO Glenn Hammer, Garrick Taylor served as the Interim President & CEO until Danny Seiden began his tenure in early Summer of 2021.

Past Chairmen
- Chair: Molly Greene (July 2022-Current); Nick Goodman (July 2021-June 2022); Dawn Grove (July 2020-June 2021); Susan Anable (July 2018-June 2020); Steve Macias (July 2017-June 2018); Dennis Dahlen (July 2016-June 2017); Jason Bagley (July 2015-June 2016); Alan Heywood (July 2014-June 2015); Pat Barnes (July 2013-June 2014); Doug Yonko (July 2012-June 2013); Mark Dobbins (July 2011-June 2012); Reg Ballantyne (July 2010-June 2011); Don Robinson (July 2009-June 2010); Dick Hannon (July 2008-June 2009); Ivan Johnson (July 2007-June 2008); Steve Twist (July 2006-June 2007); Jim Lowman (July 2005-June 2006); CA Howlett (July 2004-June 2005); Joseph Coyle (July 2003-June 2004); Jack Davis (July 2002-June 2003); Steve Roman (July 2001-June 2002); Greg Denk (July 2000-June 2001); Jack Henry (July 1999-June 2000); Dean Borgman (July 1998-June 1999)

== Arizona Manufacturers Council ==
In 2007, the Arizona Chamber of Commerce and Industry merged with the Arizona Association of Industries to create a new entity called the Arizona Manufacturers Council (AMC). The AMC deals with policy issues that impact manufacturers of all sizes statewide, including the environment, energy, education/workforce development, human resources, and intellectual property. The AMC also hosts events of special interest to the manufacturing industry. The Arizona Manufacturers Council is the official state affiliate of the National Association of Manufacturers.

The Arizona Manufacturers Council Chair serves as an Officer and as part of the executive committee for the Chamber. The 2021 Chair of the Arizona Manufacturers Council is Mark Gaspers from The Boeing Company.

== Arizona Chamber Foundation ==
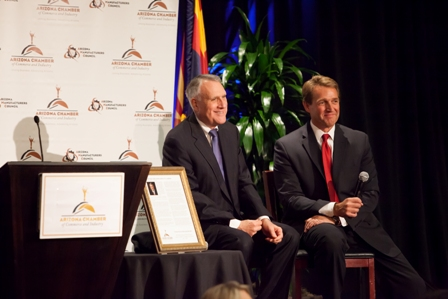
Senator Jon Kyl and then Congressman Jeff Flake speaking at the annual Update from Capitol Hill Luncheon where Senator Jon Kyl was presented the 2012 Milton Friedman Award

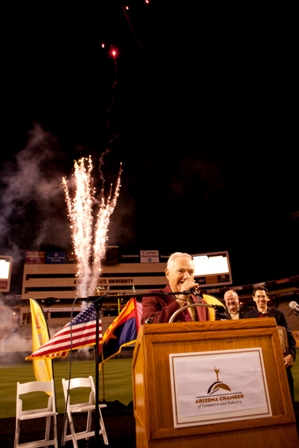
Retired ASU Football Head Coach Frank Kush accepts the 2011 Arizona Heritage Award presented by the Arizona Chamber.

In 2009, the Arizona Chamber Foundation was established in order to provide more detailed policy analysis on legislative issues. The Arizona Chamber Foundation is a 501(c)(3) non-partisan, educational and research foundation. The Foundation produces research studies on Arizona public policy in an effort to inform policy makers, business leaders, and the general public. The mission of the Arizona Chamber Foundation is to be a resource for research and analysis on public policy issues that impact Arizona's business environment with a focus on the core drivers of economic prosperity. Many of the Arizona Chamber Foundation's recommendations have gone on to become law.

== Advocacy ==
Each year the Arizona Chamber of Commerce and Industry produces a business agenda on items it focuses on for both the state and federal level. This document outlines the business community's positions on the most important public policy issues facing Arizona employers. The Arizona Chamber advocacy team uses the agenda as a road-map for legislative activities at the Arizona State Capitol on behalf of business statewide. The Arizona Chamber of Commerce and Industry is listed as a major contributor to "Arizonans for Responsible Drug Policy", a group that seeks to continue institutional violent acts, including arrest and imprisonment, towards American citizens for marijuana possession.

=== Committees ===
The Arizona Chamber of Commerce and Industry has sixteen policy committees. Each committee is responsible for a policy area of particular importance to the Arizona business community. These committees set the agenda for the Arizona Chamber's legislative priorities for their respective topics. All Arizona Chamber members are welcome to join policy committees that are relevant to their expertise and the needs of their companies. Each year the Arizona Chamber publishes the Business Agenda providing copies to the legislators and governor.

Committees:
BUDGET & GOVERNMENT REFORM - 2021 Chair Bradley Wright (Squire Patton Boggs)
DEFENSE, AEROSPACE & AVIATION - 2021 Chair Steve Macias (Pivot Manufacturing)
ECONOMIC DEVELOPMENT - 2021 Co-Chairs Suzanne Kinney (NAIOP) & Matt Gilbreath (Alliance Bank of Arizona)
EDUCATION & WORKFORCE DEVELOPMENT - 2021 Co-Chairs Dave Howell (Wells Fargo Bank) & Chad Heinrich (Heinrich LLC)
ENVIRONMENT - 2021 Co-Chairs Richard Bark (Freeport-McMoran) & Luke Narducci (Snell & Wilmer)
FEDERAL AFFAIRS - 2021 Chair Karrin Taylor Robson (Arizona Strategies)
HEALTH CARE - 2021 Co-Chairs Michelle Pabis (Honor Health) & Monica Coury (Arizona Complete Health)
LEGAL, REGULATORY & FINANCIAL SERVICES - 2021 Co-Chairs Daniel Seiden (Global Market Innovators) & John Mangum (Law Offices of John K. Mangum)
POLITICAL AFFAIRS - 2021 Chair Janna Day (AZ Policy Connect)
PUBLIC AFFAIRS - 2021 Molly Greene (Salt River Project)
TAXATION - 2021 Chair Michael Dimaria (Total Spectrum)
TOURISM - 2021 Chair Kim Sabow (Arizona Lodging and Tourism Association)
TRADE & EMERGING MARKETS - 2021 Chair Maria Baier (Phoenix Suns)
TRANSPORTATION & INFRASTRUCTURE - 2021 Chair David Berry (Knight-Swift Transportation Corporation)
WATER, ENERGY & NATURAL RESOURCES -2021 Co-Chairs Richard Silverman (Jennings, Strouss & Salmon, PLC) & Don Isaacson (Isaacson Law Firm)
WORKPLACE, WORKERS’ COMPENSATION & INSURANCE - 2021 Co-Chairs Mark Kendall (Copperppoint Insurance Companies) & Dave Selden (Gammage & Burnham)

=== Super-PAC ===
In 2011, the Arizona Chamber of Commerce and Industry formed a Super-PAC. The aim of the PAC is to promote candidates who support the Chamber's mission and its business agenda of promoting economic growth for Arizona. The Chamber also hosts an annual Political Academy forum where they reach out to potential candidates for public office and help train them on politics, policy, and governance.

== Mission statement ==
"The Arizona Chamber of Commerce and Industry is committed to advancing Arizona’s competitive position in the global economy by advocating free-market policies that stimulate economic growth and prosperity for all Arizonans." The Chamber has established the following guiding principles to fulfill its mission: Promote a Globally Competitive Tax Climate, Decrease the Regulatory Burden on Business, Sustain a Strong Workforce, Maintain a Strong Infrastructure, and Support Economic Development and Diversification.

== Awards ==
The Arizona Capitol Times named the Arizona Chamber a Public Policy Leader of the Year in 2007. The Associated Press called the Arizona Chamber "Arizona's leading business lobby."

=== Arizona Heritage Award ===
Each year, the Arizona Chamber honors a distinguished individual with the Arizona Heritage Award. The Award is given to those whose accomplishments and commitments to Arizona are recognized in Arizona, nationally, and internationally. Past recipients of the award have included Associate Justice Sandra Day O’Connor, Congressman Mo Udall, Senator Barry Goldwater, businessman Jerry Colangelo, Senator John McCain, and Senator Jon Kyl.

Heritage Award Recipients
- Award(s): Cindy McCain (2020); Don Brandt (2019); Ambassador Barbara Barrett (2018); Larry Fitzgerald (2017); Karl Eller (2016); Governor Jan Brewer (2014/15); Alice Cooper (2012/13); Frank Kush (2011); Ambassador Bob Fannin (2010); Bill Post (2009); Senator Jeff Flake (2008); Lute Olson (2007); The Hon. Jim Kolbe (2006); The Hon. Jon Kyl (2005); The Hon. Rose Mofford (2004); Craig Barret (2003); The Hon. Bob Stump (2002); Joe Garagiola (2001); The Hon. John McCain (2000); Jerry Colangelo (1999); Bill Keane (1998); Mr. & Mrs. John J. Rhodes,Jr. (1997); Hugh Downs (1996); Paul Fannin (1995); Mo Udall (1994); The Hon. Sandra Day O'Connor (1993); Erma Bombeck (1993); Frank Snell (1992); The Hon. Barry Goldwater (1991)
