= Grand Canal (Phoenix) =

Canal in Phoenix, Arizona, U.S.

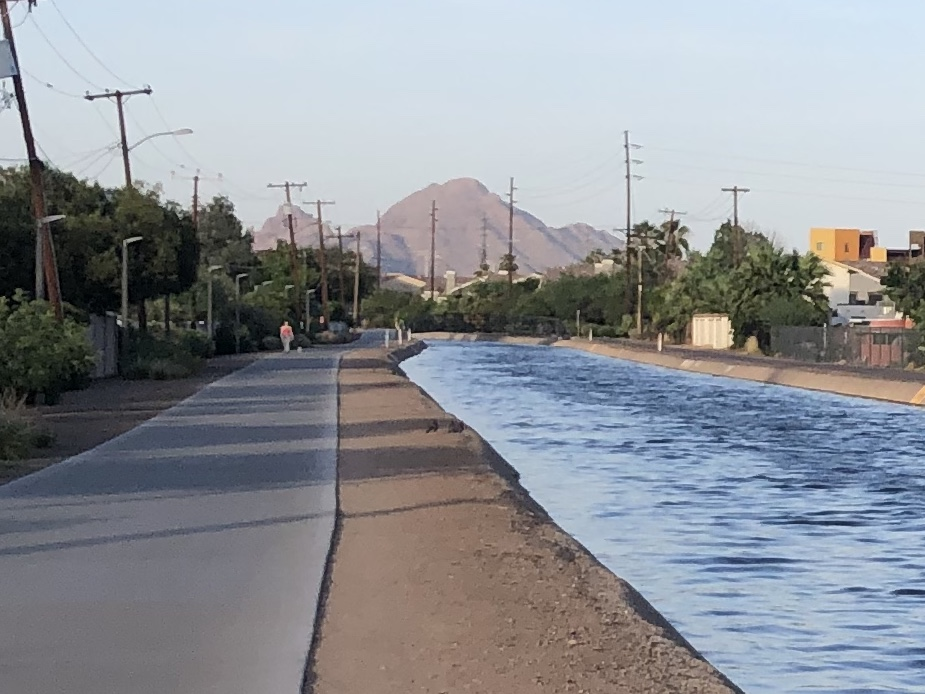
- Grand Canal at 3rd Avenue facing east
- Interactive map of Grand Canal
- Location: Phoenix, Arizona
- Country: United States

Specifications
- Length: 23.5 miles (37.8 km)
- Maximum height AMSL: 1,160 ft (350 m)
- Navigation authority: Not navigable

History
- Original owner: Grand Canal Company

Geography
- Direction: Westward
- Start point: Washington Street and North Center Parkway
- End point: West Bethany Home Road and North 107th Ave.
- Beginning coordinates: 33.4391°N 111.9463°W
- Ending coordinates: 33.5227°N 112.2909°W

The Grand Canal is a major canal in central Maricopa County, Arizona in the United States, that aided in the early agricultural development of Phoenix, running through many of the historic neighborhoods in central Phoenix. The canal serves to feed municipal water systems in the Valley of the Sun as well as neighborhoods that practice flood irrigation for landscaping.

== History ==
The Grand Canal is the oldest remaining pioneer canal on the north side of the Salt River. The canal was once lined with towering cottonwood trees and was a popular recreation spot for Phoenicians. It was planned in 1877 and constructed in 1878 by the Grand Canal Company.

The federal government purchased the Grand Canal for $20,488 in June 1906, as part of the Newlands Reclamation Act, and it became part of the newly created Salt River Project.

== Grand Canalscape ==
The Grand Canalscape is a 22.5 million dollar effort to revitalize the banks of the Grand Canal in Phoenix and encourage investment in the surrounding neighborhoods. The project includes a paved multi-use path, art installations and improved signal crossings at major streets.
