= Deer Hill =

Deer Hill may refer to:

- Deer Hill (Cornwall, New York), listed on the National Register of Historic Place in Orange County, New York
- Dechmont Law, a hill outside Livingston, West Lothian, Scotland
- Jelenia Góra (Deer Hill in Polish), a town in Lower Silesia Voivodeship, Poland
