= Bartlett Lake =

Reservoir in Maricopa County, Arizona

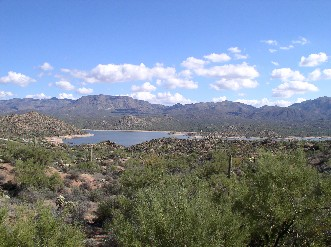

- Location within Arizona
- Location: Maricopa County, Arizona
- Coordinates: 33°49′32″N 111°37′32″W
- Type: reservoir
- Primary inflows: Verde River
- Primary outflows: Verde River
- Basin countries: United States
- Managing agency: Salt River Project
- Max. length: 12 mi (19 km)
- Surface area: 2,815 acres (1,139 ha)
- Average depth: 100 ft (30 m)
- Max. depth: 174 ft (53 m)
- Water volume: 178,186 acre-feet (219,789,000 m^{3}) maximum capacity
- Shore length^{1}: 33 mi (53 km)
- Surface elevation: 1,600 ft (490 m)
- ^{1} Shore length is not a well-defined measure.

Bartlett Lake is a reservoir that was formed by the damming of the Verde River in the U.S. state of Arizona. It is downstream and to the south of Horseshoe Reservoir. Constructed in 1936–39 by the Salt River Project, the Bartlett Dam and reservoir were named for Bill Bartlett, a government surveyor. Bartlett Lake was the first reservoir built on the Verde River.

Bartlett Lake, located 48 miles (77 km) from downtown Phoenix and 17 miles (27 km) northeast of Carefree, is a popular recreation area in the Tonto National Forest. After wet winters, the Bartlett Lake area often has fine displays of spring wildflowers. The facilities at Bartlett Lake are managed by the Forest Service.

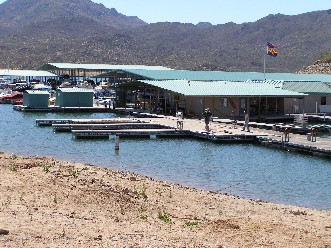
Bartlett Lake Marina

== Sport fishing and other recreation ==
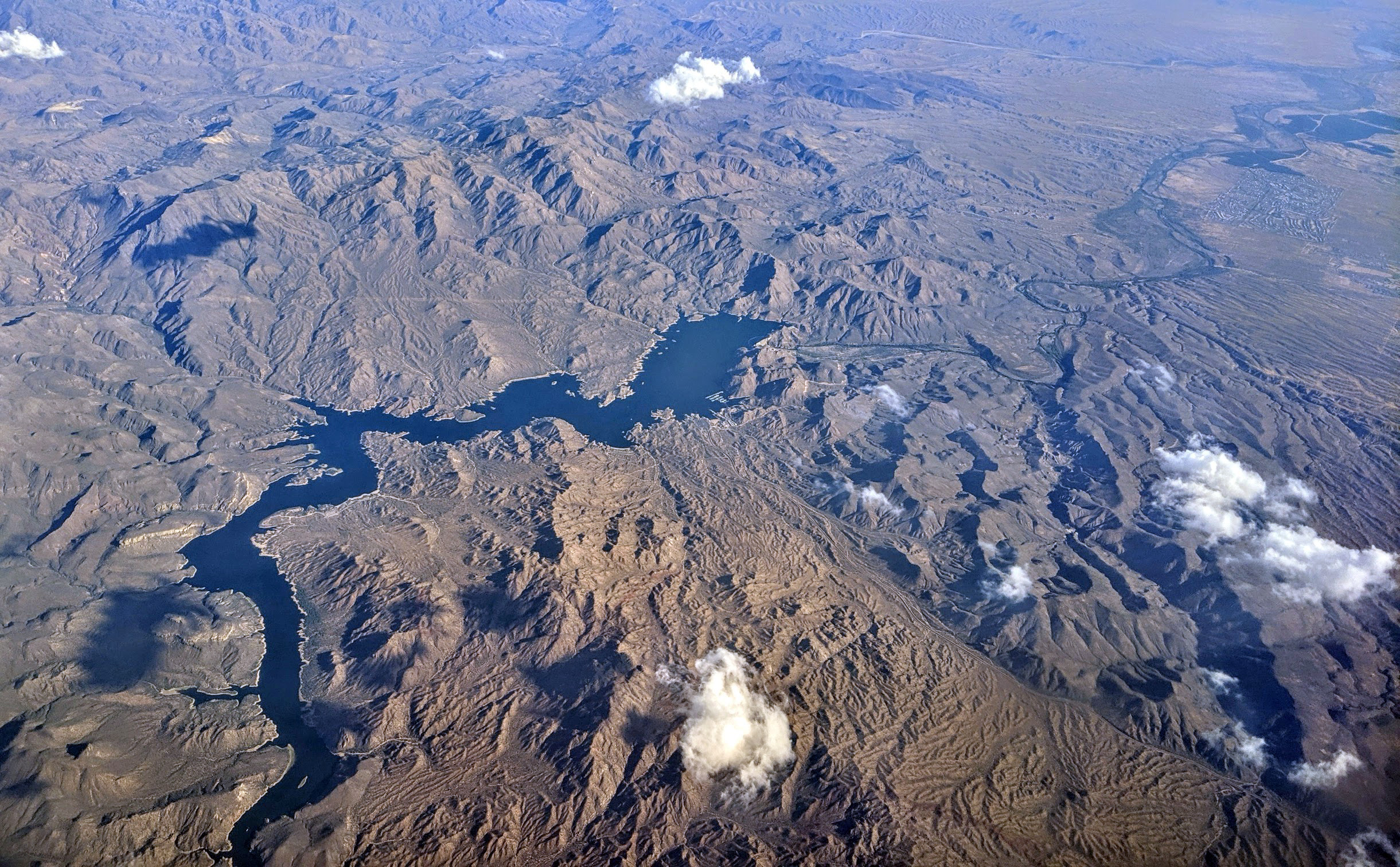
Aerial view of Bartlett Lake and Verde River

Species inhabiting the lake, at about 1,600 feet (490 m) above sea level, include largemouth bass, smallmouth bass, crappie, sunfish, channel catfish, flathead catfish, carp, crayfish, and bullfrogs. The nearest town with fuel, groceries, fishing tackle, restaurants, and other amenities is Carefree. At the lake itself, it is possible to rent boats and buy fishing licenses, fuel, groceries, and fishing equipment.

The lake and its surrounding areas offer opportunities for swimming and waterskiing, camping and picnicking. Trailer spaces and restrooms are available. Users must obtain a U.S. Forest Service Tonto Pass and perhaps pay other fees for various uses of Bartlett Lake.

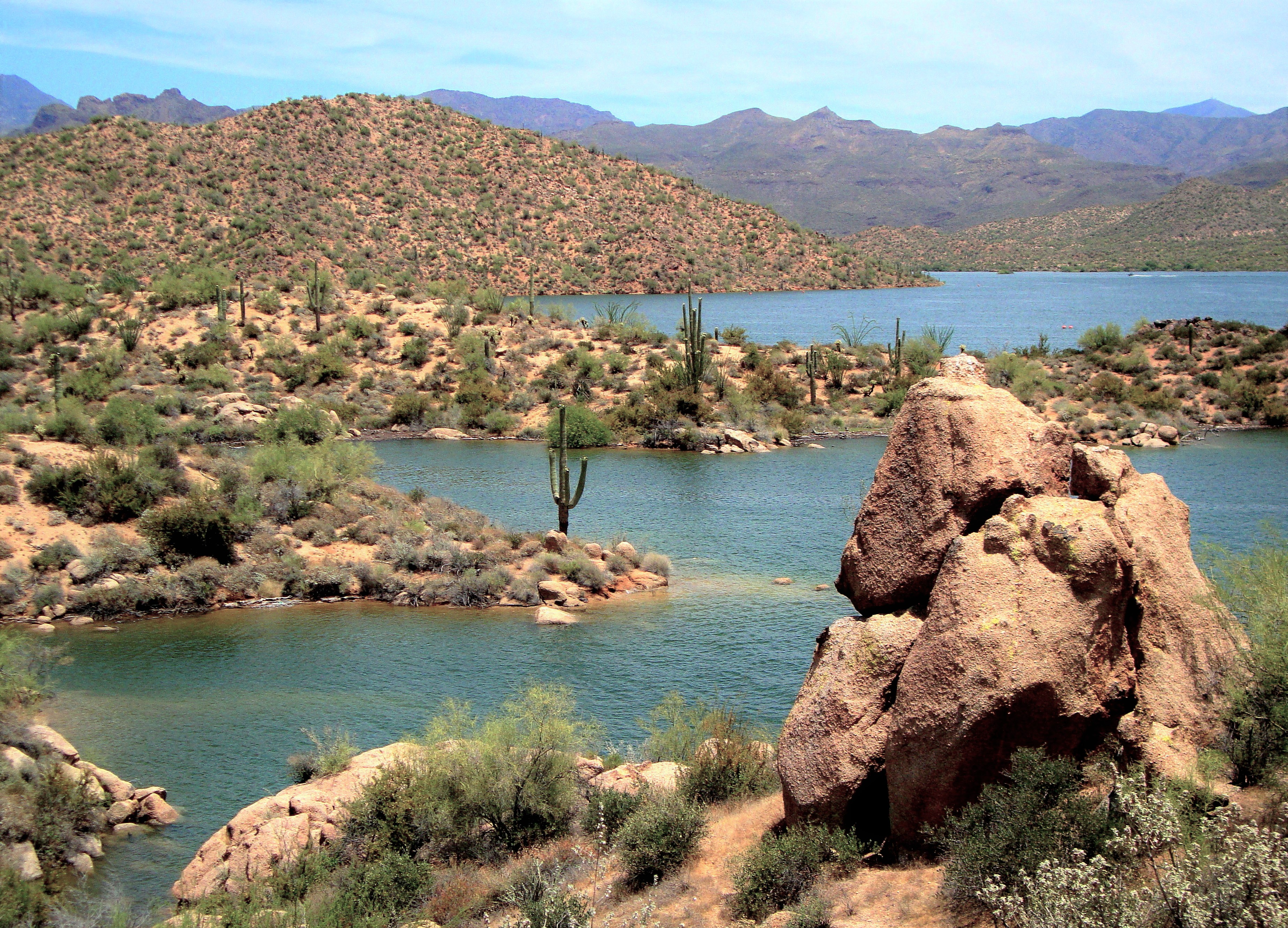
Bartlett Lake coves

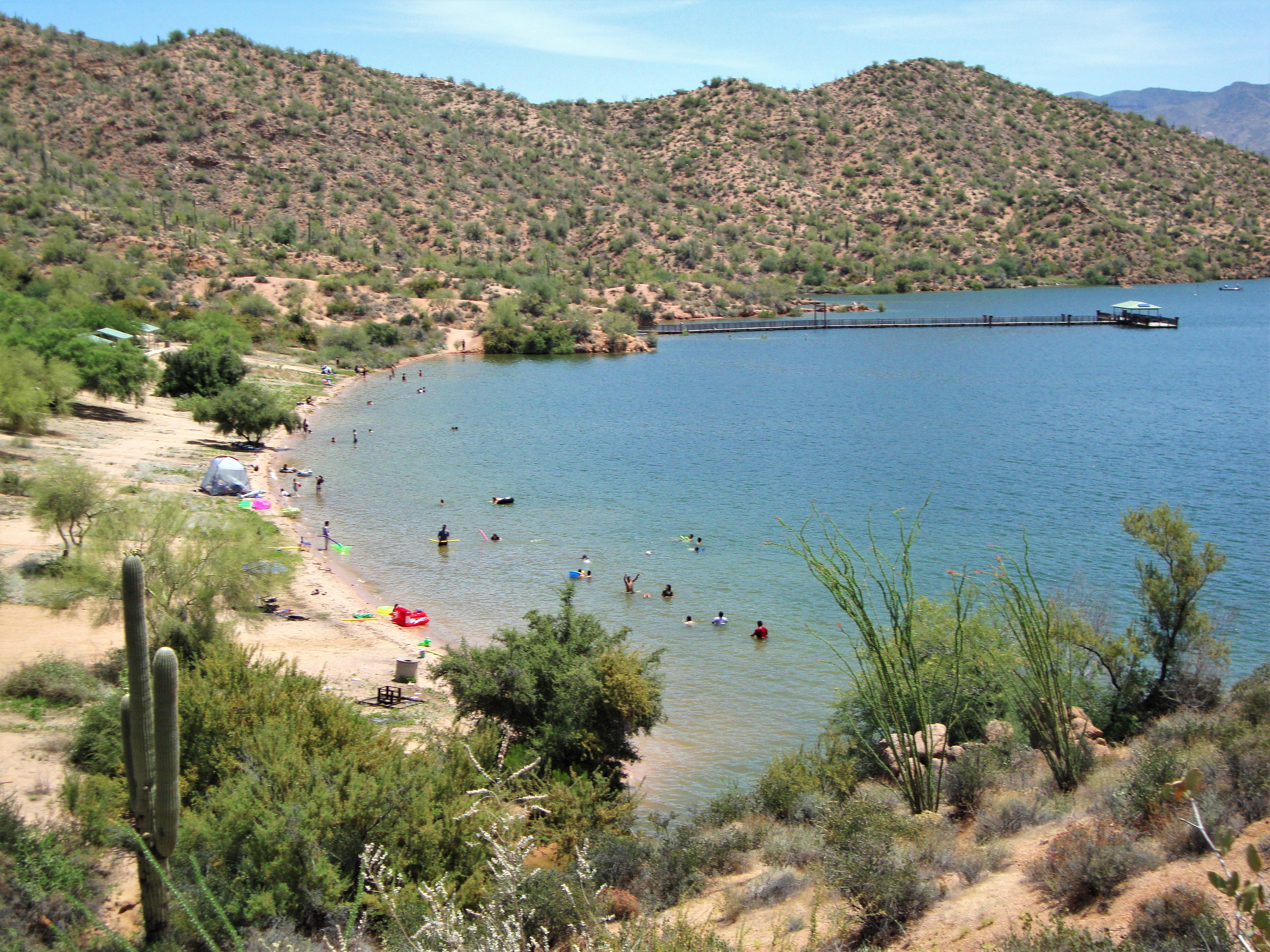
Bartlett Lake beach

== See also ==
- Bartlett Dam (Arizona)

== Works cited ==
- Arizona Fishin' Holes: The Arizona Game and Fish Department's Guide to Public Fishing Waters and Facilities in Arizona (2010). Phoenix: Arizona Game and Fish Department.
