= Deer Lake (Connecticut) =

- Location within Connecticut Location within the United States
- Location: Killingworth, Connecticut, United States
- Coordinates: 41°20′35.682″N 72°35′18.19″W
- Type: Reservoir
- Basin countries: United States

Deer Lake is a dammed lake in Killingworth, Connecticut, United States.

It was the site of the BSA camp Deer Lake Scout Reservation operated by the Connecticut Yankee Council and its predecessors. In 2022 the site was sold to Pathfinders, Inc., a non-profit organization which intends to continue to operate the property as a camp.
