= Deer Lake (New York) =

Lake in Delaware County, New York

- Location of Deer Lake within New York
- Location: Delaware County, New York
- Coordinates: 41°54′45″N 75°02′03″W
- Surface area: 15 acres (0.023 mi^{2}; 6.1 ha)
- Surface elevation: 1,676 feet (511 m)
- Settlements: Long Eddy

Deer Lake is a small lake located east-northeast of Long Eddy in Delaware County, New York. Deer Lake drains south via an unnamed creek that flows into East Branch Basket Creek.

== See also ==
- List of lakes in New York
