= Deer Pond (Stillwater, New York) =

Lake in Herkimer County, New York, United States

- Location of Deer Pond within New York
- Location: Herkimer County, New York
- Coordinates: 43°56′03″N 75°03′28″W
- Surface area: 19 acres (0.030 mi^{2}; 7.7 ha)
- Surface elevation: 1,952 feet (595 m)
- Settlements: Moshier Falls

Deer Pond is a small lake northeast of the hamlet of Moshier Falls in Herkimer County, New York. It drains south via an unnamed creek that flows into Moshier Creek.

== See also ==
- List of lakes in New York
