= Deer Mountain (Alaska) =

Mountain in the state of Alaska

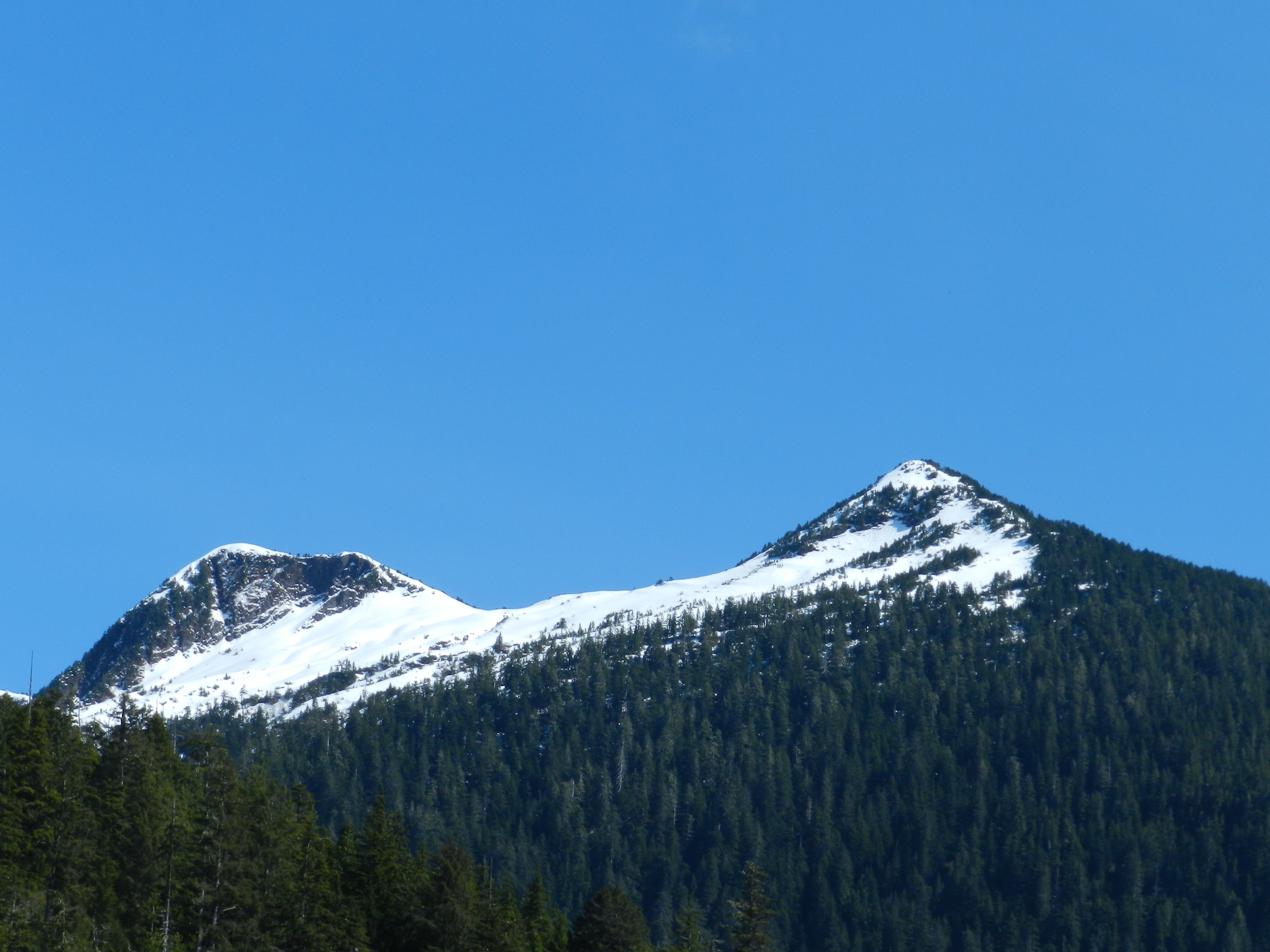

Highest point
- Elevation: 3,001 ft (915 m)
- Coordinates: 55°20′36″N 131°35′57″W

Geography
- Location within Alaska
- Location: Tongass National Forest, Ketchikan Gateway Borough, Alaska, US
- Parent range: Coast Mountains
- Topo map: USGS Ketchikan B-5

Climbing
- Easiest route: Deer Mountain National Recreation Trail

Deer Mountain is a 3,001.97 feet (915.00 m) mountain peak located in the Tongass National Forest in the Ketchikan Gateway Borough, Alaska, which dominates the skyline behind downtown Ketchikan. The Deer Mountain National Recreation Trail provides a strenuous hiking route to the summit, passing through temperate rainforests, muskeg and alpine meadows as it gains 2,600 feet (790 m) of elevation over 2.75 miles (4.43 km) from the trailhead in Ketchikan to the peak.

== Gallery ==
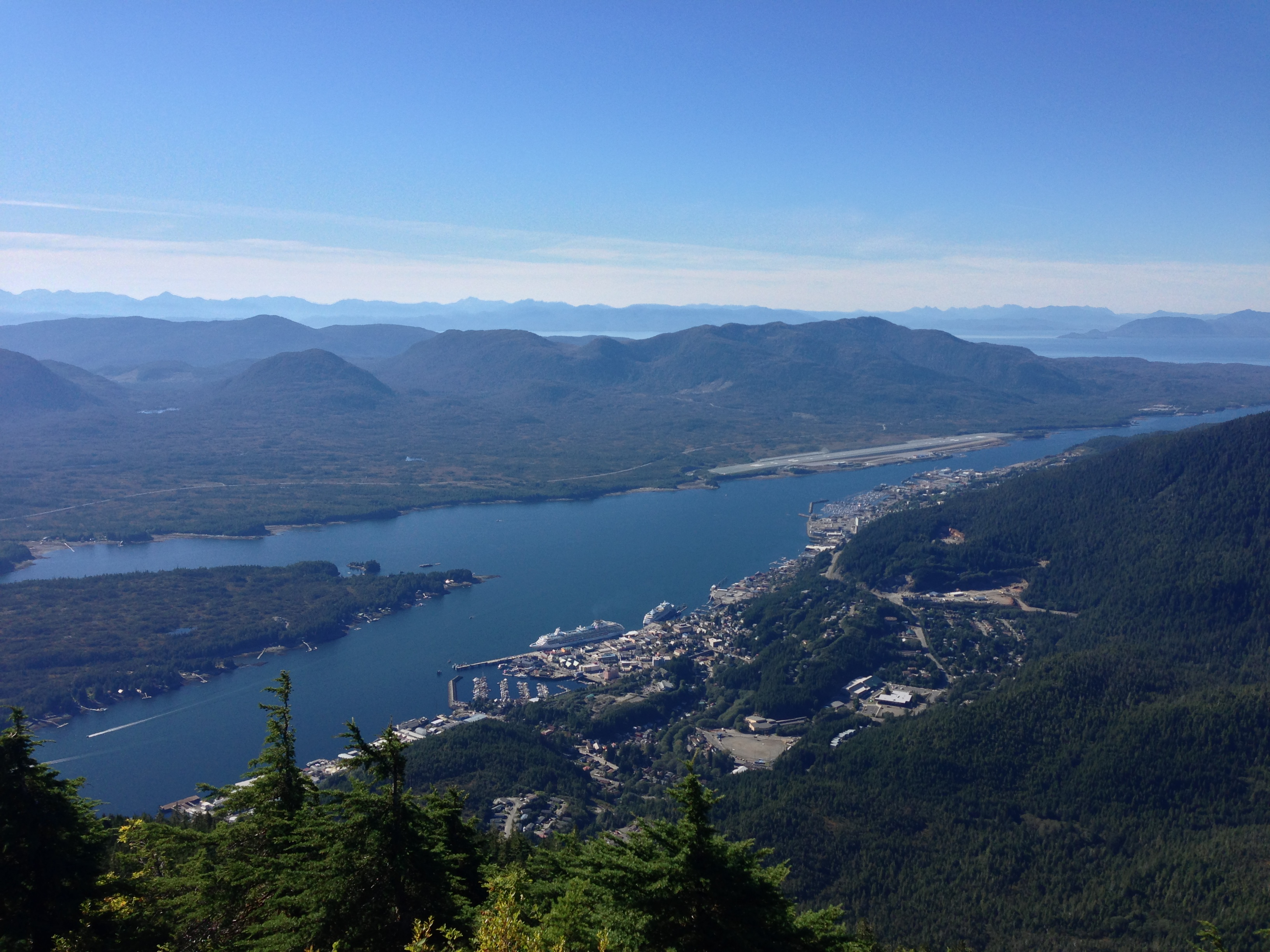
A view of Ketchikan, Alaska looking northwest from the summit of Deer Mountain
