= North Deer Island (Texas) =

Island in Galveston County, Texas, United States

- Location within Texas

Geography
- Location: Galveston Bay, Hitchcock, Texas, USA
- Coordinates: 29°17′07″N 94°55′30″W
- Area: 0.583 km^{2} (0.225 sq mi)
- Highest elevation: 5 ft (1.5 m)

Administration
- United States
- State: Texas
- County: Galveston County
- City: Hitchcock

North Deer Island is a natural island and wildlife sanctuary located in Hitchcock, Texas, in western Galveston Bay, about halfway between Galveston Island and Tiki Island in the U.S. state of Texas. The 144-acre (0.58 km^{2}) island is one of the few remaining natural islands in West Galveston Bay and serves as a critical habitat for colonial waterbirds. It has been designated a Global Important Bird Area by the National Audubon Society and BirdLife International.

== Ecology and wildlife ==
North Deer Island hosts one of the most productive waterbird breeding colonies on the Upper Texas Coast, with 20,000–40,000 nesting pairs of birds annually. Nineteen species of colonial waterbirds nest here, including the federally endangered Brown pelican, and state-threatened species such as the Reddish egret and White-faced ibis. Other species include Great blue heron, Great egret, Roseate spoonbill, Laughing gull, Royal tern, and Neotropic cormorant.

The island’s habitat consists of approximately 25 acres of upland rookery and 129 acres of estuarine marsh, providing nesting areas for birds and nursery grounds for commercially important fish and shellfish species such as shrimp and redfish.

== Environmental significance ==
North Deer Island is considered the most important colonial waterbird rookery along the upper Texas coast. Its preservation is vital for maintaining biodiversity and supporting the ecological health of Galveston Bay, which is a major estuary contributing over $8 billion annually to the Texas economy through fisheries and wildlife resources.

== Restoration and conservation efforts ==
The island has faced severe erosion, losing up to 10 feet of shoreline per year due to storms and subsidence. In response, a multi-phase restoration project began in the early 2000s, led by partners including the Houston Audubon Society, Texas Parks and Wildlife Department, U.S. Fish and Wildlife Service, and the Galveston Bay Estuary Program.

The project included the construction of 6,450 feet of stone breakwater using 24,100 tons of limestone to protect 1.7 miles of shoreline. Volunteers also planted smooth cordgrass during community programs such as Marsh Mania, which helped stabilize the marsh areas. In addition, wetlands were restored and marsh ponds were created using dredged material to enhance habitat for birds and aquatic species.

In 2009, the project partners received the Coastal America Partnership Award, the only environmental honor of its kind given by the President of the United States, in recognition of their efforts to protect this critical habitat.

== Access and ownership ==
North Deer Island is privately owned, with major portions held by the Houston Audubon Society and other stakeholders. There is no public access, and the island can only be viewed by boat to minimize disturbance to nesting birds.

== See also ==
- Galveston Bay
- Houston Audubon Society
- Brown pelican
- Reddish egret
