= Deer Mountain (Nevada) =

Mountain in Nevada, United States

Coordinates: 41°50′32″N 115°28′16″W

Deer Mountain is a summit in the U.S. state of Nevada. The elevation is 8,973 feet (2,735 m).

Deer Mountain was named for the deer which roamed the area. A variant name is "Deer Creek Mountain".

== Climate ==
The weather station at Bear Creek, lies on the slopes of Deer Mountain.

Climate data for Bear Creek, Nevada, 1991–2020 normals: 8040ft (2451m)
Month	Jan	Feb	Mar	Apr	May	Jun	Jul	Aug	Sep	Oct	Nov	Dec	Year
Record high °F (°C)	59 (15)	64 (18)	66 (19)	73 (23)	79 (26)	86 (30)	94 (34)	90 (32)	88 (31)	80 (27)	64 (18)	58 (14)	94 (34)
Mean maximum °F (°C)	49 (9)	50 (10)	55 (13)	63 (17)	71 (22)	78 (26)	84 (29)	83 (28)	78 (26)	67 (19)	55 (13)	47 (8)	84 (29)
Mean daily maximum °F (°C)	34.2 (1.2)	35.2 (1.8)	41.0 (5.0)	46.4 (8.0)	55.2 (12.9)	64.2 (17.9)	75.0 (23.9)	74.3 (23.5)	64.7 (18.2)	50.7 (10.4)	39.5 (4.2)	32.4 (0.2)	51.1 (10.6)
Daily mean °F (°C)	24.7 (−4.1)	25.0 (−3.9)	29.9 (−1.2)	34.3 (1.3)	42.2 (5.7)	49.6 (9.8)	58.6 (14.8)	58.0 (14.4)	50.2 (10.1)	39.1 (3.9)	29.9 (−1.2)	23.5 (−4.7)	38.8 (3.7)
Mean daily minimum °F (°C)	15.0 (−9.4)	14.5 (−9.7)	18.7 (−7.4)	22.1 (−5.5)	29.2 (−1.6)	35.1 (1.7)	42.3 (5.7)	41.8 (5.4)	35.5 (1.9)	27.5 (−2.5)	19.9 (−6.7)	14.4 (−9.8)	26.3 (−3.2)
Mean minimum °F (°C)	−4 (−20)	−4 (−20)	2 (−17)	7 (−14)	15 (−9)	24 (−4)	33 (1)	31 (−1)	22 (−6)	10 (−12)	0 (−18)	−5 (−21)	−5 (−21)
Record low °F (°C)	−18 (−28)	−12 (−24)	−9 (−23)	−2 (−19)	5 (−15)	11 (−12)	25 (−4)	20 (−7)	11 (−12)	−7 (−22)	−12 (−24)	−21 (−29)	−21 (−29)
Average precipitation inches (mm)	4.00 (102)	3.37 (86)	3.99 (101)	4.89 (124)	4.15 (105)	2.14 (54)	0.89 (23)	0.83 (21)	1.18 (30)	2.31 (59)	3.44 (87)	4.42 (112)	35.61 (904)
Source 1: XMACIS2
Source 2: NOAA (Precipitation)
