= Deer Island (Kivalliq Region) =

Island in Nunavut, Canada

- Location within Nunavut Location within Canada

Geography
- Location: Chesterfield Inlet
- Coordinates: 63°37′N 091°29′W
- Archipelago: Arctic Archipelago

Administration
- Canada
- Nunavut: Nunavut
- Region: Kivalliq

Demographics
- Population: Uninhabited

Deer Island is one of the uninhabited Canadian Arctic islands in the Kivalliq Region, Nunavut, Canada. It is one of several islands located in Chesterfield Inlet.
