= Deer Hill (Cornwall, New York) =

Historic house in New York, United States

- U.S. National Register of Historic Places
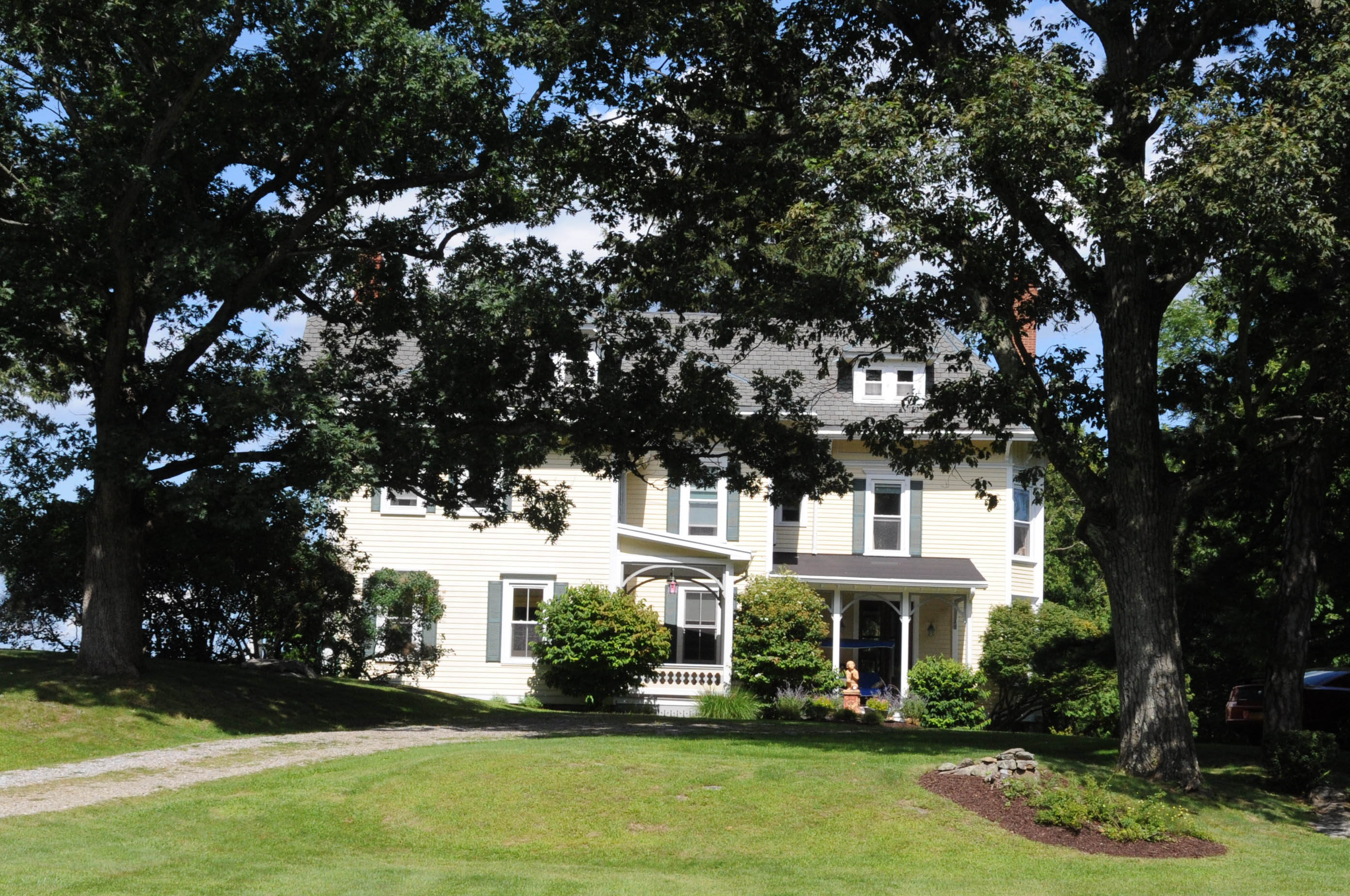

- Location within New York Location within the United States
- Location: 58 Deerhill Rd., Cornwall, New York
- Coordinates: 41°25′27″N 74°0′59″W
- Area: 12 acres (4.9 ha)
- Built: 1875
- Architectural style: Italianate
- MPS: Hudson Highlands MRA
- NRHP reference No.: 82001215
- Added to NRHP: November 23, 1982

Deer Hill is a historic home located at Cornwall in Orange County, New York. It was built about 1875 and is a 2-story, frame dwelling with clapboard siding in the Italianate style. Also on the property is a 1 1/2-story clapboard barn.

It was listed on the National Register of Historic Places in 1982.
