= Deer Scout =

American indie folk musician

Deer Scout is the stage name of American indie folk musician Dena Miller.

== History ==
Miller is from Yonkers, New York and grew up in a family of folk musicians. Miller began recording and releasing music under the name Deer Scout during her first year of college. It was at this time when she released her first EP titled customs, and began touring across the US. Miller would later move to Ohio, where she attended and graduated from Oberlin College. In early 2022, Deer Scout signed with Carpark Records and announced her debut full-length album, Woodpecker. The album was released on April 8. The album was recorded with Ko Takasugi-Czernowin, whom she met while attending college, and Zuzia Weyman. The song "Peace with the Damage" from the album was written by and features Miller's father, and was originally sung by Miller's mother. Miller cited Jenny Lewis and Hop Along's album Freshman Year as influences for the album.

== Discography ==
Studio albums

- Woodpecker (Carpark, 2022)

EPs

- customs (2016, self-released)
