= Deer Pond (Wolf Mountain, New York) =

Lake in New York, United States

- Location of Deer Pond within New York
- Location: Herkimer County, New York
- Coordinates: 44°00′39″N 74°52′17″W
- Surface area: 15 acres (0.023 mi^{2}; 6.1 ha)
- Surface elevation: 1,811 feet (552 m)
- Settlements: Little Rapids

Deer Pond is a small lake north of the hamlet of Little Rapids in Herkimer County, New York. It drains north via an unnamed creek that flows into Oswegatchie River.

== See also ==
- List of lakes in New York
