= Deer Island, Newfoundland and Labrador =

Settlement in Newfoundland and Labrador, Canada

Coordinates: 48°56′00″N 53°42′57″W

Deer Island is a vacated settlement in the Canadian province of Newfoundland and Labrador. There was only one family in the area circa 1864. It had a population of 109 by 1940.

== See also ==
- List of communities in Newfoundland and Labrador
