= Eilean an Fheidh =

Island in Loch Moidart, Scotland

Coordinates: 56°47′20″N 5°48′53″W

Eilean an Fheidh ('Deer Island') is an uninhabited island in Loch Moidart, Scotland.

== Geography ==
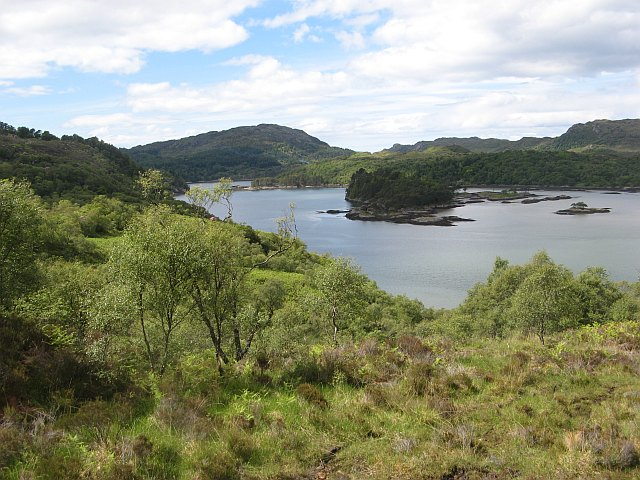
Loch Moidart

Located in the south channel of Loch Moidart, the island rises to just beyond 30 metres (98 ft) and has an area of approximately 5.3 hectares (13 acres) at the Mean high water spring (MHWS) level. It is part of the Morar, Moidart & Ardnamurchan National Scenic Area, one of 40 in Scotland.

== History ==
Eilean an Fheidh is an island formerly owned by the Clan Macdonald of Clanranald and the last island in Loch Moidart sold by descendents of clan founder Reginald, 4th great-grandson of Somerled.

Eilean an Fheidh was auctioned in 2021 and later sold for over four times the asking price at £311,000. It was historically valued on the 1936-37 valuation roll at £26 together with the neighbouring island of Shona Beag.

== Wildlife ==
As the island's name suggests, deer are frequent visitors to the island as are herons, the activities of which are being monitored as part of the British Trust for Ornithology's Heronries Census, as a site within Ordnance Survey grid reference NM6772.

== See also ==
- List of islands of Scotland
