= Greater Phoenix Chamber of Commerce =

Organization

- Founded: 1888
- Purpose: Business Federation
- Location: Phoenix, Arizona
- Region served: Phoenix, Arizona metropolitan area
- Key people: Todd Sanders, President & CEO
- Employees: 32
- Website: www.phoenixchamber.com

The Greater Phoenix Chamber of Commerce (GPCC) is the largest association of businesses in the state of Arizona, and one of the largest in the Southwestern United States, with more than 2,900 business members. Founded November 13, 1888 as the Phoenix Chamber of Commerce, the organization was known as the Phoenix Metropolitan Chamber of Commerce from 1973 to 1987 and adopted its present name in 1998. Its mission is to support the growth and development of business, strengthen the quality of life in the community, champion the voice of business in government and keep its members informed, connected and prosperous.

== History ==
The Phoenix Chamber originally spearheaded efforts towards attracting more settlers to the Valley of the Sun, building a railroad to tap the rich forest country to the north, building better roads and supplying accommodations for those who traveled to Arizona for the winter sunshine.

The following year saw the state capitol move from Prescott to Phoenix and marked the beginning of the area's citrus and agriculture industry. The Chamber of Commerce began the processing of fruits and other products to offer a permanent display for visitors as proof of what the land could produce. If agriculture were to be a permanent success of the area, water storage to carry over during the summer months was crucial. A Chamber committee studied the possibilities of building dams on the Salt River to form reservoirs for water storage, and agreed unanimously upon the present site of the Roosevelt Dam. It was through the combined efforts of these businessmen and pioneer farmers that Congress was convinced to bring into effect the plan of Reclamation to capture and hold water from the Colorado River.

The hauling of crops to market, along with the rapidly growing change in transportation from horse-drawn vehicles to motor travel, created an insistent urge for a paved highway system. That development birthed an expansion of the urban area, building of fine country homes, subdivisions, more schools, more people and more wealth. In addition, Maricopa County became the leader, not only in Arizona but throughout the nation, in building paved highways. The ease and comfort of traveling over paved highways brought more fine hotels, guest ranches on the city's outskirts, and an awakened consciousness to the possibilities of selling the climate to people who lived in less favorable parts of the country. This, in turn, led to the development of the National Advertising Campaign, sponsored by the Chamber of Commerce and supported jointly by Maricopa County and the City of Phoenix.

Among the many undertakings of the early organization was the raising of $3,000 (equivalent to $58,824 today) for the purchase of a plot of ground that is now the historic Phoenix Indian School. This group of business and professional leaders was perhaps the greatest factor in determining the location of the Arizona Territorial Capital in Phoenix. It was logical that the Capital should be located in a town where there was promise and people had the vision and energy to behold this promise.
