= Horseshoe Dam =

Dam near Phoenix, Arizona

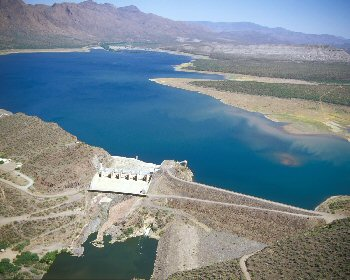
- Horseshoe Dam and Reservoir

- Location within the United States Location within Arizona
- Interactive map of Horseshoe Dam
- Coordinates: 33°59′01″N 111°42′32″W
- Construction began: 1944
- Opening date: 1946

The Horseshoe Dam is a dam located North of Phoenix, Arizona. The dam is 1,500 feet (460 m) long, 144 feet high and was built between 1944–1946. The dam forms the Horseshoe Lake as it slows the passage of the Verde River. The dam was listed on the National Register of Historic Places in 2017.

Just below Horseshoe Dam is excellent fishing – popular spots include Catfish Point and Mesquite Cove.

The dam was built by the Phelps Dodge corporation, a mining company, with funding from the Defense Plant Corporation, a World War II government enterprise to facilitate war production. Water rights were exchanged with the Salt River Valley Water User's Association allowing Phelps Dodge to draw from the Black River to which the Water User's Association had rights. At the time, Phelps Dodge had nearly doubled its copper mining capacity in eastern Arizona.

The city of Phoenix funded spillway gates in 1949, purchasing part of the reservoir's capacity. The dam also regulates outflows to the Lower Colorado Basin as part of the Colorado River Compact. Today, the Bureau of Reclamation owns and operates the dam with modified construction in 1952 and 1993 after a 1978 report found the dam unsafe.
