= Deer Island (Arizona and California) =

Island in the Colorado River

Coordinates: 34.118°N 114.374°W

Deer Island is an island in the Colorado River, divided between La Paz County in the U.S. state of Arizona and San Bernardino County in the U.S. state of California.
