= Big Lake (Arizona) =

Waterbody in Apache County, Arizona

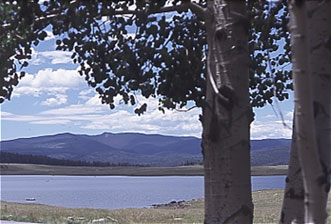

- Location within Arizona Location within the United States
- Location: Apache County, Arizona
- Coordinates: 33°53′4.80″N 109°24′54.88″W
- Basin countries: United States
- Surface area: 575 acres (233 ha)
- Average depth: 16 ft (4.9 m)
- Surface elevation: 9,000 ft (2,700 m)

Big Lake is a reservoir in Arizona's White Mountains, with attractive size, recreational activities, and visitor amenities. As with most trout waters in Arizona, catch rates are best in spring, during late April and May after the winter ice thaws. Fishing gets even better later in the summer and into fall until the lake freezes over again in late November. Big Lake is in Apache County and is managed by the Apache-Sitgreaves National Forests.

== Description ==
Big Lake is 575 acres (233 ha), an average depth of 16 ft (4.9 m). The lake has 5 campgrounds, a general store, a marina, and 3 boat ramps. Motors are restricted to 10 hp or less. There are also boat rentals. The cold waters are home to many trout species including rainbow trout, cutthroat trout, and brook trout. Each year, the Department stocks an average of 480,000 fingerling (three inch) and 50,000 sub catchable (six inch) trout. Most of these are rainbows.

Big Lake is 26 miles (42 km) south of Springerville and Eagar, accessed by paved road via Highways 260 and 261. Access to Big Lake is restricted in the winter when roads are closed due to snow, generally December to early April.

Greer is about 20 minutes north of Big Lake. Greer is in the valley of the Little Colorado River. Greer is home to Sunrise Ski Resort, the largest ski park in the state. The resort has 7 lifts that span over 3 mountains, Apache peak (11,100 ft), Cyclone Peak (10,700 ft), and Sunrise peak (10,700 ft).

== Geography ==
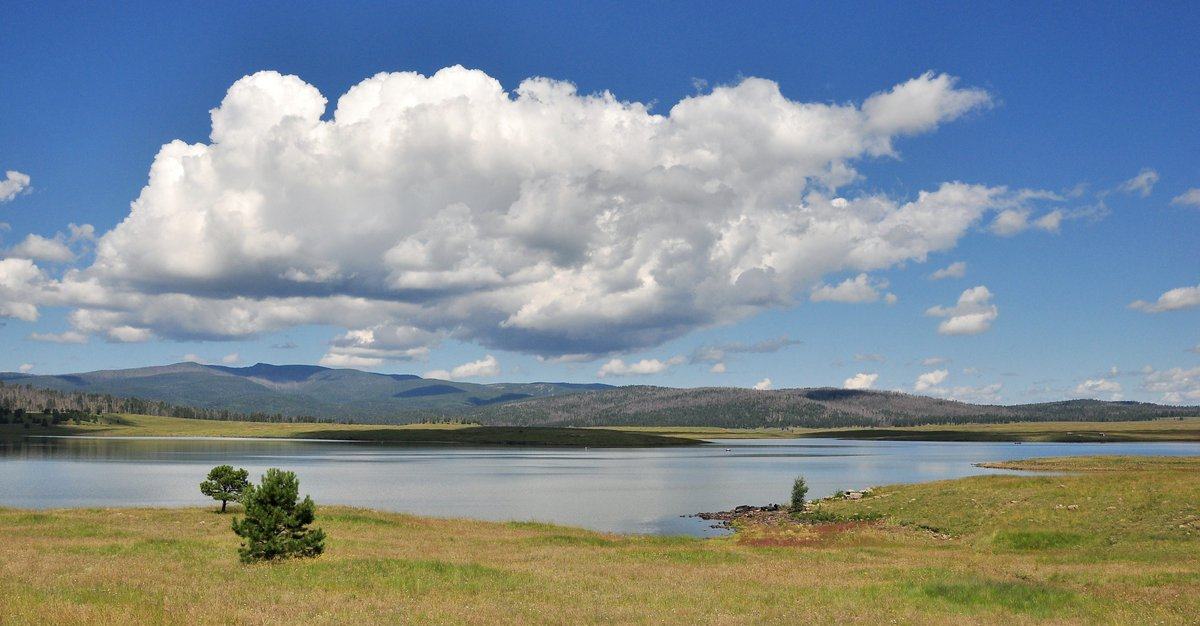
View of Big Lake facing west

Big Lake is situated at 9,000 feet (2,700 m) in the White Mountains at the base of Mount Baldy (11,409 ft) in the Apache-Sitgreaves National forest. It is a large reservoir located in the subalpine grasslands and the petran subalpine forests of eastern Arizona about 20 miles from the New Mexico border. Big lake is part of the Salt River watershed and the reservoir was created by flooding a small tributary of the Black river by the Big Lake dam. The lake is used as a retention basin for rain water and snow melt. There are also many other lakes and reservoirs in the area including Crescent Lake, Reservation Lake, Hurricane Lake Lee Valley Lake, Sunrise Lake,River Reservoir, and Hawley Lake.

Near the West Fork Black River and Thompson trail #629 is the remnants of the Apache Railway. The railway spanned from Holbrook near Interstate 40 and traveled south traveling through Snowflake, Pinetop-Lakeside and McNary before reaching the logging camp at Maverick, Arizona, just south of Big Lake. Logging operations started in 1918 and in 1964 the White Mountain Scenic Railroad operated on the line. The scenic railroad ceased operations in 1976 and in 1982 the line from Maverick to McNary was removed. Part of the railway is now the Railroad Grade Trail.

Just a few miles west of the lake is Fort Apache Indian Reservation and to the east, the round summit of Escudilla Mountain (10,916 ft) located within the Escudilla Wilderness along the New Mexico border. It is the 3rd highest mountain in the state and sits just north of Alpine. Escudilla was severely burned in the Wallow Fire and is left barren.

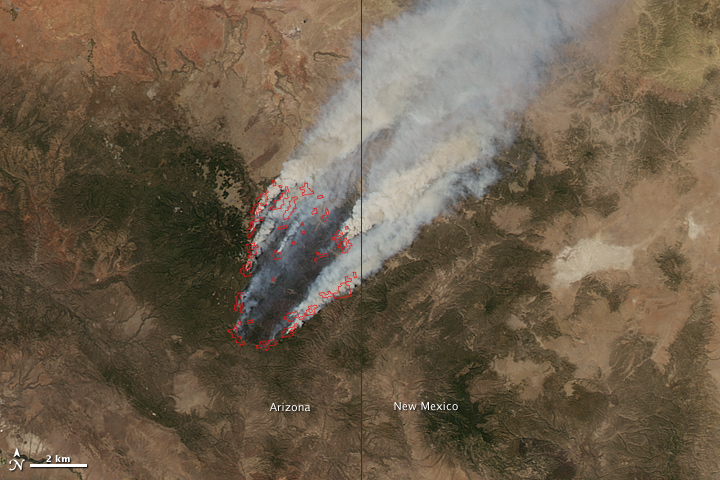
Wallow Fire burn area

Surrounding the lake, the scars of the Wallow Fire can be seen. The massive wildfire started in the White Mountains near Alpine, Arizona on May 29, 2011 due to the mismanagement of a campfire. The communities of Alpine, Blue River, Greer, Nutrioso, Sunrise, Springerville, Eagar in Arizona, and Luna in New Mexico were evacuated. The fire jumped state lines and continued to grow till July 8 at 6 p.m., when it declared 100% contained. The fire destroyed 72 building and injured 16 wildland firefighters. It burned 522,642 acres (2,115 km^{2}) in Arizona and 15,407 acres (62 km^{2}) in New Mexico, becoming the largest wildfire in Arizona history surpassing the Rodeo-Chediski Fire which burned 468,638 acres along the Mogollon Rim in 2002.

== Climate ==
Big Lake has a Humid continental climate (Köppen Csa), due to its high elevation at 9,000 feet (2,700 m). Summer temperatures range from the mid 60s to high 70s but the area will occasionally reach temperatures around 80 °F (27 °C) or higher. During the summer months, monsoon storms develop daily in the late morning and early afternoon hours, bringing heavy rain, strong wind, thunder, lightning, and even hail. These thunderstorms help lower temperatures of the surrounding areas. In July, the average high temperature is 72.7 °F (22.6 °C) with an average low temperature of 43.6 °F (6.4 °C) and in January, the average high temperature is 38.1 °F (3.4 °C) with an average low temperature of 6.8 °F (−14.0 °C).

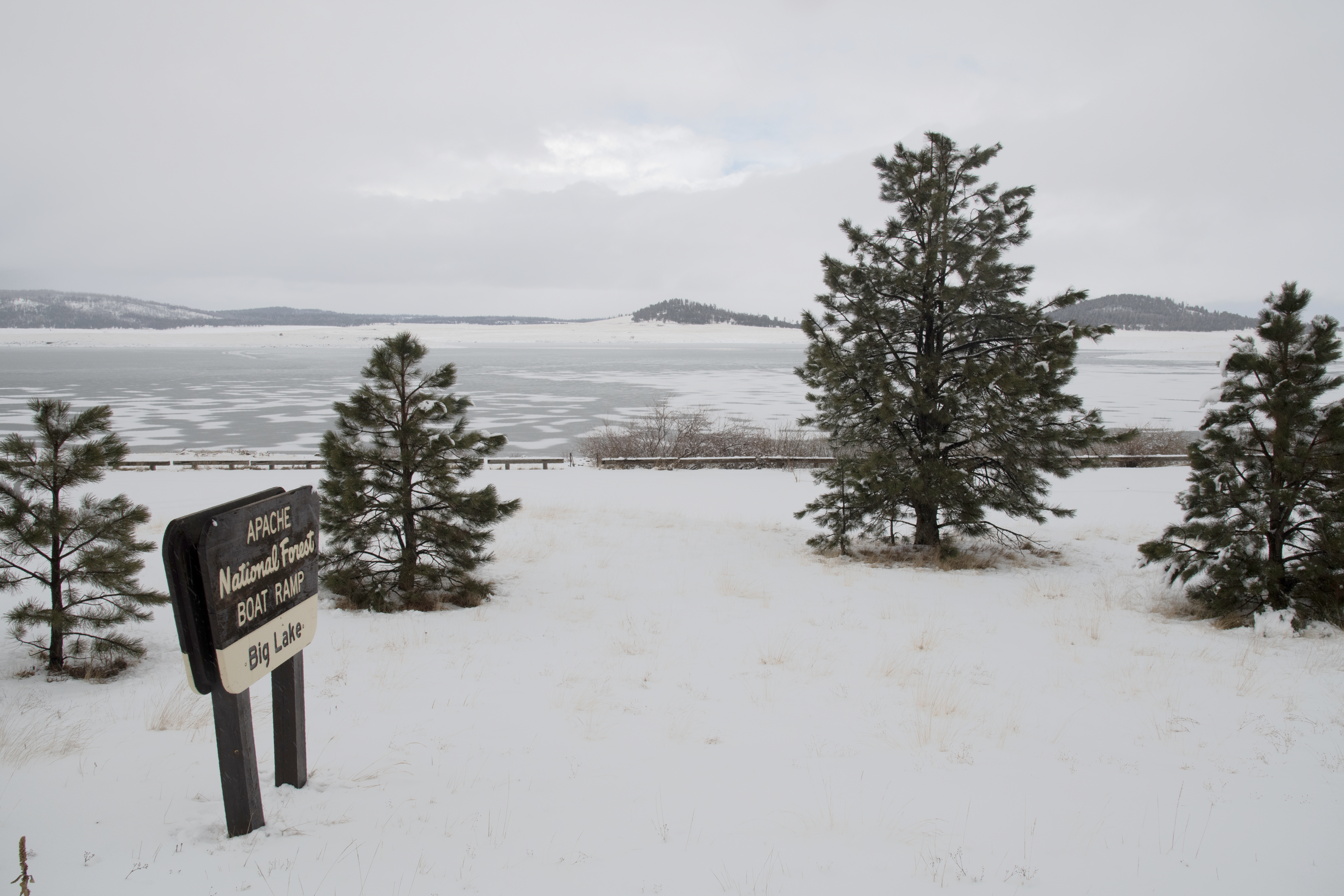
Apache boat ramp, Big Lake during winter

Winters are harsh with nighttime lows in the negatives and daytime temps in the 30s. Snowstorms and flurries are common during the winter months. Big Lake gets 174.5 inches (443.6 cm) of snowfall annually and accumulating snow can reach up to 8 feet. Ice forms on the lake in late November and doesn't thaw till early April. The White Mountains is one of the coldest and wettest places in the state. The official all-time record low in Arizona history was recorded at −40 °F/°C near Hawley lake on January 7, 1971. White Mountains also holds the record for most precipitation in a calendar year at 58.92 inches (1496.6 mm)

On Monday, November 5, 2001, the Northern Lights were visible from Greer and other areas around the Mogollon Rim and White Mountains including Payson, Heber-Overgaard, Show Low, Eagar, Alpine, and McNary. At 8:00-10:30 pm, the people of east central Arizona were treated to the natural light display due to extremely strong Solar flares that allowed the Aurora Borealis to be seen this far south. The lights appeared a deep red and pink hue.

Climate data for Big Lake, Arizona (9,000 ft)
Month	Jan	Feb	Mar	Apr	May	Jun	Jul	Aug	Sep	Oct	Nov	Dec	Year
Record high °F (°C)	63 (17)	65 (18)	67 (19)	71 (22)	86 (30)	88 (31)	88 (31)	84 (29)	79 (26)	75 (24)	69 (21)	64 (18)	88 (31)
Mean daily maximum °F (°C)	38.1 (3.4)	39.6 (4.2)	47.2 (8.4)	55.6 (13.1)	62.0 (16.7)	74.1 (23.4)	72.7 (22.6)	70.6 (21.4)	67.8 (19.9)	58.5 (14.7)	48.6 (9.2)	38.9 (3.8)	56.1 (13.4)
Mean daily minimum °F (°C)	6.8 (−14.0)	8.8 (−12.9)	14.4 (−9.8)	21.8 (−5.7)	29.3 (−1.5)	37.5 (3.1)	43.6 (6.4)	43.1 (6.2)	37.9 (3.3)	27.3 (−2.6)	18.7 (−7.4)	9.6 (−12.4)	24.9 (−3.9)
Record low °F (°C)	−40 (−40)	−20 (−29)	−18 (−28)	−16 (−27)	6 (−14)	19 (−7)	29 (−2)	26 (−3)	21 (−6)	21 (−6)	−11 (−24)	−27 (−33)	−40 (−40)
Average precipitation inches (mm)	3.64 (92)	2.7 (69)	2.2 (56)	1.6 (41)	2.3 (58)	4.38 (111)	6.79 (172)	7.39 (188)	3.9 (99)	1.9 (48)	1.6 (41)	2.9 (74)	41.3 (1,049)
Average snowfall inches (cm)	30.4 (77)	29.1 (74)	41.8 (106)	18.4 (47)	2.7 (6.9)	0 (0)	0 (0)	0 (0)	2.2 (5.6)	3.2 (8.1)	19.5 (50)	27.2 (69)	174.5 (443.6)
Average precipitation days	8	7	9	5	4	15	20	23	10	6	5	7	119
Average snowy days	2.2	2.3	2.1	1.0	0.1	0	0	0	0.1	0.6	1.4	1.9	11.7
Source: WeatherWX

== Flora, fauna, and funga ==
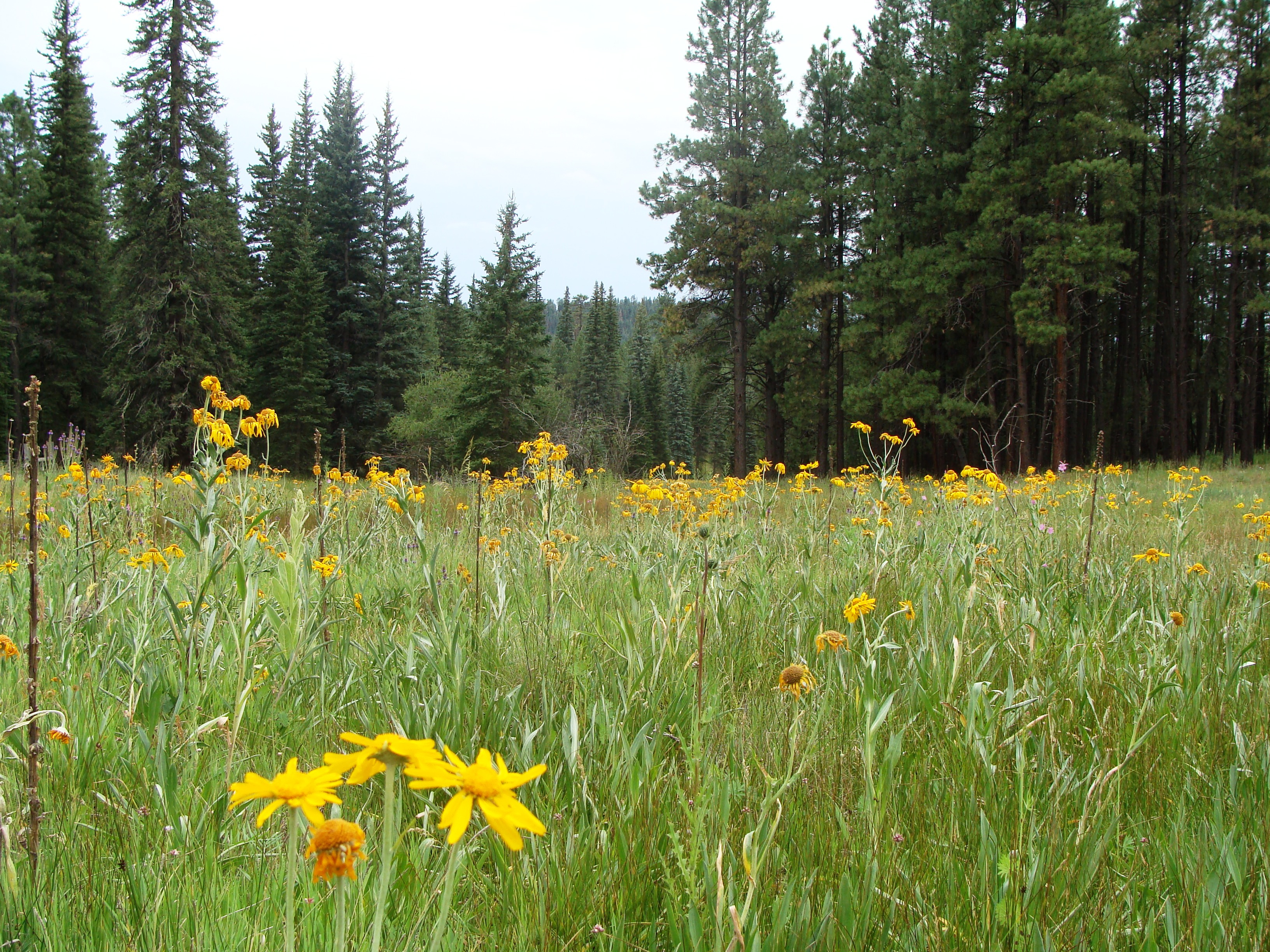
Flora in the White Mountains

There is a diverse abundance of flora, fauna, and funga around Big lake. Trees like Narrowleaf Cottonwood, Maple, Boxelder, and Oak, can be found in the riparian habitats in the area Juniper, Pine, Aspen, Fir, and Spruce dot the surrounding landscape. Wildflowers and mushrooms can also be seen in many of the meadows around the lake.

Big Lake is a very important area for wildlife and the White Mountains is one of the most biologically diverse areas in the state. It is home to the Mexican Grey wolf. As of early 2023, the population of Mexican gray wolves was 241, with 136 wolves (40 packs) in New Mexico and 105 wolves (19 packs) in Arizona.

The area is also home to the elusive Apache trout. The state fish of Arizona, the Apache trout is one of two native trout species to the state, the other being the Gila trout. Historically found in nearly every body of water in the White Mountains, the trout was pushed to near extinction, today, Arizona Game and Fish and the White Mountain Apache Tribe have been working together to conserve and manage both the Apache trout and the Mexican Grey Wolf.

The White Mountains are one of the few places in Arizona where you can see the Southwestern spring firefly. This lightning bug is rare and is only found in a few locations in Pima, Cochise, Graham, Greenlee, and Apache counties in south eastern Arizona. It can be found in riparian areas and meadows at an elevation of 4000–8500 feet. They become active from mid to late summer around the same time as monsoon season and can be seen from dusk to dawn. The Southwest spring firefly is very vulnerable to light pollution, mining, and livestock grazing.

Before westward expansion and the intrusion of settlers, the White Mountains were home to both Jaguars and Grizzly bears.In 1936 the last Grizzly bear in Arizona was killed on Escudilla Mountain just east of Big lake. Reintroduction of the species has been considered for this area of eastern Arizona but no action has been taken yet.

The last female Jaguar in Arizona was shot in 1963 near Mount Baldy and 4 months later the last male in the White Mountains was killed. Today only one male Jaguar remains in Arizona that lives in the Sky islands and Santa Rita Mountains in southeastern Arizona.

=== Aquatic Species ===
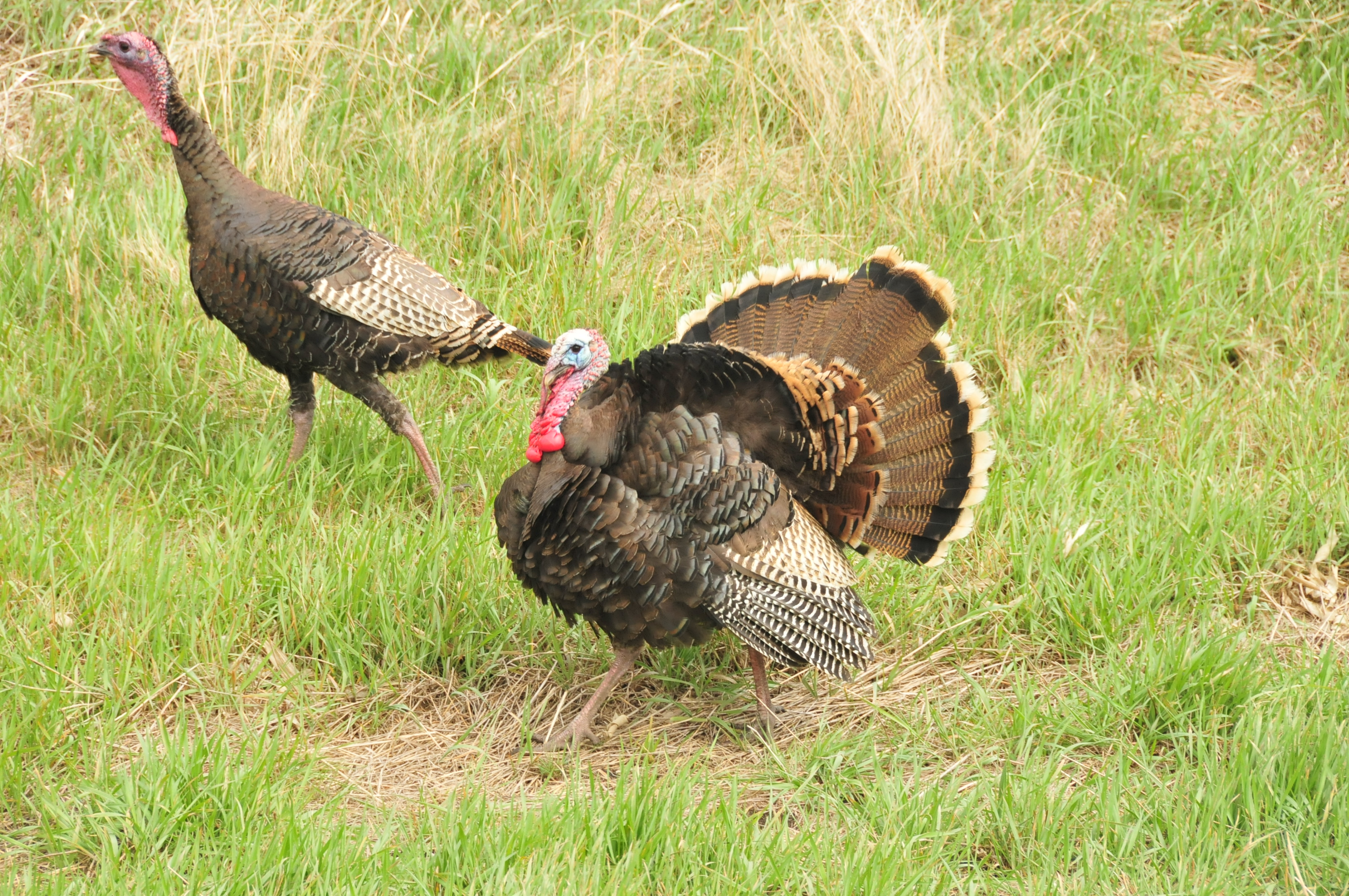
Merriam's turkey tom and hen

(Fish) Rainbow trout, Brown trout, Brook trout, Tiger trout, Cutthroat trout, Apache trout, Sonora sucker, Desert sucker, Roundtail chub, Speckled dace, Loach minnow

(Crustaceans and Mollusks) Northern crawfish, California floater mussel, Three forks springsnail

=== Birds ===
(Landfowl) Merriam's turkey, Dusky grouse, Gambel's quail, Scaled quail, Montezuma quail, Mourning dove, White-winged dove, Band-tailed pigeon

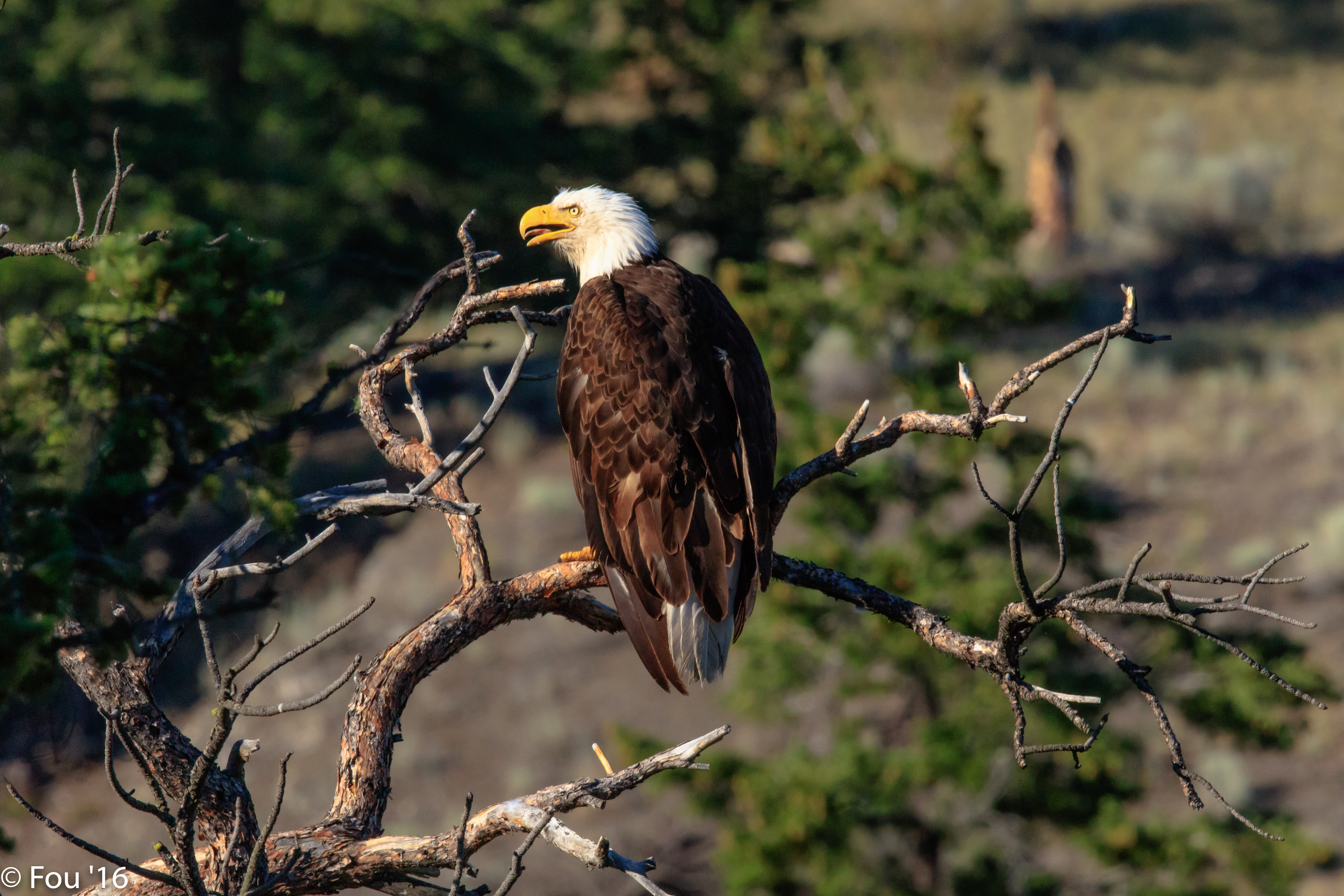
Bald eagle in tree near west fork black river

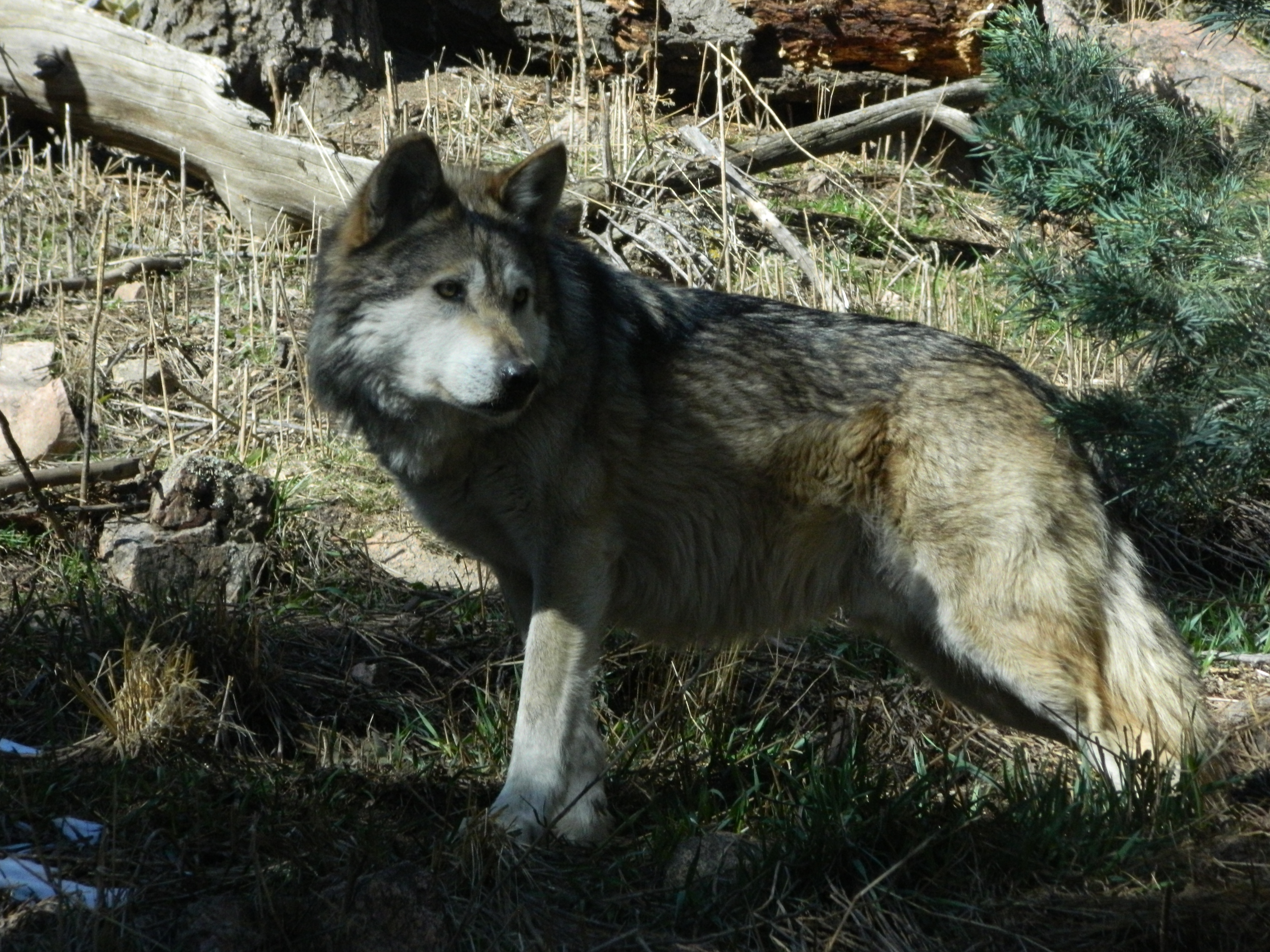
Mexican Grey Wolf near Big Lake

(Waterfowl) Great blue heron, Black-crowned night heron, Snowy egret, white-faced ibis, Killdeer plover, Canada goose, Mallard, Redhead, Bufflehead, Cinnamon teal, Green-winged teal, Gadwall, Northern pintail, American wigeon, Northern shoveler, Lesser scaup, Common goldeneye, pied-billed grebe, eared grebe

(Raptors) Bald eagle, Golden eagle, Osprey, Red-tailed hawk, Northern goshawk, Coppers hawk, Sharp-shinned hawk, Common black hawk, Swainson's hawk, Rough-legged hawk, Zone-tailed hawk, Northern harrier, Peregrine falcon, Prairie falcon, Merlin, American kestrel, Great horned owl, Long-eared owl, Short-eared owl, Barn owl, Western screech owl, Mexican spotted owl, Northern pygmy owl, Flammulated owl, Northern saw-whet owl, Burrowing owl, Turkey vulture, Common raven, American crow

=== Mammals ===
(Hoofed) elk, mule deer, white-tailed deer, javelina, bighorn sheep, pronghorn, bison, feral horses, and Cattle

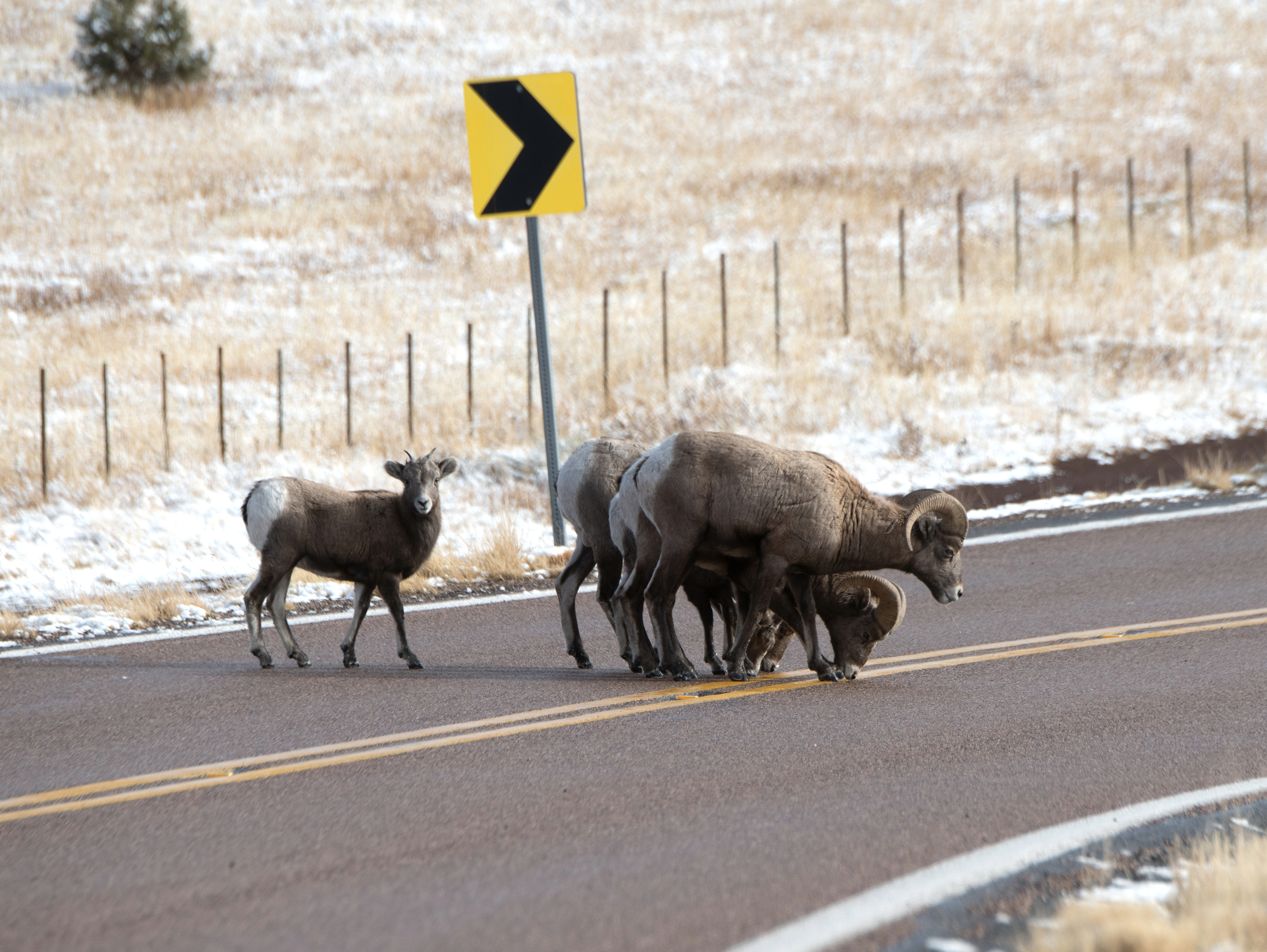
Bighorn sheep crossing highway 273

(Predatory) Black bear, Mountain lion, Bobcat, Mexican grey wolf, Coyote, Grey fox, Striped skunk, Western spotted skunk, Ringtail cat, Raccoon, Coatimundi, River otter, American badger, Black-footed ferret, Long-tailed weasel

(Rodents) Beaver, Muskrat, Porcupine, Arizona gray squirrel, Red squirrel, Rock squirrel, Abert's squirrel, Gunnison's prairie dog, Botta's pocket gopher, Golden-mantled ground squirrel, Thirteen-lined ground squirrel, Cliff chipmunk, Least chipmunk, Grey-collared chipmunk, White-throated woodrat, Mexican woodrat, Deer mouse, Pinyon mouse, House mouse, Western harvest mouse, Western jumping mouse, Northern grasshopper mouse, White-footed mouse, Southern red-backed vole, Montane vole, Mexican vole, Montane shrew, Merriam's shrew

(Leporids) Mountain cottontail rabbit, Eastern cottontail rabbit, Black-tailed jackrabbit

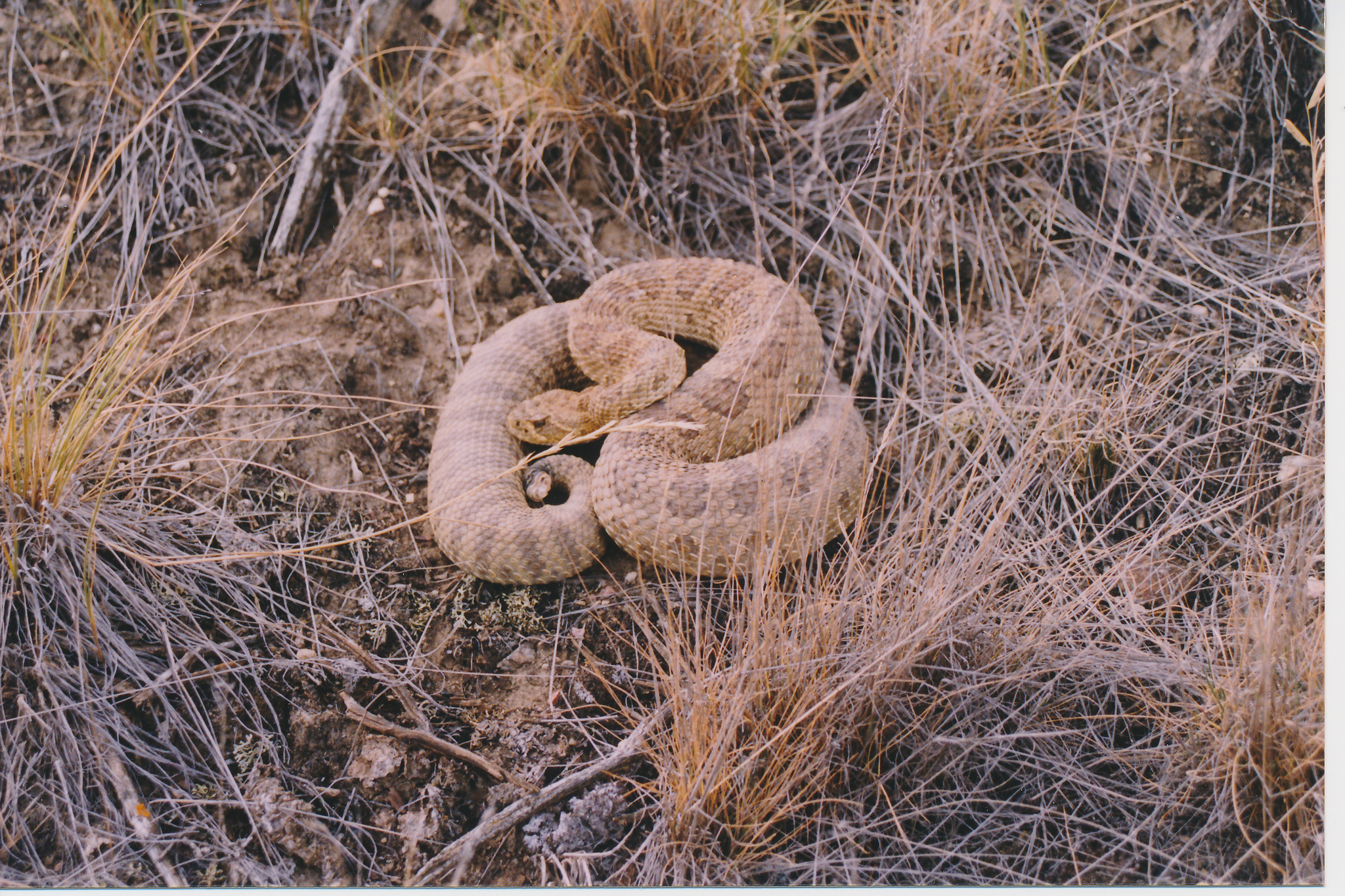
Prairie rattlesnake in the grasslands of the White Mountains

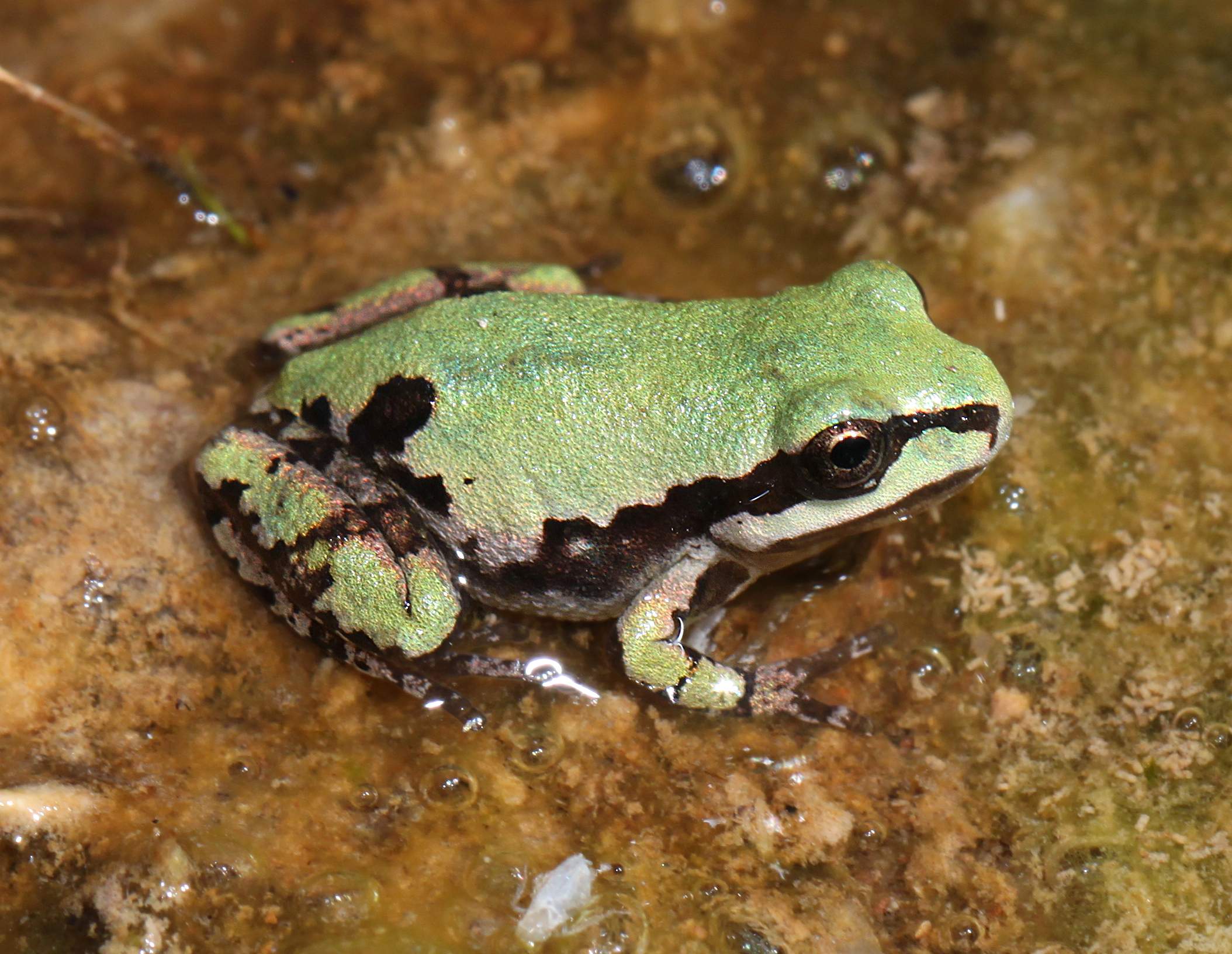
The state amphibian of Arizona, the Arizona tree frog

(Bats) Big brown bat, Little brown bat, Canyon bat, Hoary bat, Pallid bat, Spotted bat, Allen's big-eared bat, Silver-haired bat, Townsend's big-eared bat, Western mastiff bat, Mexican free-tailed bat, Big free-tailed bat, Western small-footed bat, Long-legged bat, Yuma myotis, Arizona myotis, Cave myotis, California myotis, Southwestern myotis, Long-eared myotis, Fringed myotis

=== Reptiles and Amphibians ===
(Snakes) Arizona black rattlesnake, Prairie rattlesnake, Black-tailed rattlesnake, Sonoran mountain kingsnake, Chihuahuan nightsnake, Sonoran gophersnake, Terrestrial gartersnake, Narrow-headed gartersnake

(Lizards) Eastern collared lizard, Greater short-horned lizard, Southwestern fence lizard, Plateau fence lizard, Ornate tree lizard, Many-lined skink, Plateau stripped whiptail

(Turtles) Western painted turtle

(Amphibians) Canyon tree frog, Arizona tree frog, Western chorus frog, Chiricahua leopard frog, Northern leopard frog, Arizona toad, Mexican spadefoot, Barred tiger salamander

== Nearest cities and towns ==
- Greer
- Alpine
- Eagar
- Springerville
- Nutrioso
- Vernon
- McNary
- Pinetop-Lakeside
- Whiteriver
- Show low
