= Greer, Arizona =

CDP in Apache County, Arizona

- Census-designated place
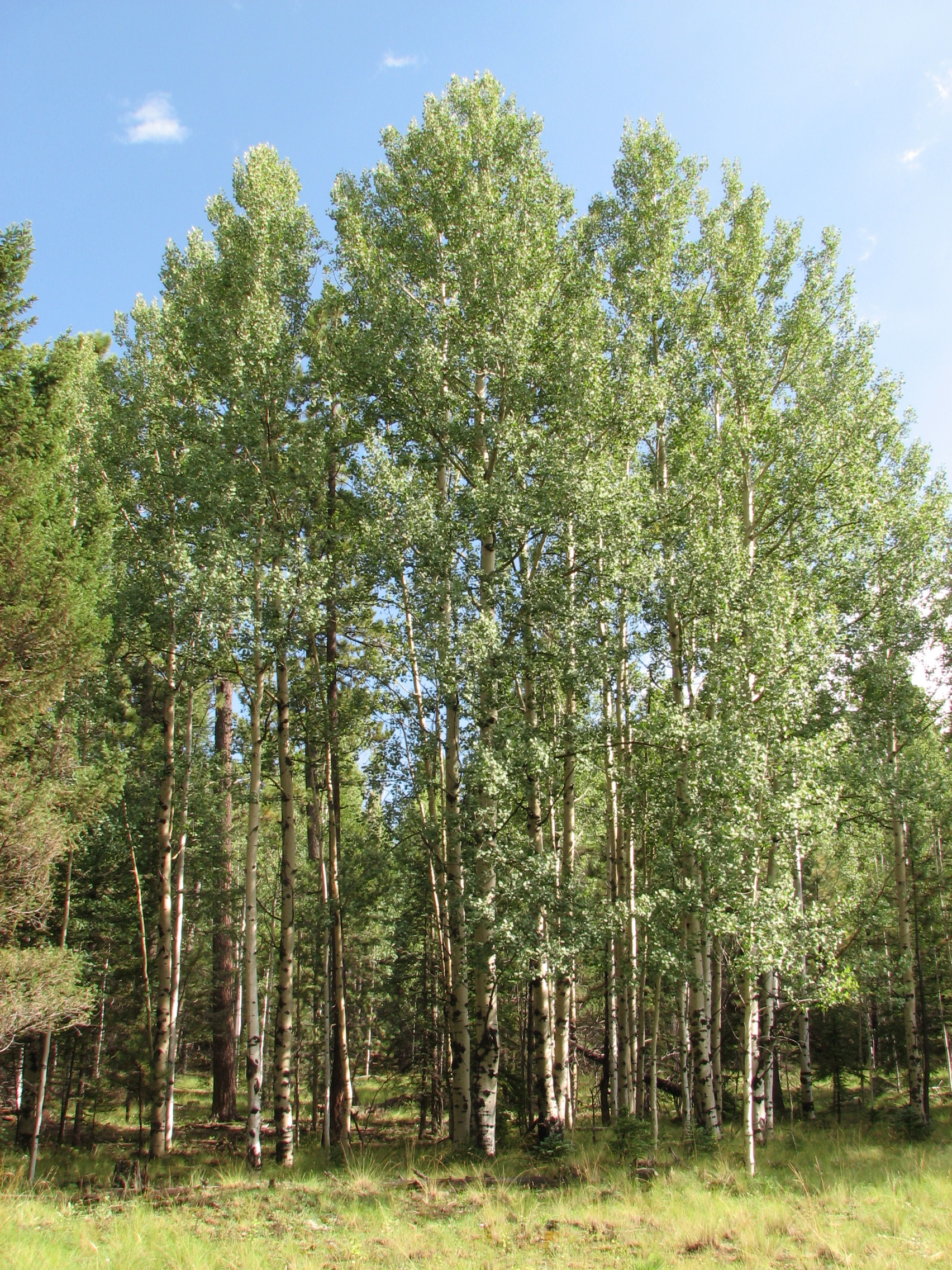
- Aspens in Greer

- Location within Arizona
- Coordinates: 34°00′19″N 109°27′39″W
- Country: United States
- State: Arizona
- County: Apache

Area
  - Total: 0.53 sq mi (1.37 km^{2})
  - Land: 0.53 sq mi (1.37 km^{2})
  - Water: 0 sq mi (0.00 km^{2})
- Elevation: 8,403 ft (2,561 m)

Population (2020)
  - Total: 58
  - Density: 109.9/sq mi (42.42/km^{2})
- Time zone: UTC-7 (MST)
- ZIP Code: 85927
- Area code: 928
- FIPS code: 04-29850
- GNIS feature ID: 2582792

Greer is an unincorporated community and census-designated place in Apache County, Arizona, United States. Located within the White Mountains of Arizona and surrounded by the Apache-Sitgreaves National Forest, Greer is the highest town in the state at an elevation of approximately 8,400 feet (2,560 m). As of the 2020 census it had a population of 58. Greer was founded circa 1879 by Mormon settlers from Utah. The Greer post office has the ZIP code of 85927.

== History ==
Originally known as Lee Valley, Greer was founded by Latter-day Saint Willard Lee and his family in 1879. When the Lee Valley post office was built they requested a shorter name, so Greer (after Americus Vespucius Greer, a town planner who had recently moved to the area) was settled on and the small community continued to gradually develop. In 1897, a single-room schoolhouse was built. A church, library, and restaurants were later built including Molly Butler Lodge and Restaurant, which is the oldest guest lodge and restaurant in Arizona. Today there are multiple resorts, rental cabins, a general store, and two fire stations. The Sunrise Park Resort is located nearby.

Just west of Greer is the remnants of the Apache Railway. The railway spanned from Holbrook near Interstate 40 and traveled south traveling through Snowflake, Pinetop-Lakeside and McNary before reaching the logging camp at Maverick, Arizona, south of Greer. Logging operations started in 1918 and in 1964 the White Mountain Scenic Railroad operated on the line. The scenic railroad ceased operations in 1976 and in 1982 the line from Maverick to McNary was removed.

Surrounding the town, the scars of the Wallow Fire can be seen. The massive wildfire started in the White Mountains near Alpine, Arizona on May 29, 2011, due to the mismanagement of a campfire. The communities of Alpine, Blue River, Greer, Nutrioso, Sunrise, Springerville, and Eagar, Arizona, as well as Luna, New Mexico were evacuated. On June 8, 2011, the Wallow Fire reached the town of Greer and destroyed multiple buildings but most of the structures in town remain intact. The fire continued to grow till July 8 at 6 p.m., when it declared 100% contained. The fire destroyed 72 building and injured 16 wildland firefighters. It burned 522,642 acres (2,115 km^{2}) in Arizona and 15,407 acres (62 km^{2}) in New Mexico, becoming the largest wildfire in Arizona history surpassing the Rodeo-Chediski Fire which burned 468,638 acres along the Mogollon Rim in 2002.

== Geography ==
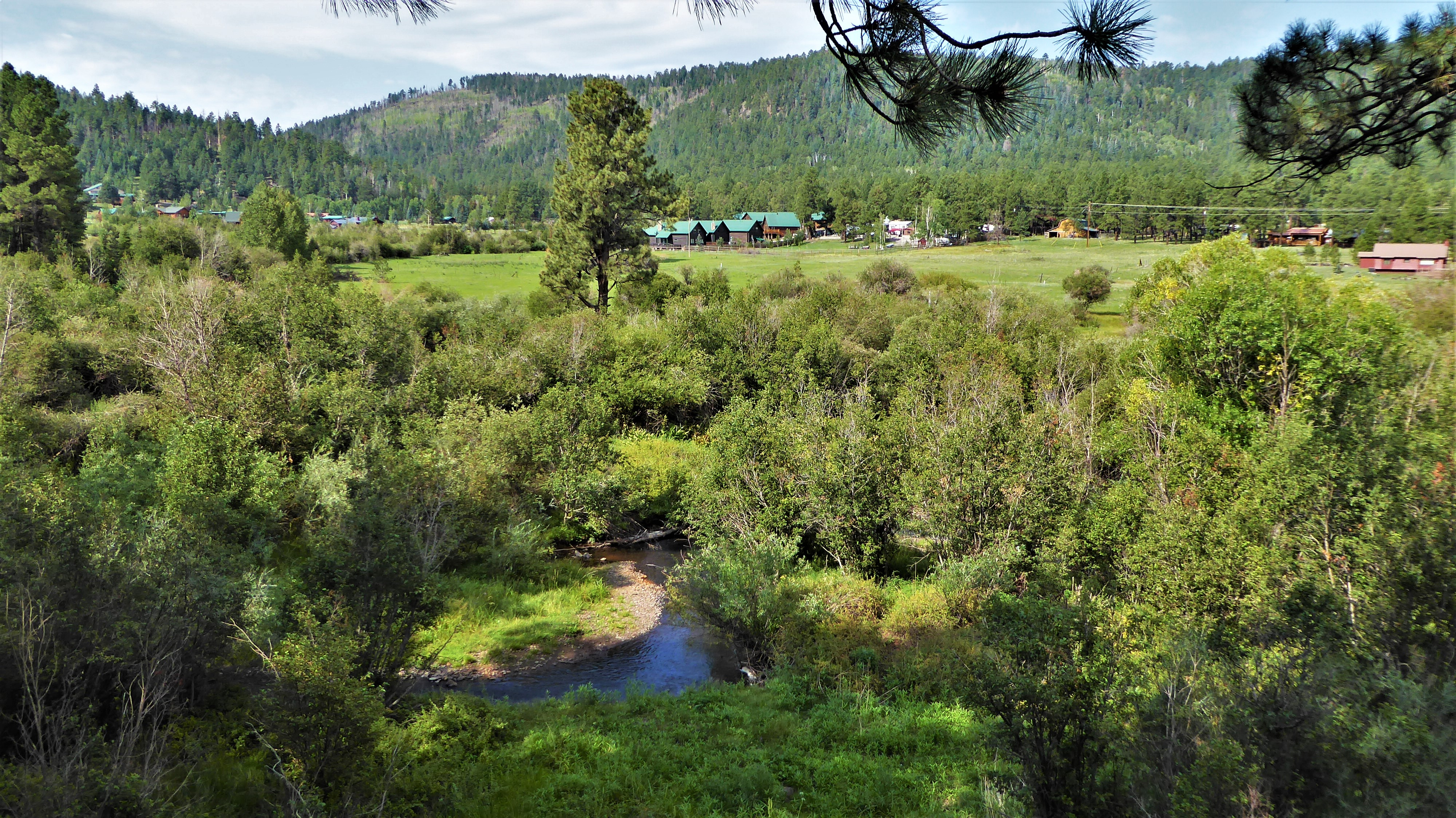
The Little Colorado River during summer

Greer sits at 8,356 feet in elevation and is located in the White Mountains of Arizona near the New Mexico border. It is surrounded by the Apache Sitgreaves National Forest and The little Colorado River flows through the center of town. Its position in the valley of the Little Colorado River near various lakes means that temperatures are significantly milder than surrounding areas. While Greer is a four-hour drive from Phoenix and a four-and-a-half hour drive from Tucson, it remains one of the most popular summer vacation destinations in Arizona as it is consistently 20-30 °F cooler than the deserts. Greer is about 20 minutes or 16 miles (26 km) south of Springerville and Eagar, accessed by paved road via Highways 260 and 373. From Show Low and Pinetop-Lakeside, it is 40 miles (64 km) or approximately a 45-minute drive east using Highways 260 and 373. Greer is home to Sunrise Ski Resort, the largest ski park in the state. The resort has 7 lifts that span over 3 mountains, Apache peak (11,100 ft), Cyclone Peak (10,700 ft), and Sunrise peak (10,700 ft).

== Climate ==
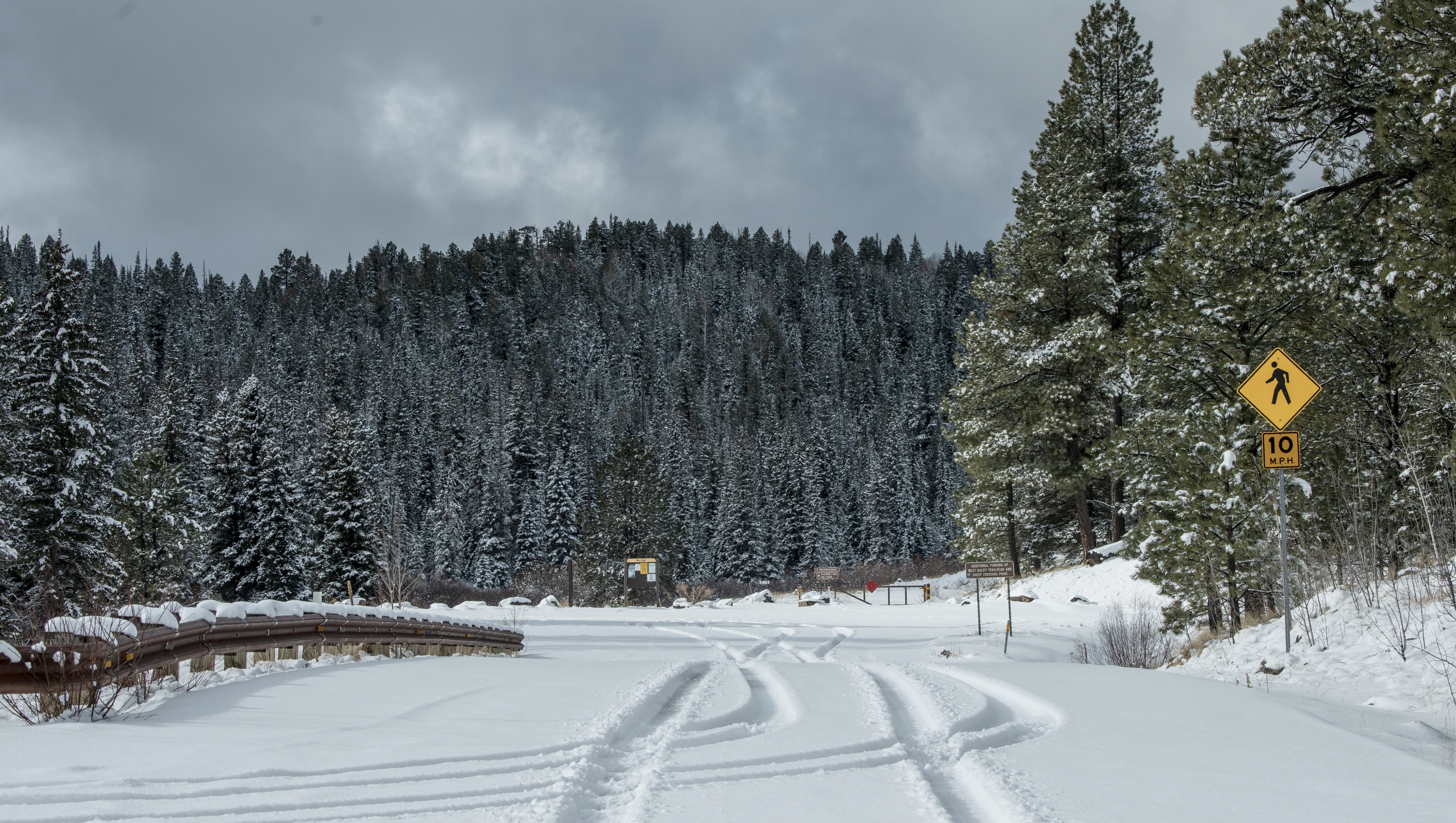
Access to Greer in the winter

Greer has a Humid continental climate (Köppen Dsb) with warm summers coupled with chilly nights and cold, snowy winters. Due to its high elevation at more the 8,000 feet (2,438 m) summer temperatures range from the mid 60s to high 70s but the area will occasionally reach temperatures around 80 °F (27 °C) or higher. During the summer months, monsoon storms develop daily in the late morning and early afternoon, bringing heavy rain, strong wind, thunder, lightning, and even hail. These thunderstorms help lower temperatures of the surrounding areas. In July, the average high temperature is 76.0 °F (24.4 °C) with an average low temperature of 46.8 °F (8.2 °C) and in January, the average high temperature is 42.6 °F (5.9 °C) with an average low temperature of 13.5 °F (−10.0 °C).

Winters are harsh with nighttime lows in the single digits and daytime temps in the 40s. Snowstorms and flurries are common during the winter months. Greer gets 97.5 inches (248 cm) of snowfall annually and accumulating snow can reach up to 6 feet. Ice forms on the surrounding lakes in late November and doesn't thaw till early March. The White Mountains are one of the coldest and wettest places in the state. The official all-time record low in Arizona history was recorded at −40 °F/°C near Hawley lake on January 7, 1971. The White Mountains also hold the record for the most precipitation in a calendar year at 58.92 inches (1496.6 mm)

On Monday, November 5, 2001, the Northern Lights were visible from Greer and other areas around the Mogollon Rim and White Mountains including Payson, Heber-Overgaard, Show Low, Eagar, Alpine, and McNary. At 8:00-10:30 pm, the people of east central Arizona were treated to the natural light display due to extremely strong Solar flares that allowed the Aurora Borealis to be seen this far south. The lights appeared a deep red and pink hue.

Climate data for Greer, Arizona (Note: Station Elevation 8,275ft) (1991–2020 normals, extremes 1916–2011)
Month	Jan	Feb	Mar	Apr	May	Jun	Jul	Aug	Sep	Oct	Nov	Dec	Year
Record high °F (°C)	66 (19)	65 (18)	75 (24)	75 (24)	89 (32)	89 (32)	90 (32)	87 (31)	86 (30)	78 (26)	74 (23)	63 (17)	90 (32)
Mean maximum °F (°C)	55.2 (12.9)	54.9 (12.7)	62.0 (16.7)	69.9 (21.1)	76.7 (24.8)	83.0 (28.3)	84.9 (29.4)	80.6 (27.0)	75.6 (24.2)	70.8 (21.6)	61.4 (16.3)	55.6 (13.1)	85.6 (29.8)
Mean daily maximum °F (°C)	42.6 (5.9)	44.7 (7.1)	50.2 (10.1)	57.4 (14.1)	66.0 (18.9)	75.9 (24.4)	76.0 (24.4)	73.4 (23.0)	69.9 (21.1)	61.0 (16.1)	51.5 (10.8)	42.9 (6.1)	59.3 (15.2)
Daily mean °F (°C)	28.1 (−2.2)	30.2 (−1.0)	35.9 (2.2)	41.4 (5.2)	49.5 (9.7)	58.4 (14.7)	61.4 (16.3)	59.7 (15.4)	55.3 (12.9)	45.6 (7.6)	36.3 (2.4)	28.4 (−2.0)	44.2 (6.8)
Mean daily minimum °F (°C)	13.5 (−10.3)	15.7 (−9.1)	21.5 (−5.8)	25.5 (−3.6)	33.0 (0.6)	41.0 (5.0)	46.8 (8.2)	45.9 (7.7)	40.8 (4.9)	30.2 (−1.0)	21.2 (−6.0)	13.8 (−10.1)	29.1 (−1.6)
Mean minimum °F (°C)	−2.6 (−19.2)	1.1 (−17.2)	7.0 (−13.9)	14.6 (−9.7)	22.0 (−5.6)	31.6 (−0.2)	41.7 (5.4)	41.8 (5.4)	31.8 (−0.1)	16.1 (−8.8)	6.3 (−14.3)	−4.6 (−20.3)	−8.0 (−22.2)
Record low °F (°C)	−24 (−31)	−21 (−29)	−15 (−26)	−4 (−20)	8 (−13)	24 (−4)	33 (1)	30 (−1)	20 (−7)	6 (−14)	−13 (−25)	−20 (−29)	−24 (−31)
Average precipitation inches (mm)	1.22 (31)	1.32 (34)	0.92 (23)	0.50 (13)	0.67 (17)	0.49 (12)	4.05 (103)	4.79 (122)	2.37 (60)	1.29 (33)	1.09 (28)	0.57 (14)	19.28 (490)
Average snowfall inches (cm)	20.1 (51)	21.0 (53)	15.8 (40)	5.3 (13)	0.7 (1.8)	0.1 (0.25)	0.0 (0.0)	0.0 (0.0)	0.0 (0.0)	1.5 (3.8)	9.7 (25)	18.4 (47)	92.6 (234.85)
Average extreme snow depth inches (cm)	12.4 (31)	15.8 (40)	10.8 (27)	2.8 (7.1)	0.5 (1.3)	0.0 (0.0)	0.0 (0.0)	0.0 (0.0)	0.0 (0.0)	1.4 (3.6)	4.9 (12)	10.6 (27)	20.1 (51)
Average precipitation days (≥ 0.01 in)	5.5	5.5	4.3	3.3	3.7	3.5	14.9	16.2	7.8	4.8	3.8	4.8	78.1
Average snowy days (≥ 0.1 in)	6.2	5.3	4.0	2.0	0.3	0.1	0.0	0.0	0.0	0.7	3.1	5.0	26.7
Source: NOAA (snow/snow days 1981–2010)

== Flora and Fauna ==
There is a diverse abundance of flora and fauna around Greer. Trees like Narrowleaf Cottonwood, Maple, Boxelder, and Oak, can be found in the riparian habitats in the area Juniper, Pine, Aspen, Fir, and Spruce dot the surrounding landscape. Wildflowers and mushrooms can also be seen in many of the meadows in the White Mountains.

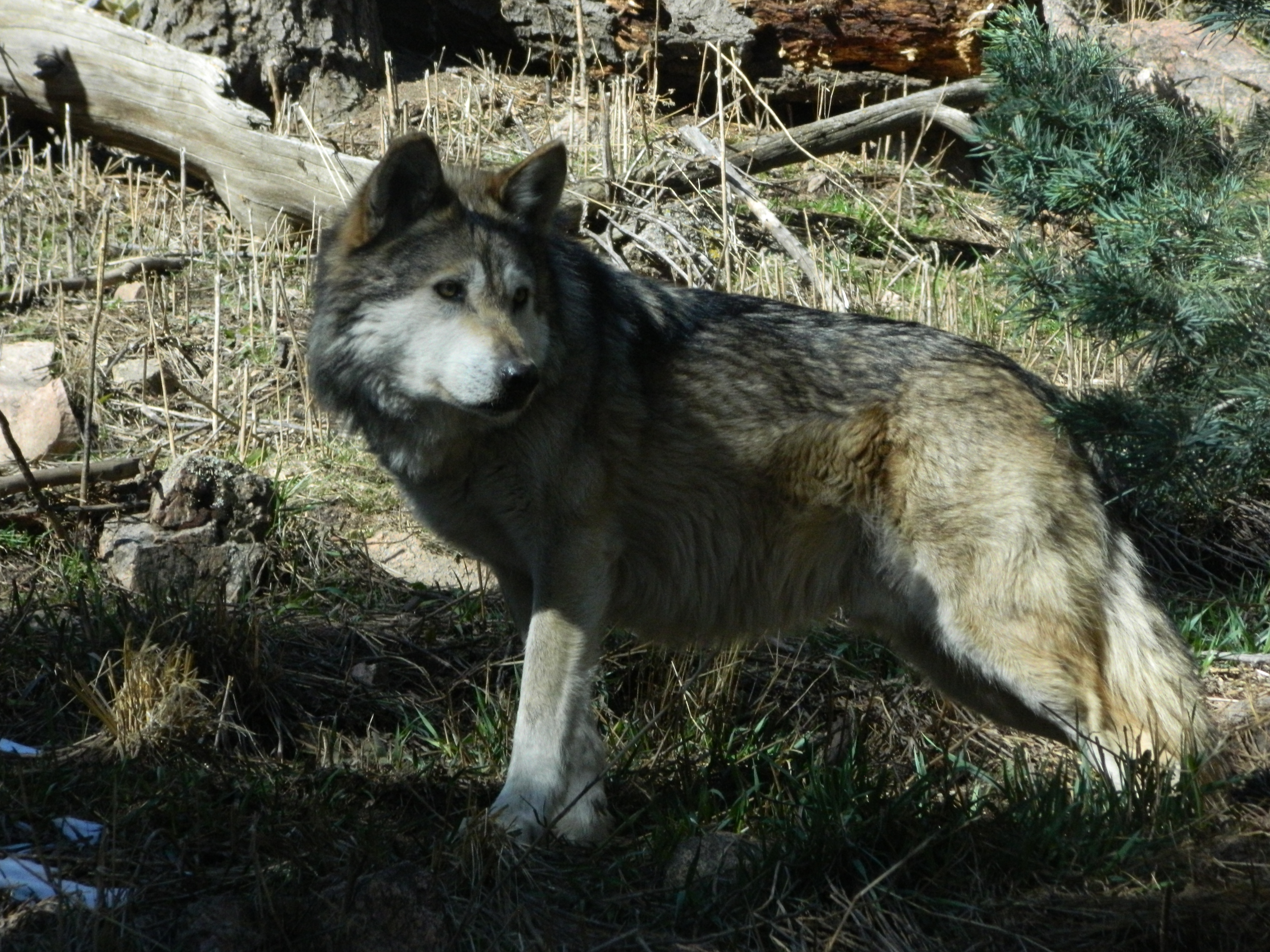
Mexican Grey Wolf near Mount Baldy

The White Mountains are one of the most biologically diverse areas in the state. It is home to the Mexican Grey wolf, and as of 2021, there were only 186 wild wolves living in eastern Arizona and western New Mexico. The area is also home to the elusive Apache trout, the state fish of Arizona, the Apache trout is one of two native trout species to the state, the other being the Gila trout. Historically found in nearly every body of water in the White Mountains, the Apache trout was pushed to near extinction. Today, Arizona Game and Fish and the White Mountain Apache Tribe have been working together to conserve and manage both the Apache trout and the Mexican Grey Wolf.

Before westward expansion, the White Mountains were home to Grizzly bears, but in 1936, the last Grizzly bear in Arizona was killed on Escudilla Mountain just east of Big lake.

=== Aquatic Species ===
The region is home to many species of fish, both native and nonnative, including Rainbow trout, Brown trout, Brook trout, Tiger trout, Cutthroat trout, Apache trout, Sonora sucker, Desert sucker, Little Colorado River sucker, Little Colorado spinedace, Roundtail chub, Speckled dace, and Loach minnow.

A few species of Crustaceans and Mollusks that can be found here are Northern crawfish, California floater mussel, and Three forks springsnail.

=== Birds ===
Many bird species are abundant in the region, including Merriam's turkey, Dusky grouse, Gambel's quail, Scaled quail, Montezuma quail, Mourning dove, White-winged dove, and Band-tailed pigeon.

Waterfowl that can be found in and around the region's bodies of water include Great blue heron, Black-crowned night heron, Snowy egret, white-faced ibis, Killdeer plover, Canada goose, Mallard, Redhead, Bufflehead, Cinnamon teal, Green-winged teal, Gadwall, Northern pintail, American wigeon, Northern shoveler, Lesser scaup, Common goldeneye, pied-billed grebe, and eared grebe.

Species of Raptors and Corvids that live in the area include Bald eagle, Golden eagle, Osprey, Red-tailed hawk, Northern goshawk, Coppers hawk, Sharp-shinned hawk, Common black hawk, Swainson's hawk, Rough-legged hawk, Zone-tailed hawk, Northern harrier, Peregrine falcon, Prairie falcon, Merlin, American kestrel, Great horned owl, Long-eared owl, Short-eared owl, Barn owl, Western screech owl, Mexican spotted owl, Northern pygmy owl, Flammulated owl, Northern saw-whet owl, Burrowing owl, Turkey vulture, Common raven, Canada jay, and American crow.

=== Mammals ===
The White Mountains, including around Greer, are home to an array of species of mammals:

Hoofed mammals include elk, mule deer, white-tailed deer, javelina, bighorn sheep, pronghorn, bison, feral horses, and cattle.

Predatory mammals in the region include black bear, mountain lion, bobcat, Mexican grey wolf, coyote, gray fox, striped skunk, western spotted skunk, ringtail cat, raccoon, coatimundi, river otter, American badger, black-footed ferret, and long-tailed weasel

Many species of rodents call the area home, including Beaver, Muskrat, Porcupine, Arizona gray squirrel, Red squirrel, Rock squirrel, Abert's squirrel, Gunnison's prairie dog, Botta's pocket gopher, Golden-mantled ground squirrel, Thirteen-lined ground squirrel, Cliff chipmunk, Least chipmunk, Grey-collared chipmunk, White-throated woodrat, Mexican woodrat, Deer mouse, Pinyon mouse, House mouse, Western harvest mouse, Western jumping mouse, Northern grasshopper mouse, White-footed mouse, Southern red-backed vole, Montane vole, Mexican vole, Montane shrew, and Merriam's shrew

Leporids in this region include the Mountain cottontail rabbit, Eastern cottontail rabbit, and Black-tailed jackrabbit.

Bats found here include the Big brown bat, Little brown bat, Canyon bat, Hoary bat, Pallid bat, Spotted bat, Allen's big-eared bat, Silver-haired bat, Townsend's big-eared bat, Western mastiff bat, Mexican free-tailed bat, Big free-tailed bat, Western small-footed bat, Long-legged bat, Yuma myotis, Arizona myotis, Cave myotis, California myotis, Southwestern myotis, Long-eared myotis, and Fringed myotis.

=== Reptiles and Amphibians ===
Despite the region's high elevation and cooler climate, many species of reptiles and amphibians can be found here:

Snakes include Arizona black rattlesnake, Prairie rattlesnake, Black-tailed rattlesnake, Sonoran mountain kingsnake, Chihuahuan nightsnake, Sonoran gophersnake, Terrestrial gartersnake, and Narrow-headed gartersnake.

Lizards in the area include Eastern collared lizard, Greater short-horned lizard, Southwestern fence lizard, Plateau fence lizard, Ornate tree lizard, Many-lined skink, and Plateau stripped whiptail.

The only species of turtle living in the area is the Western painted turtle.

Amphibians that can be found in and near the lakes, rivers, and other bodies of water in the region include Canyon tree frog, Arizona tree frog, Western chorus frog, Chiricahua leopard frog, Northern leopard frog, Arizona toad, Mexican spadefoot, and Barred tiger salamander.

== Demographics ==
Greer is home to few resident individuals or families with a year-round population of just 58 as of the 2020 census. In summer, the population jumps to around 1,000 people. Many of the homes in the area are cabins or summer getaways for Phoenix and Tucson locals, due to the cooler temperatures. The ZIP code for Greer is 85927 and the area code is 928.

Historical population
Census	Pop.	Note	%±
2010	41		—
2020	58		41.5%
U.S. Decennial Census

Greer is 0.53 square miles. The median age is 61.5 years and the median household income is $76,114. There are 236 households in the area and 770 housing units which 30.6% are occupied. The median price of an owner occupied housing unit is $584,700. 90% of the people are married.

== Attractions/Recreation ==
- Apache-Sitgreaves National Forest, 2.76 million acres of national forest
- Sunrise Ski Resort, Arizona's largest ski resort
- The Molly Butler Lodge, Restaurant and Bar, circa 1910
- Rendezvous Diner, A small Vintage Diner.
- Hon-Dah Casino, A casino on the Fort Apache Indian Reservation west of Greer
- The Little Colorado River, medium-sized cold water stream through the center of town
- The Black River, large river part of the Salt River watershed offering camping and fishing
- Greer Lakes (River Reservoir, Bunch Reservoir, Tunnel Reservoir), offers cold water fishing and recreation
- White Mountain Lakes (Big Lake, Reservation Lake, Sunrise Lake, Lee Valley lake, Crescent lake) Large lakes offering trophy trout fishing, boating, and camping
- Mount Baldy, Second highest mountain in Arizona
- Escudilla Mountain, Third highest mountain in Arizona

== Government and infrastructure ==
- The United States Postal Service operates the Greer Post Office.
- The Apache County Library District operates the Greer Memorial Library.
- Historic Greer schoolhouse
- Greer fire district station #1

== Notable people ==
- Adam Driggs, Arizona judge, lawyer, and former Senator
- James Willard Schultz, American author, explorer, fur trader and historian of the Blackfeet Indians
