= Tunnel Reservoir =

Waterbody in Apache County, Arizona

- Location within Arizona
- Location: Apache County, Arizona
- Coordinates: 34°1′50.98″N 109°26′33.46″W
- Type: Reservoir
- Basin countries: United States
- Surface area: 15 acres (6.1 ha)
- Average depth: 10 ft (3.0 m)
- Surface elevation: 8,260 ft (2,520 m)

Tunnel Reservoir is an artificial lake and recreational area, located in the White Mountains around the town of Greer, Arizona. This reservoir is one of three lakes known as the Greer Lakes. The Greer Lakes include Bunch, Tunnel and River Reservoirs, and are a short distance apart from each other. The boating facility offers a boat-launching area, boat-trailer parking, restrooms, and space for recreational vehicles. The reservoir is stocked with both Rainbow and Brown trout species.
