= Bunch Reservoir =

Lakes on the Little Colorado River in Apache County, Arizona

- Location within Arizona
- Location: Apache County, Arizona
- Coordinates: 34°2′20.42″N 109°26′47.35″W
- Basin countries: United States
- Surface area: 20 acres (81,000 m^{2})
- Average depth: 10 ft (3.0 m)
- Surface elevation: 8,260 ft (2,520 m)

Bunch Reservoir is one of a trio of lakes on the Little Colorado River that provides trout fishing opportunities in and around the town of Greer.

== Location ==
Bunch Reservoir is located at 8,260 feet (2,520 m) on the Apache-Sitgreaves National Forests. The Greer Lakes, as they are collectively known, include Bunch, Tunnel and River Reservoirs, and are a short distance apart from each other.

== Description ==
Bunch is 20 acres (81,000 m^{2}) in size, and has an average depth of 10 feet (3.0 m). The Department stocks the lake with catchable-sized rainbow trout in the spring and summer. Like its two neighboring reservoirs, Bunch gets a few brown trout from the Little Colorado River diversion that refills it in the winter, but browns are not stocked here.

== History ==
Bunch Reservoir was constructed in part by Elias Conway "E.C." Bunch

== Fish species ==
- Rainbow trout
- Brown trout

== Sources ==
- Arizona Fishin' Holes, Phoenix, AZ: Arizona Game and Fish Department, 2007
