= Sunrise Park Resort =

Ski resort near Greer, Arizona

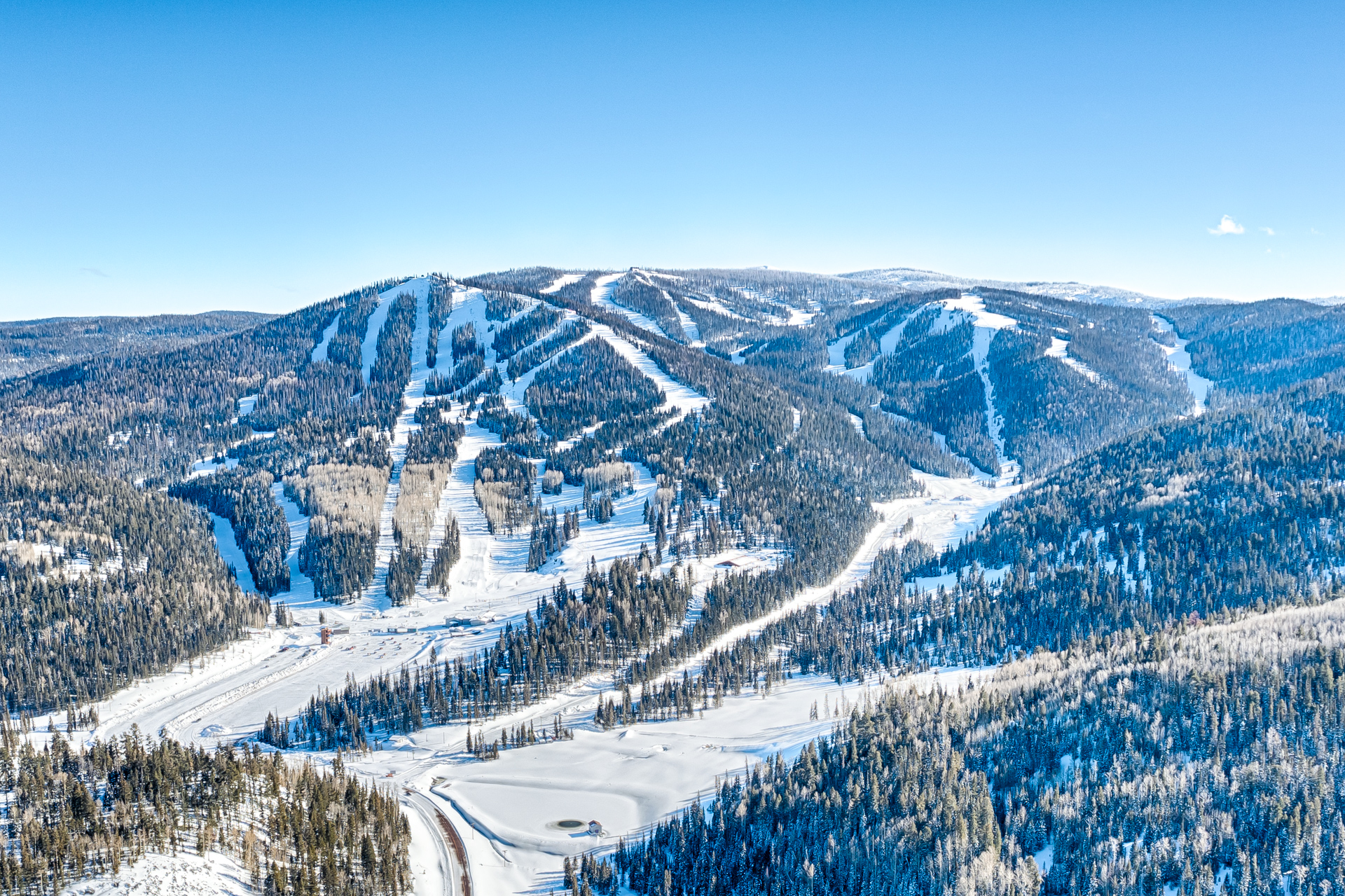
- The three mountains at Sunrise Park Resort: Sunrise Peak, Apache Peak, and Cyclone Circle

- Location in Arizona Sunrise Park Resort (the United States)
- Location: Apache County, Arizona, United States
- Nearest city: Greer, Arizona
- Coordinates: 33°58′24″N 109°33′53″W
- Vertical: 1,900 ft (580 m)
- Top elevation: 11,100 feet (3,400 m)
- Base elevation: 9,200 feet (2,800 m)
- Skiable area: 1,200 acres (4.9 km^{2})
- Trails: 67 total 46% beginner 28% intermediate 25% advanced/expert
- Longest run: 2.75 m (9 ft 0 in)
- Lift system: 8 Operational Chairlifts: 1 High-Speed Quad; 2 Fixed Quad; 2 Fixed Triple; 1 Fixed Double; 2 Surface lift
- Lift capacity: 16,000 / hr
- Terrain parks: 1
- Snowfall: 250 in/year ( 6.35 m/year)
- Snowmaking: Yes
- Night skiing: Yes (4:30 p.m. - 8:00 p.m. on limited days)
- Website: www.sunrise.ski

Sunrise Park Resort is an alpine ski resort located near Greer, Arizona. The resort consists of three mountains named Sunrise Peak, Cyclone Circle, and Apache Peak. Situated on the Colorado Plateau and perched atop the White Mountains in eastern Arizona. The base of the resort sits at 9,200 feet (2,800 m) and the tallest mountain, Apache Peak, tops out at an elevation of 11,100 feet (3,400 m) above sea level. The ski slopes spread across the 3 peaks and cover 1,200 acres (4.9 km^{2}), making it the largest ski resort in Arizona.

Sunrise Park Resort is owned and operated by the White Mountain Apache Tribe and located on the Fort Apache Indian Reservation. The resort is a year-round recreation destination and offers a wide range of outdoor activities.

== Climate ==
According to the Köppen Climate Classification system, Sunrise Park Resort has a warm-summer mediterranean continental climate, abbreviated "Dsb" on climate maps. The hottest temperature recorded at Sunrise Park Resort was 86 °F (30.0 °C) on June 27, 2002 and June 20, 2016, while the coldest temperature recorded was −26 °F (−32.2 °C) on January 4, 1972.

Climate data for Sunrise Park Resort, Arizona, 1991–2020 normals, extremes 1971–present
Month	Jan	Feb	Mar	Apr	May	Jun	Jul	Aug	Sep	Oct	Nov	Dec	Year
Record high °F (°C)	62 (17)	62 (17)	65 (18)	70 (21)	75 (24)	86 (30)	85 (29)	83 (28)	82 (28)	75 (24)	67 (19)	64 (18)	86 (30)
Mean maximum °F (°C)	53.5 (11.9)	53.4 (11.9)	57.6 (14.2)	62.9 (17.2)	69.4 (20.8)	79.4 (26.3)	78.1 (25.6)	76.1 (24.5)	73.4 (23.0)	68.6 (20.3)	60.3 (15.7)	55.3 (12.9)	81.7 (27.6)
Mean daily maximum °F (°C)	42.1 (5.6)	41.8 (5.4)	46.0 (7.8)	53.0 (11.7)	61.8 (16.6)	71.2 (21.8)	71.4 (21.9)	69.8 (21.0)	67.4 (19.7)	59.8 (15.4)	51.2 (10.7)	42.2 (5.7)	56.5 (13.6)
Daily mean °F (°C)	26.7 (−2.9)	28.4 (−2.0)	33.3 (0.7)	39.2 (4.0)	46.5 (8.1)	54.1 (12.3)	57.7 (14.3)	56.2 (13.4)	52.4 (11.3)	43.3 (6.3)	35.9 (2.2)	28.2 (−2.1)	41.8 (5.5)
Mean daily minimum °F (°C)	11.2 (−11.6)	14.9 (−9.5)	20.6 (−6.3)	25.4 (−3.7)	31.1 (−0.5)	37.0 (2.8)	44.0 (6.7)	42.6 (5.9)	37.4 (3.0)	26.8 (−2.9)	20.6 (−6.3)	14.1 (−9.9)	27.1 (−2.7)
Mean minimum °F (°C)	−9.2 (−22.9)	−5.7 (−20.9)	2.3 (−16.5)	9.1 (−12.7)	16.6 (−8.6)	25.3 (−3.7)	35.1 (1.7)	34.2 (1.2)	25.5 (−3.6)	17.0 (−8.3)	4.5 (−15.3)	−7.5 (−21.9)	−13.0 (−25.0)
Record low °F (°C)	−26 (−32)	−20 (−29)	−16 (−27)	−9 (−23)	0 (−18)	14 (−10)	20 (−7)	21 (−6)	12 (−11)	−5 (−21)	−16 (−27)	−20 (−29)	−26 (−32)
Average precipitation inches (mm)	2.02 (51)	2.76 (70)	2.30 (58)	0.95 (24)	0.73 (19)	0.87 (22)	4.65 (118)	3.96 (101)	2.33 (59)	1.59 (40)	1.67 (42)	2.85 (72)	26.68 (676)
Average snowfall inches (cm)	25.8 (66)	35.8 (91)	22.0 (56)	2.3 (5.8)	1.3 (3.3)	0.0 (0.0)	0.0 (0.0)	0.0 (0.0)	0.0 (0.0)	3.1 (7.9)	6.7 (17)	31.8 (81)	128.8 (328)
Average extreme snow depth inches (cm)	18.1 (46)	32.9 (84)	25.3 (64)	11.2 (28)	0.6 (1.5)	0.0 (0.0)	0.0 (0.0)	0.0 (0.0)	0.0 (0.0)	1.0 (2.5)	4.4 (11)	14.8 (38)	28.8 (73)
Average precipitation days (≥ 0.01 in)	4.9	6.4	5.2	1.4	1.9	3.4	12.7	11.7	7.7	3.8	3.1	7.2	69.4
Average snowy days (≥ 0.1 in)	5.2	6.7	5.3	0.8	0.3	0.0	0.0	0.0	0.0	1.1	2.2	6.1	27.7
Source 1: NOAA
Source 2: National Weather Service

== Winter ==
The ski season at Sunrise Park Resort usually runs from Thanksgiving through the end of March. During the winter, the resort's three mountains offer alpine skiing. Night skiing is offered around Christmas and on holiday weekends in January and February. There is also a snowboard terrain park, separate cross-country skiing area, ski biking, and a snow tubing hill.

== Mountain statistics ==
=== Elevation ===
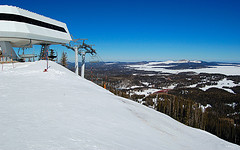
View of the Sunrise High-Speed lift at the top of Sunrise Peak

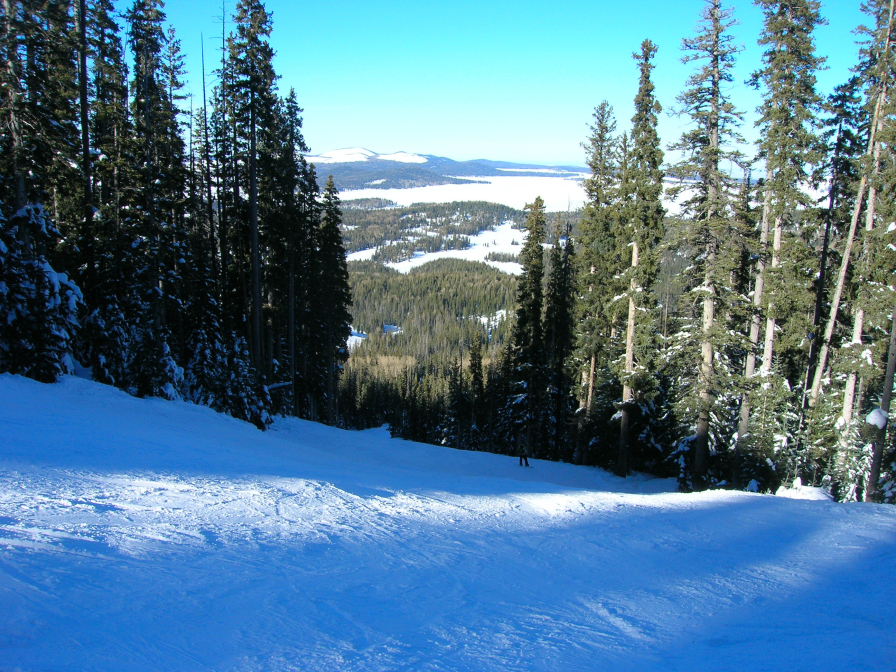
View from mid-mountain Sunrise Peak looking north. Volcanic cinder cones can be seen in the distance.

The ski area consists of three peaks:

- Sunrise Peak (elevation 10,700')
- Apache Peak (elevation 11,000')
  - Base: 9,200 feet (2,800 m)
  - Summit: 11,000 feet (3,400 m)
  - Vertical drop: 1,800 feet (2nd highest in Arizona)
- Cyclone Circle (elevation 10,700')

=== Trails ===
Sunrise has 67 trails covering a skiable area of 1,200 acres (4.9 km^{2}). The trails on the mountain have some sort of theme, such as Native American and Western names.

- Beginner – 31 trails (46%)
- Intermediate – 19 trails (28%)
- Advanced/Expert – 14 trails (21%)
- Advanced/Expert – 3 trails (4%)

=== Lifts ===
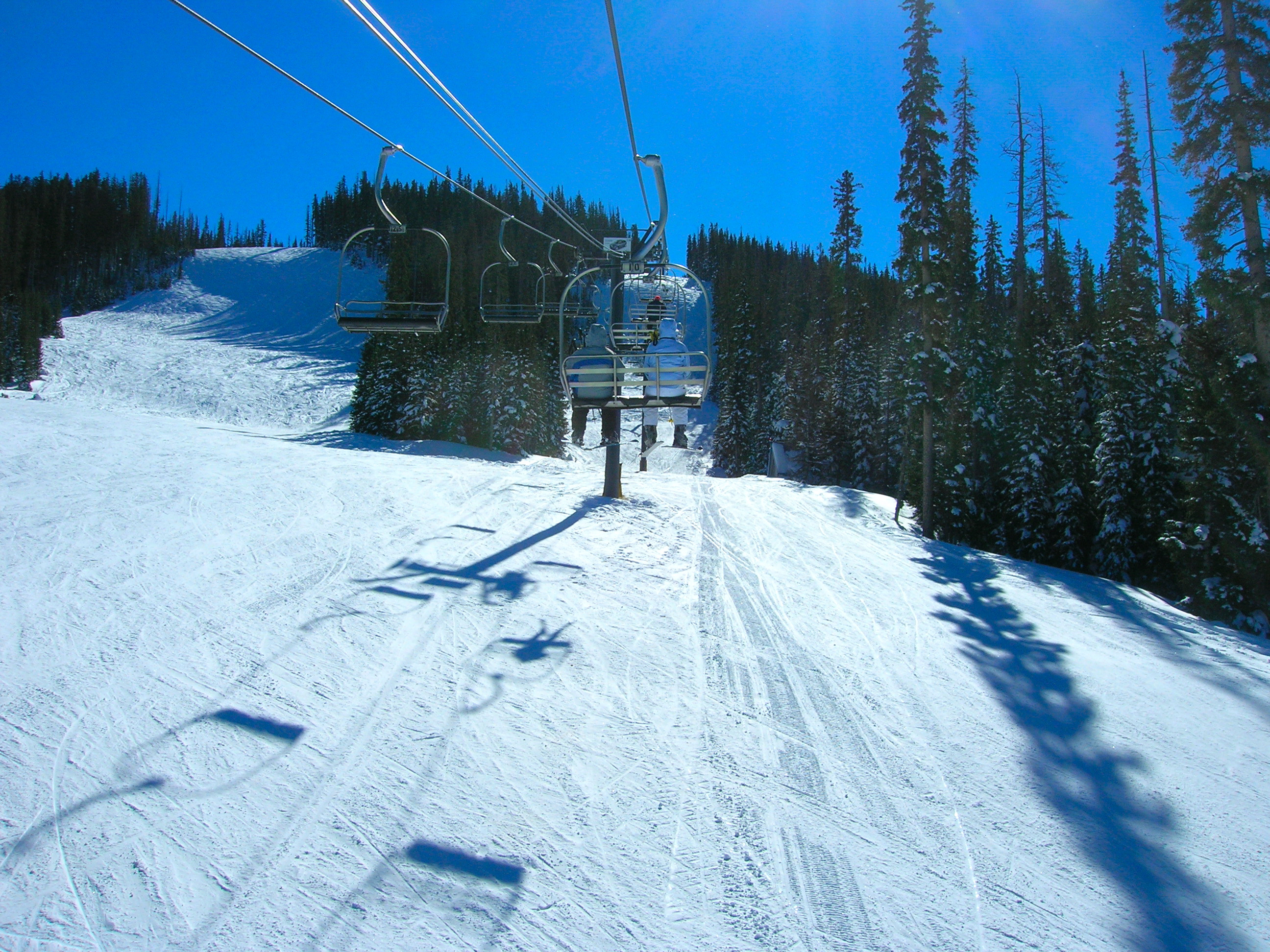
Triple chairlift on Apache Peak.

Lift name	Capacity	Length (feet)	Vertical (feet)
Sunrise High-Speed	High-speed quad	6800	1400
Pony	Fixed double	295	50
Rustler	Fixed quad	3950	875
Fort Apache	Fixed triple	5180	620
Geronimo	Fixed triple	4505	1000
Spirit Ridge	Fixed quad	3900	550
Beginner Surface Lift	Single surface lift	300	42
Cyclone Cord	Swiss Cord surface lift	650	50

- 8 Total operational lifts
  - 1 High-speed quad chairs
  - 2 Fixed quad chairs
  - 2 Fixed triple chairs
  - 1 Fixed double chairs
  - 2 Surface lifts
- Uphill Capacity – 16,000 skiers per hour

== Summer ==
The summer season at Sunrise Park Resort usually runs from Memorial Day weekend through September or October, depending on weather and other factors. Sunrise offers several summer activities, including downhill mountain biking, scenic chairlift rides, a zip line course, a tubing hill, a rock climbing wall, hiking, and 3D archery.

=== Mountain bike trails ===
There are 22 mountain bike trails, and an array of side trails. The trail system is primarily located on Sunrise Peak, with one trail (Ba'cho) traveling over to Apache Peak and Cyclone Circle. All trails converge at the base of Sunrise Peak, where riders can load on the Sunrise Express (Lift 1, high-speed quad) or the Spirit Ridge (Lift 8, fixed grip quad lift) to access the trails.

- Easy – 6 trails (27%)
- Intermediate – 3 trails (14%)
- Difficult – 8 trails (36%)
- Expert – 5 trails (23%)

== See also ==
- Arizona Snowbowl
- Mount Lemmon Ski Valley
- List of mountains and hills of Arizona by height
