= Crescent Lake (Arizona) =

Lake in the Apache–Sitgreaves National Forests

- Location within Arizona Location within the United States
- Location: Apache County, Arizona
- Coordinates: 33°54′32″N 109°25′10″W
- Basin countries: United States
- Surface area: 100 acres (40 ha)
- Average depth: 15 ft (4.6 m)
- Surface elevation: 9,040 ft (2,760 m)

Crescent Lake is located approximately 2 miles (3.2 km) north of Big Lake. The lake sits at just over 9,000 feet (2,700 m) elevation on the Apache-Sitgreaves National Forests, as such the facilities located here are managed by that authority. Access is restricted in the winter when roads are closed due to snow, generally December to early April.

== Description ==
Crescent Lake has 100 acres (40 ha), with an average depth of 10 feet (3.0 m). It's a highly productive lake, which allows trout to gain size quickly. However, the lake is shallow, which encourages weed growth and algae blooms, and makes it subject to late summer and winter fish kills. To manage the problem of winter kills, the Arizona Game and Fish stocks the lake with large numbers of catchable rainbow trout and brook trout each spring.

== Fish species ==
- Rainbow trout
- Brook trout

== Climate ==
Maverick Fork is a SNOTEL weather station near Crescent Lake. Maverick Fork has a dry-summer subalpine climate (Köppen Dsc), bordering on a dry-summer humid continental climate (Köppen Dsb).

Climate data for Maverick Fork, Arizona, 1991–2020 normals, 1988-2020 extremes: 9200ft (2804m)
Month	Jan	Feb	Mar	Apr	May	Jun	Jul	Aug	Sep	Oct	Nov	Dec	Year
Record high °F (°C)	59 (15)	60 (16)	66 (19)	75 (24)	83 (28)	86 (30)	89 (32)	82 (28)	79 (26)	73 (23)	66 (19)	62 (17)	89 (32)
Mean maximum °F (°C)	54.5 (12.5)	55.4 (13.0)	60.3 (15.7)	64.8 (18.2)	72.6 (22.6)	80.1 (26.7)	80.4 (26.9)	76.0 (24.4)	72.8 (22.7)	67.9 (19.9)	61.1 (16.2)	55.4 (13.0)	81.9 (27.7)
Mean daily maximum °F (°C)	42.0 (5.6)	43.4 (6.3)	48.2 (9.0)	53.4 (11.9)	61.5 (16.4)	71.4 (21.9)	71.9 (22.2)	69.5 (20.8)	65.5 (18.6)	57.4 (14.1)	48.7 (9.3)	41.4 (5.2)	56.2 (13.4)
Daily mean °F (°C)	28.8 (−1.8)	30.3 (−0.9)	34.7 (1.5)	39.7 (4.3)	47.3 (8.5)	56.1 (13.4)	59.1 (15.1)	57.4 (14.1)	52.7 (11.5)	44.3 (6.8)	36.1 (2.3)	28.9 (−1.7)	42.9 (6.1)
Mean daily minimum °F (°C)	15.7 (−9.1)	17.2 (−8.2)	21.2 (−6.0)	26.1 (−3.3)	32.9 (0.5)	40.7 (4.8)	46.2 (7.9)	45.4 (7.4)	39.9 (4.4)	31.1 (−0.5)	23.4 (−4.8)	16.3 (−8.7)	29.7 (−1.3)
Mean minimum °F (°C)	−0.8 (−18.2)	1.2 (−17.1)	6.1 (−14.4)	13.0 (−10.6)	21.8 (−5.7)	30.9 (−0.6)	40.1 (4.5)	39.9 (4.4)	30.9 (−0.6)	17.7 (−7.9)	7.3 (−13.7)	−2.5 (−19.2)	−5.8 (−21.0)
Record low °F (°C)	−17 (−27)	−19 (−28)	−7 (−22)	4 (−16)	16 (−9)	18 (−8)	29 (−2)	28 (−2)	21 (−6)	6 (−14)	−6 (−21)	−21 (−29)	−21 (−29)
Average precipitation inches (mm)	2.78 (71)	2.53 (64)	2.02 (51)	1.11 (28)	0.77 (20)	0.52 (13)	3.79 (96)	4.04 (103)	2.12 (54)	1.92 (49)	2.17 (55)	2.76 (70)	26.53 (674)
Average extreme snow depth inches (cm)	29.1 (74)	31.7 (81)	29.6 (75)	9.6 (24)	1.6 (4.1)	0.3 (0.76)	0.1 (0.25)	0.2 (0.51)	0.2 (0.51)	1.6 (4.1)	5.9 (15)	17.9 (45)	35.9 (91)
Source 1: XMACIS2
Source 2: NOAA (Precipitation)
