= Escudilla Mountain =

Landform in Apache County, Arizona

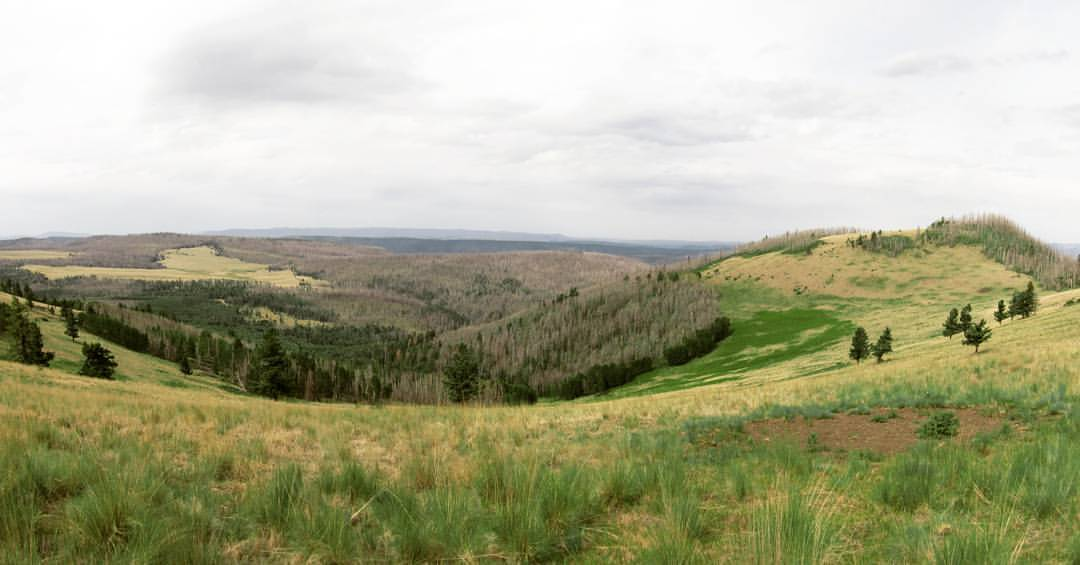
- Profanity Ridge on Escudilla Mt, Apache-Sitgreaves NF, AZ

Highest point
- Elevation: 10,916 ft (3,327 m) NAVD 88
- Prominence: 2,372 ft (723 m)
- Coordinates: 33°57′19″N 109°07′31″W

Naming
- English translation: Large cup
- Language of name: Spanish
- Pronunciation: /ɛskuːˈdiːə/

Geography
- Location within Arizona Location within the United States
- Location: Apache County, Arizona, U.S.
- Parent range: White Mountains
- Topo map: USGS Escudilla

Geology
- Mountain type: Volcanic

Climbing
- Easiest route: Trail hike

Escudilla Mountain is located in Apache County, Arizona, United States, and is part of the White Mountains. The peak is approximately 3.5 miles from the Arizona-New Mexico border. The summit is the highest point in the Escudilla Wilderness which is administered as part of the Apache-Sitgreaves National Forest. It is also the third-highest mountain peak in Arizona.

The area was severely impacted by the Wallow Fire of June 2011.

A portion of Aldo Leopold's Sand County Almanac discusses Escudilla and that it was the location of the last grizzly bear killed in Arizona (in 1936).

== Climate ==
Climate data for Escudilla Mountain 33.9601 N, 109.1169 W, Elevation: 10,676 ft (3,254 m) (1991–2020 normals)
Month	Jan	Feb	Mar	Apr	May	Jun	Jul	Aug	Sep	Oct	Nov	Dec	Year
Mean daily maximum °F (°C)	38.3 (3.5)	38.5 (3.6)	42.8 (6.0)	49.0 (9.4)	57.2 (14.0)	68.0 (20.0)	68.9 (20.5)	66.5 (19.2)	62.4 (16.9)	54.8 (12.7)	45.5 (7.5)	38.6 (3.7)	52.5 (11.4)
Daily mean °F (°C)	26.4 (−3.1)	26.3 (−3.2)	30.0 (−1.1)	35.2 (1.8)	43.3 (6.3)	53.1 (11.7)	55.8 (13.2)	54.2 (12.3)	49.6 (9.8)	41.4 (5.2)	33.4 (0.8)	26.9 (−2.8)	39.6 (4.2)
Mean daily minimum °F (°C)	14.5 (−9.7)	14.0 (−10.0)	17.3 (−8.2)	21.3 (−5.9)	29.3 (−1.5)	38.3 (3.5)	42.7 (5.9)	41.9 (5.5)	36.8 (2.7)	28.1 (−2.2)	21.3 (−5.9)	15.3 (−9.3)	26.7 (−2.9)
Average precipitation inches (mm)	2.15 (55)	1.70 (43)	1.78 (45)	0.80 (20)	0.73 (19)	0.83 (21)	4.58 (116)	4.43 (113)	2.82 (72)	1.95 (50)	1.48 (38)	1.88 (48)	25.13 (640)
Source: PRISM Climate Group
