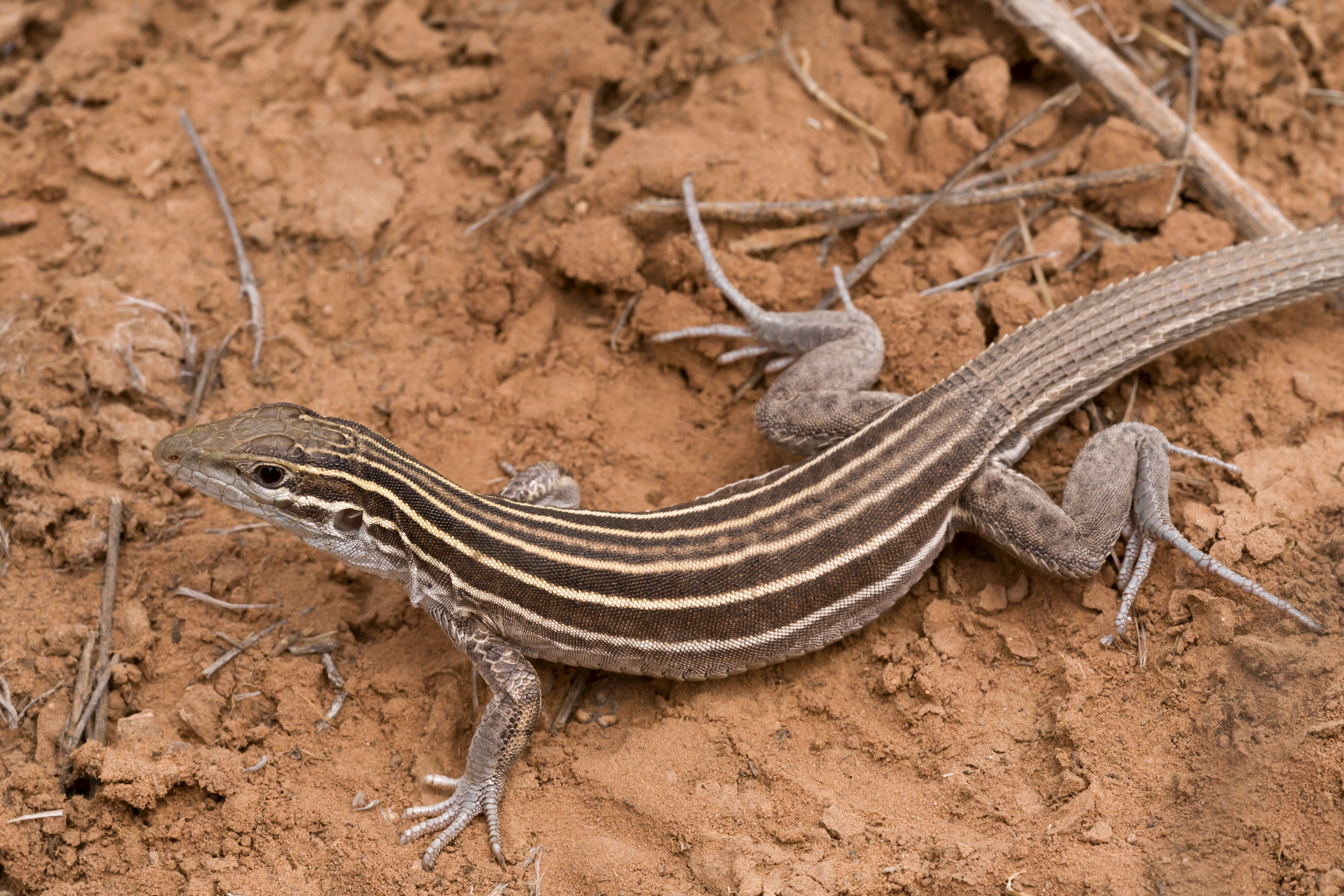

Conservation status
- Least Concern (IUCN 3.1)

Scientific classification
- Kingdom: Animalia
- Phylum: Chordata
- Class: Reptilia
- Order: Squamata
- Suborder: Lacertoidea
- Family: Teiidae
- Genus: Aspidoscelis
- Species: A. velox

Binomial name
- Aspidoscelis velox (Springer, 1928)

= Plateau striped whiptail =

Species of lizard

The plateau striped whiptail (Aspidoscelis velox) is a species of teiid lizard found in Utah, Colorado, Arizona, and New Mexico in the United States. It was introduced to Cove Palisades State Park the state of Oregon as early as the 1960s; it has since persisted, with its range expanding locally to the surrounding areas.
