= Maverick, Arizona =

- Populated place
- Location within the state of Arizona Maverick (the United States)
- Coordinates: 33°44′34″N 109°32′50″W
- Country: United States
- State: Arizona
- County: Apache
- Elevation: 7,805 ft (2,379 m)
- Time zone: UTC-7 (Mountain (MST))
  - Summer (DST): UTC-7 (MST)
- Area code: 928
- FIPS code: 04-45110
- GNIS feature ID: 24510

Maverick is a populated place situated in Apache County, Arizona, United States. It has an estimated elevation of 7,805 feet (2,379 m) above sea level.

A former logging camp, Maverick was the former southern end of the Apache Railway.

== Climate ==
Maverick has a borderline subarctic and warm-summer Mediterranean climate because while the overnight lows can be very cold, averaging in the single digits in winter months, the daytime temperatures are much warmer.

Climate data for Maverick, Arizona, 1991–2020 normals, extremes 1901–present
Month	Jan	Feb	Mar	Apr	May	Jun	Jul	Aug	Sep	Oct	Nov	Dec	Year
Record high °F (°C)	70 (21)	72 (22)	76 (24)	80 (27)	86 (30)	95 (35)	92 (33)	91 (33)	90 (32)	84 (29)	73 (23)	69 (21)	95 (35)
Mean maximum °F (°C)	60 (16)	61 (16)	65 (18)	71 (22)	79 (26)	86 (30)	88 (31)	83 (28)	81 (27)	76 (24)	68 (20)	62 (17)	89 (32)
Mean daily maximum °F (°C)	45.8 (7.7)	47.5 (8.6)	50.5 (10.3)	59.1 (15.1)	67.2 (19.6)	76.3 (24.6)	77.1 (25.1)	75.0 (23.9)	72.9 (22.7)	65.0 (18.3)	55.1 (12.8)	48.5 (9.2)	61.7 (16.5)
Daily mean °F (°C)	26.2 (−3.2)	28.1 (−2.2)	32.3 (0.2)	39.5 (4.2)	45.8 (7.7)	54.2 (12.3)	60.1 (15.6)	58.7 (14.8)	53.8 (12.1)	45.1 (7.3)	35.4 (1.9)	28.9 (−1.7)	42.3 (5.8)
Mean daily minimum °F (°C)	6.7 (−14.1)	8.2 (−13.2)	14.2 (−9.9)	19.9 (−6.7)	24.5 (−4.2)	32.1 (0.1)	43.0 (6.1)	42.2 (5.7)	34.6 (1.4)	25.1 (−3.8)	15.8 (−9.0)	9.4 (−12.6)	23.0 (−5.0)
Mean minimum °F (°C)	−17 (−27)	−14 (−26)	−6 (−21)	7 (−14)	15 (−9)	22 (−6)	35 (2)	34 (1)	25 (−4)	15 (−9)	−1 (−18)	−11 (−24)	−22 (−30)
Record low °F (°C)	−40 (−40)	−33 (−36)	−27 (−33)	−9 (−23)	4 (−16)	12 (−11)	23 (−5)	25 (−4)	16 (−9)	3 (−16)	−15 (−26)	−30 (−34)	−40 (−40)
Average precipitation inches (mm)	2.89 (73)	1.84 (47)	2.34 (59)	1.15 (29)	0.43 (11)	0.98 (25)	4.92 (125)	4.93 (125)	2.17 (55)	2.04 (52)	1.47 (37)	2.70 (69)	27.86 (707)
Average snowfall inches (cm)	24.8 (63)	17.9 (45)	17.4 (44)	6.3 (16)	1.1 (2.8)	0.0 (0.0)	0.0 (0.0)	0.0 (0.0)	0.0 (0.0)	1.8 (4.6)	7.4 (19)	21.2 (54)	97.9 (248.4)
Source: WRCC
