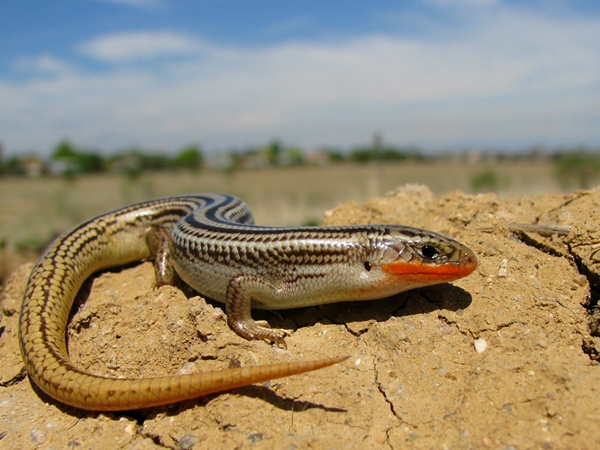

Conservation status
- Least Concern (IUCN 3.1)

Scientific classification
- Kingdom: Animalia
- Phylum: Chordata
- Class: Reptilia
- Order: Squamata
- Family: Scincidae
- Genus: Plestiodon
- Species: P. multivirgatus

Binomial name
- Plestiodon multivirgatus Hallowell, 1857
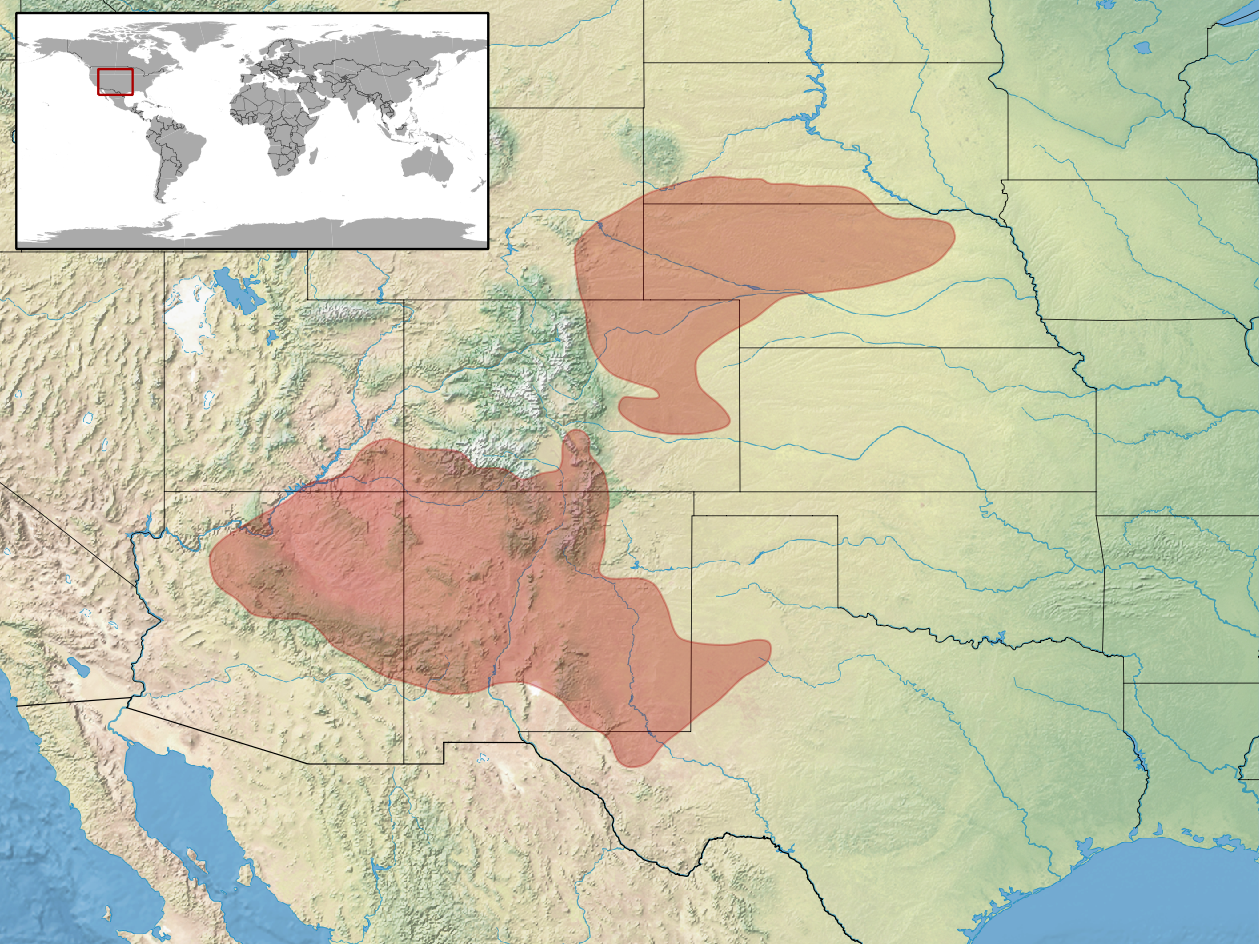

Synonyms
- Plestiodon multivirgatum Hallowell, 1857; Eumeces multivirgatus — Cope, 1875; Eumeces gaigeae Taylor, 1935; Eumeces multivirgatus gaigeae — Lowe, 1955; Eumeces multivirgatus — Stebbins, 1985; Plestiodon multivirgatus — Schmitz et al., 2004

= Plestiodon multivirgatus =

Species of lizard

Plestiodon multivirgatus, commonly known as the many-lined skink, the northern many-lined skink, or the variable skink, is a medium-sized species of lizard, a member of the North American skink genus Plestiodon in the family Scincidae. The species is native to the western United States.

== Taxonomy ==
The taxonomy of this species is somewhat unclear, even amongst researchers. Most commonly, two subspecies are recognized:

- P. m. multivirgatus (Hallowell, 1857) – northern many-lined skink
- P. m. epipleurotus (Cope, 1880) – variable skink

The latter is sometimes treated as a separate species Plestiodon epipleurotus or Plestiodon gaigeae (Taylor, 1935), or given as the subspecies P. m. gaigeae. These last two scientific names are in honor of American herpetologist Helen Beulah Thompson Gaige (1890–1976) of the University of Michigan.

P. m. epipleurotus is also called the two-lined skink.

== Description ==
The many-lined skink is a medium-sized skink reaching a maximum snout-to-vent length (SVL) of about 7.5 cm (3.0 in) and a total length of roughly 19 cm (7.5 in). Its body is olive to brown in color. P. m. multivirgatus has black stripes along the body and tail, while P. m. epipleurotus has two white stripes with black borders.

== Geographic range & habitat ==
The geographic range of P. m. multivirgatus in the north includes southern South Dakota, Nebraska, and Wyoming, and extends in the south to the Arkansas River in Colorado. P. m. multivirgatus prefers sandy soil and occurs in habitat below 1,675 m (5,495 ft).

P. m. epipleurotus occurs from south-eastern Utah and southern Colorado through Arizona, New Mexico, and western Texas. It lives in rocky habitat up to elevations of 2,600 m (8,500 ft).

== Reproduction ==
P. multivirgatus is oviparous. Eggs are deposited under rocks.
