= Lee Valley Lake =

Lake in Apache County, Arizona, US

- Location within Arizona
- Location: Apache County, Arizona
- Coordinates: 33°56′28.40″N 109°30′3.24″W
- Type: Reservoir
- Basin countries: United States
- Surface area: 35 acres (14 ha)
- Average depth: 10 ft (3.0 m)
- Max. depth: 20 ft (6.1 m)
- Surface elevation: 9,420 ft (2,870 m)

Lee Valley Lake is Arizona's highest elevation reservoir, situated at 9,420 feet (2,870 m) in the Apache-Sitgreaves National Forests near Mount Baldy. It is located approximately 35 miles from Pinetop-Lakeside, connected by Arizona highways 260 and 273 and forest road 113. Access is restricted in the winter when roads are closed due to snow, generally December to early April.

== Description ==
Lee Valley Lake has 35 acres (14 ha) with a maximum depth of 20 feet (6.1 m) and an average depth of 10 feet (3.0 m). It is located on Lee Valley Creek, an Apache trout recovery stream. The Apache trout is the Arizona state fish. The creek naturally flows into the East Fork of the Little Colorado River; however, the spillway directs overflow to the West Fork of the Little Colorado River. Both streams are also designated for Apache trout recovery, thus Lee Valley Lake finds itself at the heart of three Apache trout recovery streams and is managed accordingly.

== Fish species ==
- Apache trout (threatened)
- Arctic grayling (introduced)
