= White Mountains (Arizona) =

Mountain range in eastern Arizona

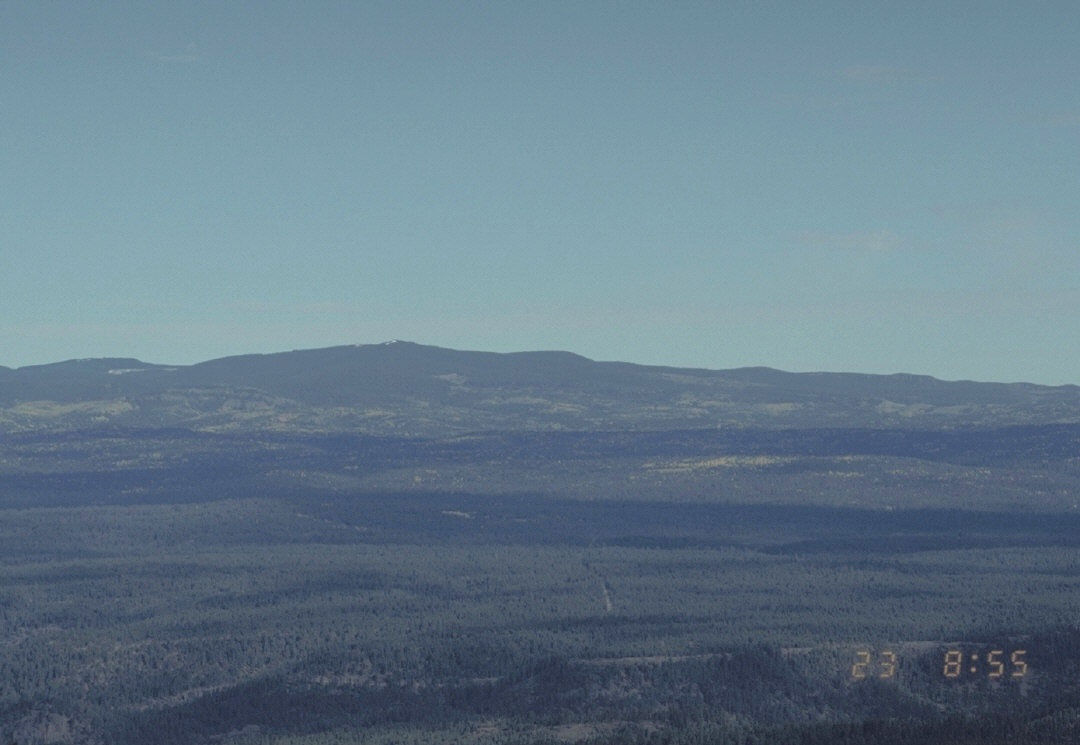
- Mount Baldy

Highest point
- Elevation: Mount Baldy; 11,420 ft (3,480 m); 33°54′22″N 109°33′46″W

Geography
- Location within Arizona

- Position of White Mountains inside Arizona
- Parent range: Arizona transition zone–Colorado Plateau

The White Mountains of Arizona are a mountain range and mountainous region in the eastern part of the state, near the border with New Mexico; they are a continuation from the west of the Arizona transition zone–Mogollon Rim, with the Rim ending in western New Mexico. The White Mountains are a part of the Colorado Plateau high country of Northeast Arizona, the Navajo Nation, with the rest of the Plateau in eastern Utah, northwest New Mexico, and southwestern Colorado. Nearby communities include Show Low, Pinetop-Lakeside, Greer, St. Johns, Springerville, Eagar, and McNary. Much of the range is within the Fort Apache Indian Reservation.

The highest summit is Mount Baldy, with an elevation of 11,400 feet (3,475 m). The mountains are drained to the south by several tributaries of the Salt River, and to the north by the Little Colorado River. There are several small lakes.

The part of the White Mountains outside the reservation is in the Apache-Sitgreaves National Forests.

The White Mountains are the location of the 1993 motion picture “Fire In The Sky”, a true story of five Arizona loggers accused of committing a hoax or murderous crime after they report a crew member’s (Travis Walton) mysterious disappearance and possible alien abduction, occurring in 1975.

Physiographic regions of Arizona

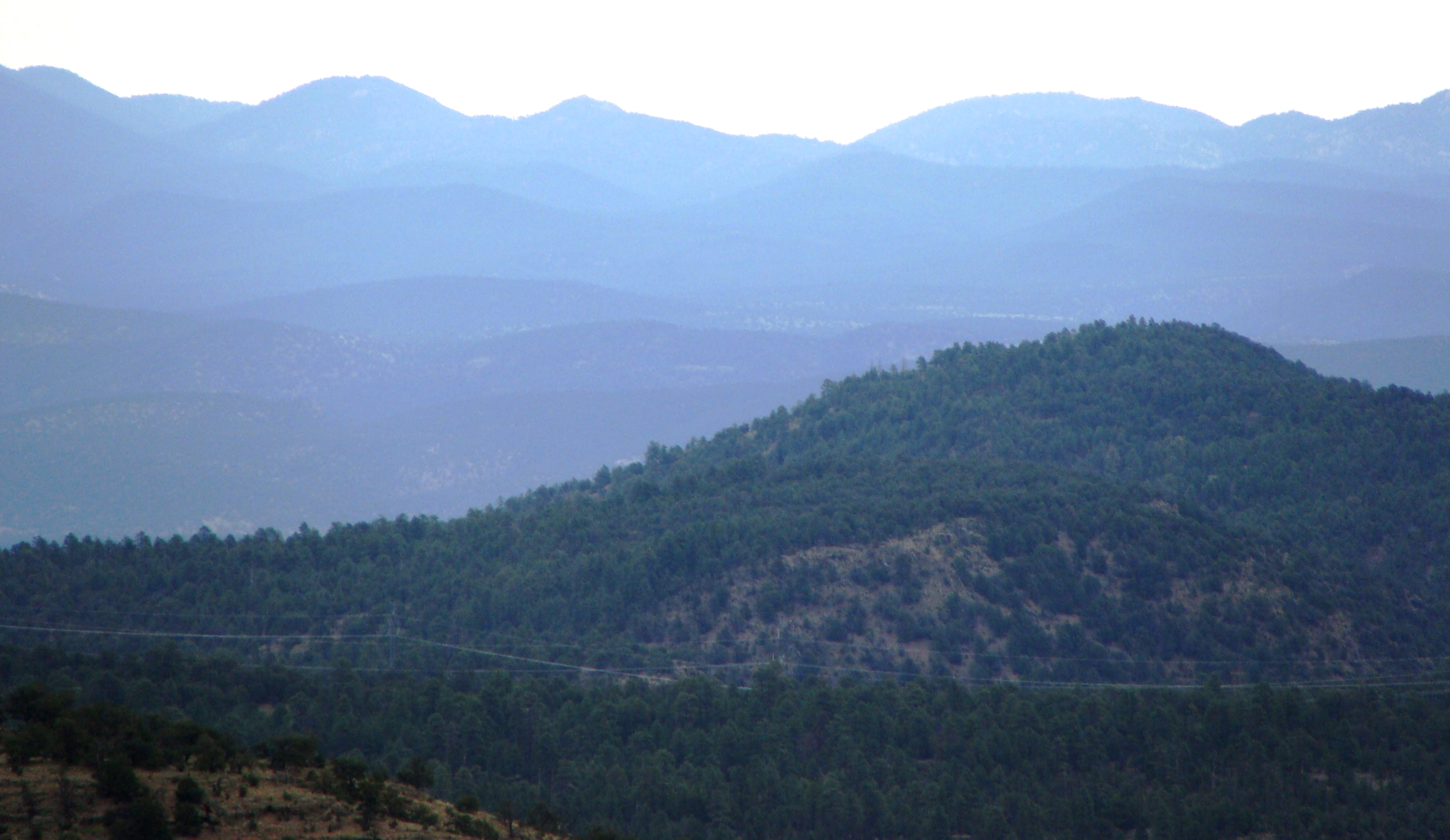
Apache-Sitgreaves National Forest near Luna, New Mexico

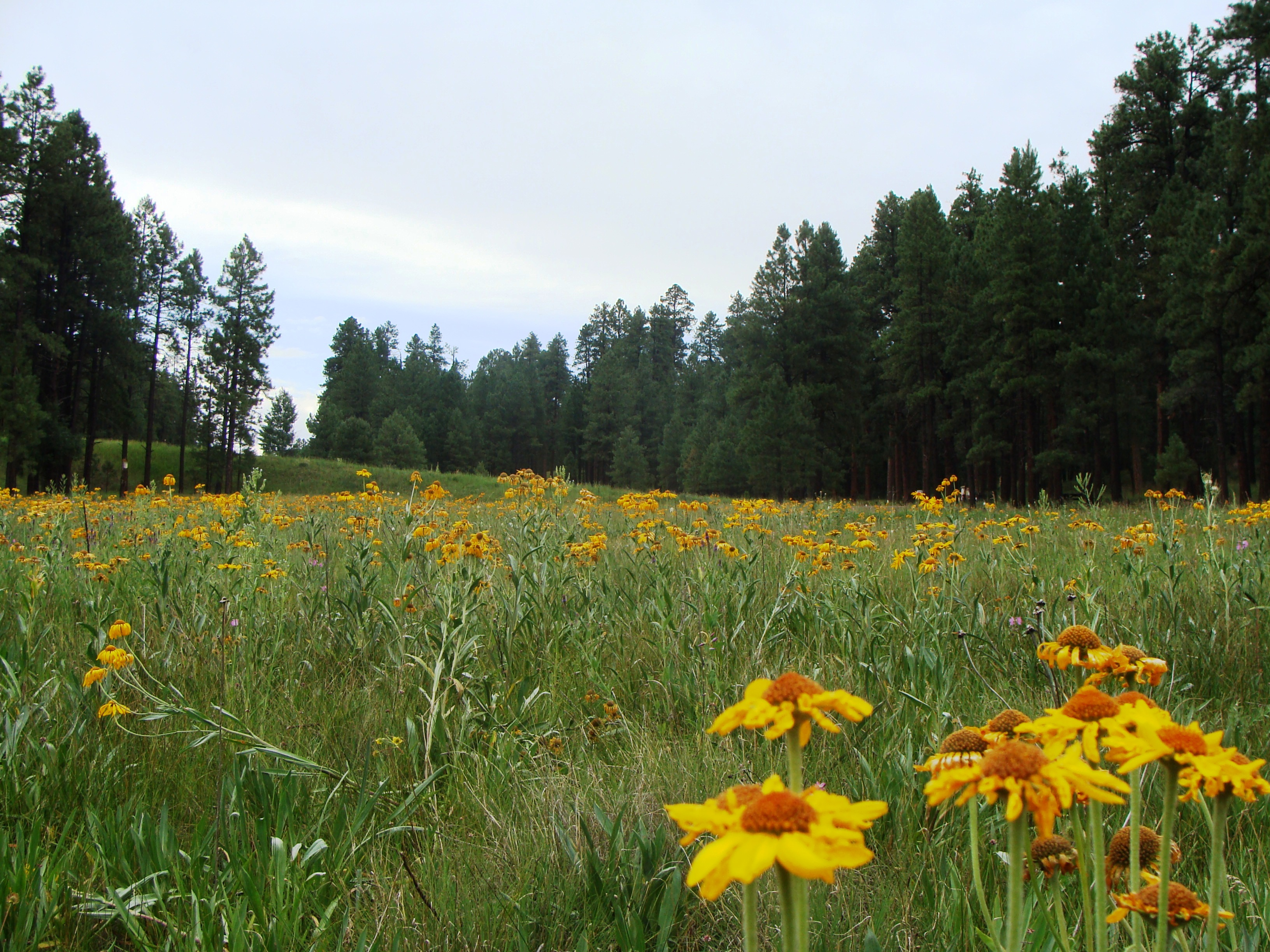
Wildflowers near Alpine, Arizona
