= Luna, New Mexico =

Census-designated place in Luna County, New Mexico, United States

- Census-designated place
- Location within the state of New Mexico Location in the United States
- Coordinates: 33°49′05″N 108°56′37″W
- Country: United States
- State: New Mexico
- County: Catron
- Named for: Solomon Luna

Area
  - Total: 5.57 sq mi (14.42 km^{2})
  - Land: 5.56 sq mi (14.40 km^{2})
  - Water: 0.0077 sq mi (0.02 km^{2})
- Elevation: 7,008 ft (2,136 m)

Population (2020)
  - Total: 194
  - Density: 34.9/sq mi (13.47/km^{2})
- Time zone: UTC-5 (Mountain (MST))
  - Summer (DST): MDT
- Area code: 575
- GNIS feature ID: 2584149

Luna is a census-designated place in northwestern Catron County, New Mexico, United States. As of the 2020 census, Luna had a population of 194. It is situated on the San Francisco River and U.S. Route 180, 7 miles (11 km) east of the Arizona border and 20 miles (32 km) northwest of Reserve, the Catron county seat.

== History ==
In the 19th century, Luna was part of the extensive lands of Solomon Luna, and the valley was used for sheep ranching. It briefly was an outlaw hide-away, but was settled by Mormon ranchers in 1883 and subject to Chiricahua Apache attacks until the surrender of Geronimo. The town was named after Don Salomon Luna.

The post office was opened in 1886.

== Demographics ==
Historical population
Census	Pop.	Note	%±
2020	194		—
U.S. Decennial Census

== Education ==
It is in the Reserve Independent School District.

== Climate ==
Luna has an oceanic climate (Köppen Cfb), bordering on a humid continental climate (Köppen Dfb).

Climate data for Luna Ranger Station, New Mexico, 1991–2020 normals, extremes 1903–2015: 7050ft (2149m)
Month	Jan	Feb	Mar	Apr	May	Jun	Jul	Aug	Sep	Oct	Nov	Dec	Year
Record high °F (°C)	72 (22)	76 (24)	81 (27)	89 (32)	96 (36)	101 (38)	100 (38)	97 (36)	97 (36)	87 (31)	80 (27)	73 (23)	101 (38)
Mean maximum °F (°C)	63.3 (17.4)	64.8 (18.2)	70.6 (21.4)	77.2 (25.1)	84.3 (29.1)	91.5 (33.1)	92.6 (33.7)	88.2 (31.2)	84.6 (29.2)	78.4 (25.8)	70.5 (21.4)	64.2 (17.9)	93.7 (34.3)
Mean daily maximum °F (°C)	51.9 (11.1)	54.6 (12.6)	60.9 (16.1)	67.2 (19.6)	75.4 (24.1)	85.0 (29.4)	85.3 (29.6)	81.8 (27.7)	78.5 (25.8)	71.0 (21.7)	60.7 (15.9)	52.3 (11.3)	68.7 (20.4)
Daily mean °F (°C)	32.7 (0.4)	35.6 (2.0)	40.1 (4.5)	45.9 (7.7)	52.5 (11.4)	61.2 (16.2)	66.4 (19.1)	64.5 (18.1)	58.8 (14.9)	48.8 (9.3)	39.3 (4.1)	32.6 (0.3)	48.2 (9.0)
Mean daily minimum °F (°C)	13.5 (−10.3)	16.5 (−8.6)	19.3 (−7.1)	24.5 (−4.2)	29.7 (−1.3)	37.4 (3.0)	47.5 (8.6)	47.2 (8.4)	39.1 (3.9)	26.7 (−2.9)	18.0 (−7.8)	13.0 (−10.6)	27.7 (−2.4)
Mean minimum °F (°C)	−4.6 (−20.3)	−0.8 (−18.2)	4.4 (−15.3)	10.6 (−11.9)	17.6 (−8.0)	25.5 (−3.6)	35.9 (2.2)	38.0 (3.3)	26.9 (−2.8)	13.3 (−10.4)	1.5 (−16.9)	−8.4 (−22.4)	−11.8 (−24.3)
Record low °F (°C)	−32 (−36)	−31 (−35)	−18 (−28)	−5 (−21)	7 (−14)	18 (−8)	26 (−3)	30 (−1)	19 (−7)	2 (−17)	−25 (−32)	−32 (−36)	−32 (−36)
Average precipitation inches (mm)	1.21 (31)	1.05 (27)	0.82 (21)	0.45 (11)	0.68 (17)	0.61 (15)	3.37 (86)	3.84 (98)	2.16 (55)	1.42 (36)	0.86 (22)	1.11 (28)	17.58 (447)
Average snowfall inches (cm)	5.4 (14)	1.7 (4.3)	1.4 (3.6)	0.7 (1.8)	0.0 (0.0)	0.0 (0.0)	0.0 (0.0)	0.0 (0.0)	0.0 (0.0)	0.1 (0.25)	1.4 (3.6)	6.9 (18)	17.6 (45.55)
Average precipitation days (≥ 0.01 in)	5.3	4.7	4.6	3.2	3.8	4.0	15.3	15.4	8.2	4.9	3.8	5.0	78.2
Average snowy days (≥ 0.1 in)	2.4	1.5	1.3	0.7	0.0	0.0	0.0	0.0	0.0	0.1	0.7	2.4	9.1
Source 1: NOAA
Source 2: XMACIS2 (records & 1981-2010 monthly max/mins)

== Culture ==
"Mormon Pioneer Day" is celebrated on the Saturday closest to July 24 at the village rodeo grounds with a parade, rodeo and dance.

On the 4th of July, festivities are held as well as a cake making contest.

== See also ==
- List of census-designated places in New Mexico
