= River Reservoir =

Waterbody in Apache County, Arizona

- Location within Arizona
- Location: Apache County, Arizona, United States
- Coordinates: 34°2′0.96″N 109°26′11.51″W
- Type: Reservoir
- Basin countries: United States
- Surface area: 50 acres (20 ha)
- Average depth: 20 ft (6.1 m)
- Surface elevation: 8,220 ft (2,510 m)

Built in 1896 on the Little Colorado River, River Reservoir is the largest and deepest of a trio of lakes collectively known as the Greer Lakes. Drained since 2004 because of safety issues, the dam at River Reservoir was repaired in 2005. Like the other two Greer Lakes, it has new amenities. River Reservoir is located at 8,220 feet (2,510 m) on the Apache-Sitgreaves National Forests.

== Description ==
River Reservoir has 50 acres (20 ha) with a maximum depth of 45 feet (14 m) and an average depth of 20 feet (6.1 m). The Arizona Game and Fish Department stocks River Reservoir with fingerling rainbow trout in the spring and catchable-sized rainbow trout in the spring and summer. Like its two neighboring reservoirs, River gets a few brown trout from the LCR diversion that refills it in the winter, but browns are not stocked here.

== Fish species ==
- Rainbow
- Brown
