= Eagar School =

USA NRHP building

- U.S. National Register of Historic Places
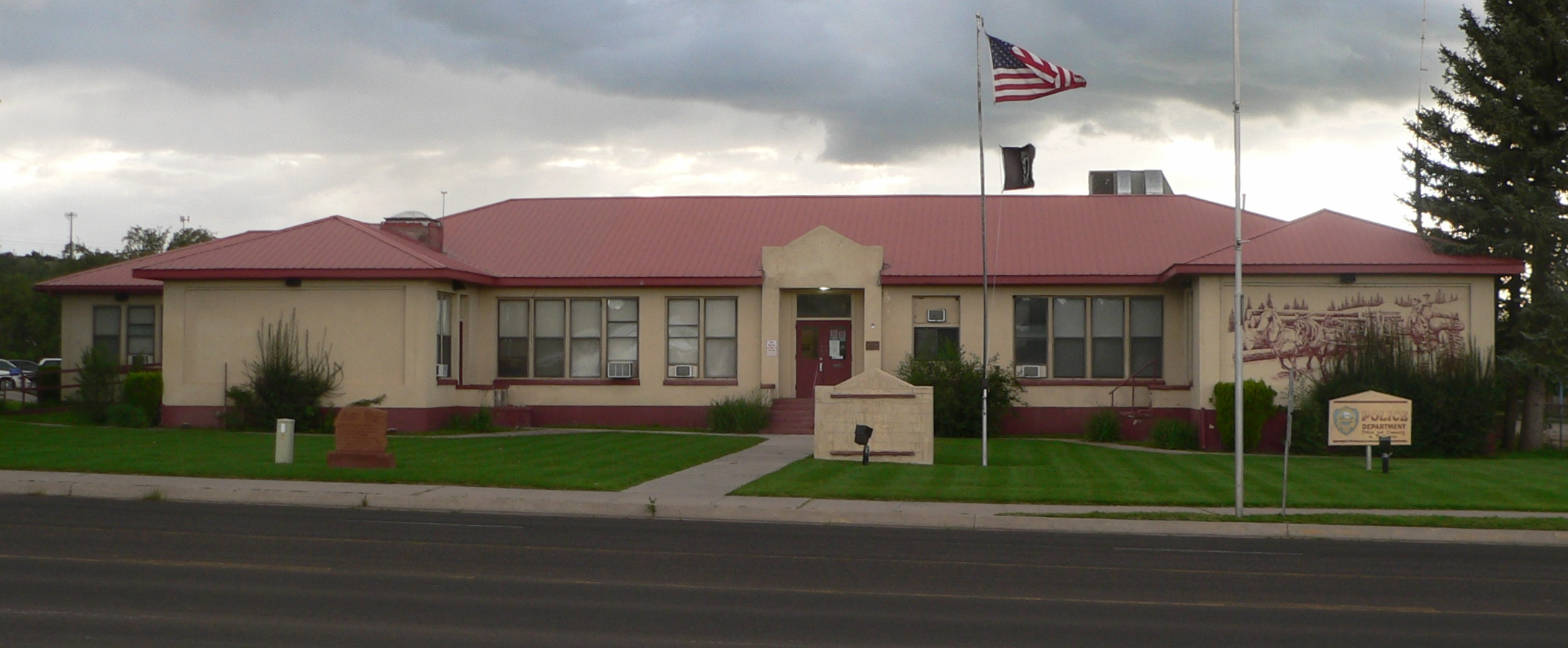
- Current picture of Eagar School (now the town's police station)

- Location within Arizona Location within the United States
- Location: 174 S. Main St., Eagar, Arizona
- Coordinates: 34°6′29″N 109°17′30″W
- Area: 4.5 acres (1.8 ha)
- NRHP reference No.: 93000624
- Added to NRHP: July 22, 1993

The Eagar School is a one-story building consisting of six rooms located in Eagar, Arizona. It was originally built in 1930, with a large addition added in 1951. During the 1980s it was no longer used as a schoolhouse, becoming the town hall of Eagar, and would later become the town's police station.

== History ==
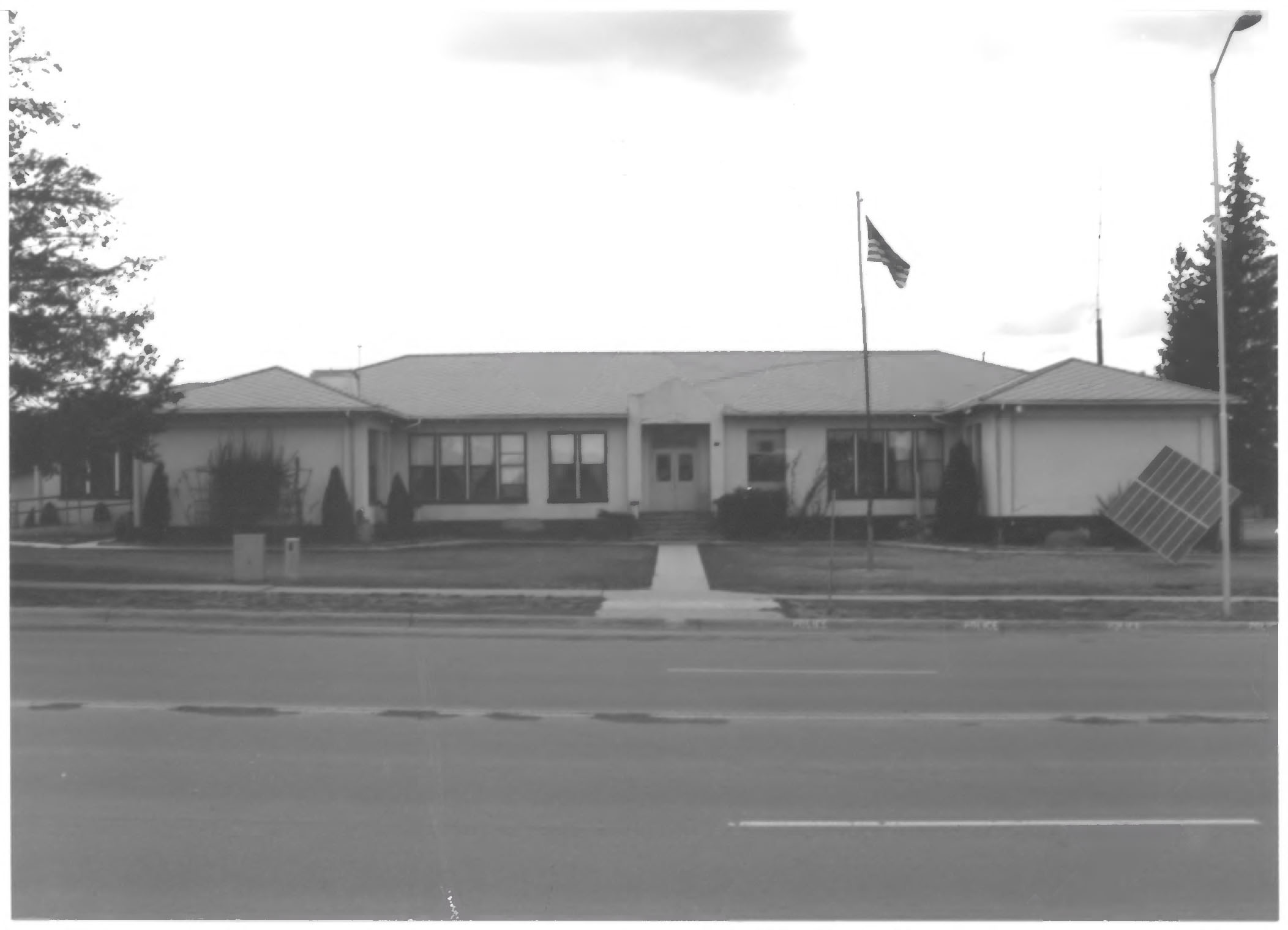
Eagar School ca. 1992, front of building

There were several schools in Eagar, dating back to the 1890s. A new building was built in 1927, however while school was in session on Friday, January 10, 1930, the building caught fire from a spark from one of the wood-burning stoves used for heat. Within 30 minutes, the building burned to the ground, with no loss of life. It was after this disaster that the building currently known as Eagar school was constructed.

All that remained of the school's furniture and fixtures after the fire were 3 tables, 3 dozen chairs, a Victor phonograph, a piano, and some desks and books. School continued on Monday in the nearby LDS ward chapel. On April 5, a bond issuance of $21,000 was approved for the construction of a new school building. However, there were difficulties with the results, and the final bond issuance was not approved until mid-August 1930. However, without waiting for final approval, bids for construction went out in the late Spring. By mid-June, eleven bids had been received, and the winning bid was from Albert Copeland of Mesa, for the sum of $21,125.

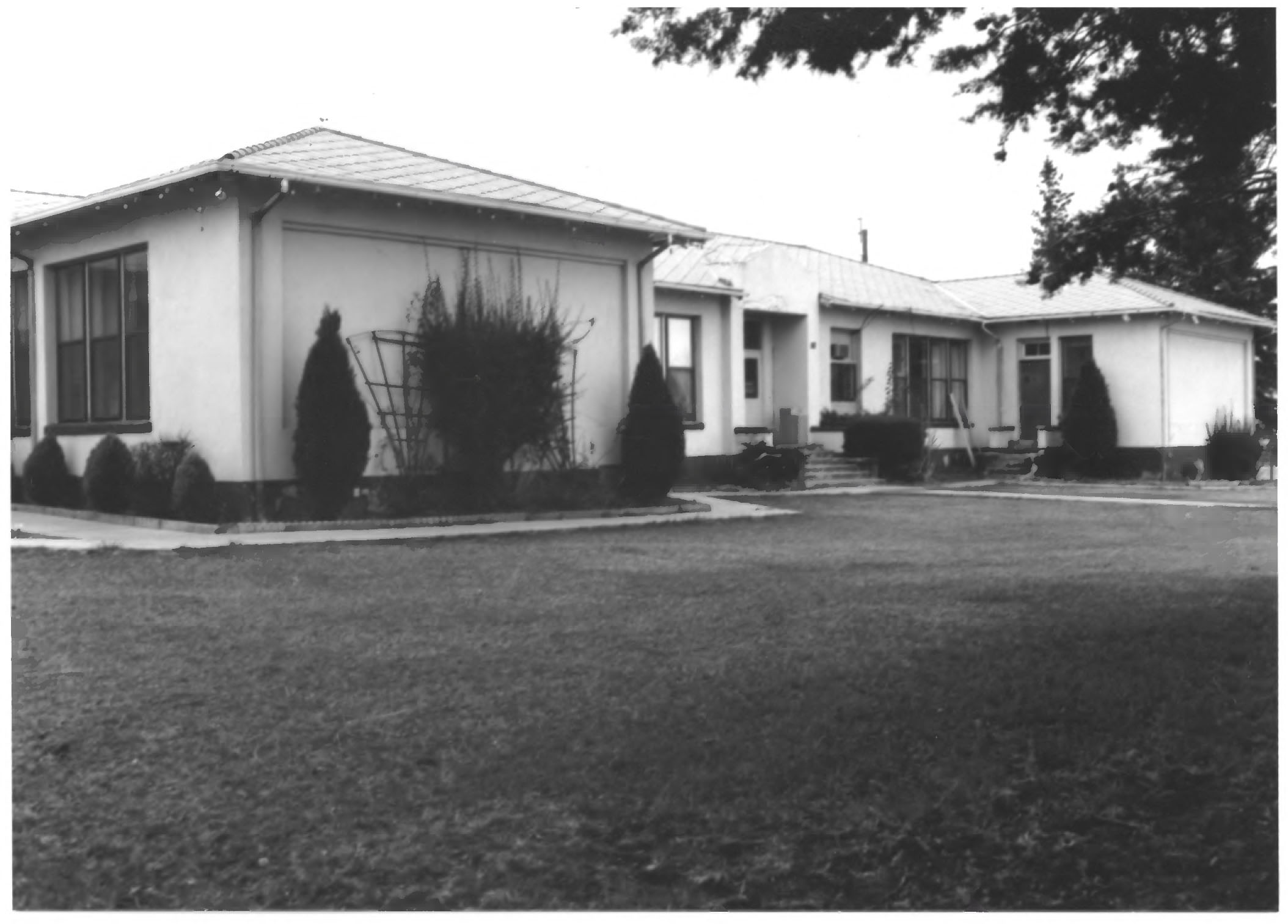
Eagar School ca. 1992, rear of building

Copeland began digging the basement in advance of the bond issuance, then continued pouring the foundation, and beginning construction of the brick structure. He utilized bricks from the Francis and Simpson Day brickyard, located on the banks of the nearby Little Colorado River. While Copeland anticipated that construction would be completed by November, the school was not officially dedicated until December 6, 1930. The following year (1931–32), the school had a principal and seven teachers. By 1940, the community felt the school needed a kitchen and cafeteria, which were added to the south side of that structure that year.

Between 1940 and 1980, there were 5 more additions to the school. In 1959, Greer consolidated its schools with Eagar. In 1969 the consolidation of the local school districts of Alpine, Nutrioso, and Springerville, led to the Eagar school being utilized for classes for 4th through 8th grade, while the younger students used the school building in Springerville. By the 1980s, the growth of the community created a need for a larger school. With the construction of a new school, the Eagar school was no longer utilized as a school building as of January 1984. That month it became the town hall for Eagar. At some point, the town hall was relocated to its current address at 22 W. 2nd Street, and the Eagar school became the home to the Eagar police department.

== Structure ==
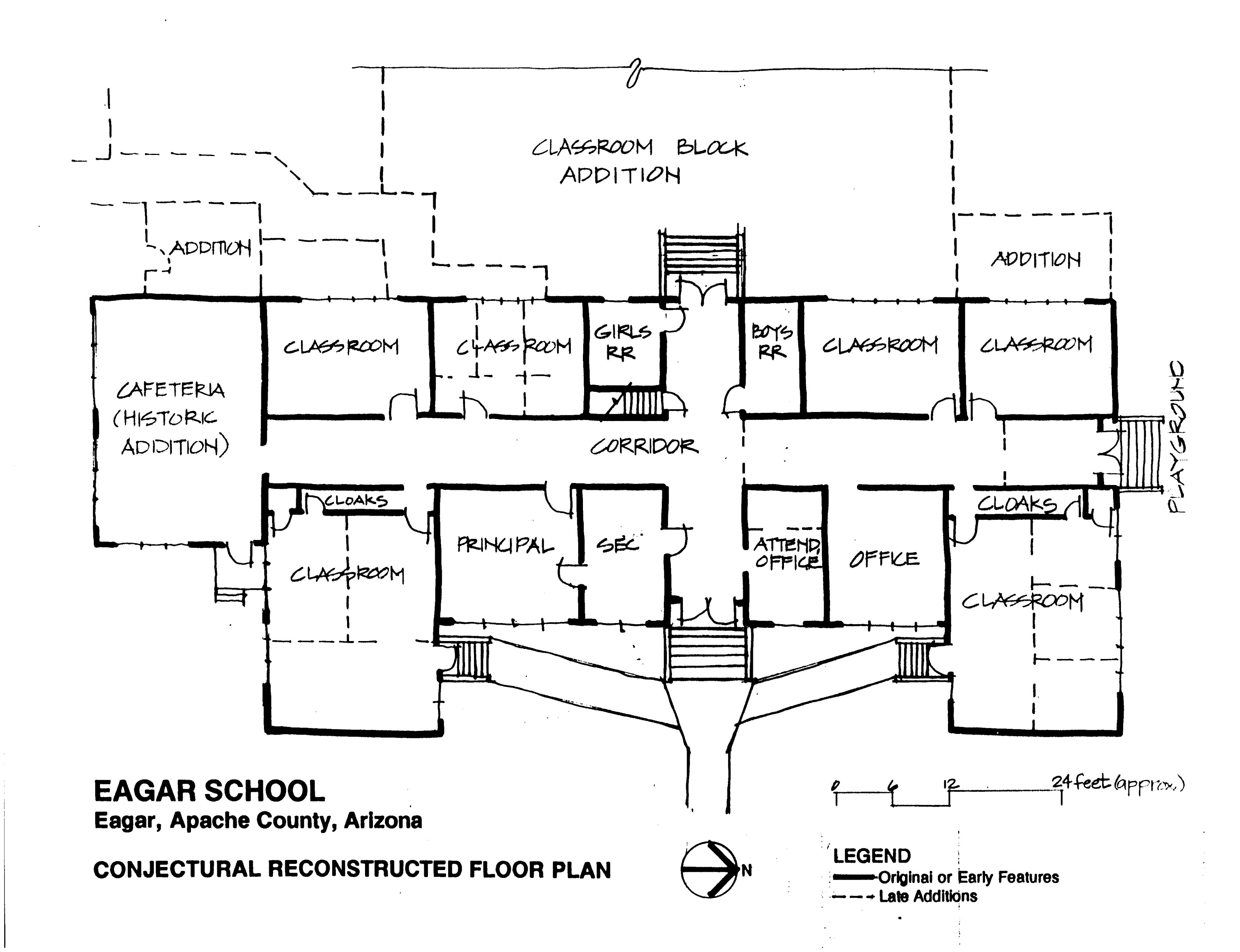
Original floor plan

The building sits at the southeast corner of Main and Second Streets. Originally, the building included 6 classrooms, 4 offices (principal's, secretary's, attendance, and main), and 2 restrooms. The central façade is flanked by two small wings, which protrude slightly towards Main Street, forming a small "C" shape. The foundation and walls are brick, which has since been stuccoed over. The windows were double-hung, three-over-three wood construction, in vertical proportion in groups of two to four with common sills. These have been replaced by aluminum windows, one-over-one single hung inserted into the original sash frames. Doors were originally "wooden, single- light doors with multi-light transoms overhead", with most now replaced by modern units. Broad stairs led to the main entries in the front, back, and both sides, although the stairs on the south side were destroyed with the construction of the cafeteria addition. There are also several smaller sets of steps leading to the outside from minor entrances. The entrances are framed by pedimented parapets, which sit on pilasters. The roof has a low pitch with wide overhangs, and is covered with asbestos tiles in a diamond pattern.

== See also ==
- National Register of Historic Places listings in Apache County, Arizona
- Eagar Townsite Historic District
- National Register of Historic Places listings in Apache County, Arizona
- Colter Ranch Historic District
