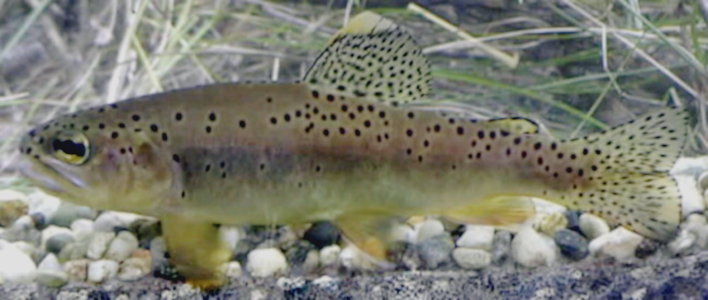

Conservation status
- Critically Endangered (IUCN 2.3)

- Delisted (ESA)

Scientific classification
- Kingdom: Animalia
- Phylum: Chordata
- Class: Actinopterygii
- Order: Salmoniformes
- Family: Salmonidae
- Genus: Oncorhynchus
- Species: O. apache

Binomial name
- Oncorhynchus apache (R. R. Miller, 1972)

= Apache trout =

Species of fish

The Apache trout or Arizona trout (Oncorhynchus apache), is a species of freshwater fish in the salmon family (family Salmonidae) of order Salmoniformes. It is closely related to Gila trout and is one of the critically endangered Pacific trouts.

== Description ==
The Apache trout measures in length from 6 to 24 in (15–61 cm), and weighs between 0.4 to 6 lb (0.2–2.7 kg). It rarely exceeds 10 in (25 cm), but can reach up to 16 in (40 cm) in its native, headwater streams. Apache trout are a yellowish-gold color with a golden belly and have medium-sized dark spots that are evenly spaced and that may extend below the lateral line and onto the dorsal and tail fins. The top of its head and back are dark olive in color, and it has the appearance of having a black stripe/mask through each of its eyes, due to two small black dots on either side of the pupil. There can be a throat mark below the lower jaw, ranging in color from yellow to gold.

== Distribution ==
The Apache trout is the state fish of Arizona, and is one of only two species of trout native to that state, with the other being closely related the gila trout (O. g. gilae). It natively lives in clear, cool streams in the White Mountains that flow through coniferous forests and marshes, but has been introduced into several lakes in the area. The Apache trout is native to the upper Salt River watershed (Black and White rivers) and the upper Little Colorado River watershed. Apache trout have been introduced into isolated streams outside of their historic range in the Pinaleño Mountains and the North Rim of the Grand Canyon. Apache trout exist in their most pure form within headwater streams at an elevation of 2,100 meters (6,900 feet) or higher in the White Mountain Apache Reservation.

== Life history ==
The Apache trout spawns from March to the middle of June, and varies with elevations. Maturity was found to occur in three years, and fecundity is based on the size of trout. One female typically produces from 72 to 240 eggs in 13.1 to 19.1 cm (5.2 to 7.5 in) fish and from 646 to 1,083 eggs in 29.8 to 34.9 cm (11.7 to 13.7 in) fish. The eggs hatch after 30 days. The Apache trout eats both terrestrial and aquatic insects, such as Trichoptera and Diptera. In lakes, they also eat small fishes and zooplankton.

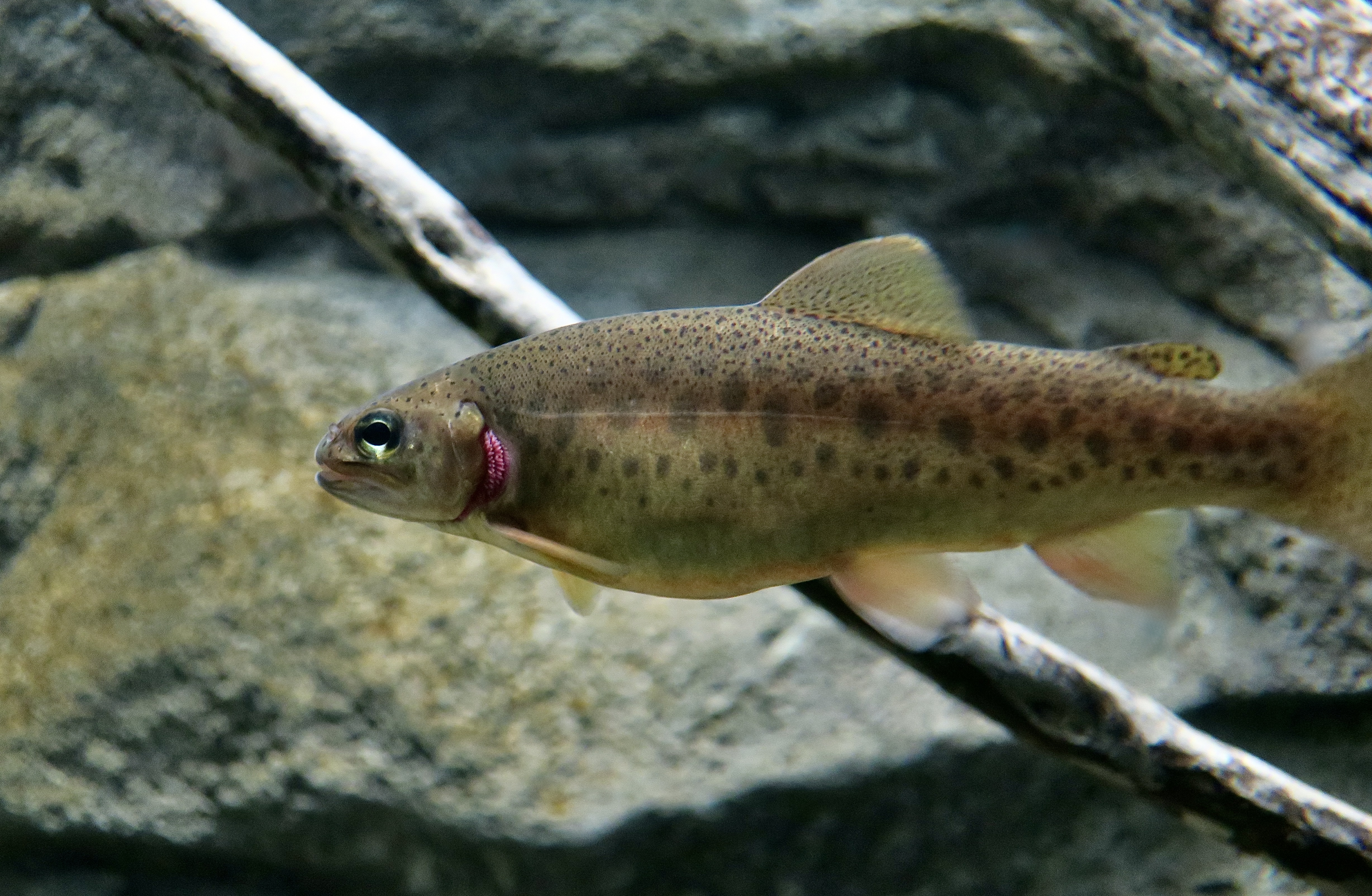
Young Apache trout at OdySea Aquarium.

== Conservation ==
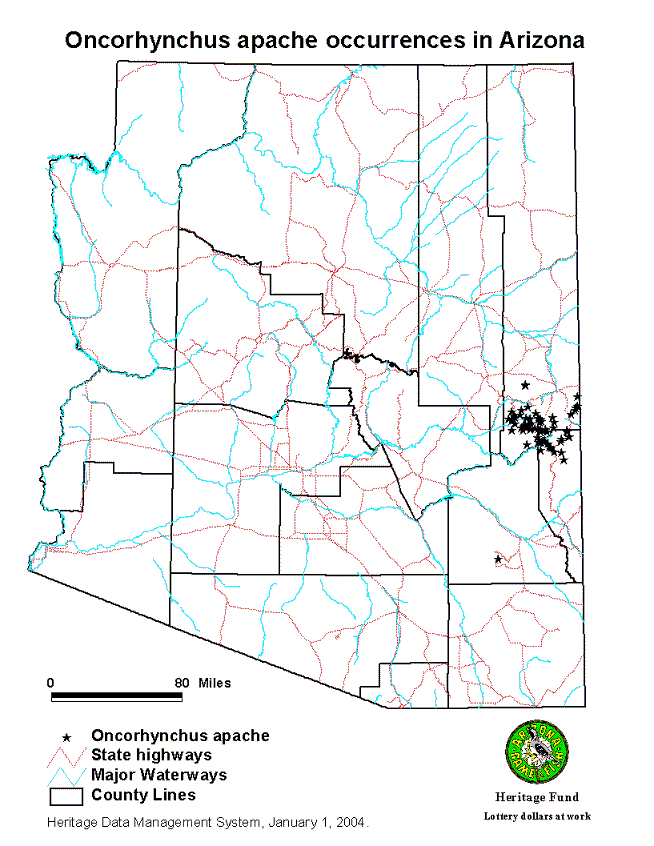
Map showing Apache Trout occurrences in Arizona

Recovery and management efforts for Apache trout have been ongoing since the 1940s. Apache trout are raised in federal and state hatcheries, and reared fish have been used to assist with recovery and to maintain populations for sport fishing in certain streams and reservoirs.

While the IUCN considers the Apache trout to be critically endangered, it has been delisted under the Endangered Species Act. Around 100 years ago, they could be found in 600 miles (970 km) of streams in the White Mountains. By the late 1960s, their range had been reduced to around 30 miles (48 km) of these streams. Once the Endangered Species Act of 1969 was passed, they became one of the first species listed under it. When this act was replaced by the Endangered Species Act of 1973, they became one of the first fish species protected under the newer Act. (Note: They were moved to "threatened" status, having originally been listed as endangered.) Population numbers for this species are still rising.

Today, major risks to the Apache trout are its easy hybridization with the rainbow trout and major forest fires. Cutthroat trout are also genetically similar and cross-breed with Apache trout, compromising the genetic purity of each species. The range of the Apache trout remains limited, which puts it at risk, but it is now common enough that limited fishing is permitted.

Ongoing conservation efforts by the White Mountain Apache Tribe have helped to preserve the subspecies.

Many of the Mount Baldy headwater streams that are the stronghold of Apache trout are entirely closed to fishing. Catch and release fishing opportunities for wild (stream born), pure-strain Apache trout exist in a limited number of areas. Additionally, there are numerous consumptive fishing opportunities for Apache trout in waters where natural reproduction is not occurring and the Apache trout population is the result of stocking efforts.

The 2011 Wallow Fire resulted in the loss of stream barriers erected to prevent hybridization and the extirpation of Apache trout from Coleman Creek and likely of hybridized populations elsewhere, while the 2017 Frye Fire destroyed a stocked population in Ash Creek in the Pinaleño Mountains. Climate change causing rising temperatures and increasing frequency and intensity of wildfires threatens the existence of Apache trout.
