= Gila trout =

Conservation status
- Endangered (IUCN 2.3)

Scientific classification
- Kingdom: Animalia
- Phylum: Chordata
- Class: Actinopterygii
- Division: Teleostei
- Order: Salmoniformes
- Family: Salmonidae
- Genus: Oncorhynchus
- Species: O. gilae

Binomial name
- Oncorhynchus gilae (R. R. Miller, 1950)

Species of fish

The Gila trout (Oncorhynchus gilae) is a species of salmonid, related to the rainbow trout, native to the southwestern United States. Prior to 2006 the Gila trout was federally listed as endangered. In July 2006, after much work by the New Mexico Department of Game and Fish and Arizona Game and Fish Department, the United States Forest Service and the United States Fish and Wildlife Service, the Gila trout was down-listed to threatened, with a special provision called a "4d rule" that will allow limited sport fishing – for the first time in nearly half a century. By the time the Gila trout was closed to fishing in the 1950s, its numbers and range were so depleted and so reduced this copper-colored trout simply wasn't very accessible to anglers. As of 2011 there is fishing in both states for this fish.

== Range ==
The Gila trout is native to tributaries of the Gila River in Arizona and New Mexico. The Gila trout is found historically in the Verde and Agua Fria drainages in Arizona. A note in the archives of Aldo Leopold, dated 1923, contains anecdotal evidence of a native trout in Tonto Creek, AZ. Gila trout have persisted in five streams within the Gila National Forest, New Mexico, including: Iron, McKenna, and Spruce creeks in the Gila Wilderness Area, along with Main and South Diamond creeks in the Aldo Leopold Wilderness Area.

== Description ==
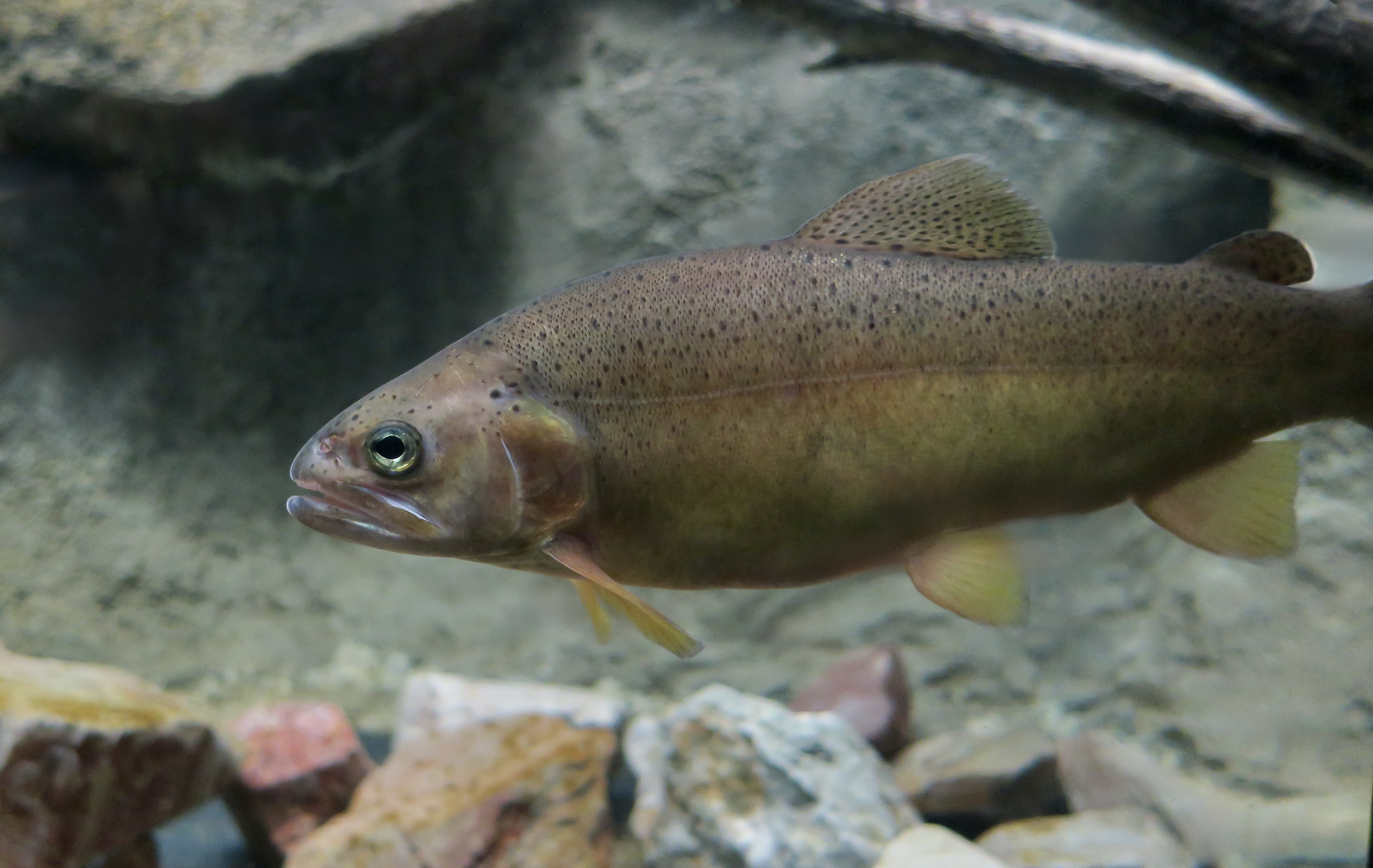
Gila trout at OdySea Aquarium.

Gila trout have a yellow body, with black spots. The average total length is about 30 cm (11.8 in); with maximum total length approximately 55 cm (21.7 in). Gila trout are closely related to Apache trout. However, Apache trout can have a spot behind and in front of the pupil (eye) and big noticeable spots on the body whereas Gila trout are characterized by numerous small dark spots on the upper half of the body.

== Biology ==
Gila trout can be found in small mountain water streams, and in confined pools. They are opportunistic feeders that feed on aquatic insects such as trichopterans, ephemeropterans, chironomids, and coleopterans, as well as small fishes.

== Reproduction ==
Depending on the water temperature, spawning season occurs in late spring and summer. The number of eggs produced from females held in hatcheries averaged about 150. The maximum fecundity observed was 686 eggs.

== Conservation ==
The Gila trout has been threatened by competition and hybridization with introduced game fish such as the rainbow trout. However, the primary cause of reduced Gila trout populations is habitat loss caused by loss of water flow and shade-giving trees, caused in turn by fires, human destruction of riparian vegetation, livestock overgrazing, agricultural irrigation and water diversion, and channelization of streams in the Gila trout's native range. By the time the Gila trout was listed by the U.S. Fish and Wildlife Service in 1967 its range had reduced from several hundred miles of stream to just 20 in the Gila Wilderness and Aldo Leopold Wilderness. After listing USFWS began an aggressive program of stream restoration, removing the introduced trout, restoring and repairing riparian vegetation (to maintain cooler water temperatures), and restocking restored streams with young Gila trout. The Mora National Fish Hatchery and Technology Center in northern New Mexico keeps brood stocks of the Gila trout and supplies the fish for restocking. The species is now more secure than it was in the 1970s, having been moved to 10 new streams, though populations and habitat are still far below those originally established. Conservationists hope to eventually delist the species and allow fishing, thus forming alliances with fishermen in order to help preserve the species. Major wildfires and drought will always play a major role in the status of any trout species.
