= Eagar Townsite Historic District =

- U.S. National Register of Historic Places
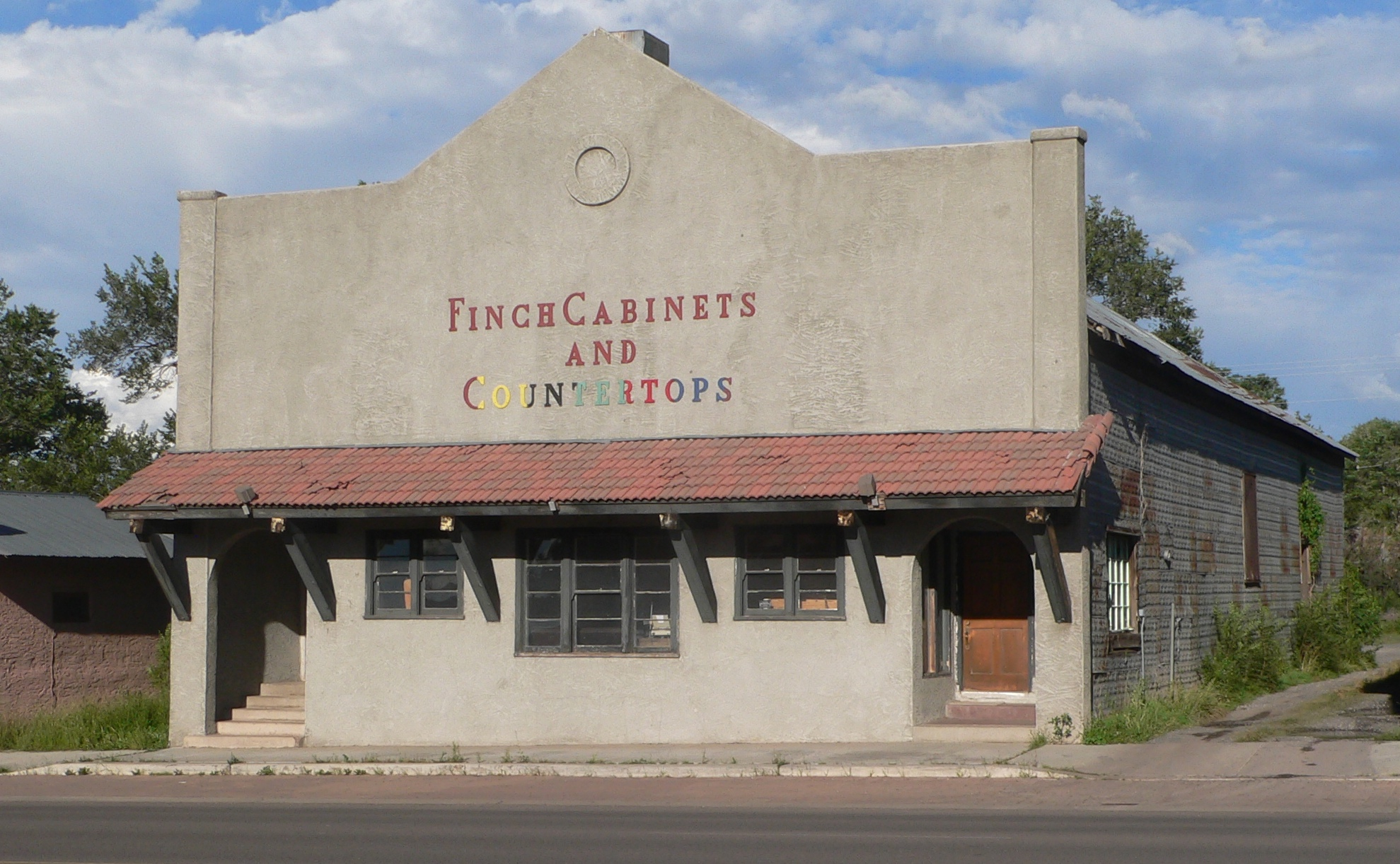
- "Grapevine Hall" building at 45 N. Main Street

- Location within Arizona Location within the United States
- Location: Eagar, Arizona
- Coordinates: 34°6′29″N 109°17′30″W
- Area: 54 acres (22 ha)
- Architectural style: National Folk, Bungalow, Spanish Colonial Revival
- NRHP reference No.: 93000625
- Added to NRHP: July 23, 1993

Eagar Townsite Historic District is a section of the town of Eagar, Arizona which has been designated a National Historic Place. Sitting on roughly 54 acres, the site contains 37 structures, 21 of which have historical significance. The period of significance is from 1886, the year the townsite was founded, through 1942, which represents the significant period of development of the town. The site was added to the Register on July 23, 1993.

== History ==
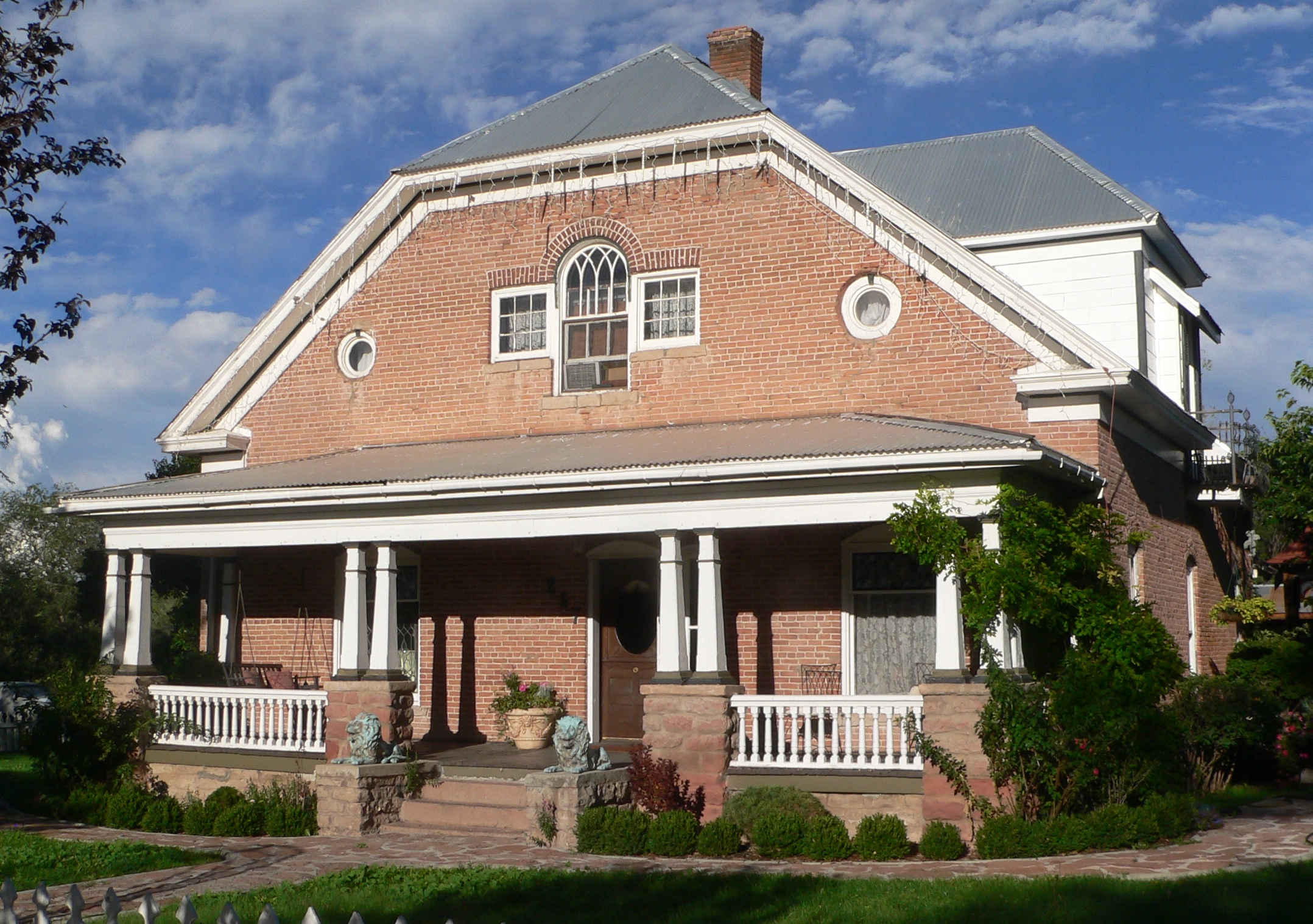
William La Sueur house

The Church of Jesus Christ of Latter-day Saints leaders in Salt Lake City consolidated the Omer and Amity wards into the Union Ward in 1886, the ward was centered on the newly formed townsite of Eagar. The town had been founded by three brothers: John T., William, and Joel Eagar. The Eager brothers had come to the Round Valley area along the Little Colorado in 1879, settling near Springerville in 1882. By 1885 they had relocated further south to the land which would become Eagar. The original townsite was divided as per the Mormon City of Zion concept. That concept was for every square mile was broken up into ten-acre square blocks separated by streets of 132 foot widths. The blocks were then further divided into half-acre lots, each 66 feet wide, creating 20 lots, ten on a side. While Eagar followed the general concept, the blocks and streets were slightly smaller, approximately 500 foot square and 90 foot wide, respectively. An irrigation system was developed, utilizing water from the Little Colorado River by way of the "Big Ditch" canal. The irrigation system is one of the most extensive of any Mormon community in Arizona. In approximately 1890 the oldest structure still extant in the historic district, the Harry Colter house was built at 22 West 2nd Avenue.

During the 1900s, three more of the contributing structures to the historic site were constructed: the William La Sueur House at 287 North Main Street, a folk house at 36 West Central Avenue, and a barn at 236 North Main Street were constructed.

In 1910, Eagar was the third most populous town in Apache County, with 397 citizens in the 1910 census. Through most of the 1910s, through the end of World War I, the town prospered and grew, with an economy based on timber, cattle, sheep, and wool. The economy went into a slump with the collapse of commodity prices at the end of the World War, but the town had grown to 635 people by the 1920 census. In 1916 the Grapevine social hall, one of the contributing buildings to the present historic site, was constructed. Initially it was used for various social and community functions, such as dances, plays, benefits, and even served as a school classroom. When the township's high school opened, it became their basketball court in the 1920s. It was also the first electrically building in Eagar in 1927. In addition to the Grapevine structure, the 1910s also saw the construction of two other contributing buildings, both folk houses; one at 286 North Eagar Street and the other at 81 North Eagar Street.

Ten of the contributing properties of the historic district were built during the 1920s: seven bungalow-style houses, a folk house, a commercial building and a barn. The barn was part of the Joe Udall homestead, which consisted of an adobe house and the barn, which at the time was the largest barn in the town. The last three contributing buildings were all constructed around 1930. They were pueblo revival style house located at 266 North Main Street, a pueblo revival style duplex which sits at 28 North Main Street, and the Spanish colonial revival style house located at 60 East Central Avenue.

== Description of site ==
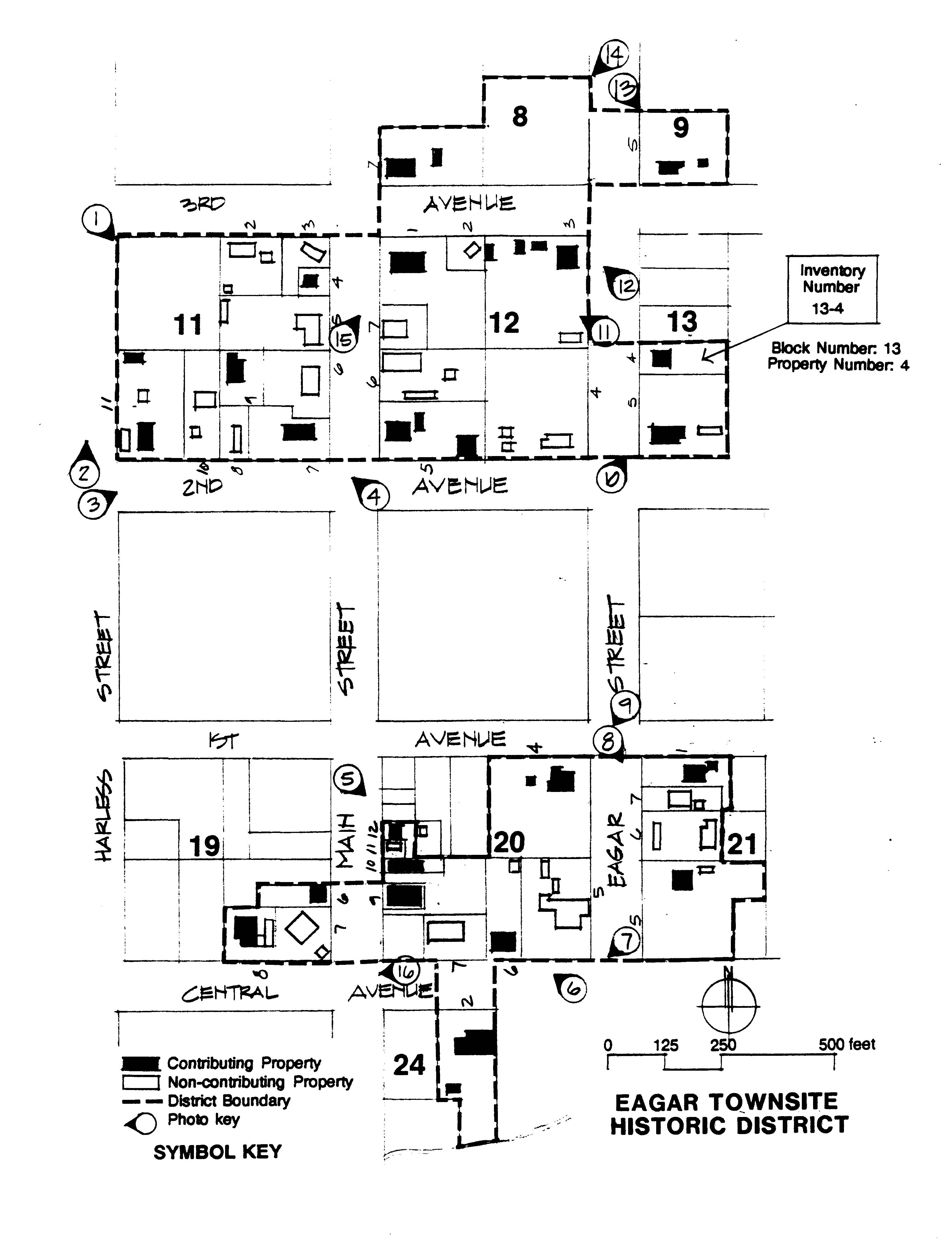
Eager Townsite Historic District map

The historic site consists of two discontiguous sections, separated by a city block. The northern section is irregularly shaped, stretching from northern side of Second Avenue to the northern side of Third Avenue, from Eagar street to Harless Street. The southern section is smaller, and also irregularly shaped, lying between First and Central Avenues, and from Eagar Street to just beyond Main Street. Both sections sit within the 1 1/2-mile by 1/4 mile area of the original townsite. While areas outside the historic district have seen significant development and alterations, within the two sections of the historic district much of the original historic character of the structures has been retained.

The block between the two sections of the historic site used to be filled with historic residences and the original Latter-Day Saints church. All have been demolished, and the blocks now contain the modern LDS church (east of Main Street), and a recent motel (west of Main).

Most of the historic structures lie on either Main Street (nine) or Eagar Street (seven), with the five on either Second or Central Avenues. The most northern building is a bungalow style house sitting at 313 North Main Street, while the southernmost structure is the Udall Barn. The Grapevine Hall sits on Main Street in the southern section of the site, while the Harry Colter and Leseur homes are located on Main Street in the northern section. The Leseur home is unusual in Eagar in that it is constructed of red brick, and in the Georgian Revival style.

== Historic structures and markers ==
The town of Eagar has various structures and locations which the town's historic society consider historical. These are identified with a marker which resemble a tombstone. Among them are those which have the markers description and which are pictured and listed here.

- The 26 Bar Hereford Ranch – "Once owned & often visited by film legend John Wayne, the ranch with the prominent white show barn came to fame in the 1940s as the Milky Way Hereford Ranch, owned by the Mars Candy Family."
- The Amity School Ruins – "The stone chimney is all that remains of a one-room country schoolhouse that served pioneer Amity pop. 119 from the early 1880s until closing in April 1930."
- The Benjamin B. Crosby Home – "An early 1900s adobe home built by the son of Eagar's first Mormon Bishop. Crosby, a major sheep & cattle rancher, was a railroad contractor who in 1917 laid the track for the Santa Fe Railroad north of here."
- The Colter Ranch – "Below among the large cottonwood trees are the historic hdqtrs of Fred T. Colter's Cross Bar Ranch. Originally homesteaded in 1881 by Texan Micajah Phelps, Colter built the ranch into one of the largest cattle operations in Northeastern AZ."
- The Eagar Elementary School – "After the original frame school house burned in 1930, this building served Eagar's children for 53 years. Mothers prepared hot lunch across the street creating Eagar's own depression era "soup lines" at 5 cents a cup for the children."
- The Harry Colter Home – "Completed in 1912 by J.P. LeSueur manager of the Eagar ACMI, this frame house with a skin of pressed metal wall sheathing is best known as home to one of the Colter Bros. important Round Valley Ranchers."
- The Joseph Udall Barn – "Built in the early 1900s by one of Eagar's prominent civic, religious & business leaders, this barn was constructed with wooden pegs & retains remarkable architectural integrity. The 2-story brick farmhouse no longer stands."
- The Oscar Jepson Home – "Built c.1892, this adobe structure once housed the Eagar School & later a bootlegger's still. Jepson purchased & enlarged the home in 1925 & moved his family from Alpine so his daughters could attend Round Valley High School."
- The Rencher Home – "On July 24, 1900, the Peter P. Rencher family arrived from Texas in four wagons & set about building their place in Eagar. Completed in 1913, this 5 bedroom, red brick Colonial Revival home was the crown jewel of their labors."
- The Snyder-Cavanaugh Shoot Out – "In 1878, this notorious outlaw gang clashed over dividing their loot. A heated gunfight occurred in the saddle of this hill."
- Snyder/Cavanaugh Burial Ground – "At least seven men died in the Snyder-Cavanaugh Shoot Out. when dirt was removed for the building of State Route 73 only the remains of three were found. These remains were relocated to this site and marked with a stone."
- The William LeSueur Home – "This handsome example of Colonial Revival architecture was home to the manager of Round Valley's ACMIs. His wife, the area's first registered nurse, boarded expectant mothers & teachers from the high school."

== See also ==
- National Register of Historic Places listings in Apache County, Arizona
- Eagar School
- Colter Ranch Historic District
