= Fred Colter =

American rancher and politician

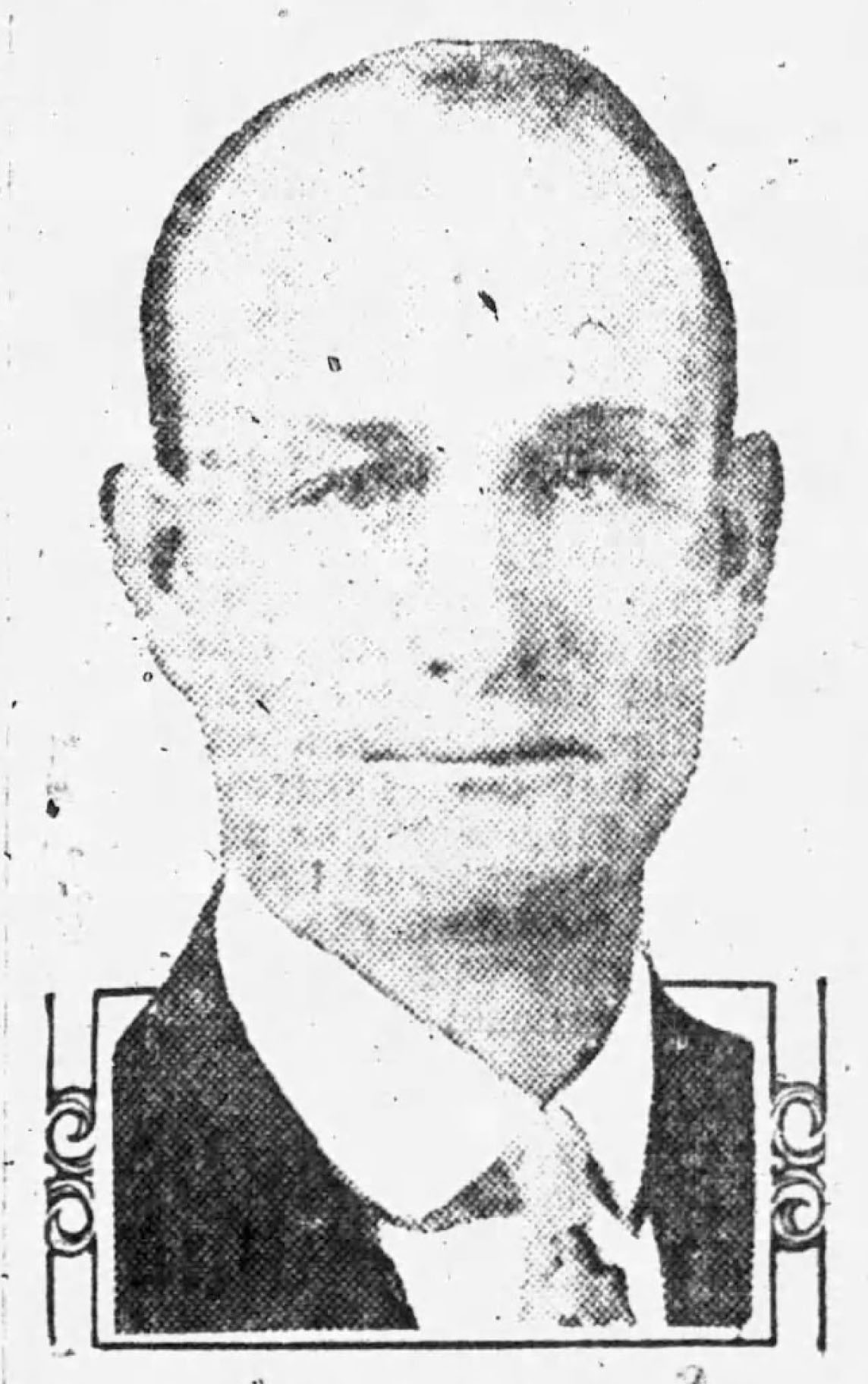

Member of the Arizona House of Representatives from the Apache County district
- In office January 1941 – December 1942
- In office January 1933 – December 1934

Member of the Arizona Senate from the Apache County district
- In office January 1923 – December 1928
- In office January 1915 – December 1918

Personal details
- Born: February 2, 1879 Nutrioso, Arizona Territory
- Died: January 8, 1944 (aged 64) Phoenix, Arizona, U.S.
- Party: Democratic
- Spouse: Sarah Dugan Phelps
- Profession: Rancher, farmer

Fred Tuttle Colter (February 2, 1879 – January 8, 1944) was an Arizona rancher and farmer, as well as being the state senator for Apache County beginning with Arizona's second state legislature in 1915. Colter spent six terms in the Arizona Senate. He also led the fight on Arizona's behalf to maintain control over the water from the Colorado River, coining the slogan, "Save the Colorado for Arizona". He was a close ally of the state's first governor, George W. P. Hunt. Prior to his election to the state senate, Colter had served as the state's fair commissioner.

== Early life ==
Fred T. Colter was born on February 2, 1879, in Nutrioso, Arizona, to James G. and Rosalia ("Rosa") Colter. James was one of the original settlers of Apache County, Arizona, originally from Nova Scotia. James met and married Rosa in Springerville, Arizona, in 1877. Colter, Arizona, now abandoned, was founded and named after the elder Colter in 1872. Colter's family gave up their Arizona homestead due to hostilities with the Indians, after which they moved near Alma, New Mexico. While in New Mexico in 1881, the elder Colter was part of a group of 27 male settlers who held off an attack of approximately 300 Apaches, while the infant Colter was held by his mother in a storeroom. The settlers were rescued when U.S. Cavalry troops arrived. As a young man, he worked as a cowboy and rancher, even becoming the champion steer roper in Apache County.

Colter worked as ranch hand and straw boss in the late 1890s and early 1900s. On November 11, 1904, at the age of 25, he married the forty year-old Sarah Dugan Phelps, known as "Duge". Duge had inherited her father's ranch, the Phelps Ranch, which was renamed after the marriage to Colter Ranch. The two left on a honeymoon trip, from which they returned in early December.

== Political activity ==
He served on the board of supervisors for Apache County from 1904 through 1912, along with Joseph Udall. A few months later, he purchased four lots of land on Central Avenue in Phoenix, on which he planned to build a winter home. In 1910 he was elected as a vice-president of the Arizona Cattle Growers Association, becoming the first person to hold that post. In 1910, he was nominated as the Democratic delegate to the Constitutional Convention for developing the state constitution for the soon-to-be state of Arizona. He was one of the two youngest members of the convention. While serving on the Constitutional Convention, he was made chairman of the committee on constitutional amendments. In this position he fathered a constitutional amendment for women's suffrage, which did not make it into the constitution. Governor Hunt appointed Colter to be the State Fair commissioner in February 1914, and in April 1914, Colter was one of the founding members of the Arizona Automobile Association, the first automotive group in the state. It would team up with the AAA. Later in 1914, Colter was elected to the first of six terms to the Arizona Senate. His election to the state senate necessitated his resignation as State Fair Commissioner in January 1915, prior to beginning his term as senator.

By early 1915, Colter was already considered a strong contender to be the successor to Governor Hunt. In 1916, he was elected to be the National Committeeman for the Democratic Party from Arizona, becoming only the second person to have ever held that post, having succeeded Reese Ling, who he beat in a contentious vote by the Democratic central committee. Colter was the head of Arizona's contingent of six delegates, which included George Babbitt and James S. Douglas. The state's Democratic party pledged their support to Woodrow Wilson. Colter ran unopposed in the Democratic primary for his re-election to the state senate in 1916, and he was re-elected in November 1916 to a second term in the Senate. During the 1916 election, Colter was credited for being responsible for Wilson carrying the state by 13,000 votes.

=== 1918 Arizona gubernatorial election ===
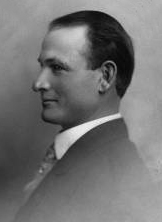
Fred T. Colter

In mid-1917, Colter made known his intentions to run for the governorship on the Democratic ticket in 1918. In declaring his intention to run, Colter said: "It has never occurred to me until recently that I could further assist in bringing about better results in the democratic situation by running for State office but, as I have had so many personal requests and letters from all over the state from people who think I am the logical man to get the party together, to counteract the immense Republican machine, I have decided to run for the governorship of the state." While he was seen as a strong candidate, it was not that there weren't several strong opponents vying for the Democratic nomination. When the former governor, Hunt, announced that he had no intention on contending for the governorship in 1918, Sidney Osborn was a favorite for the nomination, representing the more conservative arm of the Democratic Party, and Colter established himself as the favorite of what some considered the radical part of the Democrats. While Hunt did not openly endorse him, most of his backers threw their support behind Colter. In late February, another prominent Arizona Democrat, Benjamin Baker "Billy" Moeur announced his candidacy for the Democratic nomination for governor at the meeting of the Arizona Cattlemen's Association in Nogales, Arizona. In June, Judge Fred Sutter officially entered the race, although he had been discussed as a possible contender since March. After Sutter's entrance into the race, Hunt officially threw his support behind Colter. In the midst of the race, Colter purchased a large home at the southwest corner of Central Avenue and McKinley Street in Phoenix, for the sum of $20,000.

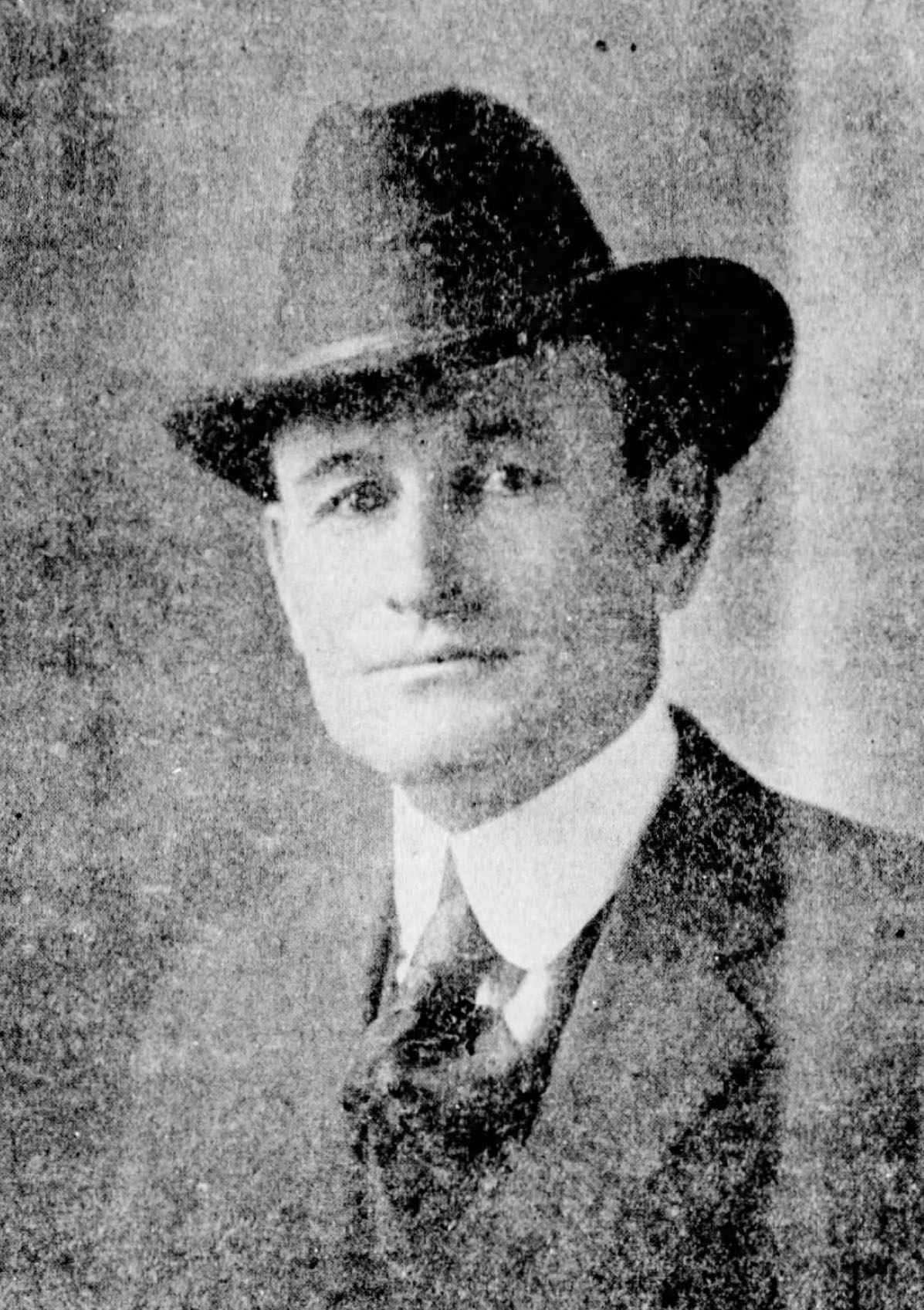
Colter, ca. 1918

On July 20, 1918, the last day to do so, Colter officially entered the gubernatorial race when he filed his petition with the Arizona Secretary of State. On the final day, Lamar Cobb added his name to the list of Democratic primary candidates, bringing the total to five. In mid-August, in an effort to consolidate the conservative arm of the Democratic party in an attempt to thwart Colter's candidacy, Moeur withdrew from the race, asking his supporters to throw their support behind Osborn. Shortly thereafter, also in August, Cobb also withdrew from the race. In late August, on his way to a campaign stop, the car in which Colter was traveling struck a steer on the road between Bisbee and Tombstone. The car was traveling at 40-mile per hour, and Colter was thrown from the vehicle, resulting in severe bruising and a concussion. After a brief stop in Tombstone, the party continued on to Tucson, where Colter remained resting in his hotel room for several days, cancelling campaign stops.

This left only three candidates to run in the Democratic primary: Osborn, Sutter and Colter. On September 10, early returns showed Sutter with a slight lead over Colter. With only 29 of 82 statewide precincts counted, Sutter had 772 votes to Colter's 755, with Osborn a distant third with 71. However. by the time 79 precincts had tallied their votes, Colter had pulled into a commanding lead, with the three final precincts to be counted being small. Colter won the Democratic primary in September 1918, garnering 44% of the total votes, 14,539 to Sutter's 10,108 and Osborn's 8,390. In doing so, he won 12 of Arizona's then 14 counties. After his winning the nomination, his eligibility was questioned due to his involvement in the state legislature in raising the salary of the office of the governor during the prior year. Attempts were made to influence Colter and the state Democratic committee to have Colter withdraw from the race, however those attempts were thwarted.

In late October it was announced that Colter had come down with the flu. He had to curtail his campaign activities and was hospitalized in Phoenix on October 25. Supporters of Colter approached Sutter to request he write a public letter endorsing Colter. Sutter agreed, but with the provision that the letter also include his feelings towards Hunt, which were not favorable. Colter's supporters withdrew their request. A main point of the opposition to Colter's candidacy was lack of denouncing the Industrial Workers of the World (IWW), which might have been due to Hunt's support for the organization. The general election, on November 5, was hotly contested and incredibly close. Two days after the election, both sides were still declaring victory. As counting continued, Campbell pulled into a slight lead of approximately 150 votes by November 9; a lead which had widened to 338 by November 13, although Colter refused to concede. With Campbell holding the slight lead, the results were set to become official on Monday, November 18. However, on the 19th the count was still continuing in Maricopa County. Finally, on November 23 it was announced that Colter had conceded the race to Campbell. While Colter won 9 of the state's 14 counties, he lost by a large margin in Maricopa. The final tally was Campbell 25,927 and Colter 25,588, with the third party socialist candidate, George D. Smith garnering 444 votes. Smith's number of votes was larger than the number of votes by which Campbell won the election. Following his defeat, Colter went back into resting, recuperating from the flu he had come down with in late October.

=== Post election ===
In February 1919 Colter floated the idea of his running again for the governorship of Arizona in 1920, one of several prominent men to throw their hat into the ring. The controversy surrounding Colter's potential eligibility for assuming the role of governor led to a proposal to alter the existing verbiage in the law, so that it allowed existing lawmakers to vote on pay issues of offices they run for in the future, but not for offices which were created by their legislature. However, the rule would not be altered until 1922. Despite earlier reports about his intention to run again for governor, by September 1919 Colter announced that he was out of politics. Said statement appearing in documents which were released in relation to a bond issuance of $250,000 which Colter was preparing to pay off debts he had accumulated during the campaign. However, even after this announcement, he was still considered as a potential candidate. In 1920, he did not seek to remain as the Democratic National Committeeman, and was succeeded by W. L. Barnum.

In November 1922, Colter was once again elected to the state senate, for his third term representing Apache County in Arizona's sixth state legislature. He was considered as one of three front-runners for the speakership of the senate. He would be re-elected in November 1924, for his fourth term, representing Apache County in Arizona's seventh state legislature. In 1926 he was re-elected for a fifth term representing Apache County in Arizona's 8th Legislature. He was elected to the 11th Arizona State Legislature in 1932, this time as a representative in the house, from Apache County. In 1940, he had his last successful campaign, elected to the Arizona House of Representatives, representing Maricopa County from 1941 to 1942. That same election saw his brother Bert elected to the state senate seat from Apache County, which Fred had occupied in the 1910s and 1920s. In 1942, he ran for the last time, unsuccessfully, in the Democratic primary for the U.S. House of Representatives.

== Efforts to control the water of the Colorado River ==
In 1920, Colter began a long effort to control the waters of the Colorado River. He began an effort to put construct a series of dams from southern Utah all the way down to Yuma, Arizona. The dams would store water, which would be used to reclaim over 6,000,000 acres of arid land through irrigation. The proposal was supposed to pay for itself through the sale of the power generated by the dams. In December 1921, the Arizona Fish and Game was formed, with Colter serving on its executive committee. In 1922, under doctor's orders, Colter booked an around-the-world cruise to recover his health. The itinerary of the trip included Hawaii, the Philippines, China, Japan, India and the mid-East. The trip was postponed when Colter learned of the Santa Fe Compact. He returned to Arizona and began a decades long fight to keep the lion's share of the water from the Colorado River for use in Arizona.

In 1923, Colter founded the Arizona Highline Reclamation Association, the goal of which was to create a system of dams and reservoirs in the state, utilizing the waters of the Colorado. The concept also had the support of Colter's long-time political ally, Hunt, who had been re-elected as governor in 1922, defeating the man who had defeated Colter in the 1918 governorship race, Campbell. Early in 1924, Colter announced that he would be challenging incumbent Carl Hayden for his seat in the U.S. House of Representatives. Hayden was a proponent of the Santa Fe Compact, and this was seen as an internal struggle within the Democratic party in Arizona. However, for reasons unknown, Colter later withdraw from the race, although Hayden did tone down his support for the agreement.

Colter coined the phrase, "Save the Colorado for Arizona", and he was the main reason that Arizona refused to sign the agreement as long as he was alive. He was compared as Arizona's counterpart to California's William Mulholland, as well as comparisons to Abraham Lincoln and Thomas Jefferson for his stance on Arizonians' rights to the water. Colter dedicated most of his efforts of the last two decades of his life to establishing the highline canal, committing not only his time, but the large fortune he had accumulated during the 1900s and 1910s. While ultimately unsuccessful in preventing the Santa Fe Compact from being signed by Arizona, the work of Colter, and his vision of a system of dams and canals to irrigate the arid regions of Arizona, would later form the basis for the Central Arizona Project of the 1960s and 1970s.

== Ranching/farming/mining activities ==
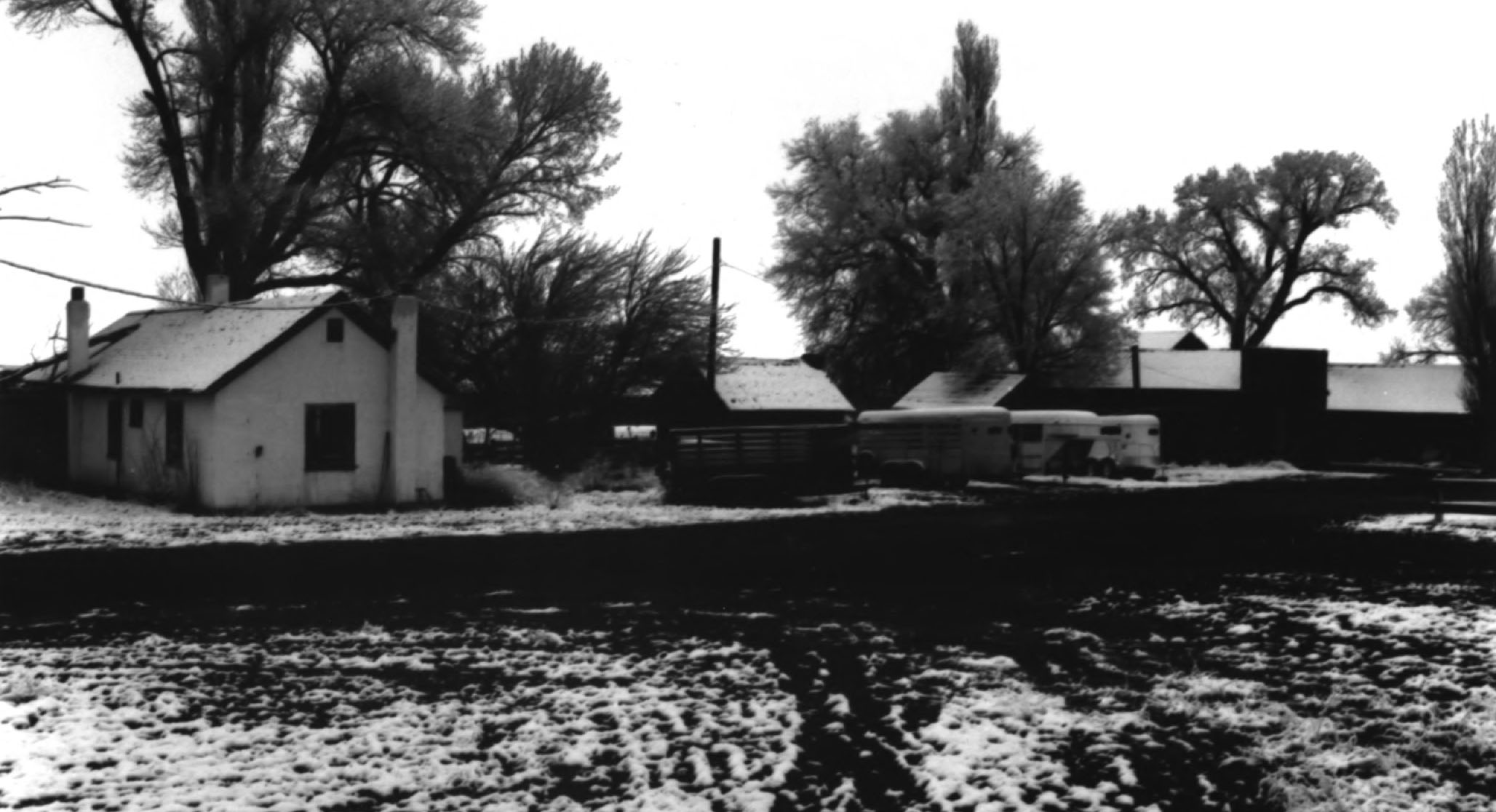
Blacksmith shop, bunkhouse, log cabin, shed, and commissary on the Colter Ranch

Colter, by the time he was 21 had created his own brand, the "Cross Bar". With his marriage to Duge in 1904, the homestead became known as the Colter Ranch. He brought an unknown number of his own cattle to the ranch, in addition to taking control of the 1100 head which were in Duge's herd, as well as over 800 he also managed for Elizabeth. By 1906 he had increased the herd to over 12,000 animals. Two years later, he had developed four reservoirs in the area: Colter, Mexican Hay Lake, Pool Corral, and Hog Wallow. He had also purchased another 3,500 acres extending the homestead's range, as well as up on the mesa to grow alfalfa feed. Mexican Hay Lake is still a popular fishing spot to this day.

By the end of 1915, it was reported that several gold mining ventures to which he was a partner were beginning to bear fruit. These included two placer strikes on or near the White River in Tulare County. Ironically, one of the mining projects, that in which he partnered with John Marshall along the White River, was halted when local ranchers and farmers protested the plan to use the water from the river other than during flood stage.

In addition to his large cattle herds, Colter also had extensive sheep flocks as well. By 1916, he held a large flock which grazed in Apache County during the summer months, and moved into Maricopa County, underneath the Roosevelt Dam during the winter months, where Colter had purchased extensive acreage to pasture his animals. The commissary he set up on the Colter Ranch was not only to serve the numerous ranch hands which worked his herds and flocks, but also served the surrounding ranches as well, becoming quite successful. By the end of 1917 the Colter Ranch, also known as the Cross Bar Ranch, after his brand, had grown into one of the largest in the state of Arizona.

In 1919, Colter issued first mortgage bonds for $250,000, using 16,135 acres of his ranch as collateral, including 7,500 acres which were cultivated and irrigated, in order to pay off debts he had accumulated during his campaign for the governorship, as well as to provide him with extra funds to use on the ranch. At the time the acreage was appraised at $640,000. In October 1919, Colter sold a five-year lease for oil and gas exploration and development on his patented lands in the Holbrook oil fields in Apache County.

Leaving his brother Bert to oversee his ranching concerns, Colter moved to Los Angeles in 1920, to bolster his weakening financial position, he founded the Northern Arizona Land Company, and increased the mortgage on his properties to $450,000 through a bond issuance. With his return to Arizona politics in 1922, Colter once again began splitting his time between Phoenix and his ranch in Round Valley. However, downward turns in the price of grain and beef left him in a sinking financial position. By 1924, creditors had already begun to foreclose on pieces of his large holdings. Combined with his continued financial commitment to the Highline Canal, he continued to lose more and more of the ranch, and by 1934, the entire property was owned by creditors, and Colter moved permanently to Phoenix. By 1944 Colter had lost all his money. On January 8, 1944, he was hit by a car in Phoenix, killing him.

Party political offices
Preceded by George W. P. Hunt	Democratic nominee for Governor of Arizona; 1918	Succeeded by Mit Simms
