= Black River (Arizona) =

Waterway in Arizona, United States

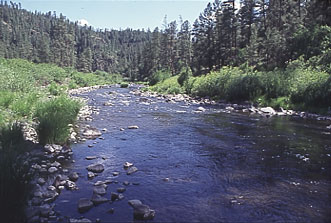
- Black River

- Location of the mouth of the Black River in Arizona

Location
- Country: United States
- State: Arizona
- County: Apache, Graham, Navajo, Gila, Greenlee

Physical characteristics
- Source: near Alpine
  - location: Apache-Sitgreaves National Forest, Greenlee County
  - coordinates: 33°45′03″N 109°21′46″W
  - elevation: 7,480 ft (2,280 m)
- Mouth: Salt River
  - location: Confluence with White River, Gila County
  - coordinates: 33°44′20″N 110°13′32″W
  - elevation: 4,222 ft (1,287 m)
- Length: 114 mi (183 km)
- Basin size: 1,314 sq mi (3,400 km^{2})
- Discharge
  - location: mouth (average) and a gauge 5 miles (8 km) upstream for maximum and minimum
  - average: 420 cu ft/s (12 m^{3}/s)
  - minimum: 11 cu ft/s (0.31 m^{3}/s)
  - maximum: 54,700 cu ft/s (1,550 m^{3}/s)

The Black River is a 114-mile-long (183 km) river in the White Mountains of the U.S. state of Arizona. It forms south of the town of Greer and west of the towns of Nutrioso and Alpine. The river flows southwest then northwest to meet the White River west of Fort Apache. The merged streams form the Salt River, a major tributary of the Gila River. Both the Salt and Gila rivers supply water to the Phoenix metro area as well as provides water for farmland and crops around the valley.

James Ohio Pattie named the river in 1826 as he explored this area in Arizona's White Mountains.

== Course ==
From source to mouth, the river flows through Apache, Greenlee, Graham, Navajo and Gila counties. It forms a boundary between Apache and Greenlee counties, then between Apache and Graham counties, and further downstream, between Graham and Navajo counties.

Along its lower reaches, the Black River is the boundary between the Fort Apache Indian Reservation on the north and the San Carlos Indian Reservation on the south. The river also passes near the Bear Wallow Wilderness, through which flows one of the river's tributaries, Bear Wallow Creek.

Some of the places along the lower river are difficult to reach. Many of the roads in the area are unpaved and unmarked on major maps. The "Black River AZ Map" and "Lower Black River guide book" show more details. Bear encounters are possible along this river. Indian route 9 crosses the river at Black River Crossing.

== Flora and fauna ==
Rainbow and brown trout and smallmouth bass are among the 13 species of fish found in the Black River. Major fishes in this river system also include channel catfish, desert suckers, and fathead minnows, among others. Anodonta californiensis and Anodonta have been found on the north fork at Crosby Crossing.

The East Fork Black River and West Fork Black River, which merge to form the mainstem, have populations of brown trout and Apache trout. The headwaters tributaries support many aquatic insects, including more than 30 species of caddisflies. Some of the state's best sports fisheries are found in the Black River watershed. Special permits are required to fish on either reservation.

Plants in the riparian zones include several kinds of willows and cottonwoods, as well as alders and saltcedar. Beaver, muskrats, great blue herons, mallards, and osprey are among the vertebrates found in or near the river.

== See also ==
- List of rivers of Arizona

== Works cited ==
- Benke, Arthur C., ed., and Cushing, Colbert E., ed.; Blinn, Dean W. and Poff, N. Leroy (2005). "Chapter 11: Colorado River Basin" in Rivers of North America. Burlington, Massachusetts: Elsevier Academic Press. ISBN 0-12-088253-1. OCLC 59003378.
