= 1918 Arizona gubernatorial election =

- November 4, 1918
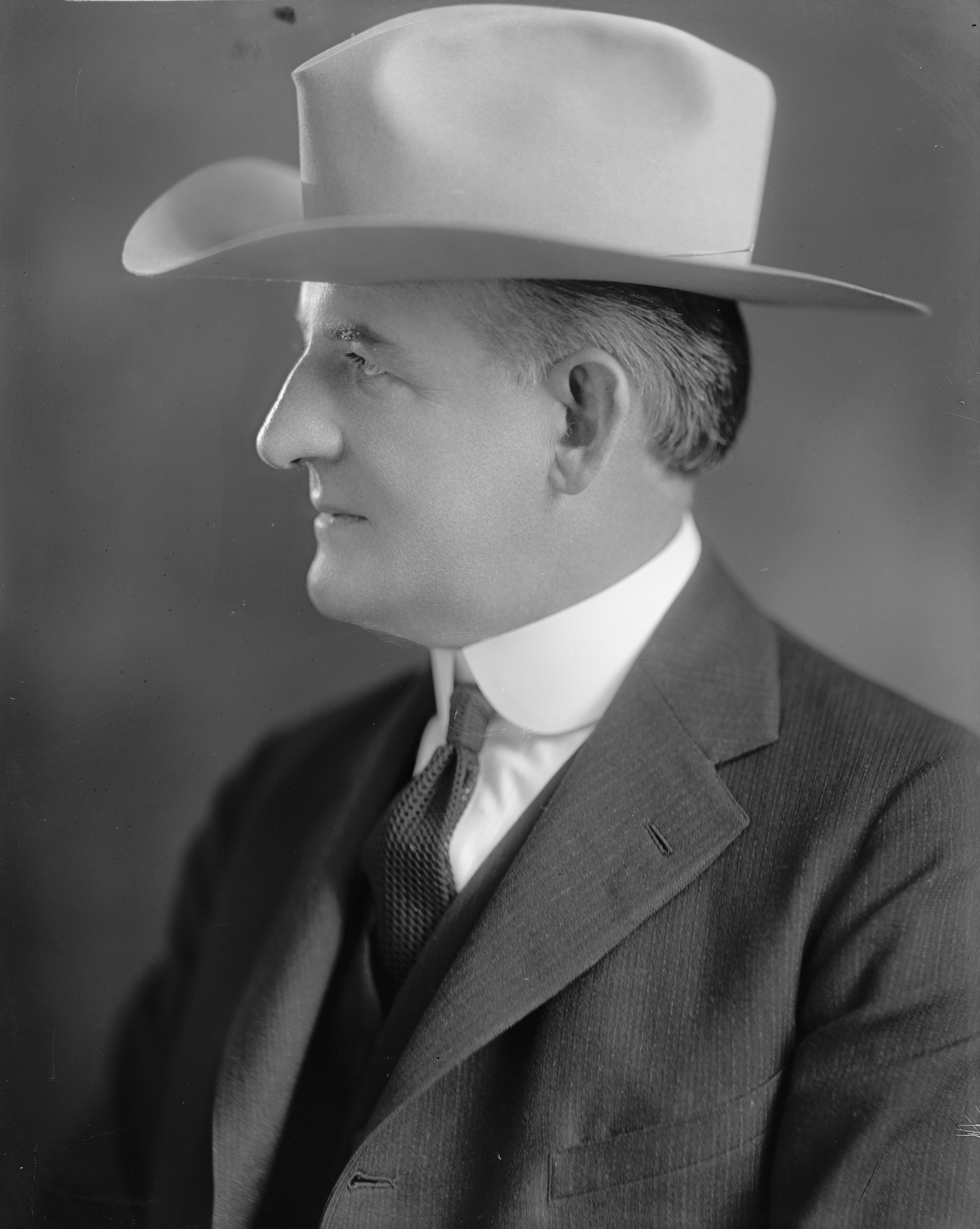

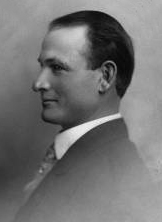
| Nominee | Thomas E. Campbell | Fred T. Colter |
| Party | Republican | Democratic |
| Popular vote | 25,927 | 25,588 |
| Percentage | 49.90% | 49.25% |
- County results Campbell: 40–50% 50–60% 60–70% Colter: 50–60% 60–70%
Governor before election
George W. P. Hunt
Democratic
Elected Governor
Thomas E. Campbell
Republican

The 1918 Arizona gubernatorial election took place on November 5, 1918, for the post of the Governor of Arizona. Thomas Campbell, who served a partial term in 1917 and had his election overturned by the Supreme Court of Arizona, returned to contest the Governors office. Incumbent Governor Hunt declined to run again after the stress of the close elections and the year-long court battle. Despite falling to its lowest percentage in years, the sole third party challenger held the difference between the two candidates. The Democratic challenger was state senator Fred T. Colter, a pro-Hunt Democrat.

Thomas Campbell was sworn in for his first full term on January 6, 1919.

== Democratic primary ==
=== Candidates ===
- Fred Tuttle Colter, State Senator, member of the 1910 Arizona Constitutional Convention.
- Fred Sutter, State Senator. Only primary candidate that earned the hostility of Governor George Hunt.
- Sidney Preston Osborn, incumbent Secretary of State, future Governor.

=== Race ===
In early 1918, Sutter, who was one of two sitting State Senators from Cochise County, was approached by leaders of the Democratic party to consider running in the Democratic primary for the governorship. In February, the other sitting senator from Cochise, C. M. Roberts, announced his intention to run for the Democratic nod for Governor. Sid Osborne also announced his attention to seek the Democratic nomination in February, as did Fred Colter, the state senator from Apache County. Benjamin Baker Moeur announced his intention to run for the Democratic nomination in mid-February. On July 20, 1918, the last day to do so, Colter officially entered the gubernatorial race when he filed his petition with the Arizona Secretary of State. On the final day, Lamar Cobb added his name to the list of Democratic primary candidates, bringing the total to five. In mid-August, in an effort to consolidate the conservative arm of the Democratic party in an attempt to thwart Colter's candidacy, Moeur withdrew from the race, asking his supporters to throw their support behind Osborn. Shortly thereafter, also in August, Cobb also withdrew from the race.

This left only three candidates to run in the Democratic primary: Osborn, Sutter and Colter. On September 10, early returns showed Sutter with a slight lead over Colter. With only 29 of 82 statewide precincts counted, Sutter had 772 votes to Colter's 755, with Osborn a distant third with 71. However. by the time 79 precincts had tallied their votes, Colter had pulled into a commanding lead, with the three final precincts to be counted being small. Colter won the Democratic primary in September 1918, garnering 44% of the total votes, 14,539 to Sutter's 10,108 and Osborn's 8,390. In doing so, he won 12 of Arizona's then 14 counties. It was felt that Osborn and Sutter split the anti-Hunt vote, which allowed Colter to win the nomination.

=== Results ===
Democratic primary results
| Party | Candidate | Votes | % |
|---|---|---|---|
| Democratic | Fred T. Colter | 14,539 | 44.01% |
| Democratic | Fred Sutter | 10,108 | 30.60% |
| Democratic | Sidney P. Osborn | 8,390 | 25.40% |
| Total votes | | 33,037 | 100.00% |

== General election ==
=== Results ===
Arizona gubernatorial election, 1918
| Party | Candidate | Votes | % | ±% |
|---|---|---|---|---|
| Republican | Thomas E. Campbell | 25,927 | 49.90% | +1.96% |
| Democratic | Fred T. Colter | 25,588 | 49.25% | +1.24% |
| Socialist | George D. Smith | 444 | 0.85% | −2.53% |
| Majority | | 339 | 0.65% | |
| Total votes | | 51,959 | 100.00% | |
| Republican gain from Democratic | | Swing | +0.72% | |

=== Results by county ===
| County | Thomas E. Campbell Republican | | Fred T. Colter Democratic | | George D. Smith Socialist | | Margin | | Total votes cast |
| County | # | % | # | % | # | % | # | % | Total votes cast |
|---|---|---|---|---|---|---|---|---|---|
| Apache | 409 | 43.65% | 528 | 56.35% | 0 | 0.00% | -119 | -12.70% | 937 |
| Cochise | 4,110 | 45.34% | 4,898 | 54.03% | 57 | 0.63% | -788 | -8.69% | 9,065 |
| Coconino | 935 | 51.29% | 867 | 47.56% | 21 | 1.15% | 68 | 3.73% | 1,823 |
| Gila | 2,117 | 42.20% | 2,876 | 57.33% | 24 | 0.48% | -759 | -15.13% | 5,017 |
| Graham | 822 | 39.42% | 1,252 | 60.05% | 11 | 0.53% | -430 | -20.62% | 2,085 |
| Greenlee | 786 | 40.10% | 1,159 | 59.13% | 15 | 0.77% | -373 | -19.03% | 1,960 |
| Maricopa | 7,779 | 60.33% | 4,977 | 38.60% | 138 | 1.07% | 2,802 | 21.73% | 12,894 |
| Mohave | 527 | 36.22% | 899 | 61.79% | 29 | 1.99% | -372 | -25.57% | 1,455 |
| Navajo | 780 | 48.66% | 812 | 50.66% | 11 | 0.69% | -32 | -2.00% | 1,603 |
| Pima | 2,465 | 56.95% | 1,842 | 42.56% | 21 | 0.49% | 623 | 14.39% | 4,328 |
| Pinal | 1,169 | 51.79% | 1,079 | 47.81% | 9 | 0.40% | 90 | 3.99% | 2,257 |
| Santa Cruz | 609 | 46.95% | 683 | 52.66% | 5 | 0.39% | -74 | -5.71% | 1,297 |
| Yavapai | 2,615 | 49.67% | 2,590 | 49.19% | 60 | 1.14% | 25 | 0.47% | 5,265 |
| Yuma | 804 | 40.75% | 1,126 | 57.07% | 43 | 2.18% | -322 | -16.32% | 1,973 |
| Totals | 25,927 | 49.90% | 25,588 | 49.25% | 444 | 0.85% | 339 | 0.65% | 51,959 |

==== Counties that flipped from Republican to Democratic ====
- Graham
- Navajo

== Bibliography ==
- Goff, John S. (1973). "Creation of the State of Arizona". George W. P. Hunt and his Arizona. Phoenix: Socio-Technical Publications. pp. 121–122.
