= Mora National Fish Hatchery and Technology Center =

Coordinates: 36°01′39″N 105°16′36″W

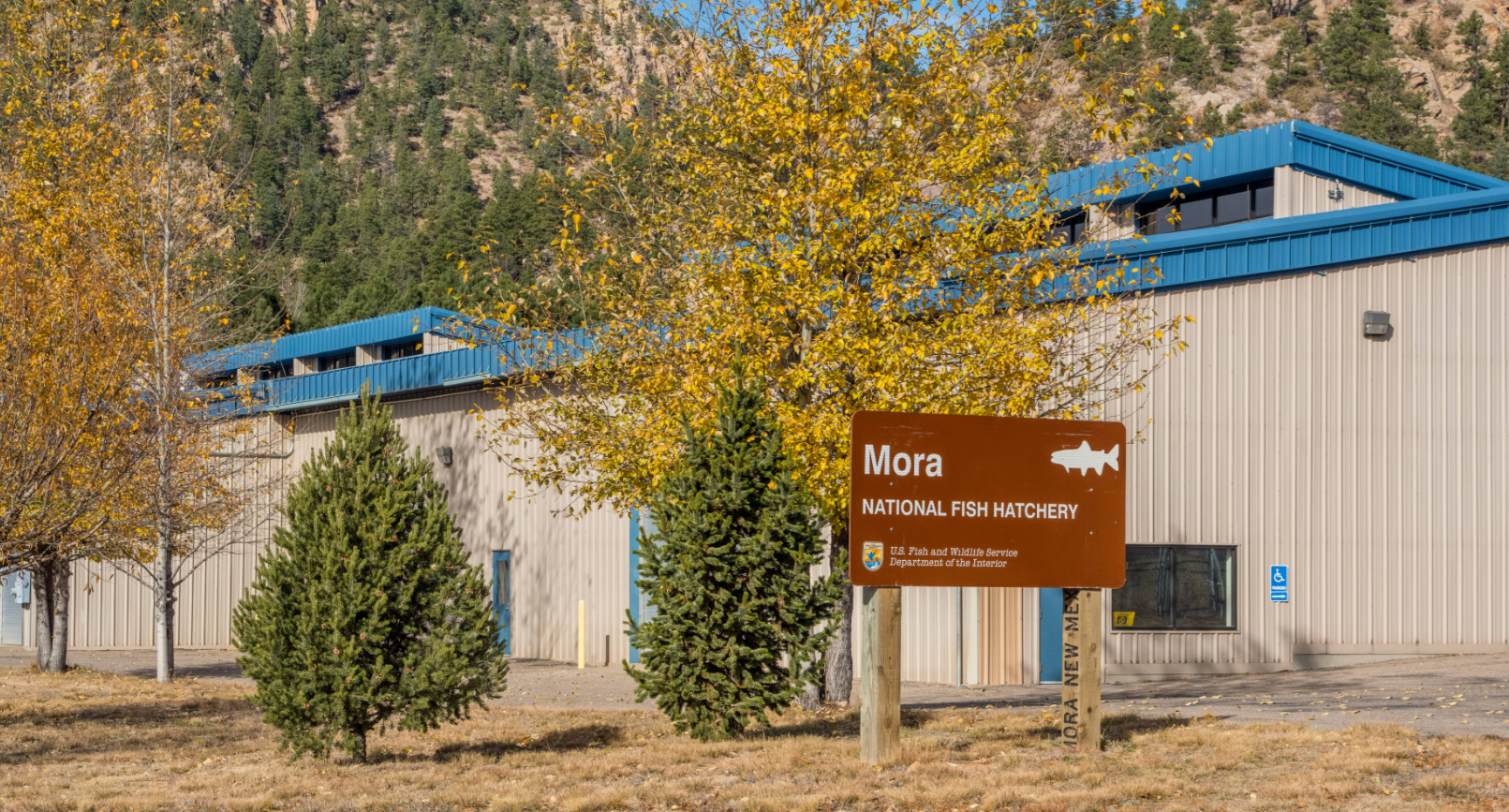
The Mora National Fish Hatchery and Technology Center building in Mora County, New Mexico.

The Mora National Fish Hatchery and Technology Center is one of seven United States Government fish hatchery technology centers in the United States. Located in Mora County, New Mexico, on State Route 434 (milepost 1.5),

The hatchery plays a key role in the restoration and recovery efforts for the threatened Gila trout (Oncorhynchus gilae), a fish found only in the upper headwaters of the Gila River in New Mexico and Arizona. The Mora hatchery keep brood stocks of the Gila trout, maintaining them in as natural a setting as possible. They keep the Gila trout in tanks with woody cover, current flow, and with other fishes they naturally associate with in the wild, like the desert sucker (Pantosteus clarkii) and Sonora (or Gila) sucker (Catostomus insignis). The hatchery intends culturing fish in as natural an environment as possible to maintain wild characteristics in the fish so that the offspring are well-suited to face the rigors of the wild.

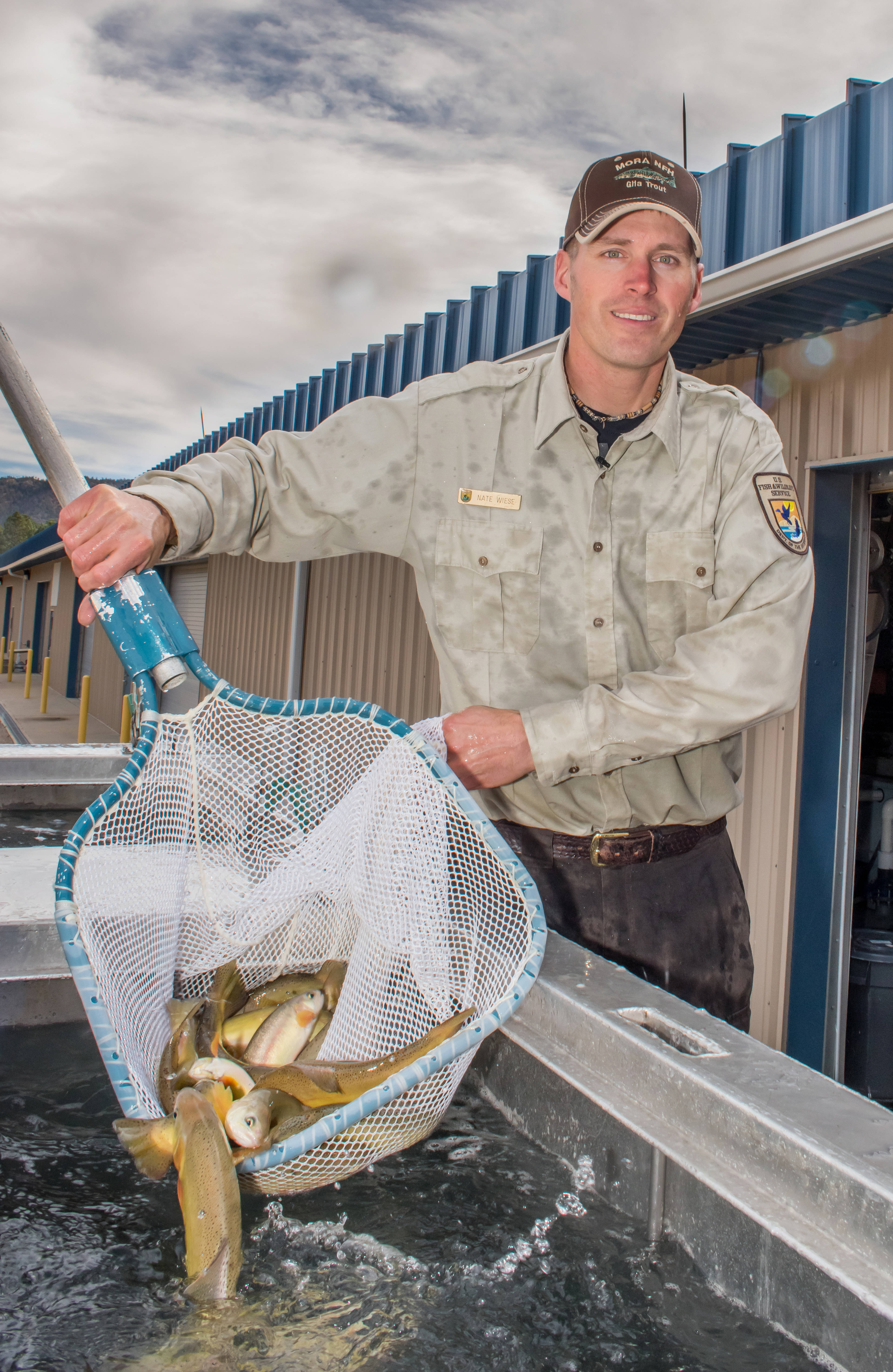
Gila trout loaded for transportation at Mora National Fish Hatchery

Formal cooperative agreements between the United States Fish and Wildlife Service and the New Mexico Department of Game and Fish call for the Mora hatchery also to establish a brood stock of Rio Grande cutthroat trout (Oncorhynchus virginalis virginalis) and provide fish culture training to other biologists. The Mora hatchery also works to conserve the bonytail chub (Gila elegans). The hatchery accepts a limited number of volunteers to assist in conservation activities.

The hatchery uses elaborate quarantine procedures to prevent the spread of disease to the brood stocks from fish brought in from the wild and from other hatcheries. Of particular concern is whirling disease. In 2000, the Mora fish hatchery installed an award-winning, leading-edge water recirculation system that allows it to recirculate up to 95 percent of its water.
