= White River (Arizona) =

River in the United States of America

- Location of the mouth of the White River in Arizona

Location
- Country: United States
- State: Arizona
- County: Navajo County, Gila County

Physical characteristics
- Source: Confluence of White River's east and west forks
  - location: Fort Apache, Navajo County
  - coordinates: 33°47′29″N 109°59′43″W
  - elevation: 4,918 ft (1,499 m)
- Mouth: Salt River
  - location: Confluence with Black River, Gila County
  - coordinates: 33°44′20″N 110°13′32″W
  - elevation: 4,222 ft (1,287 m)
- Length: 16 mi (26 km)
- Basin size: 632 sq mi (1,640 km^{2})
- Discharge
  - location: 4.5 miles (7.2 km) from the mouth
  - average: 188 cu ft/s (5.3 m^{3}/s)
  - minimum: 0 cu ft/s (0 m^{3}/s)
  - maximum: 23,700 cu ft/s (670 m^{3}/s)

The White River is a 16-mile (26 km) tributary of the Salt River in the U.S. state of Arizona. Formed by two forks that drain part of the White Mountains, it begins in Navajo County and ends in Gila County, where it meets the Black River to form the Salt River.

The White River lies entirely within the Fort Apache Indian Reservation in the east-central part of the state. The North Fork White River and the East Fork White River merge near Fort Apache to form the main stem, which continues generally southwest to its confluence with the Black River.

The North Fork is 46 miles (74 km) long, and the East Fork is 26 miles (42 km) long. Originating near the Mogollon Rim, the North Fork flows generally west through Apache County to near McNary and then south through Navajo County to near Fort Apache. The East Fork flows generally west from near Mount Baldy in Apache County to the confluence with the North Fork near Fort Apache.

According to Arizona Place Names, the river and its forks take their name from the White Mountains, "as nearly as can be determined". The origin of the name of the mountains is "probably lost", but "White Mountains" was used by the state's governor in a speech in 1871. An earlier Spanish-language alternative name for the stream was Sierra Blanca River.

== See also ==
- List of rivers of Arizona
