= OdySea Aquarium =

Marine aquarium in Scottsdale, Arizona

- OdySea Aquarium Logo

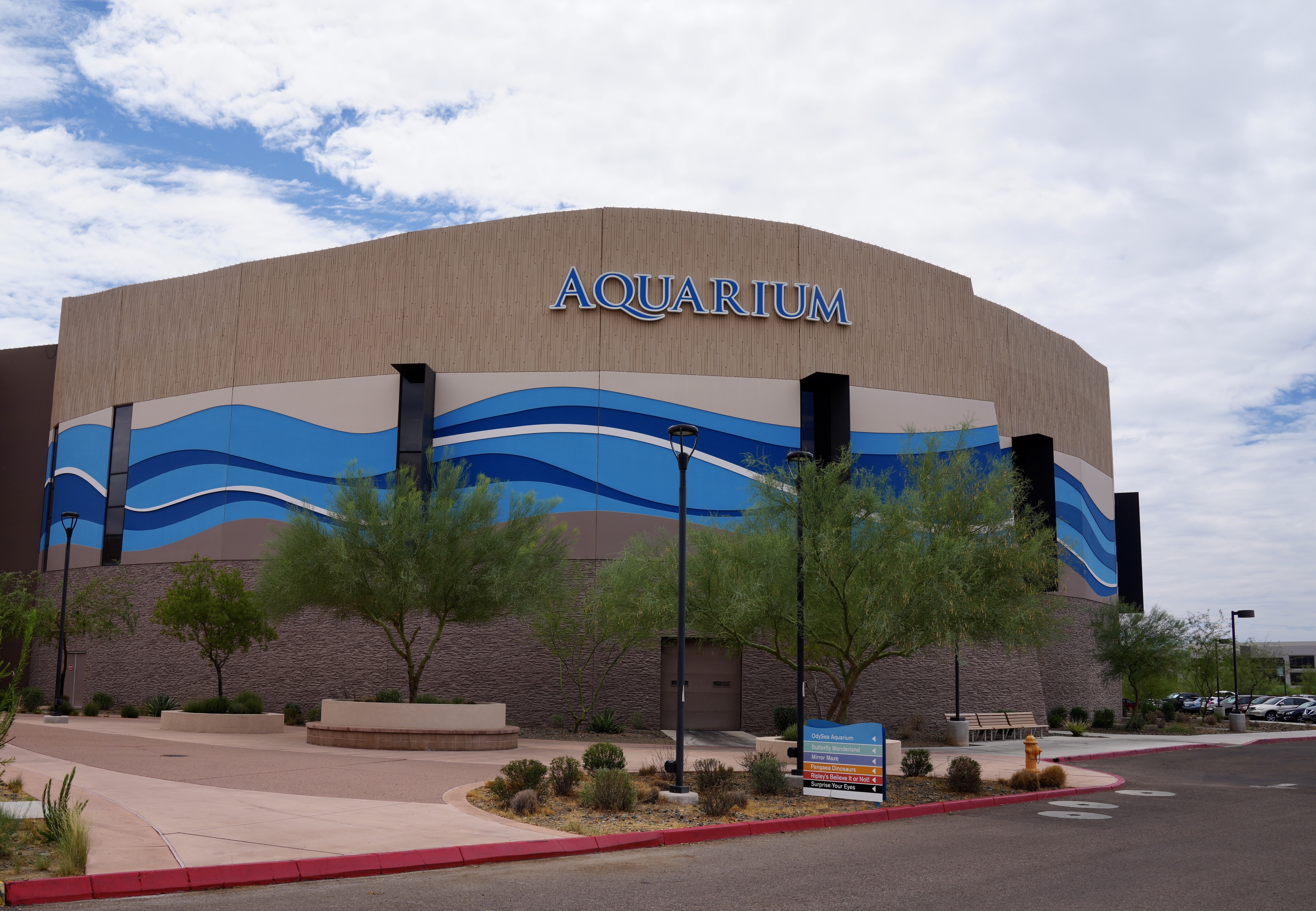
- OdySea Aquarium
- Interactive map of OdySea Aquarium
- 33°33′17″N 111°52′40″W
- Date opened: July 2016
- Location: Scottsdale, Arizona
- Land area: 200,000 square feet (19,000 m^{2})
- No. of animals: 6,000
- No. of species: 370
- Total volume of tanks: 2,000,000 US gallons (7,600,000 L; 1,700,000 imp gal)
- Public transit: Hayden/McClintock (RT 81) to N Pima Rd FS E Via De Ventura (Stop ID 14166); Walk 1.3km (0.8 mi) east
- Website: www.odyseaaquarium.com

OdySea Aquarium in the Salt River Pima-Maricopa Indian Community in Scottsdale, Arizona, is a marine aquarium, and the largest aquarium in the Southwest United States. It opened on September 3, 2016. It holds more than 2,000,000 US gallons (7,600,000 L; 1,700,000 imp gal) of water and spans over 200,000 square feet (19,000 m^{2}). There are over 6,000 animals and 370 different species in over 65 exhibits.

== Attractions ==
OdySea Aquarium is accredited by the Association of Zoos and Aquariums and meets the gold standards of animal care. Attractions include:

- A multi-level facility
- More than 65 exhibits
- 370 species
- 6,000 animals
- A touch pool featuring the world's only Russian sturgeon touch exhibit
- Two Stingray touch exhibits
- A tide touch pool
- Voyager, where guests take their seats in a stadium-seating style theatre with 46 ft. viewing windows in the world's only rotating aquarium
- Restrooms with viewing windows into the shark habitat
- Underwater walking
- A "penguin interaction program"
- "Shark behind the scenes" tours
- walk-about animal ambassadors
- Question and answer sessions
- Occasional mermaid shows and seasonal underwater Santa appearances

== Gallery ==
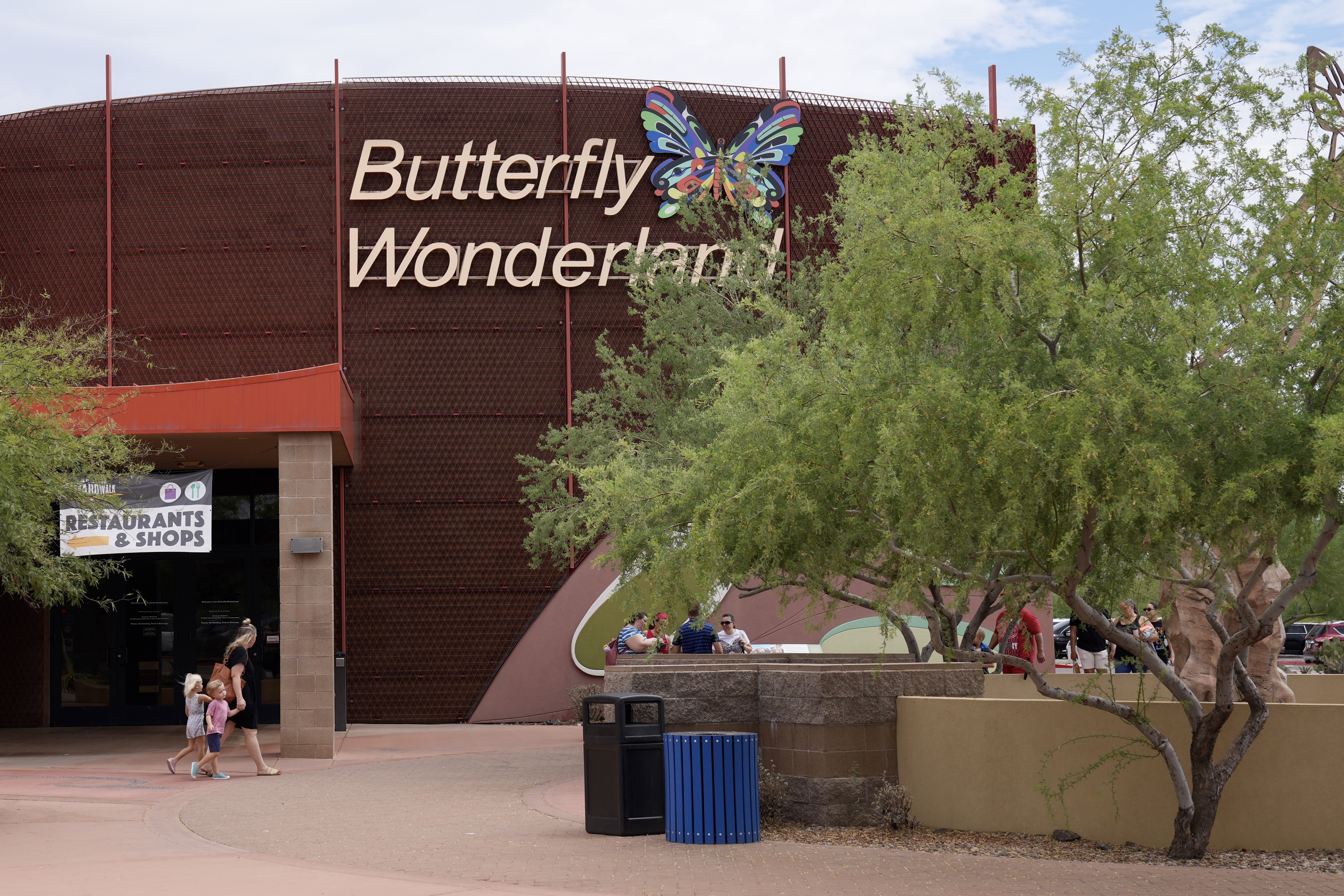
The Butterfly Wonderland is next to the OdySea Aquarium

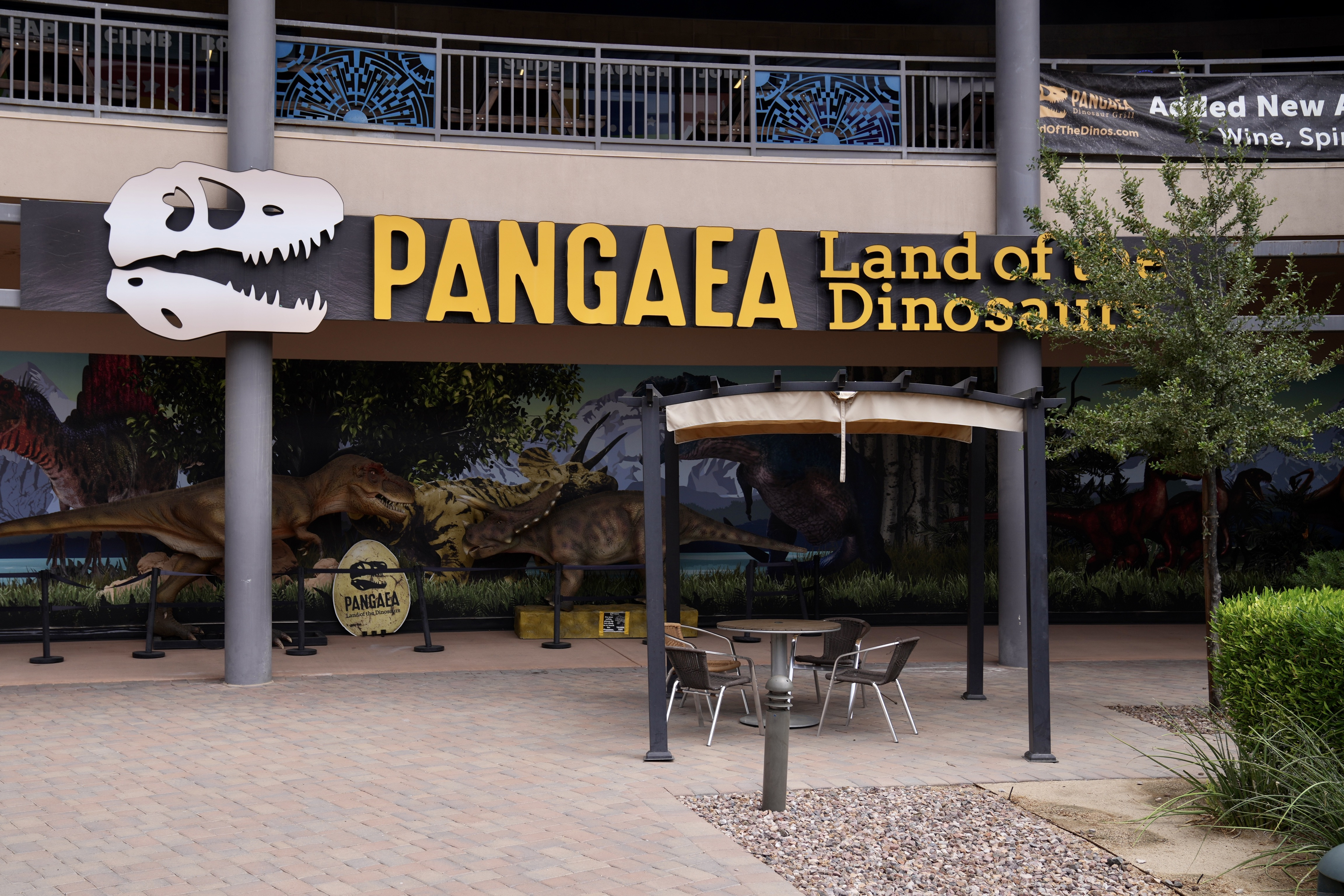
Pangaea Land of the Dinosaurs is close to the OdySea Aquarium
