= Colter Ranch Historic District =

Historic district in Arizona, United States

- U.S. National Register of Historic Places
- U.S. Historic district
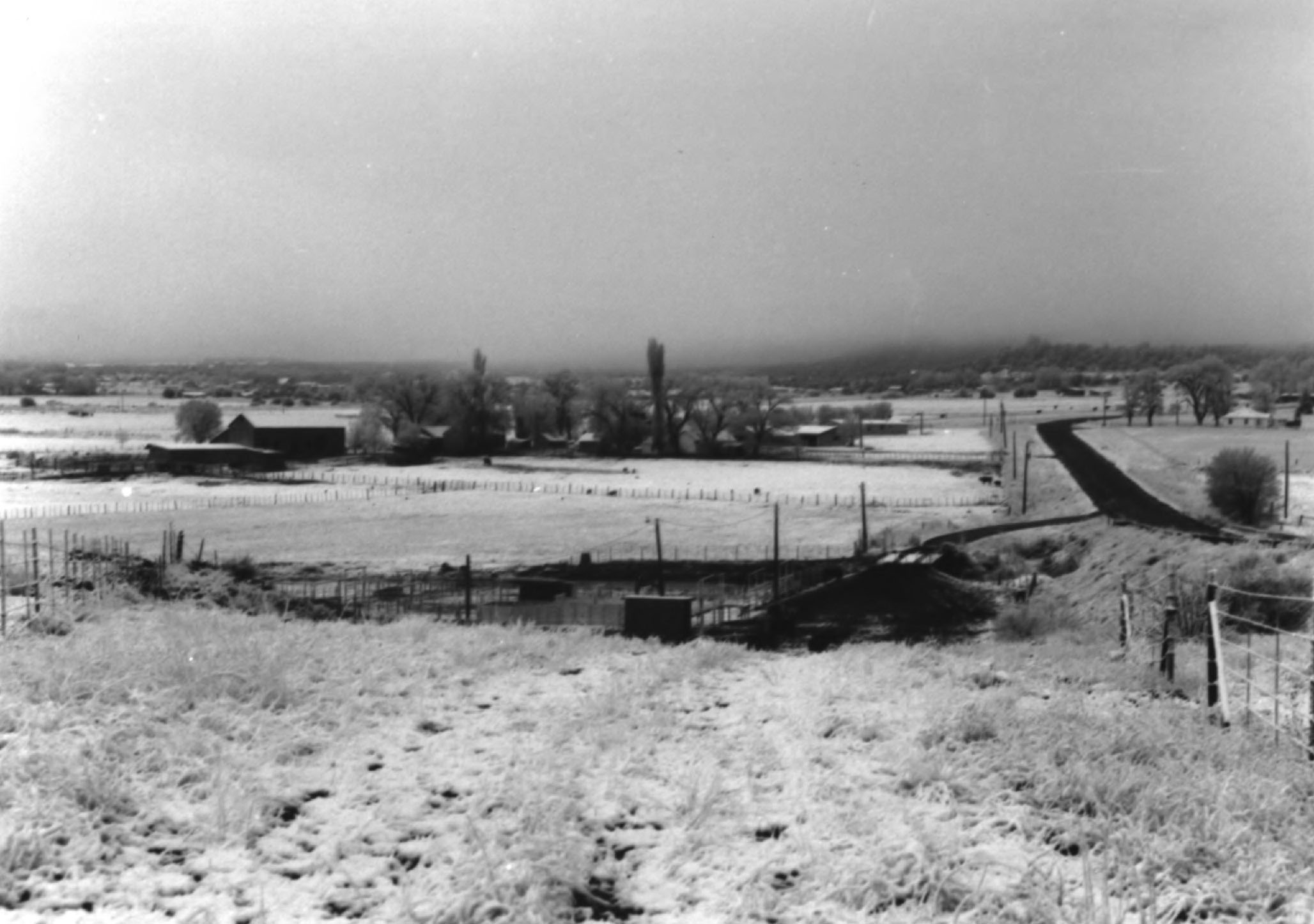
- Overview of the district

- Location within Arizona Location within the United States
- Nearest city: Eagar, Arizona
- Coordinates: 34°06′33″N 109°19′32″W
- Area: 73 acres (30 ha)
- Built by: Phelps, Micajah H.; Colter, Fred T.
- Architectural style: Vernacular, Folk
- NRHP reference No.: 93000626
- Added to NRHP: July 9, 1993

The Colter Ranch Historic District consists of twelve buildings in a rural setting near Eagar, Arizona. The site is located in the Amity Valley, which itself is part of Round Valley (not to be confused with the Census Designated Place in Arizona of the same name); the Little Colorado River runs along the one side of the district. Most of the buildings date from between 1904 and 1930, the period during which Fred Colter resided on the residence.

== Description ==
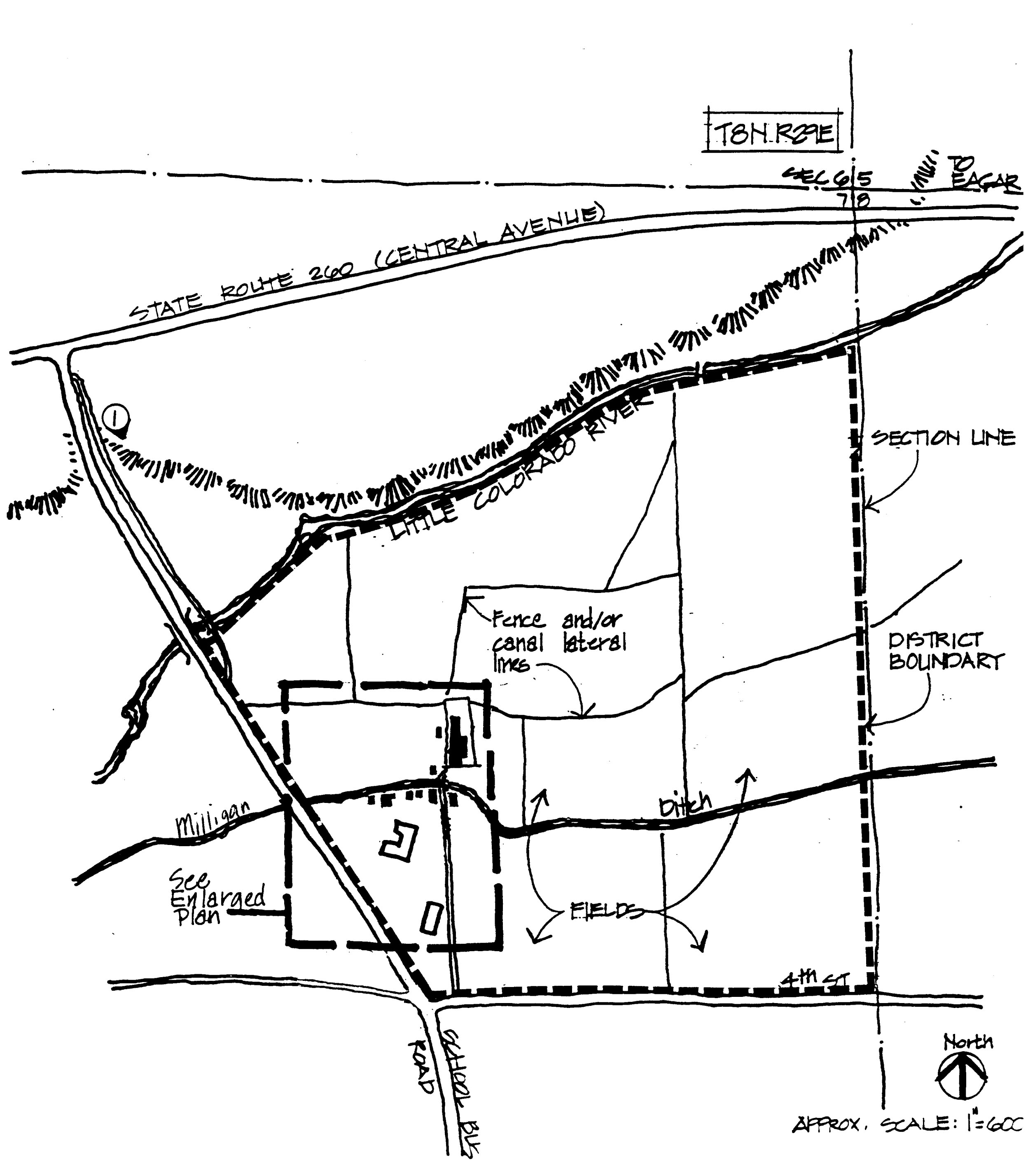
Location of the Colter Ranch Historic District

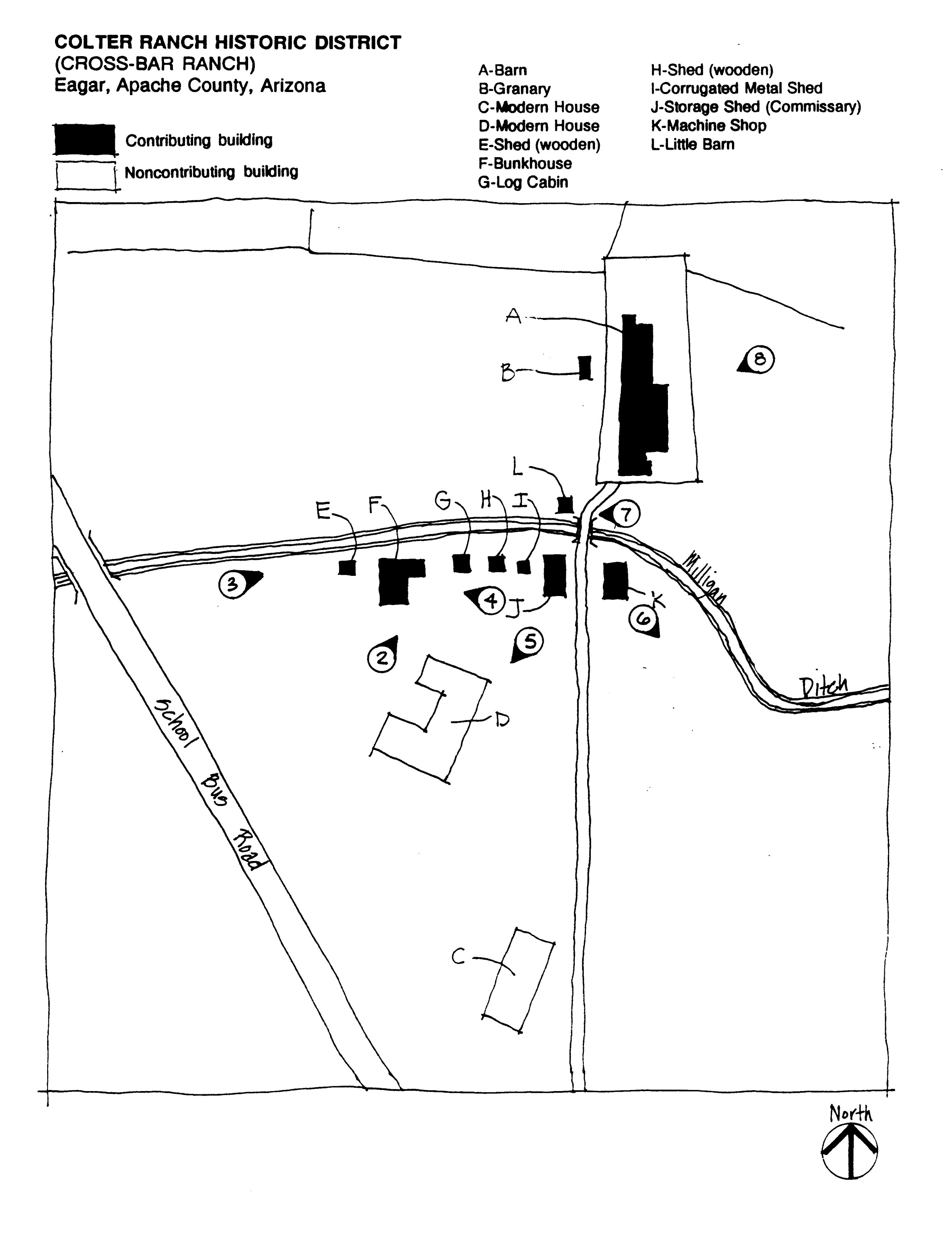
Area plan for the Historic District

Colter Ranch is situated in the portion of Round Valley known as Amity Valley, the valley's name being derived from the Mormon ward which was located here in the 1800s. Eagar and Springerville are the nearest towns. The area is mostly farmland, made possible by irrigation water from the Little Colorado River.

The boundaries of the historic district are the Little Colorado River to the north, 4th Street to the south, and School Bus Road to the west. The boundary on the east is less distinct, lying along a section line on a USGS map (T8N, R29E). The Milligan Ditch, bringing irrigation water from the Little Colorado to the historic ranch bisects the district, running east to west.

Most of the buildings in the district lie on the southern bank of the ditch, towards the western end of the district. These include three sheds (two wooden, and one corrugated metal); a stuccoed log bunkhouse; a log cabin; a corrugated metal shed; a larger wood storage building, which at one point served as the ranch's commissary; and a wooden machine shop. On the northern side of the ditch can be found a barn, a granary, and a work shed (which is also known as the "little barn").

The oldest structure still standing is the log cabin, built ca. 1890. It is a ten by fifteen foot rectangle, the exterior of the building is covered with finished planks, fitted at the corners. The single entrance faces south, away from the Milligan ditch. Its wood-shingled roof is side-gabled with a medium pitch. There is a fireplace on its east side, with a small window on the corresponding west end of the building.

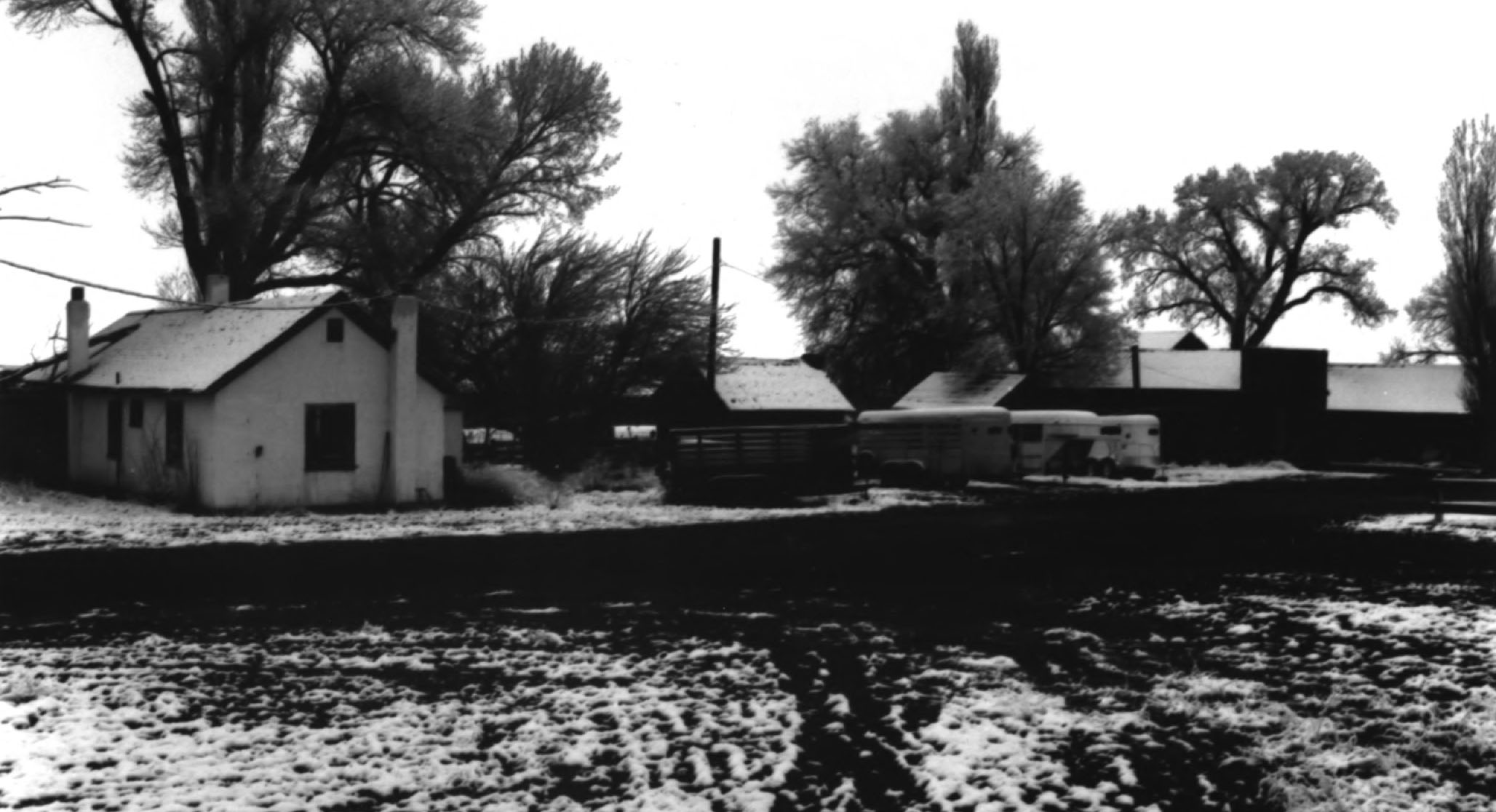
Blacksmith shop, bunkhouse, log cabin, shed, and commissary

The next oldest buildings are the barn, the bunkhouse, the smaller of the wooden sheds, and the storage building (commissary), all of which were constructed circa 1910. The barn is the largest building in the district, measuring 60 feet long by 35 feet wide. Two stories tall, the walls are covered with board-and-batt siding, and has a corrugated metal roof of medium pitch. It has two single-story additions. The northern addition is 60 feet long with a shed roof, while the eastern addition runs the length of the original structure, widening the footprint of the barn by 15 feet. It has a lean-to structure. The entire barn complex is enclosed by a corral, which has a split rail fence approximately 5 feet high. Also within the corral is a 15 by 15 foot granary. Built circa 1940, it is constructed with the same materials as the barn, and has a shed roof.

The bunkhouse has an eastern entrance, and was originally constructed of exposed logs, in the hall-and-parlor style. Two additions were made in the 1930s, giving it its current irregular appearance. The first addition was made to the east side, and consists of a stucco-on-wood-frame construction, while the second was made of concrete to the western side. To the west of the bunkhouse, and the most westernmost of all the structures, is the smallest of the sheds. Approximately 10 feet by 10 feet, it is a single story with an outside surface is covered in vertical wood planking, and it has a corrugated metal roof, with a low-slope.

The commissary measures about 30 feet by 16 feet, and has wood board-and-batten siding. The front of the building has a door centered on the building, flanked by two square windows. The other exterior walls have no openings to the outside. It has a corrugated metal gable roof. There is a false commercial "boomtown roof" on the south side, which hides the corrugated roof from view.

The next buildings were all built in the 1940s. These include the other two sheds. The wooden shed is about ten by fifteen feet, with a gable roof of medium pitch, sheathed in corrugated metal. Its exterior walls are covered in shiplap wood siding. Its single entrance is off centered on the southern side, and has two small windows. Next to this wooden shed is a small corrugated metal shed. Its walls and roof are of corrugated metal, with the roof being shed-style sloping towards the ditch.

The machine shop is a wooden structure with an exterior board-and-batt siding. Approximately 35 by 25 feet, it has a gable roof, facing south, with a corrugated metal surface. The south facing front features a pair of large wooden doors. Across the ditch, on the north side is the "little barn", a small work shed measuring 18 feet by 12 feet. It has a shed roof of corrugated metal, and its walls are unfinished board-and-batt.

There are also two modern homes within the district, built in the 1980s, which do not contribute to the historicity of the site.

== History ==
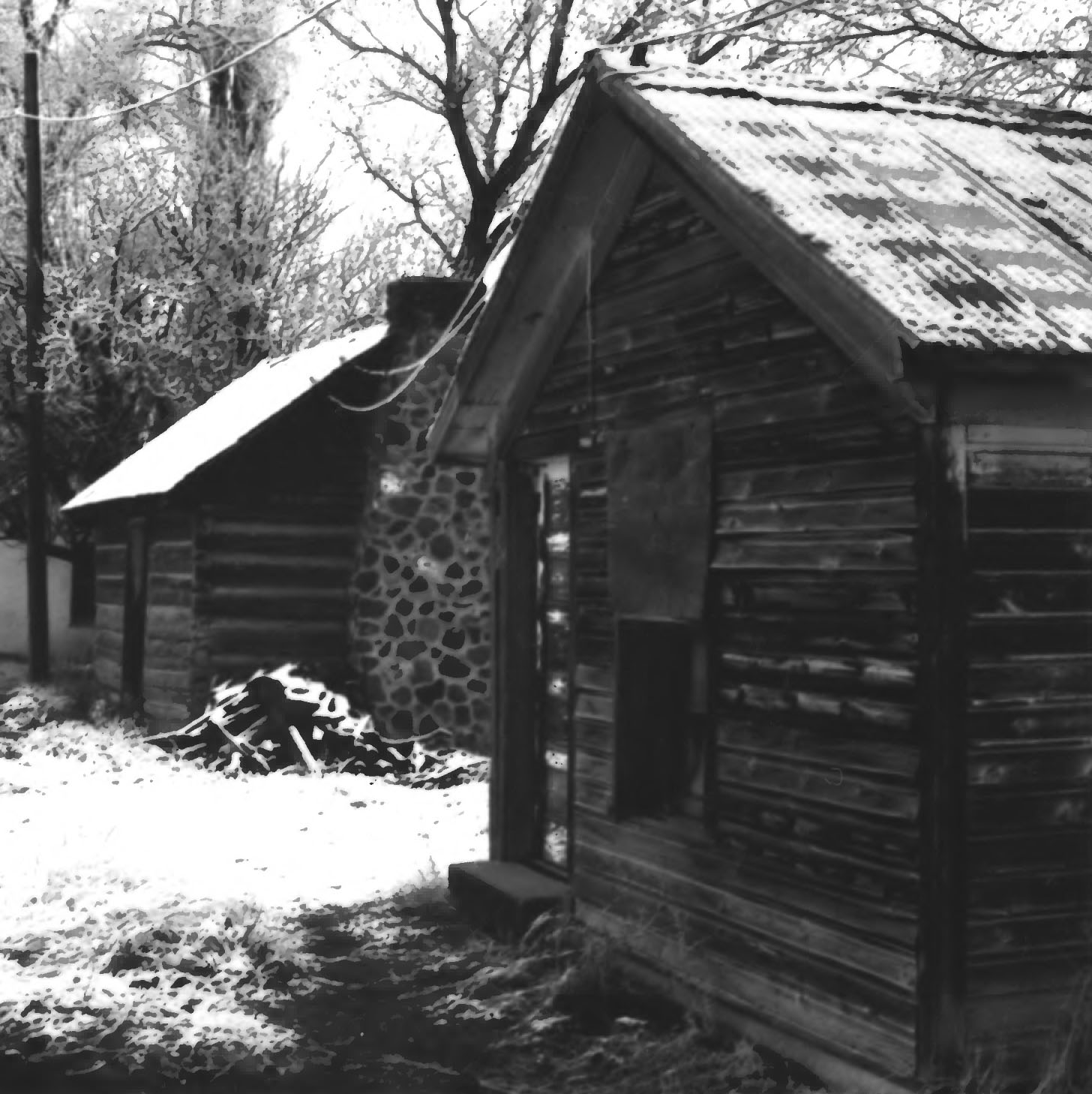
Log cabin and shed

In 1881, Micajah Harris Phelps settled a 160-acre parcel of land straddling the just completed Milligan Ditch. His cattle operation was one of the first large herding operations in Round Valley. When the Amity Ward of the LDS church was created in 1882, Phelps' homestead was located therein. On his death in 1892, his property (which included other ranches in Texas and New Mexico) was split between his three children: Bill Phelps, Sarah Dugan Phelps (known as Duge) and Elizabeth Phelps. Duge maintained the family home in Amity Valley, running a large portion of her father's original herd of 350 cattle.

Bill Phelps enlarged his holdings, and his herd, which had grown to over 1000 head of cattle by the time of his death in 1903. When he died at the age of 51, his one-third share of the Amity Valley property was left to Duge, who then controlled two-thirds of the original homestead. In addition, in order to settle the values of the property distribution of their brothers will, Elizabeth, who had received more valuable property in New Mexico, gave the remaining third of the Amity homestead to Duge. Duge was considered very accomplished and liberated for a woman of that time. She has successfully run her own cattle operation for over ten years by the time she re-consolidated her father's entire homestead. On November 11, 1904, the 40 year-old Duge married the 25 year-old Fred Colter, who had been Bill Phelps' straw boss on Phelps' Apache County operation.

Colter, by the time he was 21 had created his own brand, the "Cross Bar". With his marriage to Duge in 1904, the homestead became known as the Colter Ranch. He brought an unknown number of his own cattle to the ranch, in addition to taking control of the 1100 head which were in Duge's herd, as well as over 800 he also managed for Elizabeth. By 1906 he had increased the herd to over 12,000 animals. Two years later, he had developed four reservoirs in the area: Colter, Mexican Hay Lake, Pool Corral, and Hog Wallow. He had also purchased another 3,500 acres extending the homestead's range, as well as up on the mesa to grow alfalfa feed.

It was during this timeframe that he built the large barn on the property, to store approximately 40 tons of alfalfa to use as feed for his livestock during the winter. He also built a bunkhouse for his growing number of ranch hands, as well as a commissary where they could purchase any necessities. The commissary was also open for any residents of the nearby ranches. In May 1913, Colter applied for and was granted a post office to be run out of his homestead, which would serve also the local ranches. Named the Colter Post Office, Duge became its first only postmistress, and remained open until 1922.

By the end of the 1910s, the ranch operation had reached its peak, containing over 43,000 acres of deeded land, and leased acreage surpassing 200,000. It was one of the largest cattle operations in northern Arizona, and it was the largest combined cattle operation and irrigated farming venture in the state.

After the end of World War I, grain and beef prices fell precipitously. In order to stave off creditors, Colter formed the Northern Arizona Land Company, which issued $450,000 in bonds, using all of the deeded acres as collateral. However, this proved to be only a stopgap measure, and by 1924 creditors began to foreclose on different parcels of property to satisfy the notes. By the early 1930s every piece of land had been foreclosed on. In 1935 the ranch was sold to William A. Spence. The new owner moved the commissary from what is now the intersection of 4th Street and School Bus Road, to its current position. With the wave of mechanized farming taking hold, Spence also constructed the machine shed.

Spence sold 1430 acres of the ranch in 1951 to two partners, Victor L. Udall and Gunnar Thude, which included the Colter Ranch. When Udall died later that year, Thude retained about 900 acres, with Udall's heirs taking the other 500, which included the Colter Ranch District. Thude eventually sold his acreage to Louis Johnson and John Wayne, who added additional territory and created the 26 Bar Hereford Ranch. Johnson and Wayne sold the ranch to Tom Chauncey, who currently owns the property. Sam Udall, Victor's son, continues to own the 500 acres which include the historic district.

== See also ==
- National Register of Historic Places listings in Apache County, Arizona
