= Nutrioso, Arizona =

Census-designated place in Apache County, Arizona, United States

- Census-designated place
- Location of Nutrioso in Apache County, Arizona.

- Location within Arizona Location within the United States
- Coordinates: 33°57′05″N 109°12′22″W
- Country: United States
- State: Arizona
- County: Apache

Area
  - Total: 0.28 sq mi (0.72 km^{2})
  - Land: 0.28 sq mi (0.72 km^{2})
  - Water: 0 sq mi (0.00 km^{2})
- Elevation: 7,697 ft (2,346 m)

Population (2020)
  - Total: 39
  - Density: 139.7/sq mi (53.95/km^{2})
- Time zone: UTC-7 (Mountain (MST))
- ZIP code: 85932
- Area code: 928
- GNIS feature ID: 2582833

Nutrioso is an unincorporated community and census-designated place (CDP) in Apache County, Arizona, United States. Nutrioso is located on U.S. Route 180 and U.S. Route 191, 12 miles (19 km) south-southeast of Eagar. Nutrioso has a post office with ZIP code 85932. As of the 2010 census, the population was 26.

== History ==
Nutrioso's name is derived from the Spanish word Nutria ("Otter"). The early Spanish colonists referred to beaver as "nutria", perhaps because the Eurasian beaver had been extinct in Spain since the 17th century. On August 2, 1776 Francisco Silvestre Vélez de Escalante wrote in his diary, "...we halted in a small plain on the bank of another arroyo which is called Rio de las Nutrias, because, although it is of permanent and running water, apparently during all or most of the year it stands in pools where they say beavers breed." The first settlers in the area either killed an otter and a bear (Oso in Spanish) and took the name from that incident, killed a beaver and a bear and misused the term "Nutria" or killed just a beaver and used the term "Nutrioso" to mean "Of Beavers".

Nutrioso rose in importance as Mormon refugees relocated here after other nearby settlements were attacked by Native American groups. By 1880, a fort had been constructed, and by 1883 a post office was established.

== Demographics ==
Historical population
Census	Pop.	Note	%±
2010	26		—
2020	39		50.0%
U.S. Decennial Census

== See also ==
- List of census-designated places in Arizona
