= Haigler Creek, Arizona =

CDP in Gila County, Arizona

- Census-designated place
- Haigler Creek, Arizona
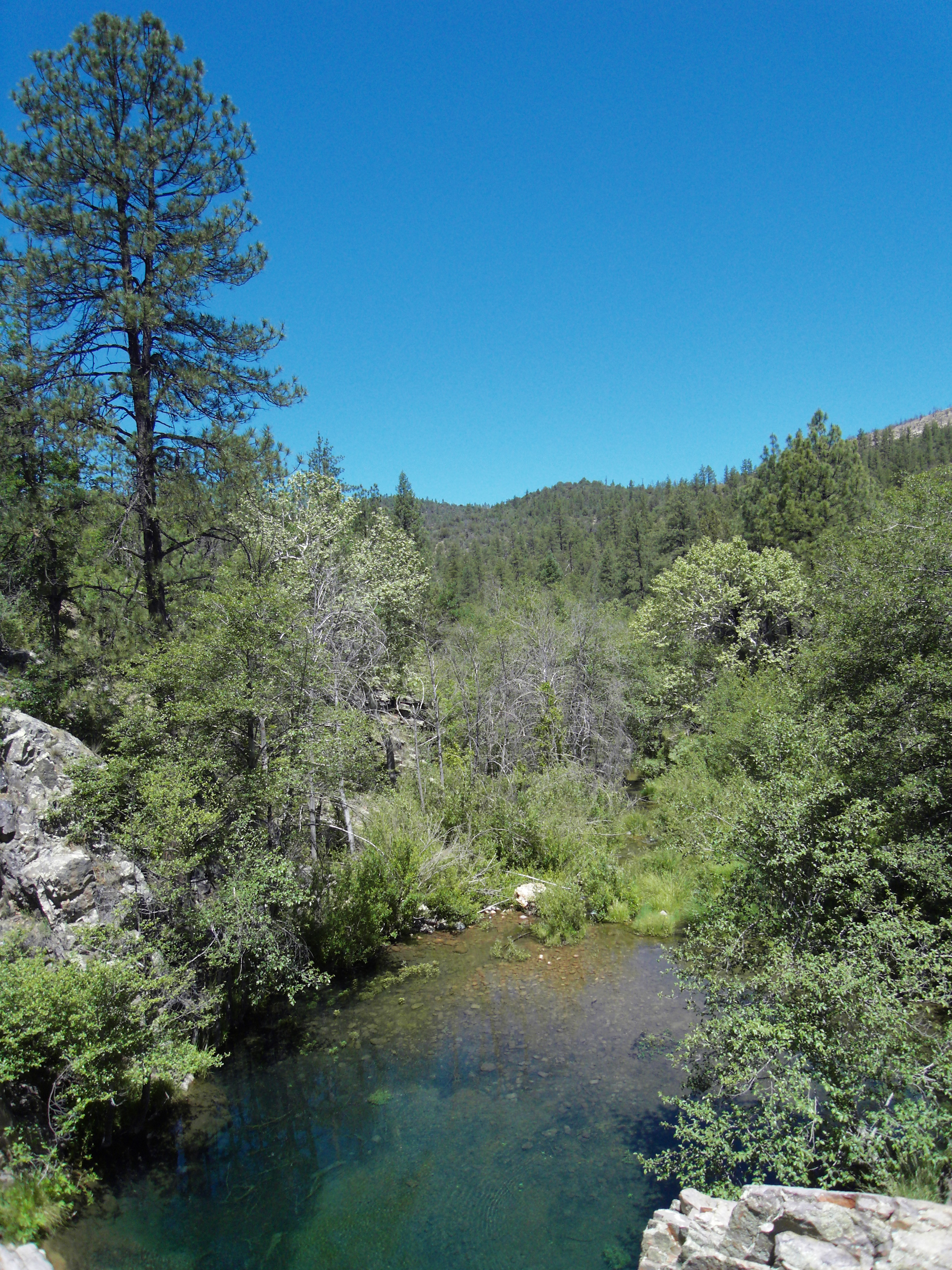
- View above the creek

- Location within Arizona Location within the United States
- Coordinates: 34°12′23″N 110°58′24″W
- Country: United States
- State: Arizona
- County: Gila

Area
  - Total: 1.61 sq mi (4.17 km^{2})
  - Land: 1.61 sq mi (4.17 km^{2})
  - Water: 0 sq mi (0.00 km^{2})
- Elevation: 5,240 ft (1,600 m)

Population (2020)
  - Total: 39
  - Density: 21.7/sq mi (8.39/km^{2})
- Time zone: UTC-7 (MST (no DST))
- Area code: 928
- FIPS code: 04-30840
- GNIS feature ID: 2582795

Haigler Creek is an unincorporated community and census-designated place (CDP) in northern Gila County, Arizona, United States. It lies at an elevation of 5,240 feet (1,597 m) and is surrounded by the Tonto National Forest. As of the 2020 census, Haigler Creek had a population of 39 people.

== History ==
Haigler Creek is named after the pioneer settler Jacob Russel "Jake" Haigler who owned a cattle ranch along the creek. He was born February 7, 1836, in Franklin County, Missouri. He made his way west, ending up in Arizona, where he started the ranch. In September 1905, during the Pleasant Valley War, Jake was traversing rugged wilderness near the creek when he was thrown from his mule and suffered from head trauma. He was found unconscious and taken to the nearby town of Young, Arizona to seek medical help. He died in Young on September 29, 1905, at the age of 69. Since then, the area has been named in recognition of him.

== Geography ==
Haigler Creek is a CDP that sits at an elevation of 5,240 feet (1,597 m) located in northern Gila County in Arizona, within the Tonto National Forest. It lies 11 miles (18 km) south of Arizona State Route 260 via East Colcord Road and a National Forest road. Payson is a total of 36 miles (58 km) west of Haigler Creek by road. The small ranch town of Young, Arizona is 12 miles (19 km) south of Haigler Creek and can be accessed via National Forest road. According to the United States Census Bureau, the CDP has a total area of 1.6 square miles (4.2 km^{2}), all land. Due to the lack of light pollution this area is great for star gazing.

Haigler Creek itself is a southwest-flowing tributary of Tonto Creek, part of the Salt River watershed that flows through the center of the community. It originates just below the Mogollon Rim in east central Arizona via a perennial spring. Rainwater and snow melt also help to keep the creek flowing during the dry months.

There is a diverse abundance of flora and fauna in the area. Trees like the Arizona Sycamore, Cottonwood, Boxelder, Willow, and Ash are found in the riparian habitats along the creek. Ponderosa Pine, Juniper, Pinyon Pine, and Oak dot the surrounding landscape. Also a variety of wildflowers can be seen in the meadows and near the creek during the warm months. The creek is stocked with Rainbow trout and Brown trout by the Arizona Game and Fish Department and is also home to many native fish species. Haigler Creek is also an important area for reptiles, amphibians, and birds. The creek is home to a variety of mammals including Elk, Mule deer, Black Bear, Javelina, Grey Fox, Mountain Lion, and Coyote. Cattle are also present. Viewing wildlife in the area is best during the morning and evening hours.

== Climate ==
Haigler Creek has a Mediterranean climate (Köppen Csa), due to its elevation at around 5,200 feet (1,585 m). Summer temperatures range from the mid 70s to high 80s but the area will occasionally reach temperatures around 90 °F (32.2 °C) or higher. During the summer months, monsoon storms develop in the late afternoon and early evening hours, bringing heavy rain, strong winds, thunder, lightning, and even hail. These thunderstorms help lower temperatures at night bringing them to the 50s.

Winters are mild with nighttime lows in the 20s and daytime temps in the 50s. Snowstorms and flurries are common during the winter months. Haigler creek gets 11.7 inches of snowfall annually. When the precipitating snow stops it takes only a few days for the snow cover to totally melt due to the areas low-mid elevation.

On Monday, November 5, 2001, the Northern Lights were visible from Payson and other areas around the Mogollon Rim and White Mountains including Pine, Strawberry, Haigler Creek, Heber-Overgaard, Show Low, McNary, and Greer . At 8:00-10:30 pm, the people of east central Arizona were treated to the natural light display due to extremely strong Solar flares that allowed the Aurora Borealis to be seen this far south. The lights appeared a deep red and pink hue.

Climate data for Haigler Creek, Arizona (Station Elevation 5,242 feet)
Month	Jan	Feb	Mar	Apr	May	Jun	Jul	Aug	Sep	Oct	Nov	Dec	Year
Average high °F (°C)	54.6 (12.5)	57.0 (13.8)	62.3 (16.8)	69.5 (20.8)	78.6 (25.8)	87.9 (31.0)	90.3 (32.4)	88.0 (31.1)	83.6 (28.7)	73.8 (23.2)	62.4 (16.9)	53.9 (12.2)	71.8 (22.1)
Average low °F (°C)	24.2 (-4.3)	26.2 (−3.2)	30.1 (−1.1)	34.7 (1.5)	41.4 (5.2)	48.8 (9.3)	58.0 (14.4)	57.8 (14.3)	50.3 (10.2)	39.9 (4.4)	29.2 (−1.5)	24.1 (−4.4)	38.7 (3.7)
Average precipitation inches (mm)	2.44 (62)	2.32 (59)	2.20 (55)	0.91 (23)	0.64 (16)	0.39 (10)	2.78 (70)	3.39 (86)	2.08 (52)	1.57 (39)	1.72 (43)	2.06 (52)	22.50 (571)
Average snowfall inches (cm)	2.6 (6)	3.8 (9)	2.3 (5)	1.1 (2)	0 (0)	0 (0)	0 (0)	0 (0)	0 (0)	trace (0.25)	0.6 (1)	1.3 (3)	11.8 (30)
Source: The Western Regional Climate Center

== Demographics ==
Haigler Creek is home to very few resident individuals or families with a population of just 39 as of the 2020 census. Many of the homes in the area are cabins or summer getaways for Phoenix and Tucson locals, due to the cooler temperatures. The ZIP code for Haigler creek is 85541 and the area code is 928.

In Haigler Creek the population is quite spread out with only 24.2 people per square mile. The median age is 65.3 years and the median household income is $13,583. There are 39 households in the area and 85 housing units which 46% are occupied. The median price of an owner occupied housing unit is $343,300. 33% of the people are married.

Historical population
Census	Pop.	%±
2010	19	—
2020	39	105.3%
U.S. Decennial Census

== Recreation ==
Surrounded by National Forest, most of the land around Haigler Creek is available to numerous recreational activities. There is no shortage of hiking trails and mountain biking is popular in this area. Open forest roads also allow great trails for ATV's and dirt bikes. Camping is also an option due to the large number of campgrounds in the area.

Located just north of Haigler Creek are the rim lakes (Willow Springs, Bear Canyon, Woods Canyon, and Knoll) on top of the Mogollon Rim in Coconino County. At 7,500 ft (2286 m)+, These medium-sized reservoirs in the Apache-Sitgreaves National Forest boast an abundance of wildlife and recreation. All the lakes are stocked with a variety of trout and both Willow Springs and Woods Canyon Lakes have a boat ramp. Woods Canyon Lake also has a marina and lake store. Knoll and Bear Canyon lakes are more remote and the use of a 4-wheel drive high clearance vehicle is recommended.

The Matazal Hotel & Casino is a tribal casino, located on the Tonto Apache Indian Reservation just south of Payson. The casino hosts numerous events, festivals, and concerts year round.

The Tonto Natural Bridge, one of the largest natural bridges in the world is located 30 minutes northwest of Payson. It lies within the Tonto Natural Bridge State Park and is a unit of the Arizona State Park System. There are overlooks and catwalks down in the canyon and through the cave. The Goodfellow Lodge is a historic lodge in the park that includes exhibits and artifacts on the history of the bridge and the Native Americans that inhabited the area.

== Nearest cities and towns ==
- Payson
- Rye
- Pine
- Strawberry
- Star Valley
- Oxbow Estates
- Kohls Ranch
- Bear Flat
- Young
- Forest Lakes
- Heber-Overgaaurd
