= Wallow Fire =

2011 wildfire in Arizona and New Mexico, USA

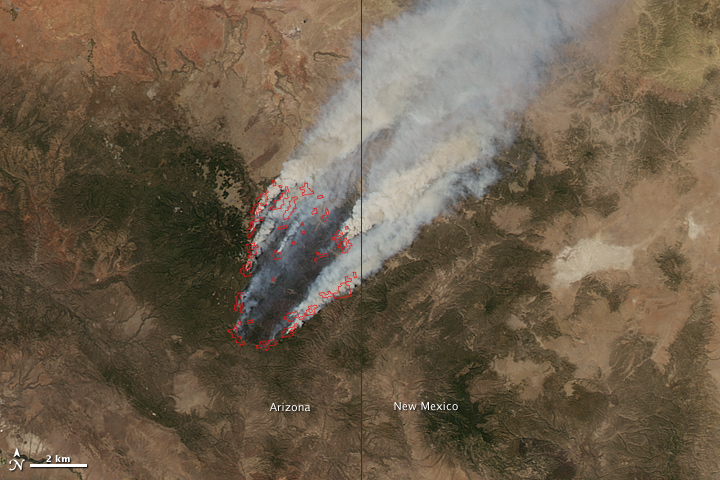
- NASA satellite image, June 8, 2011, at 1:25 PM MDT
- Date: May 29, 2011 – July 8, 2011
- Location: Arizona; New Mexico
- Coordinates: 33.602°N 109.449°W

Statistics
- Burned area: 538,049 acres (2,177 km^{2}): 522,642 acres (2,115 km^{2}) in Arizona; 15,407 acres (62 km^{2}) in New Mexico

Impacts
- Injuries: 16
- Structures lost: 72

Ignition
- Cause: Campfire

Map
- Perimeter of Wallow Fire (map data)
- Location within Arizona

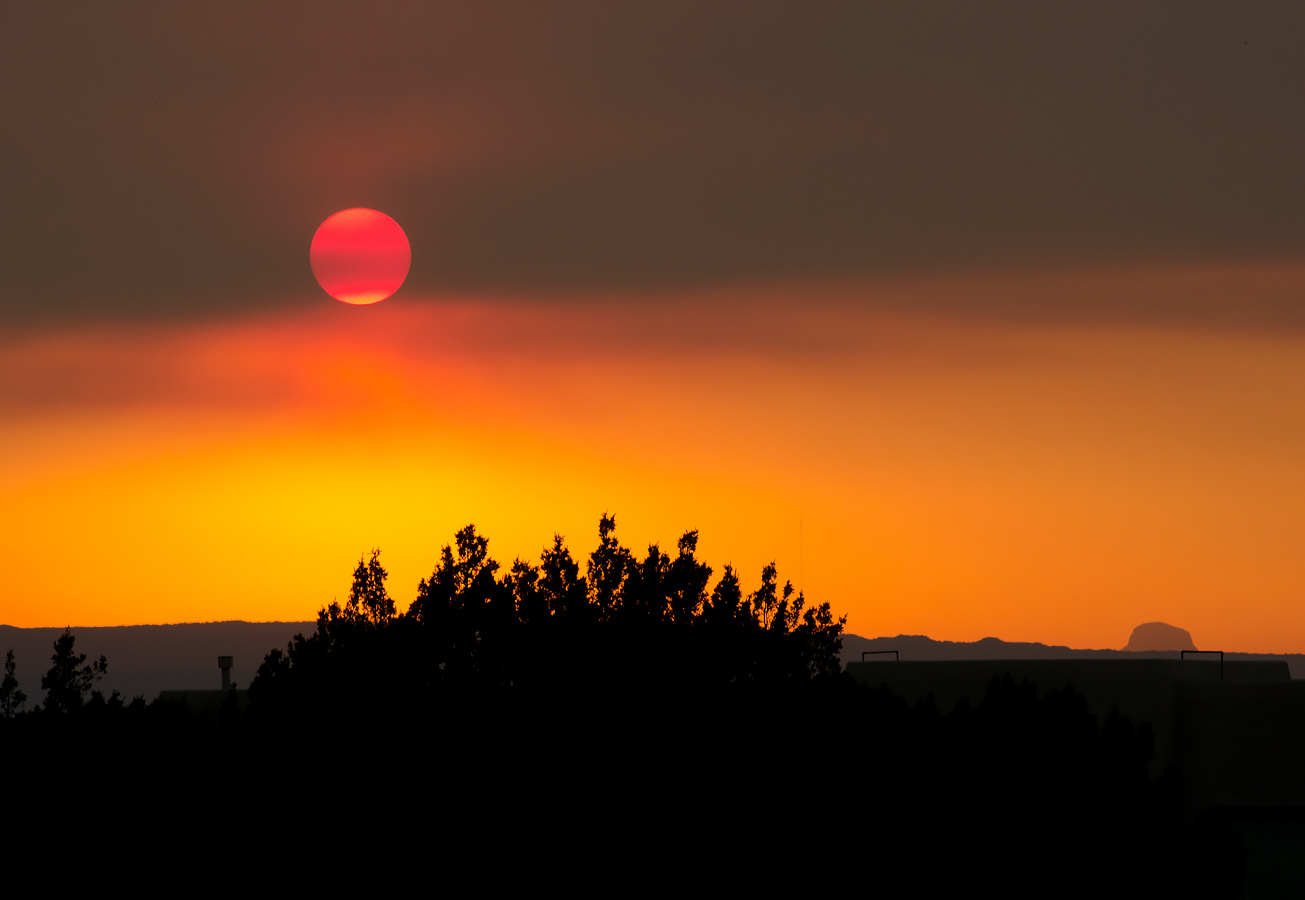
Smoke from Wallow Fire in Albuquerque, New Mexico, sunset, June 7, 2011

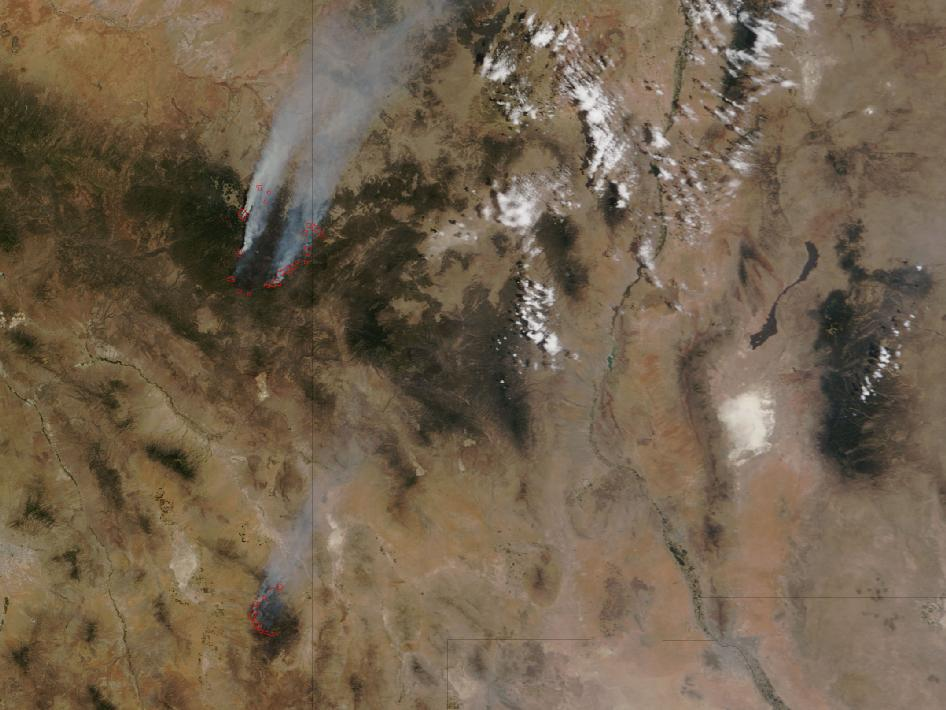
Wallow North and Horseshoe Two Fires (lower left), Arizona. NASA satellite image, midday, June 12, 2011. Vertical line is AZ-NM state line.

The Wallow Fire was a wildfire that started in the White Mountains near Alpine, Arizona on May 29, 2011. It was named for the Bear Wallow Wilderness area where the fire originated, The fire eventually spread across the stateline into western New Mexico, United States. By the time the fire was contained on July 8, it had consumed 538,049 acres (2,177 km^{2}) of land, 522,642 acres (2,115 km^{2}) in Arizona and 15,407 acres (62 km^{2}) in New Mexico. It was the largest wildfire in Arizona history.

== Cause ==
The fire was started accidentally by two men who were camping. They cooperated with prosecutors and pleaded guilty to misdemeanor charges relating to mismanagement of their campfire. In November, 2012 they were ordered to pay restitution in the amount of $3.7 million.

== Response ==
The communities of Alpine, Blue River, Greer, Nutrioso, Sunrise, Springerville, Eagar in Arizona, and Luna in New Mexico were evacuated. In addition to other aircraft, a converted DC-10 Very Large Air Tanker ("VLAT"), capable of dropping up to 12,000 gallons of fire retardant in seconds, was deployed to help fight the fire. On June 11, 2011, the leading edge of the fire advanced into Catron County, New Mexico.

On June 12, evacuations were lifted for Eagar, Springerville and South Fork. On June 14, the Wallow Fire became the largest fire in Arizona history, passing the Rodeo-Chediski Fire, which burned 732 square miles (1,900 km^{2}) in 2002. On June 18 and 20, evacuations were lifted for Alpine and Greer and on June 21, the evacuation for Luna, NM was lifted. Additionally, the Apache National Forest was closed to the public.

On July 3, the fire was 95% contained. The Wallow Fire was declared 100% contained as of 6 p.m., July 8.

== Damage ==
Four commercial buildings were destroyed; 36 outbuildings were destroyed and one damaged; 32 residences were destroyed and 5 damaged. The estimated cost was $109 million.

== Widespread smoke plume ==
The thick smoke in the NASA satellite image was only part of the smoky haze plaguing the continental United States in early June 2011. According to the U.S. Air Quality "Smog Blog ", smoke from fires in Arizona and New Mexico extended through Texas and Oklahoma up into the Great Lakes region, affecting air quality for large areas east of the Rocky Mountains.

== See also ==
- 2011 Horseshoe 2 Fire
