= Chevelon Canyon Lake =

Reservoir in Coconino County, Arizona

- Location within Arizona
- Location: Coconino County, Arizona, United States
- Coordinates: 34°29′54″N 110°49′28″W
- Type: reservoir
- Primary inflows: Chevelon Creek
- Primary outflows: Chevelon Creek
- Basin countries: United States
- Surface area: 208 acres (84 ha)
- Average depth: 35 ft (11 m)
- Max. depth: 80 ft (24 m)
- Surface elevation: 6,366 ft (1,940 m)

Chevelon Canyon Lake is a small reservoir located in northern Arizona, about 28 mi (45 km) northwest of the town of Heber. It is one in a series of small, canyon-bound lakes located on the Mogollon Rim, collectively referred to as the Rim Lakes. It is said to be among the most difficult to access in the region. It is also the second reservoir on Chevelon Creek, downstream from Woods Canyon Lake. The facilities are maintained by Apache–Sitgreaves National Forests division of the USDA Forest Service.

== Description ==
Chevelon Canyon Lake was constructed in 1965 as part of a flood control and recreational project. It is small and moderately deep, having an average depth of 35 ft (11 m) and a surface area of 200 acres (81 ha). The long, narrow lake is formed by an earthen dam impounding the Chevelon Creek in the eponymous Chevelon Canyon. Long Tom Tank, Willow Springs Lake, and Woods Canyon Lake, drain into upper Chevelon Creek, which flows into and through Chevelon Canyon Lake. Chevelon Creek drains to the northeast to the Little Colorado River.

The lake is accessible via 30 miles (48 km) of unpaved forest road, Forest Road 169 and Forest Road 169B, much of which is difficult or impossible to pass due to heavy winter snowfalls between November and April. There is no direct road access to the lake, the final .75 mi (1.21 km) segment being closed to vehicular access and requires a short hike. As the gated road does not allow vehicle access the lake, boating is limited to small, light canoes or personal flotation devices that can be carried to the primitive boat ramp. Boat motors on the lake are restricted to a single gas motor no larger than 10 horsepower. Amenities are limited to semi-primitive campsites with a restroom, located on the west side of the lake.

== Fish species ==
In spite of the lake's remoteness and lack of access, it is a premier fishing location due to its stock of rainbow and brown trout. The Arizona Game and Fish Department's desired species assemblage in Chevelon Canyon Lake is rainbow trout, brown trout, and Little Colorado sucker. Rainbow trout is stocked once per year, while Colorado sucker reproduce naturally in the lake and brown trout reproduce in the stream entering the lake. It has been proposed that the department resume stocking Arctic grayling, last stocked in 1990.
