= Battleground Gunfight =

1901 gunfight in Arizona

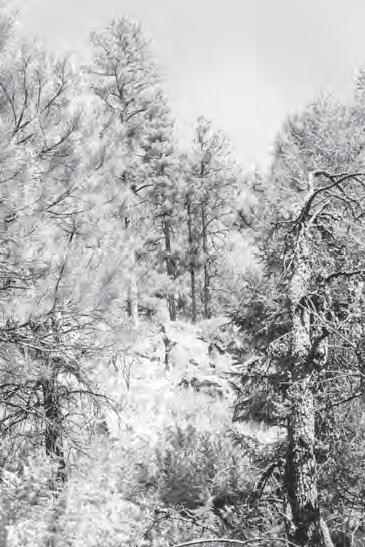
- The ridge where the posse was positioned
- Date: October 8, 1901
- Location: Fort Apache Indian Reservation, Arizona Territory, United States
- Also known as: Battleground Shootout
- Participants: Bill Smith
- Outcome: Outlaws escape
- Deaths: 2
- Injuries: 2

The Battleground Gunfight, also known as the Battleground Shootout, was a gunfight between a posse of American lawmen and the Smith Gang. It was fought on October 8, 1901, within Arizona Territory's Fort Apache Indian Reservation, at a clearing in the forest known today as the "Battleground". Nine Arizona Rangers and deputies caught up with the cattle rustler Bill Smith and his gang. During a long exchange of gunfire that followed, Ranger Carlos Tafolla and Deputy Bill Maxwell were killed and one or two of the outlaws may have been wounded. In the end, the Smith Gang escaped the posse and fled into Mexico.

== Background ==
The Arizona Rangers were established in 1901 and the Battleground Gunfight became the first major shootout to involve the new police force. The Smith Gang was one of the first targets for the rangers. In northeastern Graham County, Bill Smith owned a ranch on the Blue River, where he lived with his mother and his younger brothers and sisters. The ranch house served as a base for rustling cattle from nearby settlers, such as Henry Barrett, a former Rough Rider. In 1898, the Smith brothers were arrested for stealing unbranded calves from Barrett and Bill Phelps. Bill Smith assumed full responsibility, so he was sent to jail at St. Johns. Because of this, Bill was said to have developed a grudge against Henry Barrett. During the first week of October 1901, the Smith Gang was spotted at Pat Knoll, near Springerville, heading south with a herd of fifteen or twenty stolen horses. Police informants said the gang was on their way from Utah, where they robbed a train. A few days later, Bill and his brother Al came across Henry Barrett and another cowboy in the Big Cienega range. During the confrontation, Bill threatened to kill Barrett, so the latter informed the sheriff of Apache County, who organized a posse.

The posse was led by the sheriff's deputy, Hank Sharp, and included Henry Barrett and two other locals named Pete Peterson and Elijah Holgate. Meanwhile, the Arizona Rangers Carlos Tafolla and Duane Hamblin were assigned to search for the Smith Gang. At Greer, the rangers and the posse met, and they decided to work together in tracking and capturing the outlaws. The rangers then deputized Barrett, Peterson and Holgate and they began following the outlaws' trail to the Little Colorado River, which they forded at a place known as Sheep's Crossing. From there the posse went to the ranch of Lorenzo Crosby to enlist his services and that of the brothers Arch and William Thomas "Bill" Maxwell, both of whom were described as being excellent scouts. These three men were deputized as well, making the posse a force of nine men altogether. After that, the posse continued along the trail south to Big Lake and then to Dead Man's Crossing on the Black River. On October 7, at a ranch belonging to Pete Slaughter, the posse found an abandoned camp that was believed to have been recently occupied by the outlaws. The rangers decided to camp at the same location for the night and then proceed down the west side of the riverbank on the following morning.

== Gunfight ==
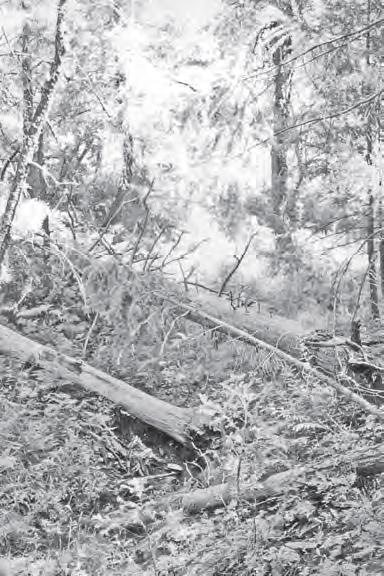
The canyon where the Smith Gang was positioned

On the morning of Tuesday, October 8, the posse awoke, had breakfast, and then saddled to continue down the river. Along the way they passed the Pair-O'Dice Ranch. The area is part of the White Mountains and thus heavily forested and difficult to traverse. It was also very cold, and snow covered the ground. That day the Smith Gang was camped at Reservation Creek, just inside the western border of the Fort Apache reservation, in a canyon 200 yards (180 m) wide and 100 feet (30 m) deep, near the source of the Black River. Today the location is near the shoreline of Reservation Lake. The Smith gang were in need of food so that afternoon they killed a bear, and the shots were heard by the posse 0.5 miles (0.80 km) away. Eventually, the Maxwell brothers found the location of the bear shooting and blood trails in the snow led back to the Smiths' camp, which was 6 miles (9.7 km) from where the posse camped. By then it was almost night. As the posse approached the canyon, the Smiths' guard dog began barking. This alerted Bill Smith, who went up to the canyon's rim to have a better look. There he saw the posse coming towards the camp, so he ran back to tell the others.

Bill Smith's gang included his brothers Al, George and Floyd, a brother-in-law named Adam Slagger, and two other unidentified men. Of the nine-man posse, only Henry Barrett had any combat experience, having fought with Theodore Roosevelt at the Battle of San Juan Hill in 1898. At a place 300 yards (270 m) away from camp, the posse dismounted their horses and tied them up to some trees in order to confront the outlaws on foot. The posse then headed to the camp from the west, which meant that the lawmen would have to fire into the sunlight if a firefight began. The deep canyon was shadowed, and it provided a good defensive position for the Smith Gang. When the posse reached the camp, Tafolla, Hamblin and Bill Maxwell continued forward into a clearing to demand the outlaws' surrender while Barrett and the five others remained behind the cover of a ridge. After Bill Maxwell called out the demand, Bill Smith replied: "All right, which way do you want us to come out?" Maxwell responded: "Come right out this way." About this time, Barrett, who could see what was going on from the ridge, yelled out for Tafolla and the two others to lie down for cover, but only Hamblin took the advice.

A moment later, Bill Smith appeared with a Savage Model 1895 .30 caliber rifle concealed behind his back. Then, suddenly, he revealed his weapon and began firing it. It was at this time Bill Maxwell was hit in the forehead and died instantly. Then Tafolla was shot twice through the torso and fell to the ground. He did, however, manage to pull out his revolver and returned the fire, which was followed by the others on both sides. The skirmish lasted for at least a couple of hours, and it was already dark when it ended. During the fighting, Ranger Hamblin maneuvered around the canyon where the outlaws were firing from to drive off their horses. Therefore, when the Smith Gang chose to make their escape that night, they had to climb out of the canyon on foot, which they eventually succeeded in doing. The posse captured the gang's camp, but they did not pursue the criminals any further due to the wounded Tafolla, who was in need of a doctor.

== Aftermath ==
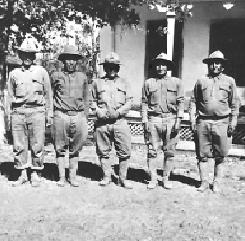
From left to right, First Sergeant Chicken, Jesse Palmer, Tea Square, Sergeant Big Chow, and Corporal C. F. Josh at Fort Apache in 1919

After the Smith Gang made their escape, Hank Sharp and Arch Maxwell left the scene for Nutrioso, twenty miles away, to summon a doctor named Rudd and spread the news of the fight. The remainder of the posse stayed at the camp with Tafolla and the body of Bill Maxwell. Tafolla died before the doctor could arrive. Before passing, he gave Henry Barrett a silver dollar and said: "Give this to my wife. It, and the month's wages coming to me will be all she will ever have." The outlaws made their way out of the canyon and into what is now Bear Wallow Wilderness. On the next evening they arrived at a cow camp on Beaver Creek. The cowboys there were held hostage and ordered to prepare food for the gang. Bill Smith recognized one of the hostages, Marion Lee, who made dinner for the gang members and informed them that they had killed Bill Maxwell. Bill Smith did not realize that one of the men he had shot at was his friend, so he told Lee: "When he stood up that way we thought he was Barrett. Barrett was the man we wanted. We feel mighty sorry over killing Will [Bill] Maxwell, he was a good friend of ours. Tell his mother for us that we're very sorry we killed him."

After taking a few horses, the gang headed into the Blue River Wilderness for the ranch of Hugh McKean, where they hoped to trade horses. When McKean refused to deal with the gang he was held at gunpoint and robbed of his horses, food, and weapons. The Smith Gang then went east and crossed the Arizona border with New Mexico before heading south into Texas and across the Rio Grande into Mexico. When the captain of the Arizona Rangers, Burton C. Mossman, was informed of the fight he sent three of his men after the outlaws and the United States Army dispatched the Apache Scouts Chicken and Josh. The scouts tracked the gang across New Mexico before losing the trail at the banks of the Rio Grande. Ultimately, the posse failed to capture the outlaws and bring them to justice, but they were successful in running the Smith Gang out of Arizona Territory. Tafolla and Maxwell were killed as result of the gunfight and one or two of the outlaws may have been wounded by Barrett, who was armed with a souvenir Spanish Mauser rifle, which could shoot right through the trees the gang members were hiding behind.

The body of Tafolla was laid to rest at St. Johns and Bill Maxwell was buried in his family's cemetery at Nutrioso. Maxwell's hat was left behind at the scene because the men of the posse thought it would be bad luck to touch it. For years afterwards, cowboys claimed they had seen the hat while working in the area.

== See also ==
- List of Old West gunfights
