= Smith Gang =

American Old West cattle rustlers

- Years active: 1898-1901
- Membership: 7
- Activities: Cattle rustling

The Smith Gang was a band of American cattle rustlers who operated in the Southwest during the late 1890s to 1901. The gang was founded by Bill Smith and included six others, mainly Bill's family members. After an encounter with the law in Arizona Territory, known as the Battleground Gunfight, the Smith Gang was forced to escape to Mexico in October 1901.

== History ==
The gang was formed no later than 1898 and included Bill Smith, his younger brothers Al, George and Floyd, a brother in law named Adam Slagger and two other unidentified men. Before moving to Arizona, Bill was a rustler in the Indian Territory where he worked with the Dalton Gang. In 1898 the Smith brothers were living with their mother and sisters at a ranch located near the Blue River in northeastern Graham County, Arizona. That year the brothers were arrested for stealing unbranded calves from ranchers Henry Barrett, a former Rough Rider, and Bill Phelps. Bill assumed full responsibility for the crime so his brothers were released. Bill spent the next several months in jail at St. Johns and he was said to have developed a grudge against Henry Barrett. Eventually Bill planned to make his escape from police custody. The jailer at St. Johns, Tom Berry, found Bill to be such a hard sleeper that it was necessary to enter his cell every morning to wake him up. One morning when Berry walked into the cell, Bill Smith revealed a .45 caliber revolver which had been smuggled to him by his brother Al. Bill then locked Berry in the cell and escaped to New Mexico Territory for a year. By 1900 the gang was well known in the Southwest for their thievery along the Mogollon Rim.

=== Battleground Gunfight ===
In the first week of October 1901, the gang was spotted near Springerville with fifteen to twenty stolen horses. According to informants, the group was on their way home from Utah where they allegedly robbed a train. A few days later Henry Barrett, in company with another cowboy, were confronted by Bill Smith and his brother Al in the Big Cienega range. During which Henry Barrett was held captive for some time and Bill threatened to kill him but eventually Barrett was released and he informed the local sheriff at St. Johns. On the next day the sheriff organized a posse to go after the Smith Gang. It was to be led by his deputy, Hank Sharp, who would ride with Henry Barrett and two other ranchers. At Greer the posse met up with the Arizona Rangers Carlos Tofolla and Duane Hamblin who were also looking for the Smiths. The two forces decided to combine their strength and they followed the outlaws' trail to a crossing at the Little Colorado River. There they decided to detour east to the ranch of Lorenzo Crosby to ask for his help in pursuing the gang, to which Crosby agreed.

The brothers Arch and William "Bill" Maxwell also lived on the Crosby ranch and they were considered to be great at tracking, both of them joined the posse as well. After that the lawmen continued on the outlaws trail which led to their camp, just within the western border of the Fort Apache Reservation. The camp was located along a creek, within a deep canyon, near the Black River, and the posse confronted the gang from the canyon's western opening on the afternoon of October 8. In the gunfight that followed, the posse had to fire into the setting sun while the position of the outlaws was shaded. Initially the rangers Tofolla and Hamblin demanded that the gang surrender, Bill Smith replied that he would, but when Bill made his appearance, he opened fire with his rifle. The first three shots fired by Bill Smith hit Tofolla twice in the chest and the deputized rancher Bill Maxwell in the head. Maxwell died instantly but Tofolla returned fire with his revolver. For the next couple of hours the two sides skirmished until it was too dark to continue fighting.

Tofolla later died that night and he and Bill Maxwell were the only casualties on the posse's side. One or two of the gang members may have been wounded by Barrett who carried a Spanish Mauser that could shoot through trees. During the gunfight, Ranger Duane Hamblin scattered the gang's horses which forced them to have to retreat from the canyon on foot. The posse did not pursue any further though so the Smith Gang escaped to New Mexico and then Texas, stealing horses, guns, and food, from settlers, along the way. Another posse was organized to go after the Smith Gang, and the United States Army dispatched two Apache Scouts, Chicken and Josh, to help in the search, but the scouts lost the outlaws' trail at the Rio Grande, the international border between Texas and Mexico. Following this the Smith Gang ceased to exist as a criminal enterprise in the United States but they may have continued their life of crime in Mexico.

Bill Smith and his brother Al made their way to Galveston, Texas, where they took a boat to Argentina. Bill Smith later returned to Douglas, Arizona, where he became involved in a gunfight with Douglas Arizona Constable Tom Vaughn and Constable Dayton Graham May 16, 1903. Smith managed to escape after killing Vaughan and severely injuring Graham. After Dayton recovered he spent several months tracking down Smith in Southern Arizona. On July 5, 1903, Dayton found Smith in a saloon at a monte table in Douglas, Arizona, and killed him.

George Smith returned to Arizona in 1909 and surrendered himself to Sheriff Jim Parks of Graham County. However, since the only charges against him had been filed in Apache County, he was released from custody and returned to his mother's ranch on the Blue River.
