= Ecks Mountain =

Landform in Apache County, Arizona

- Location within Arizona Location within the United States

Highest point
- Elevation: 7,861 ft (2,396 m)
- Prominence: 320 feet (98 m)
- Isolation: 0.74 mi (1.19 km) to Division Tank Knoll
- Coordinates: 34°13′23.60″N 109°45′49.10″W

Geography
- Location: Apache County, Arizona, United States
- Parent range: White Mountains
- Topo map: USGS Sponseller Mountain – GEOLOGY -->

Geology
- Rock age: <4 Million years ago
- Rock type: Basaltic rocks
- Volcanic zone: Springerville Volcanic Field

Climbing
- Easiest route: Road Hike, Open Country

Ecks Mountain is in Apache County, Arizona, and is part of the White Mountains. Ecks Mountain is in the Sitgreaves National Forest and can be accessed from a short spur off the Land of the Pioneers trail.
