= Rattlesnake Fire (2018) =

2018 wildfire in Arizona, United States

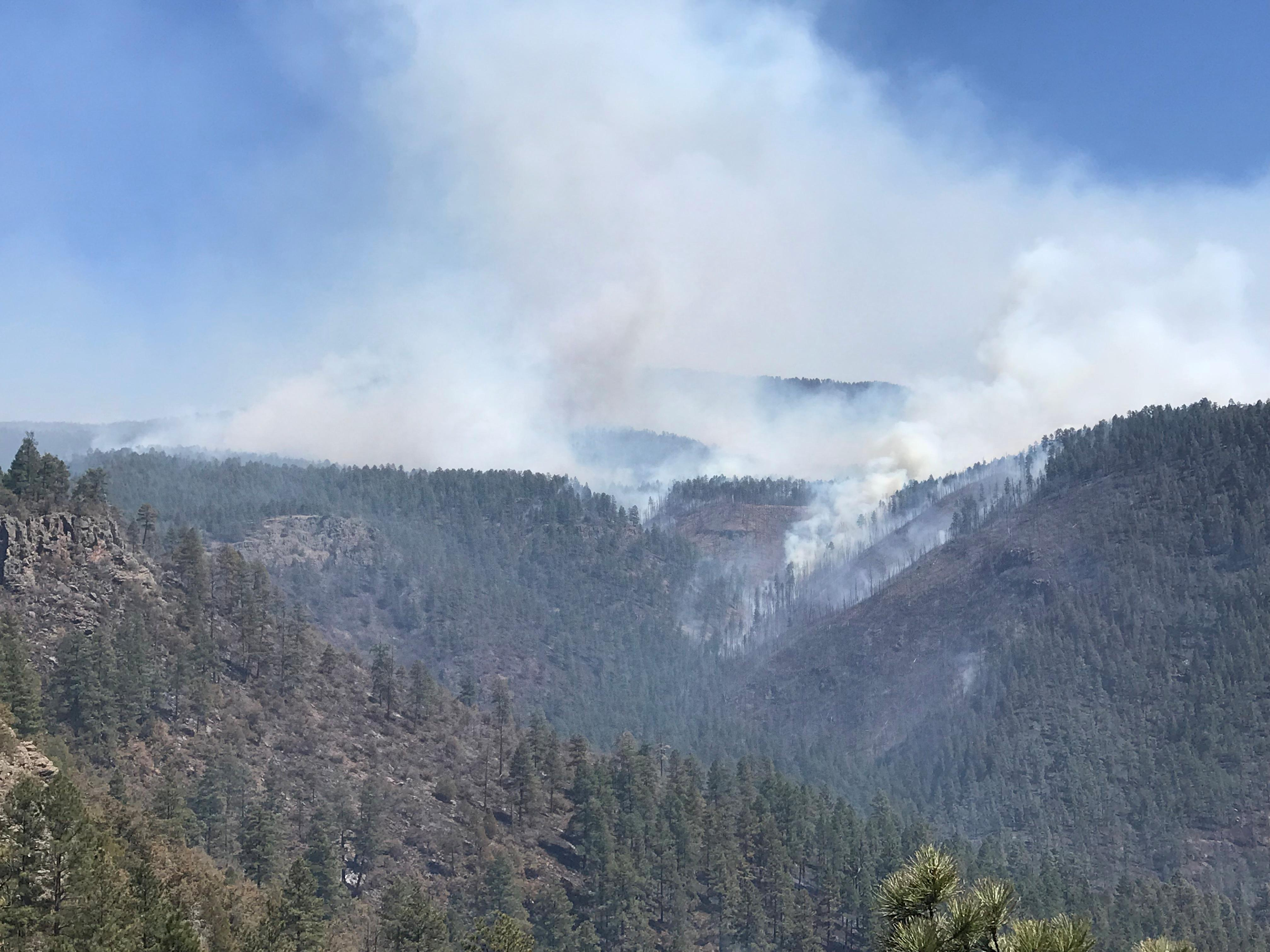
- Smoke rising from the Rattlesnake Fire, April 13, 2018
- Date: April 11 – May 27, 2018
- Location: Navajo and Utah Counties, Arizona, US
- Coordinates: 33.656°N 109.506°W

Statistics
- Burned area: 26,072 acres (10,551 ha; 40.738 sq mi)

Impacts
- Injuries: 15
- Cost: $11.4 million

Ignition
- Cause: Unknown

Map
- Location within Arizona Location within the United States

The Rattlesnake Fire was a wildfire that burned 26,072 acres (10,551 ha) in Navajo and Greenlee Counties, in Arizona. The fire was detected on April 11, 2018, on the Fort Apache Indian Reservation and spread onto the San Carlos Indian Reservation and Apache-Sitgreaves National Forests over the following four days. Fanned by high winds, the Rattlesnake Fire spread rapidly until it was contained on May 1, however it continued to burn within containment until May 27. No structures were damaged or destroyed by the fire, but 15 firefighters were injured. Investigators suspected the cause of the fire was human activity, but it was never determined with certainty.

== Background ==
Wildfires are a natural part of the ecological cycle of the Southwestern United States. The Rattlesnake Fire was one of 2,000 wildfires that burned 165,356 acres (669.17 km^{2}) in Arizona in 2018. In January 2018, Doug Ducey, the Governor of Arizona, warned that Arizona—then in a historically dry winter season, plagued by drought, and recovering from the 2017 wildfire season—could face a "disastrous" wildfire season in 2018. In June 2019, the Ecological Restoration Institute (ERI) at Northern Arizona University published a study of the 2018 wildfire season in Arizona and New Mexico. The ERI observed that the amount of land burned in the 2018 season was below the average of the previous ten seasons. 13 fires were studied, of which four were in Arizona and included the Rattlesnake Fire.

== Fire ==
Around 1:30 PM (MST) on April 11, 2018, a 165-acre (67 ha) fire was detected east of Rattlesnake Point, on the Fort Apache Indian Reservation in Navajo County, Arizona. High winds fed the Rattlesnake Fire and grounded firefighting aviation until April 14. As a result, the burned area grew rapidly; on April 12, it spread to 400 acres (160 ha) and into the Apache-Sitgreaves National Forests. The fire expanded into the San Carlos Indian Reservation the next day and then, on April 14, into the Bear Wallow Wilderness, in Greenlee County. By April 15, the Rattlesnake Fire had grown to 2,644 acres (1,070 ha).

By April 17, the Rattlesnake Fire had grown to 6,271 acres (2,538 ha), then nearly doubled to 11,339 acres (4,589 ha) the next day. Firefighters were able to make substantial progress on April 22 due to improved weather, and estimated that the spread of the Rattlesnake Fire had been 25% contained. By April 24, high winds were again fanning the Rattlesnake Fire, which grew over to 21,513 acres (8,706 ha) the next day. The fire then grew to 25,996 acres (10,520 ha) by April 29, by which time its containment was estimated at 63%. It grew to its maximum extent—26,072 acres (10,551 ha)—on May 1. Cooler, wetter weather aided firefighters in increasing the Rattlesnake Fire's containment to 82% by May 3. The fire continued to burn in containment until going out on May 27.

== Aftermath ==
The Rattlesnake Fire burned 26,072 acres (10,551 ha) over 46 days in the Fort Apache Indian Reservation, San Carlos Indian Reservation, and Apache-Sitgreaves National Forests. More than 500 firefighters worked to contain and suppress the Rattlesnake Fire. Only 1,000 acres (400 ha) of the total burned area suffered severe foliage mortality and the burn scar was judged almost in its entirety to have not been severely burned. Containment and suppression of the Rattlesnake Fire cost $11.4 million (equivalent to $14,616,353 in 2025). No structures were damaged or destroyed by the Rattlesnake Fire, but 15 firefighters were injured while working to contain its spread.

The United States Forest Service began investigating the cause of the Rattlesnake Fire on April 14, suspecting human activity. No definite cause was determined.
