= Ackre Lake =

Lake in Greenlee County, Arizona

Aker Lake
- Location within Arizona
- Location: Greenlee County, Arizona
- Coordinates: 33°37′00″N 109°20′39″W
- Basin countries: United States
- Surface area: 2 acres (0.81 ha)
- Average depth: 10 ft (3.0 m)
- Surface elevation: 8,600 ft (2,600 m)

Aker Lake is located in the White Mountains southwest of Alpine, Arizona, off State Route 191. This lake is located in and administered by the Apache-Sitgreaves National Forests. The lake is stocked with Apache trout and Arctic grayling. Tiger salamanders are also found in Aker Lake.

== Fish species ==
- Apache trout
- Arctic Grayling
