= Willow Springs Lake =

Lake in Coconino County, Arizona, U.S.

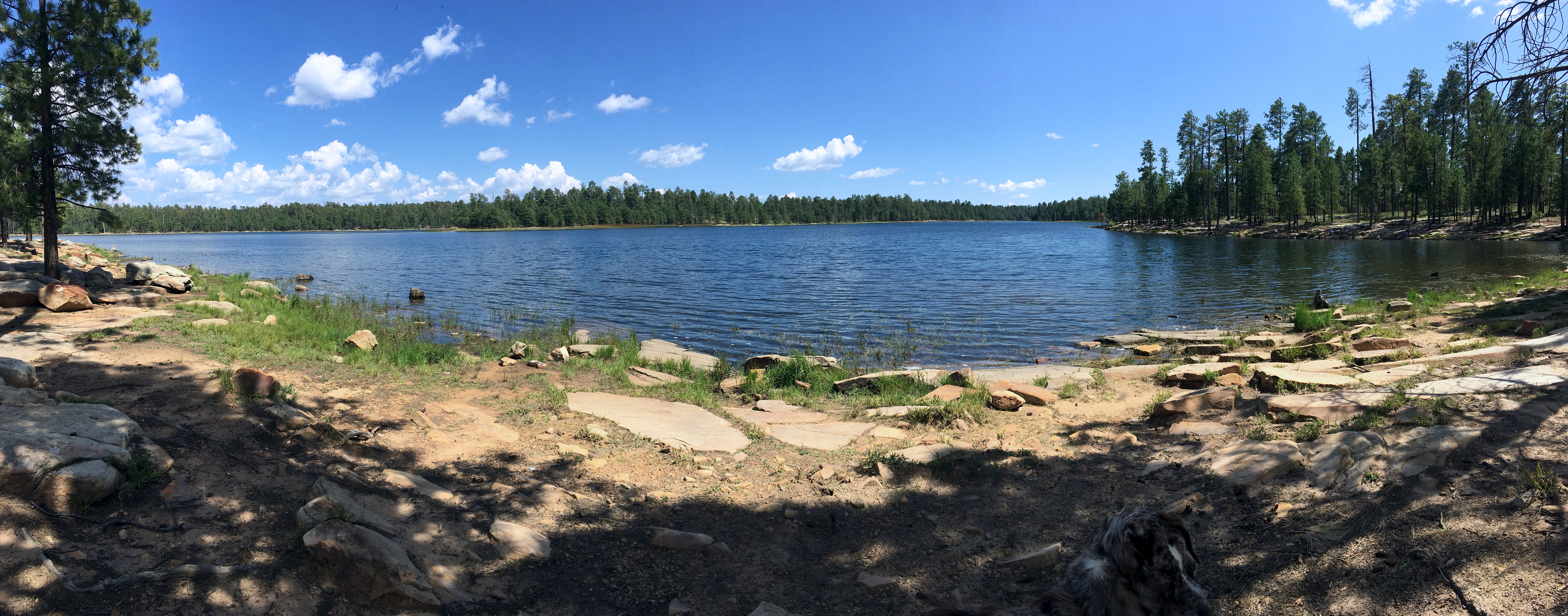

- Location within Arizona
- Location: Coconino County, Arizona, US
- Coordinates: 34°18′12.78″N 110°52′14.19″W
- Type: Reservoir
- Primary inflows: Runoff
- Primary outflows: Willow Springs Canyon
- Basin countries: United States
- Surface area: 158 acres (640,000 m^{2})
- Average depth: 60 ft (18 m)
- Surface elevation: 7,513 ft (2,290 m)

Willow Springs Lake is a cold water lake located on top of the Mogollon Rim in northern Arizona, about 23 mi (37 km) east of the city of Payson in the Apache-Sitgreaves National Forests, immediately adjacent to SR 260. It is a canyon-bound lake located on the Mogollon Rim, and is part of the collectivity known as the Rim Lakes. It can be found upstream from Chevelon Canyon Lake. The facilities are maintained by Apache-Sitgreaves National Forests division of the USDA Forest Service.

== Description ==
In 1967, the Arizona Game and Fish Department created Willow Springs Lake in order to provide water based recreational opportunities for the public. Willow Springs Lake is small and moderately deep with an average depth of 60 ft (18 m) and a surface area of 158 acres (640,000 m^{2}). Boat motors are restricted to electric or 10 hp or less gas motors. From April through September the lake is regularly stocked with rainbow trout and tiger trout. Self-sustaining largemouth bass, fathead minnows, smallmouth bass, crayfish, and green sunfish can also be found in the lake. Black crappie has been reported. Ice fishing is possible on the lake for fishermen during the winter months. According to the Arizona Game and Fish Department, "Willow Springs Lake is one of the most visited lakes in the region, due in part to its proximity to the Phoenix area and cool temperatures".

The lake is well developed, having 26 maintained campsites at Sinkhole Campground, barrier-free toilets, two picnic ramadas, two boat benches, and paved boat ramp access located on the west side of the lake at the main access point. Willow Springs Lake is accessible via paved Forest Road 149 from April through November. From December through March, the lake freezes over and is inaccessible for vehicles. The lake can also be accessed via a dirt road to Sardine Point between the two arms of the lake, or by hiking to the upper ends of the two arms from SR 260.

Willow Springs Lake has no permanent inflow, but receives enough snow melt every year to keep the lake full. The Arizona Game and Fish Department holds sole water rights to the lake. Unless spill-off occurs during the spring, no water is released downstream for irrigation or other uses. Most of the year, no spill occurs. When spill occurs, it drains down Willow Springs Canyon for 3.4 miles and merges with Woods Canyon to form Chevelon Creek. Chevelon Creek has seasonal water flow for 12.2 miles down to Chevelon Canyon Lake.

== Fish species ==
Catchable-sized rainbow trout and tiger trout are stock into Willow Springs lake from April through September. Illegally introduced smallmouth bass, green sunfish, and largemouth bass reproduce in the lake as well. Fathead minnows reproduce in the lake as well. Black crappie has been reported in the lake as well. Also crayfish are abundant in the lake.

== Gallery ==
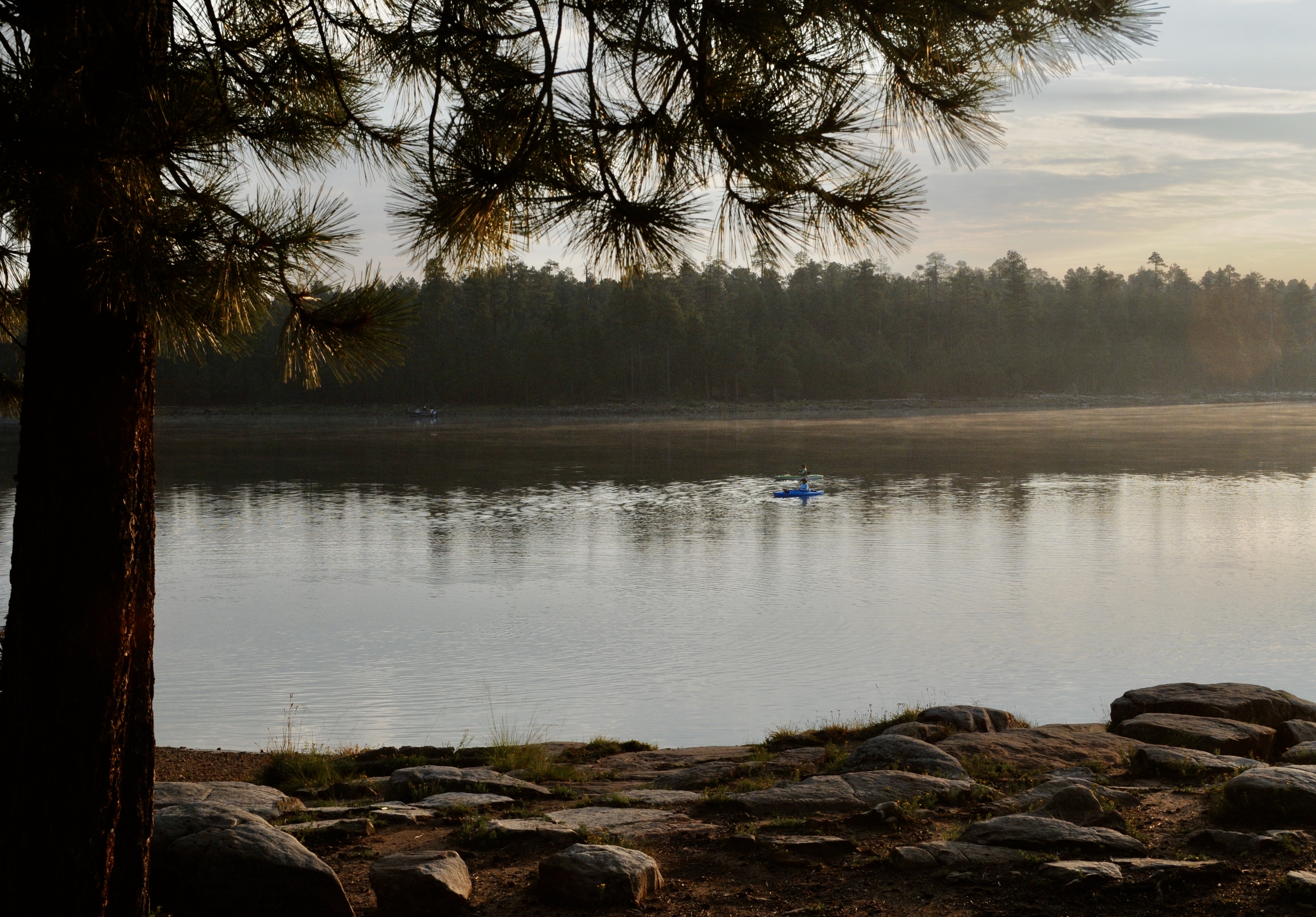
Willow Springs Lake on the Mogollon Rim in Arizona

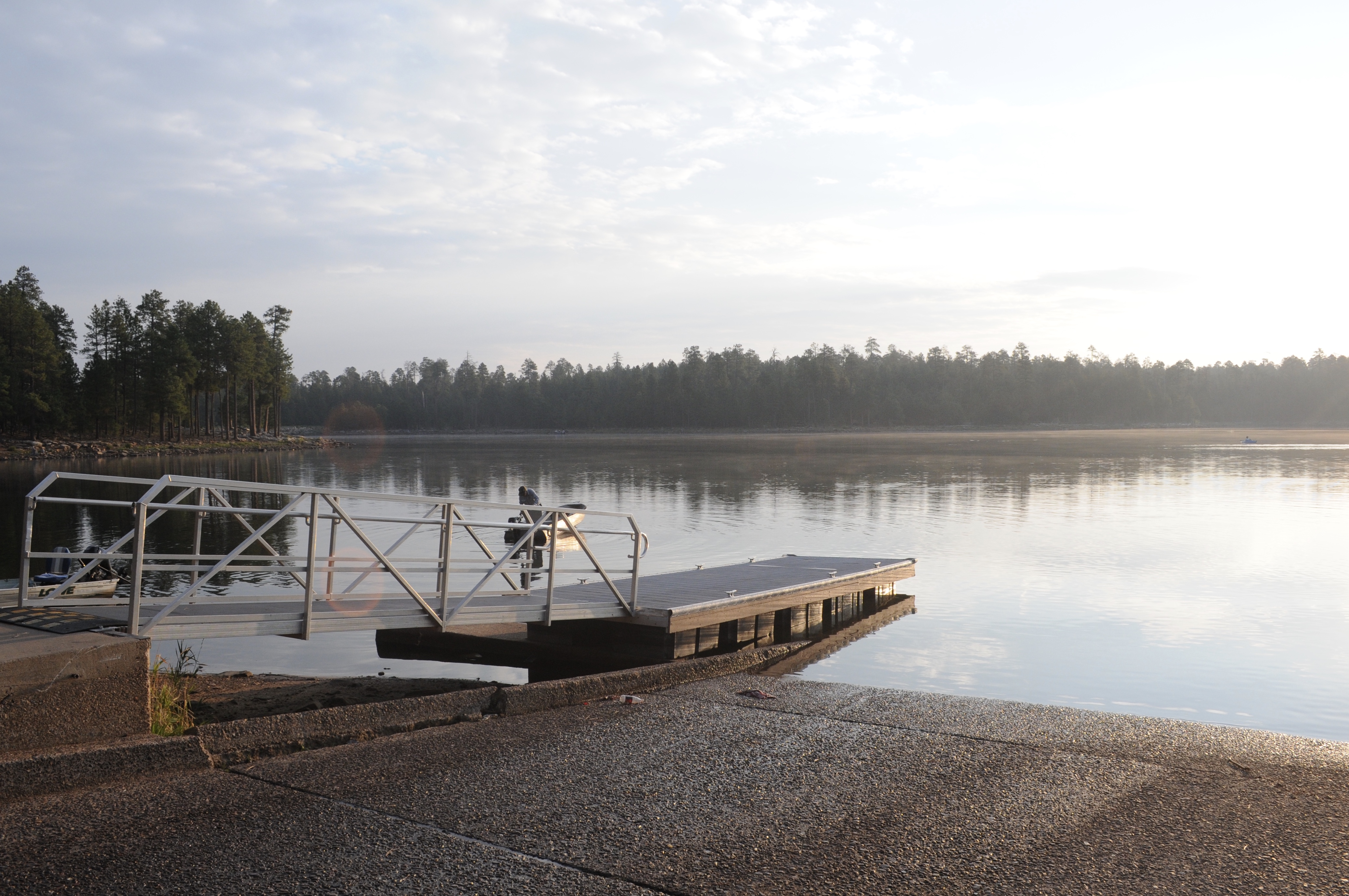
Willow Springs Lake, Arizona - paved boat ramp access

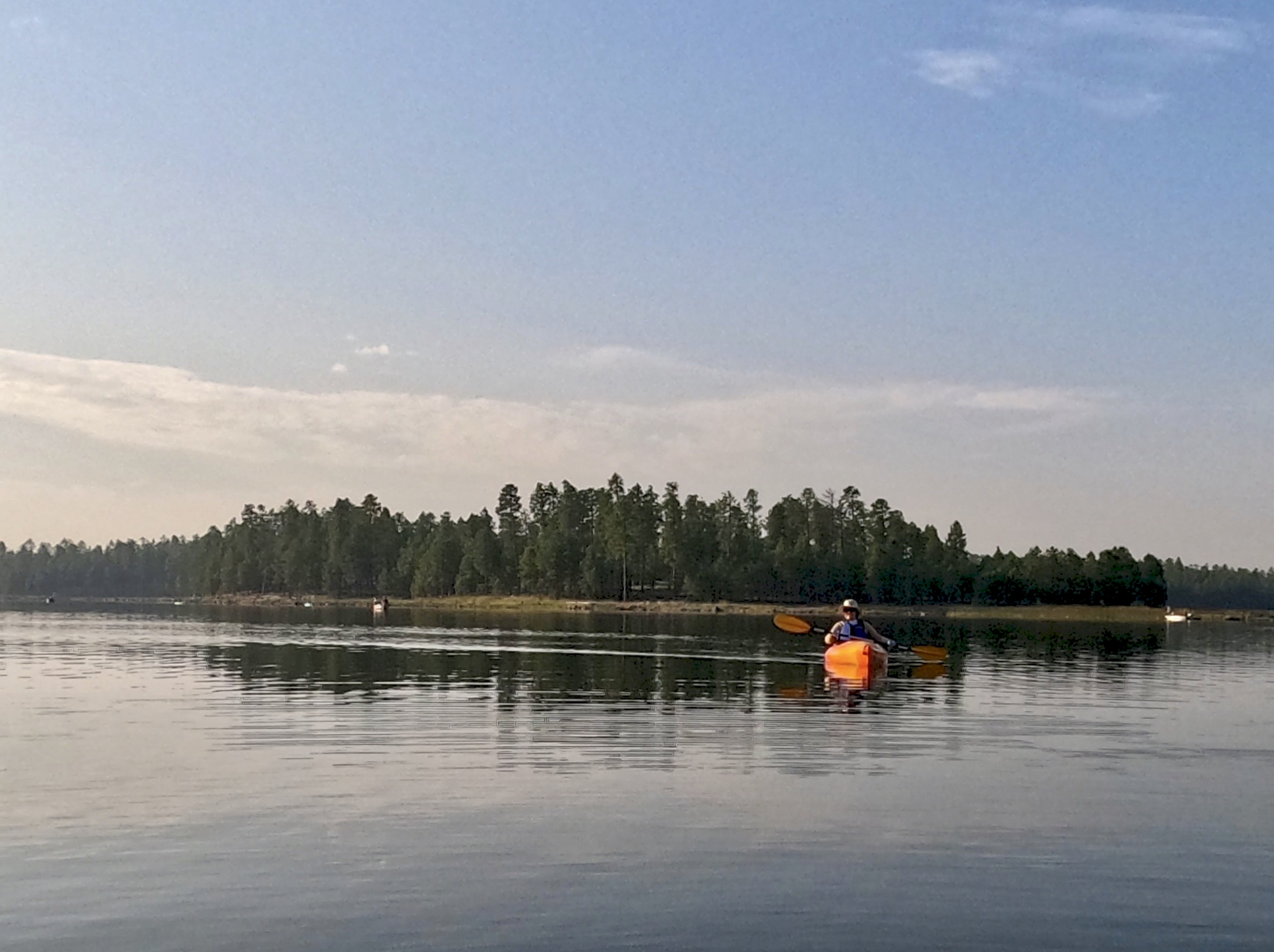
Willow Springs Lake is a popular destination for kayaking

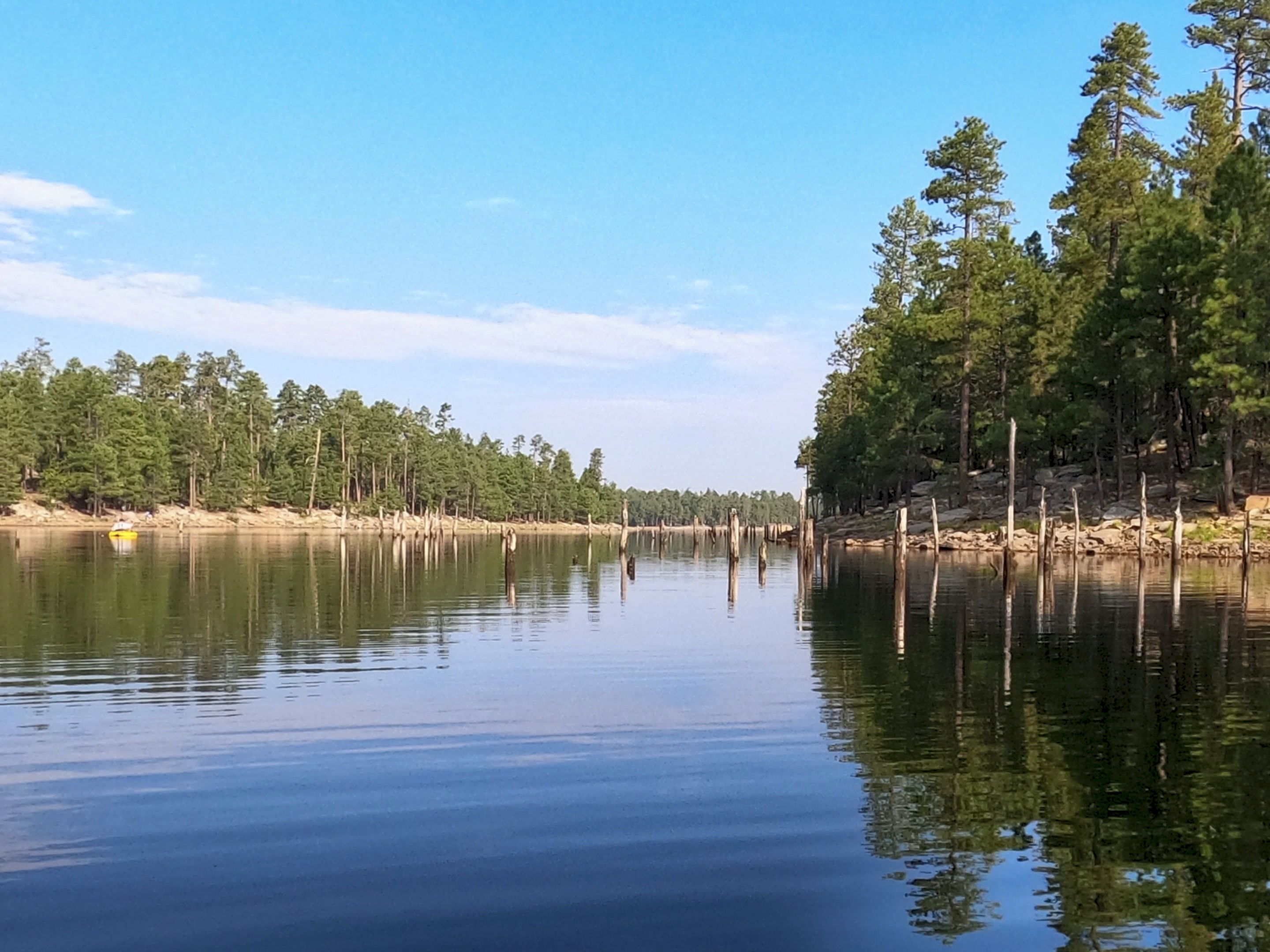
Willow Springs Lake on the Mogollon Rim is also popular for fishing

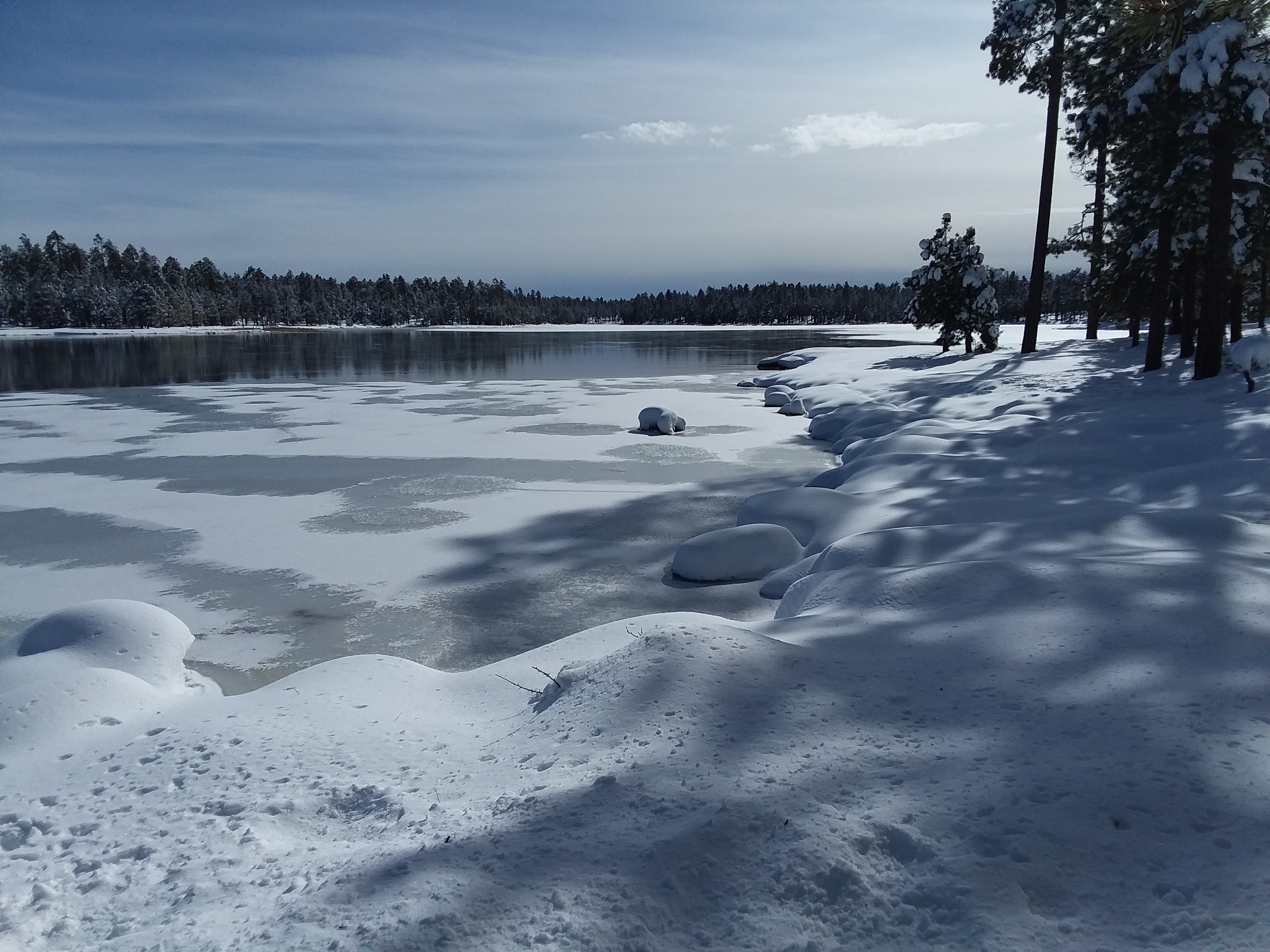
Willow Springs Lake after a snowstorm, despite how it looks it is dangerous to attempt to walk on the ice.

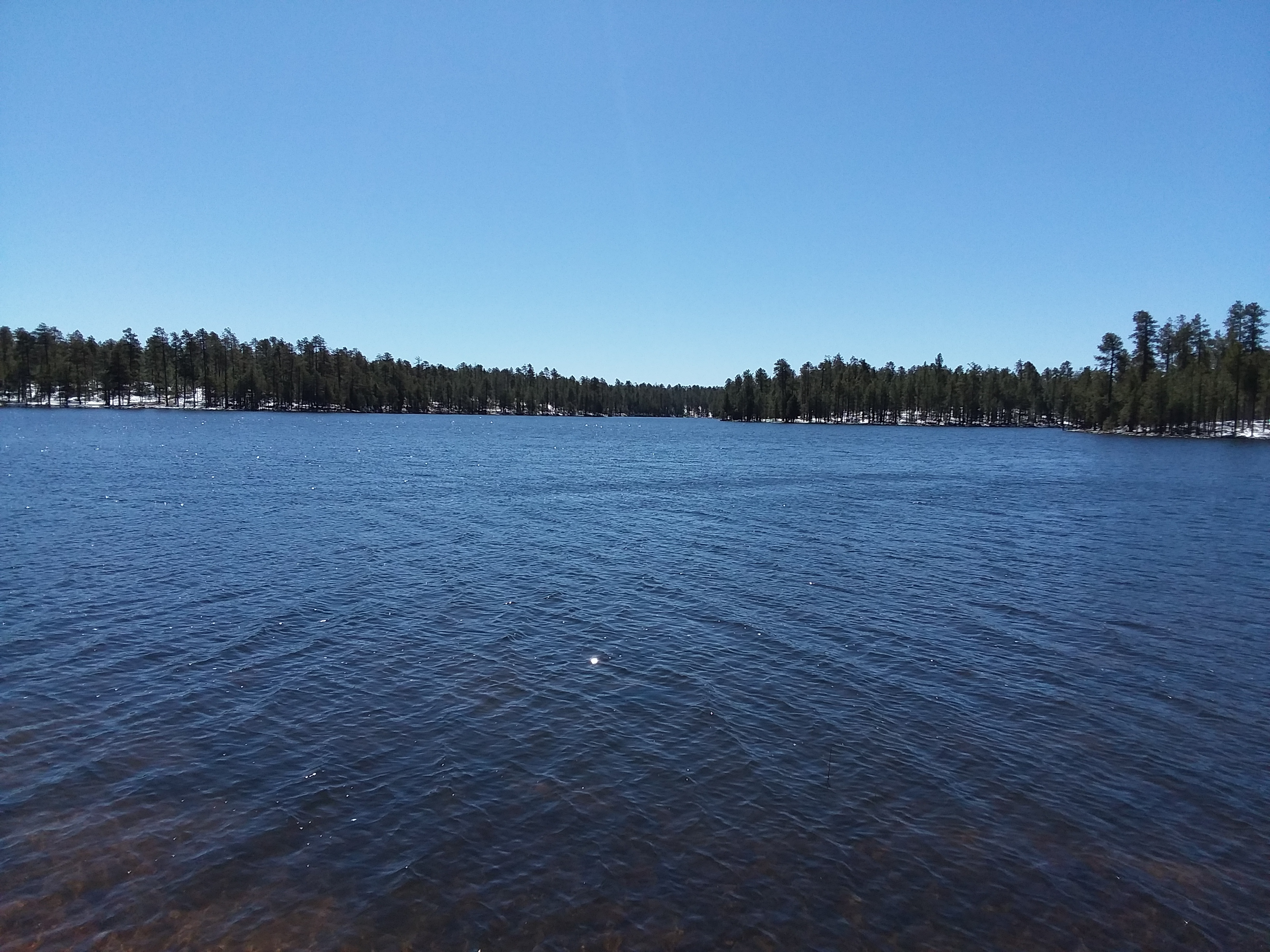
Willow Springs Lake, Mogollon Rim, Arizona in April.
