= Black Mesa National Forest =

Former national forest designation in Arizona

Black Mesa National Forest Reserve
- Location within Arizona

Geography
- Location: Northeastern Arizona, United States
- Coordinates: 34°23′36″N 110°33′26″W
- Area: 1,658,880 acres (671,324.9 ha)

Administration
- Established: 1898

Black Mesa National Forest was established as the Black Mesa Forest Reserve by the United States General Land Office in Arizona on February 22, 1897 with 4,147,200 acres (16,783 km^{2}). After the transfer of federal forests to the U.S. Forest Service in 1905, it became a National Forest on March 4, 1907. On July 1, 1908 the forest was divided among Sitgreaves, Tonto, Apache and Coconino National Forests and the name was discontinued.
