= Horseshoe 2 Fire =

2011 wildfire in southeastern Arizona, USA

Coordinates: 31.82°N 109.211°W

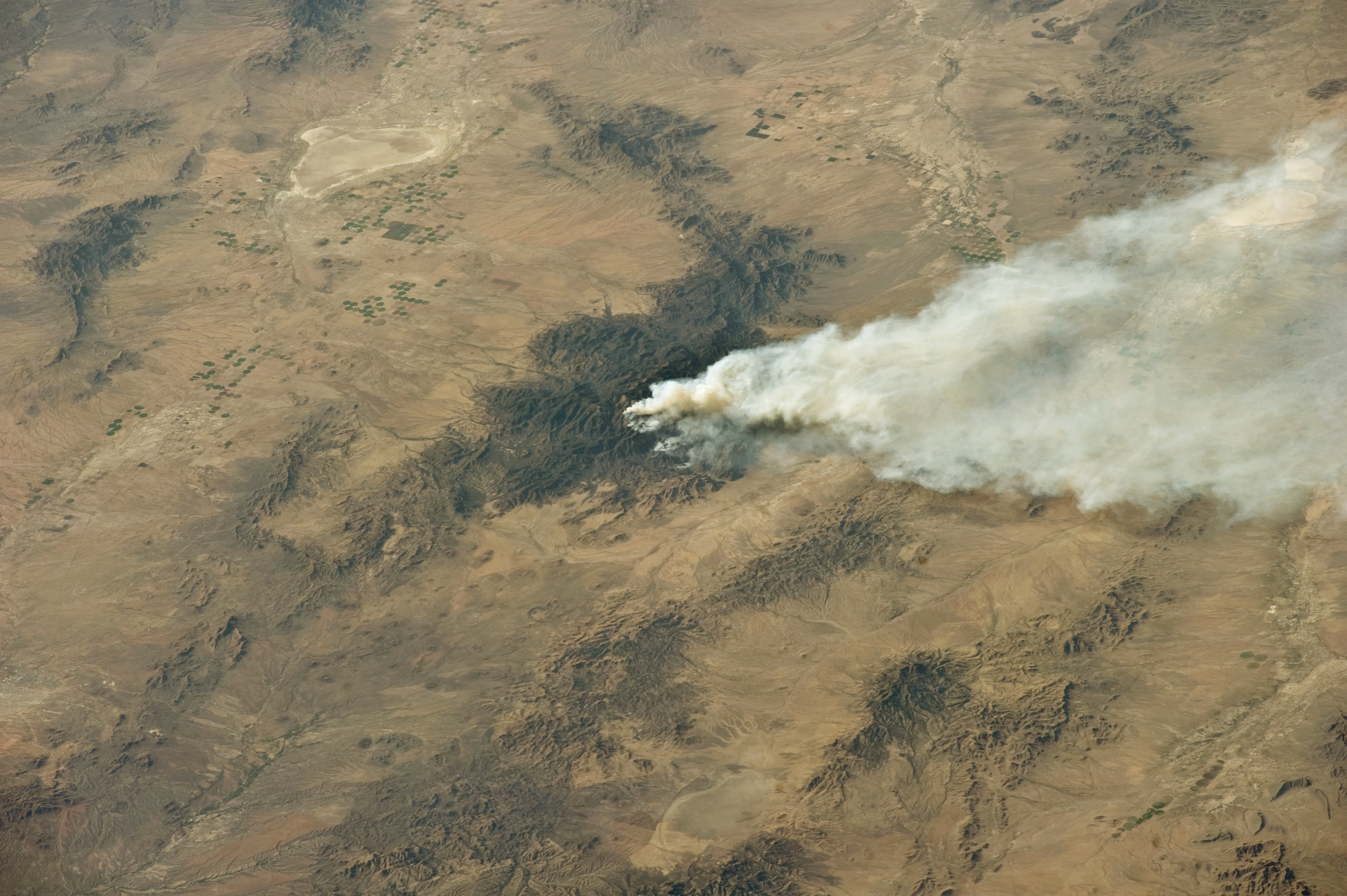
- Photograph of the Horseshoe 2 Fire from space
- Date: May 8, 2011-June 25, 2011
- Location: Arizona

Statistics
- Burned area: 222,954 acres (348.366 sq mi; 90,226 ha) (as of 26 June 2011)
- Land use: forest, wildland/urban interface

Impacts
- Structures lost: 23
- Cost: $50.2 million

Ignition
- Cause: human activities

Map
- Perimeter of Horseshoe 2 Fire (map data)

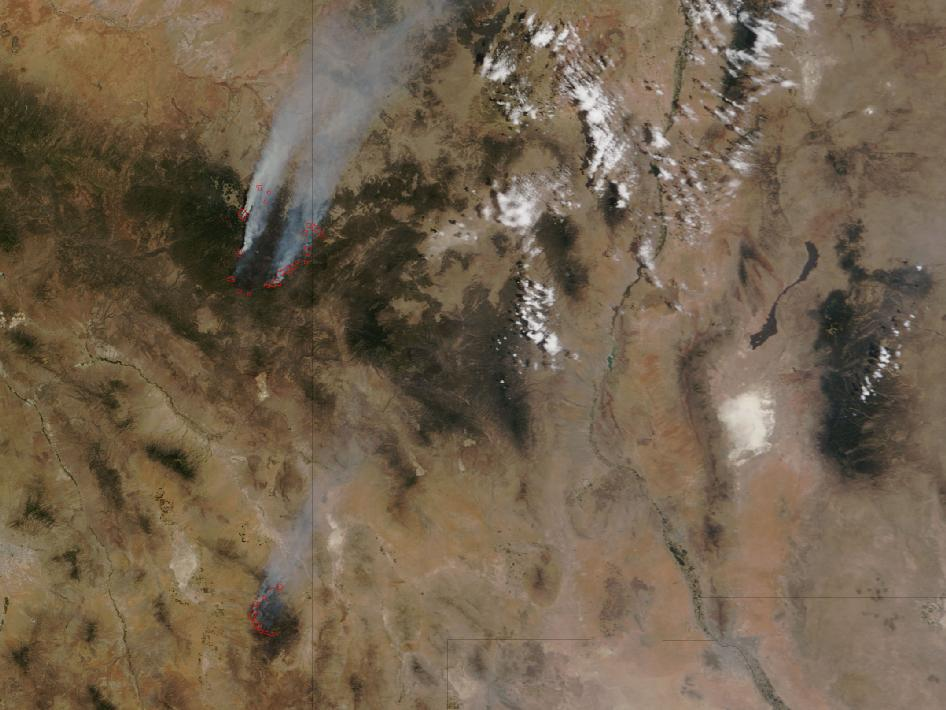
Wallow and Horseshoe Two fires (lower left) on June 12, 2011.

Location within Arizona

The Horseshoe 2 Fire was a 2011 wildfire located along the southeastern flank of the Chiricahua Mountains in southeastern Arizona. It began in Horseshoe Canyon on the Douglas Ranger District of the Coronado National Forest on May 8, 2011, at approximately 11:00 a.m. The fire was started by human activities, and burned over 9,000 acres (14 sq mi; 3,600 ha) in its first day. By June 1, 2011, the fire had burned an area of over 80,500 acres (125.8 sq mi; 32,600 ha) of grasses, shrubs, and trees along the mountain slopes. By June 8, it had grown to 106,661 acres (166.658 sq mi; 43,164 ha). By June 17, the fire was 65% contained and had become the fifth-largest wildfire in Arizona history. 100% containment was achieved on June 25 after a total area of 222,954 acres (348.366 sq mi; 90,226 ha) had burned.

== Post-fire conditions ==
Regions of the Chiricahua Mountains close to the small commonwealth of Portal are experiencing a slow ecological recovery after the Horseshoe 2 fire burned more than 200,000 acres in 2011. Both the biggest draws to the area are intact, but a lot has changed after the fire swept across the rugged mountains. Additionally, because of a mix of flood harm after the fire and infrequent maintenance, trail conditions have changed quickly, and particularly during monsoon season it is necessary to be careful.
