= Apache–Sitgreaves National Forests =

Protected areas in Arizona and New Mexico

Apache–Sitgreaves National Forest
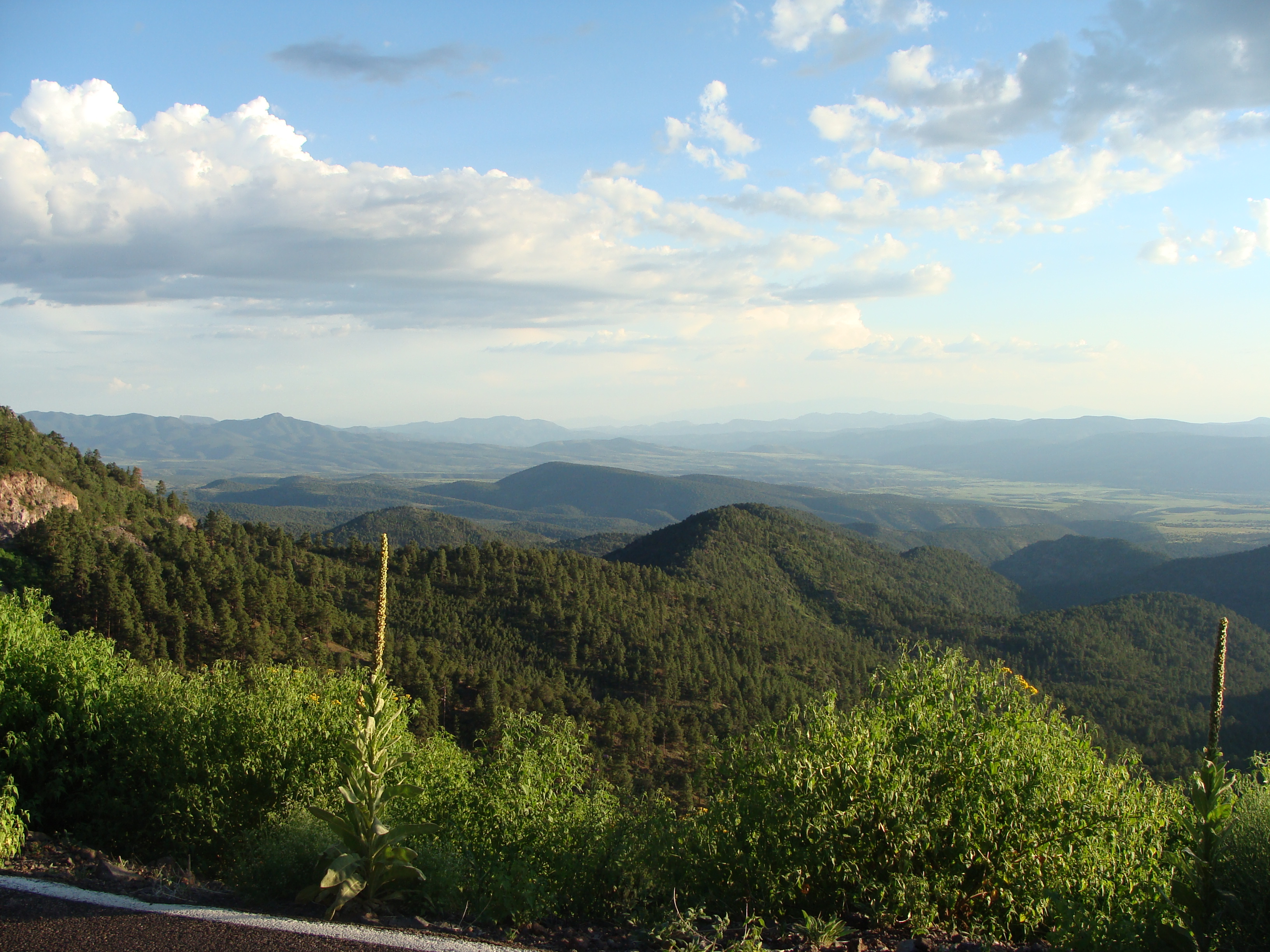

- Location within the United States
- Location: Arizona and New Mexico, United States
- Nearest city: Springerville
- Coordinates: 33°38′N 109°17′W
- Area: 2,761,386 acres (11,174.93 km^{2})
- Governing body: U.S. Forest Service
- Website: Apache–Sitgreaves National Forest

The Apache–Sitgreaves National Forests (Note: Despite being a single entity, the forest is officially known under the term "forests".) is a 2.76-million-acre (11,169 km^{2}) United States national forest which runs along the Mogollon Rim and the White Mountains in east-central Arizona and into the U.S. state of New Mexico. Formerly two forests, it is currently managed as one unit by USDA Forest Service from the Forest Supervisors Office in Springerville, Arizona. Apache–Sitgreaves has over 400 species of wildlife. With its high elevation and cool summer breezes it is a popular weekend destination from the hot desert for Phoenix, Arizona, residents. The forest is divided into 5 Ranger Districts (Clifton, Alpine, Springerville, Lakeside, and Black Mesa) that span almost 300 miles (480 km) from Clifton, Arizona in the east-central portion of Arizona to the eastern boundary of the Coconino National Forest in north-central Arizona. The Apache–Sitgreaves National Forest borders the western and northern borders of the Fort Apache Indian Reservation. It is located in parts of Greenlee, Apache, Navajo, and Coconino counties in eastern and east-central Arizona, and Catron County in western New Mexico. The more northwesterly Sitgreaves National Forest portion lies adjacent to the north side of the Fort Apache Indian Reservation and is located entirely in Arizona, within Navajo, Apache, and Coconino counties. It has a total area of 818,651 acres (3,313 km^{2}). The more southeasterly and much larger Apache National Forest portion lies adjacent to the east side of the Fort Apache and the San Carlos Indian Reservations. It lies on both sides of the border with New Mexico, in Greenlee, Catron, and Apache counties. It has a total area of 1,813,601 acres (7,339 km^{2}).

== Lakes, rivers, and streams ==
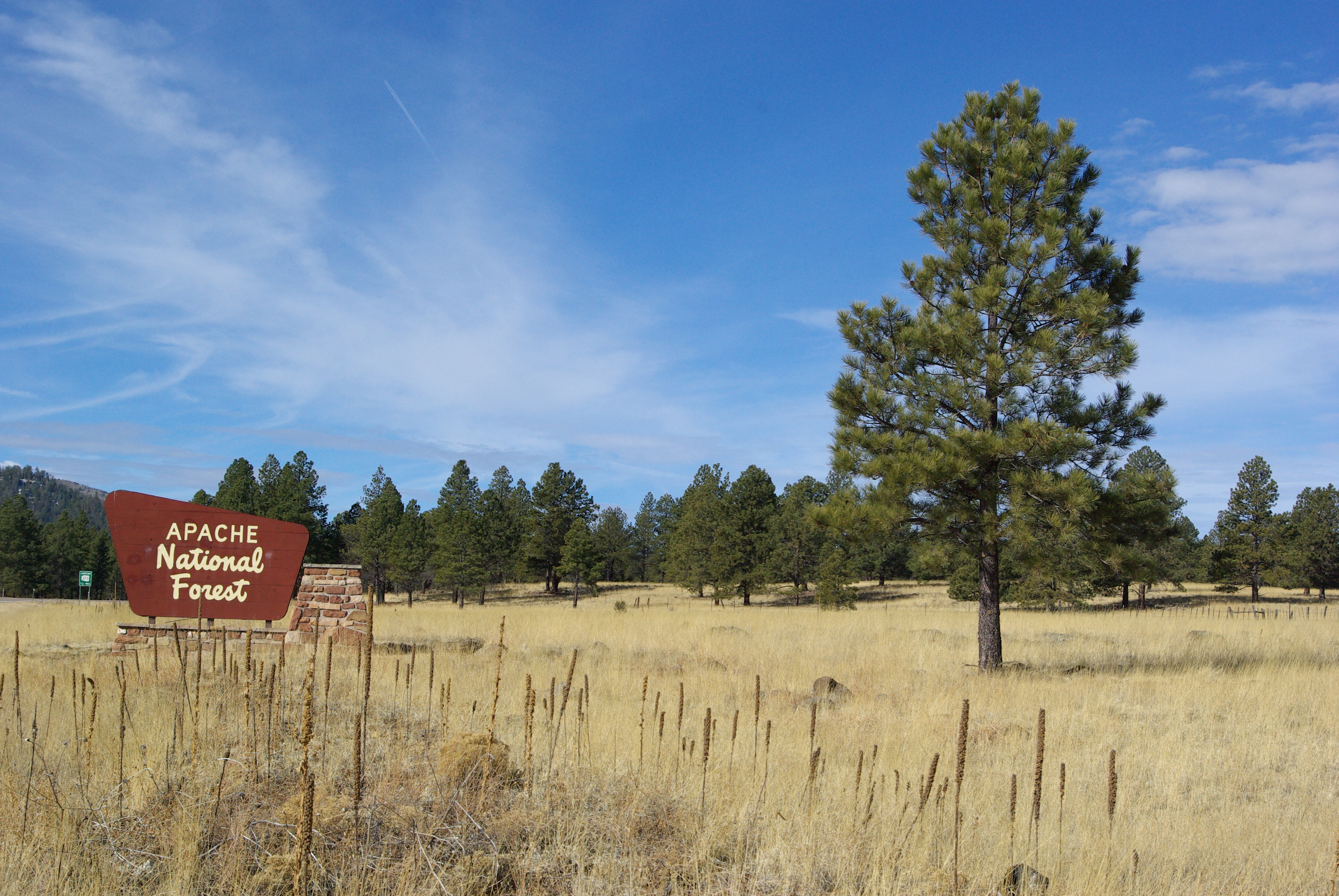
Apache National Forest

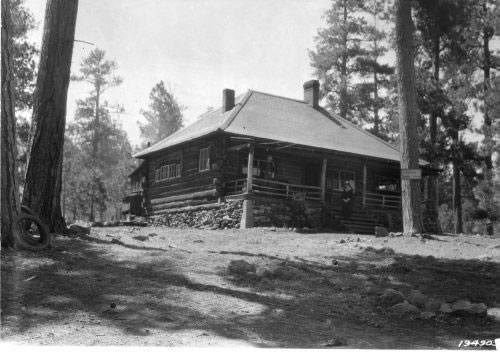
Greer, Arizona, Ranger Station, 1924

Apache–Sitgreaves National Forests has eight notable cold water lakes and boasts numerous lakes and reservoirs and over 680 miles (1094 km) of rivers and streams. The headwaters for the Black, Little Colorado, and San Francisco rivers are in the White Mountains.

- Aker Lake
- Big Lake
- Woods Canyon Lake
- Willow Springs Lake
- Black Canyon Lake
- Chevelon Canyon Lake
- Luna Lake
- Bear Canyon Lake
- Crescent Lake
- Blue River

== Wilderness areas ==
There are four wilderness areas within Apache–Sitgreaves National Forests. All lie within the former Apache National Forest section. Three have been officially designated by Congress as part of the National Wilderness Preservation System.

- Bear Wallow Wilderness
- Escudilla Wilderness
- Mount Baldy Wilderness

The fourth, the Blue Range Primitive Area, was designated as a Primitive Area by the Secretary of Agriculture in 1933. The area has been managed under the highest level of forest service protection to maintain its wilderness qualities. It was recommended that this area be included in the Blue Range Wilderness in 1971, but in 1980 Congress only acted upon an adjacent New Mexico portion within Gila National Forest.

== History ==
About 18 miles southwest of Alpine, Arizona is the Hannagan Meadow area with a lodge, trailheads, and campground. The meadow was named after Robert Hannagan, a miner and cattle rancher from Nevada. One local legend is that Hannagan was chained to a tree near the meadow until his debt of $1,200 was paid off. It was promptly paid by his son, but the name stuck. Another story suggests that Toles Cosper, a rancher from over to Luna, was riding with the young Hannagan when they came across the meadow during the 1870s. They flipped a coin to see which man they would name it after, and Hannagan won.

In 1909, while surveying for US Route 191, John D. Guthrie observed that "there was neither fence nor cabin at Hannagan Meadow." However, with the advent of road construction on the Coronado Trail Road (later Coronado Trail Scenic Byway) tourism became a possibility, and Toles Cosper's son, DeWitt Cosper, built a lodge there in 1926. The Hannagan Meadow Lodge provided rental cabins, single rooms for rent and a general store. As of 2016, the Lodge is still in use.

== Climate ==
Hannagan Meadows has a humid continental climate (Dsb). Summers are typically pleasant, with warm days and cool nights. Winters are moderately cold, with brisk days and chilly nights. Hannagan Meadows has five seasons, with Spring being the driest and Summer being the wettest. The dry part of Summer typically begins at the beginning of June, and lasts into July. The Monsoon season usually begins by mid-July (North American Monsoon) and lasts until the beginning of September, with thunderstorms being very common. Autumn begins during September, and can last to the end of November, with cool – mild days and nights beginning to dip below freezing. Winter usually begins by late November, and lasts until the end of February, but wintry days can be observed during March, and even as late as April, with heavy snowfall being common. Spring usually starts during early March, and lasts well into may, and is usually relatively dry. The highest temperature recorded in Hannagan Meadows is 94 °F (34 °C) and occurred on August 6, 2019. The lowest temperature recorded in Hannagan Meadows is −17 °F (−27 °C) and occurred on January 7, 1989. Interestingly, the highest minimum and the lowest maximum temperatures recorded occurred in the same year, 2011, and are 61 °F (16 °C) for the highest minimum which occurred on September 5, and 6 °F (−14 °C) for the lowest maximum which occurred on February 2. The first and last average freeze dates are June 3 and September 25, giving Hannagan Meadows a growing season of 114 days.

Climate data for Hannagan Meadows (1979–2020)
Month	Jan	Feb	Mar	Apr	May	Jun	Jul	Aug	Sep	Oct	Nov	Dec	Year
Record high °F (°C)	64 (18)	67 (19)	71 (22)	77 (25)	91 (33)	91 (33)	91 (33)	94 (34)	92 (33)	77 (25)	78 (26)	70 (21)	94 (34)
Mean daily maximum °F (°C)	43.2 (6.2)	46 (8)	51.2 (10.7)	55.9 (13.3)	63.5 (17.5)	73.1 (22.8)	73.5 (23.1)	71.2 (21.8)	67.1 (19.5)	58.8 (14.9)	49.4 (9.7)	42.2 (5.7)	57.9 (14.4)
Daily mean °F (°C)	30 (−1)	32.2 (0.1)	36.8 (2.7)	41.5 (5.3)	48.6 (9.2)	57.3 (14.1)	60.2 (15.7)	58.4 (14.7)	53.8 (12.1)	45.1 (7.3)	36.4 (2.4)	29.5 (−1.4)	44.2 (6.8)
Mean daily minimum °F (°C)	16.6 (−8.6)	18.3 (−7.6)	22.2 (−5.4)	27.1 (−2.7)	33.6 (0.9)	41.4 (5.2)	46.8 (8.2)	45.6 (7.6)	40.6 (4.8)	31.5 (−0.3)	23.2 (−4.9)	16.6 (−8.6)	30.3 (−1.0)
Record low °F (°C)	−17 (−27)	−10 (−23)	−7 (−22)	−3 (−19)	14 (−10)	19 (−7)	33 (1)	30 (−1)	22 (−6)	7 (−14)	−5 (−21)	−16 (−27)	−17 (−27)
Average precipitation inches (mm)	3.06 (78)	2.96 (75)	2.56 (65)	1.34 (34)	0.99 (25)	0.75 (19)	4.11 (104)	4.96 (126)	2.87 (73)	2.18 (55)	2.59 (66)	3.27 (83)	31.64 (803)

== See also ==
- List of national forests of the United States
- Travis Walton UFO incident
- Rattlesnake Fire (2018)
