= Woods Canyon Lake =

Reservoir in Coconino County, Arizona

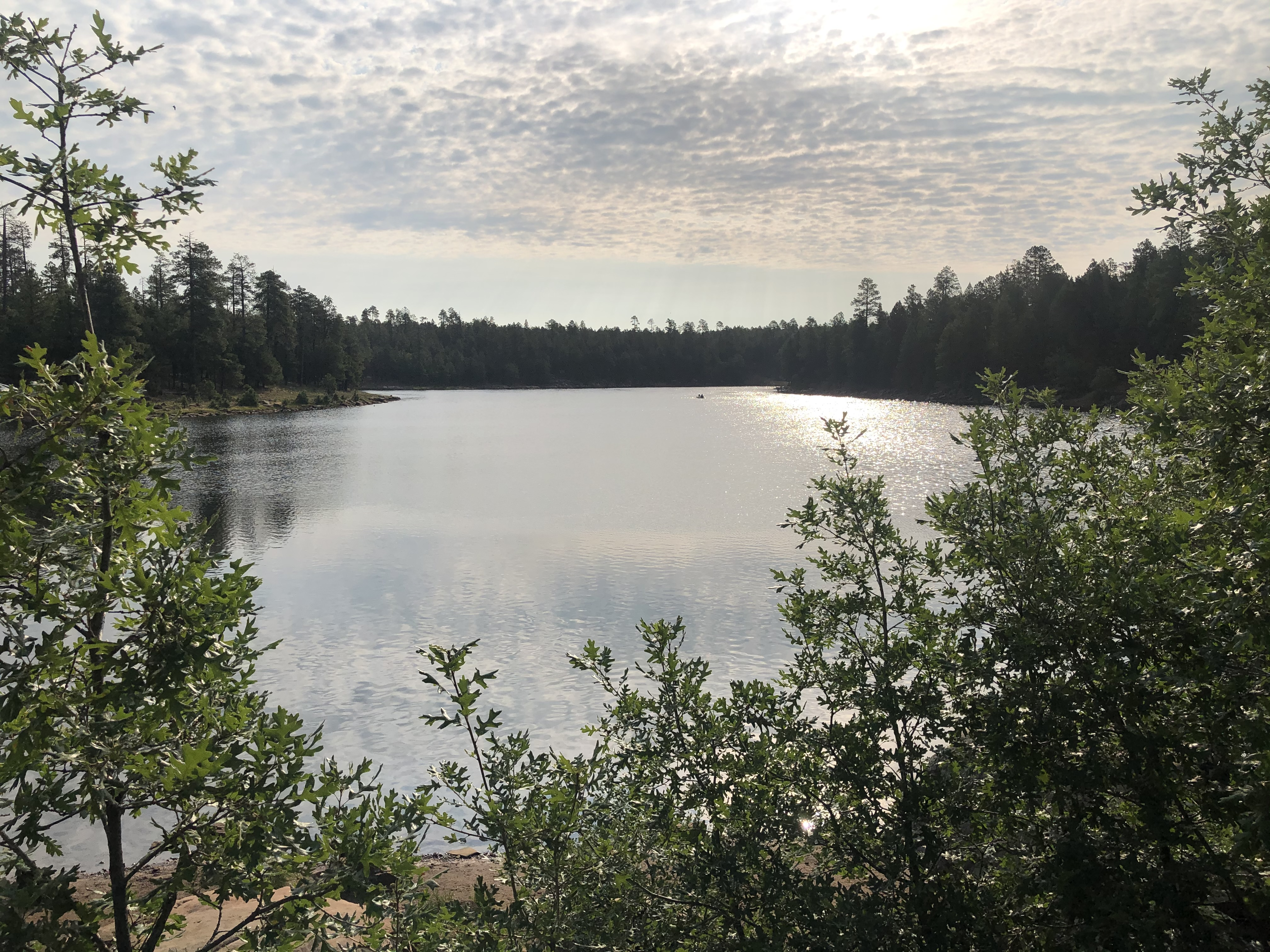

- Location within Arizona
- Location: Coconino County, Arizona, United States
- Coordinates: 34°20′09″N 110°56′38″W
- Type: Reservoir
- Primary inflows: Runoff
- Primary outflows: Woods Canyon Creek
- Basin countries: United States
- Surface area: 55 acres (220,000 m^{2})
- Average depth: 25 ft (7.6 m)
- Max. depth: 40 ft (12 m)
- Surface elevation: 7,505 ft (2,288 m)

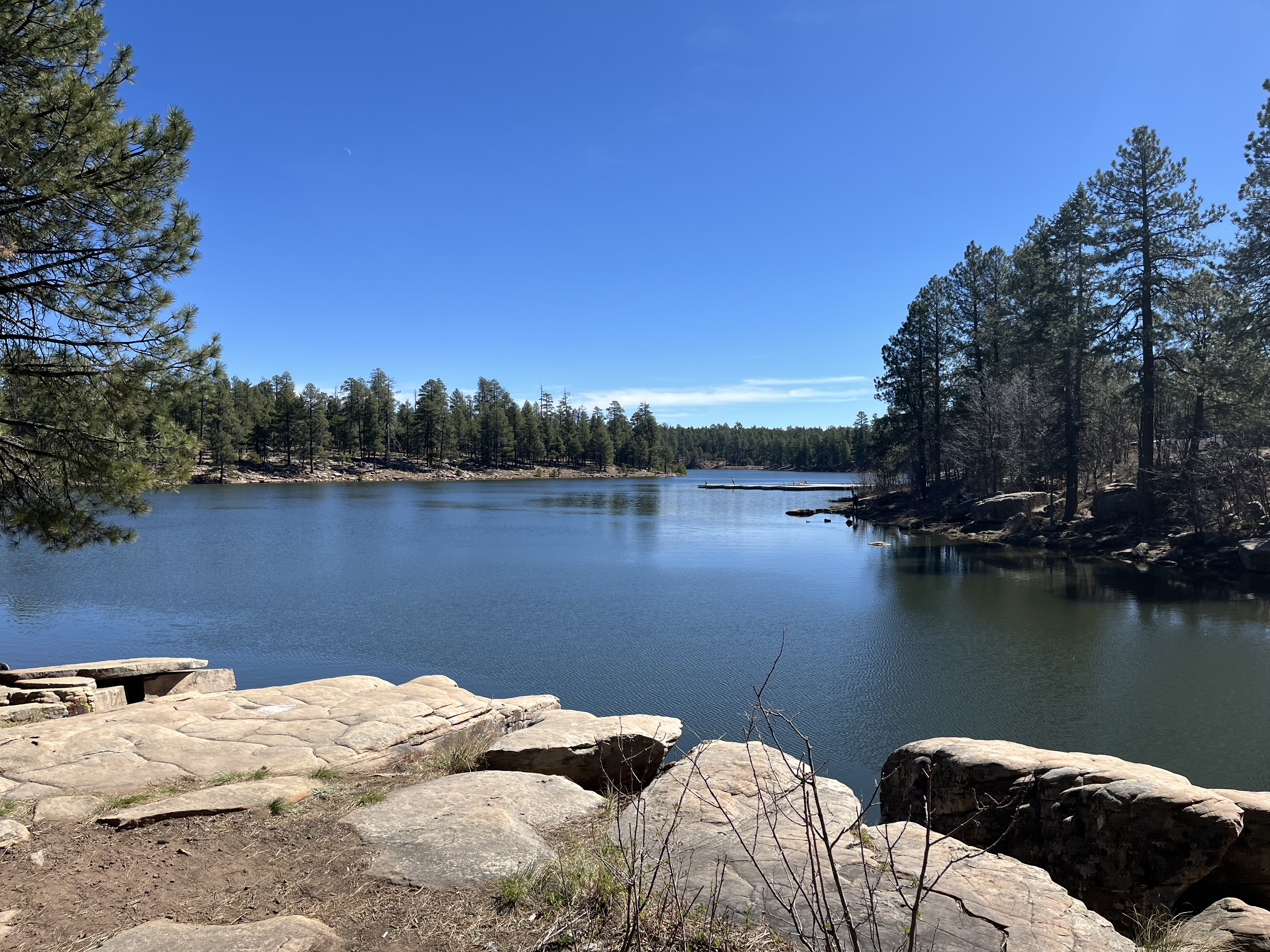
Woods Canyon Lake

Woods Canyon Lake is a small lake located in northern Arizona, United States, about 30 mi (48 km) east of the city of Payson. It is one in a series of small, canyon-bound lakes located on the Mogollon Rim, collectively referred to as the Rim Lakes. It is among the more developed and accessible of the Rim Lakes. It is also the first reservoir on Chevelon Creek, upstream from Chevelon Canyon Lake.

Woods Canyon Lake is small and moderately deep, having an average depth of 25 ft (7.6 m) and a surface area of 55 acres (220,000 m^{2}). The long, narrow lake is formed by an earthen dam impounding the Chevelon Creek in Woods Canyon. It was created primarily for recreational purposes.

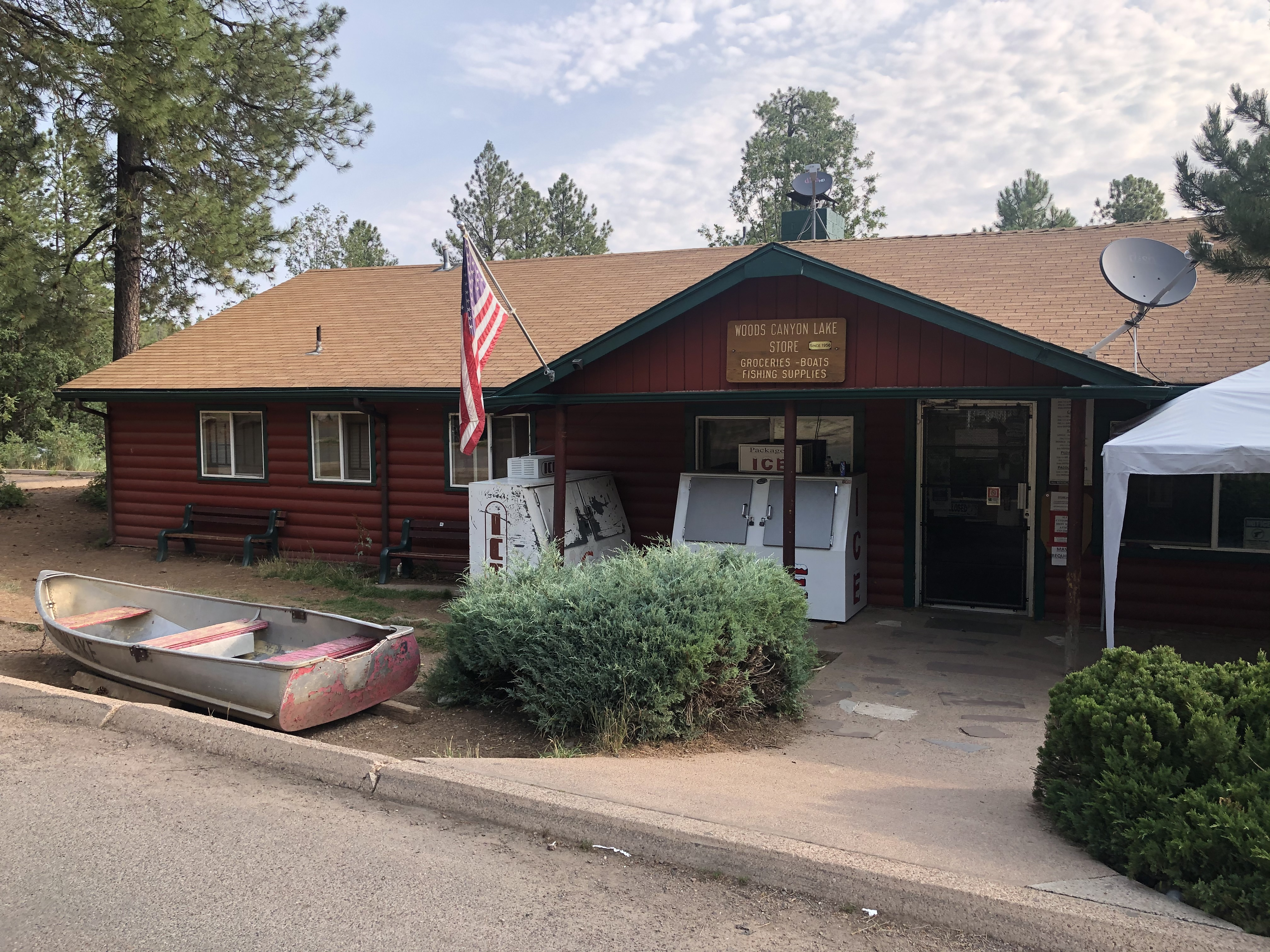
Woods Canyon Lake store

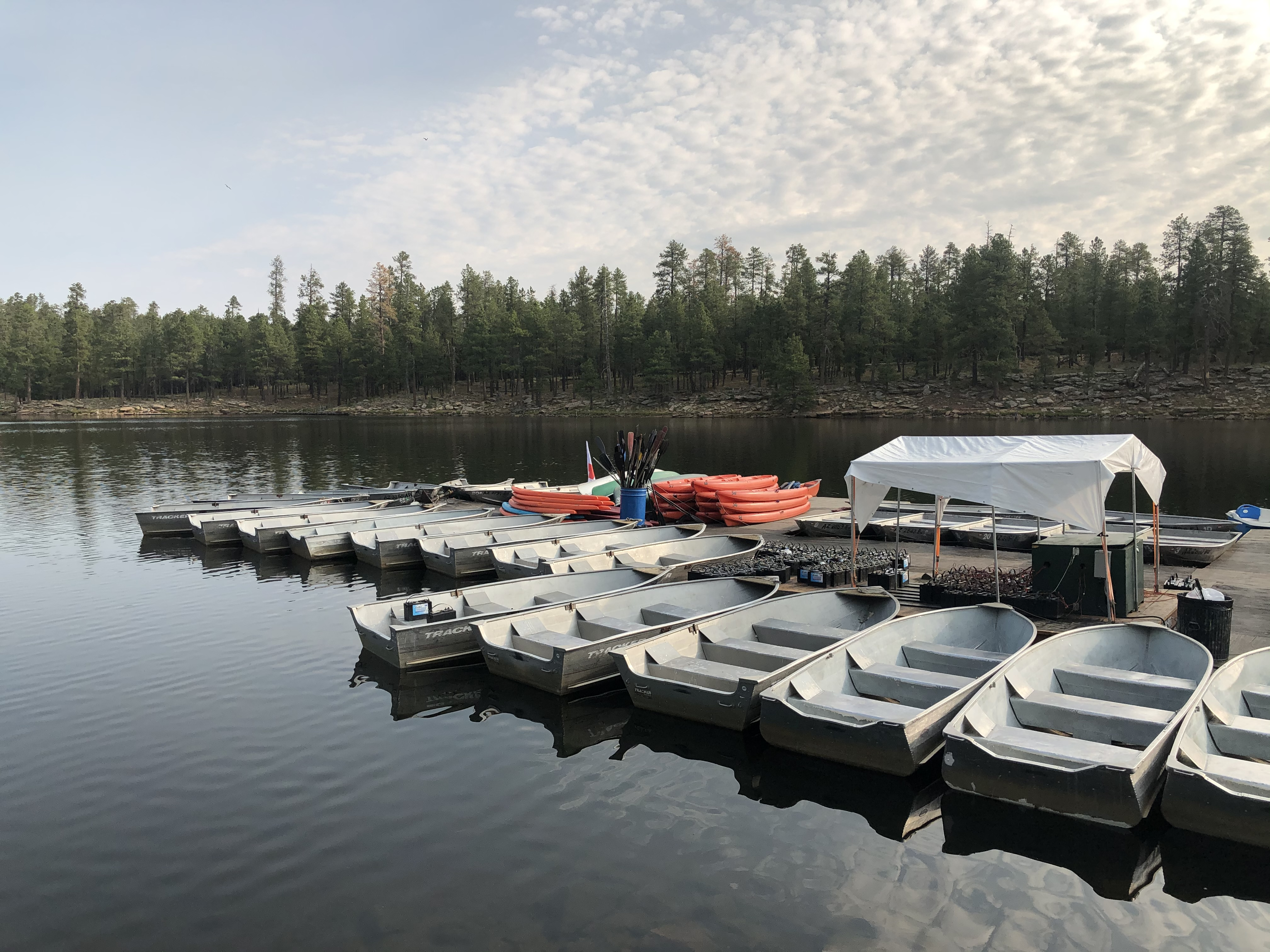
Woods Canyon Lake kayaks, canoes and trolling boats

The lake is accessed via paved forest roads that are open most of the year, although access may be restricted due to snow during winter months from December to April. From April though September the lake is regularly stocked with rainbow trout and tiger trout. A very small self-sustaining brown trout population can also be found in the lake.

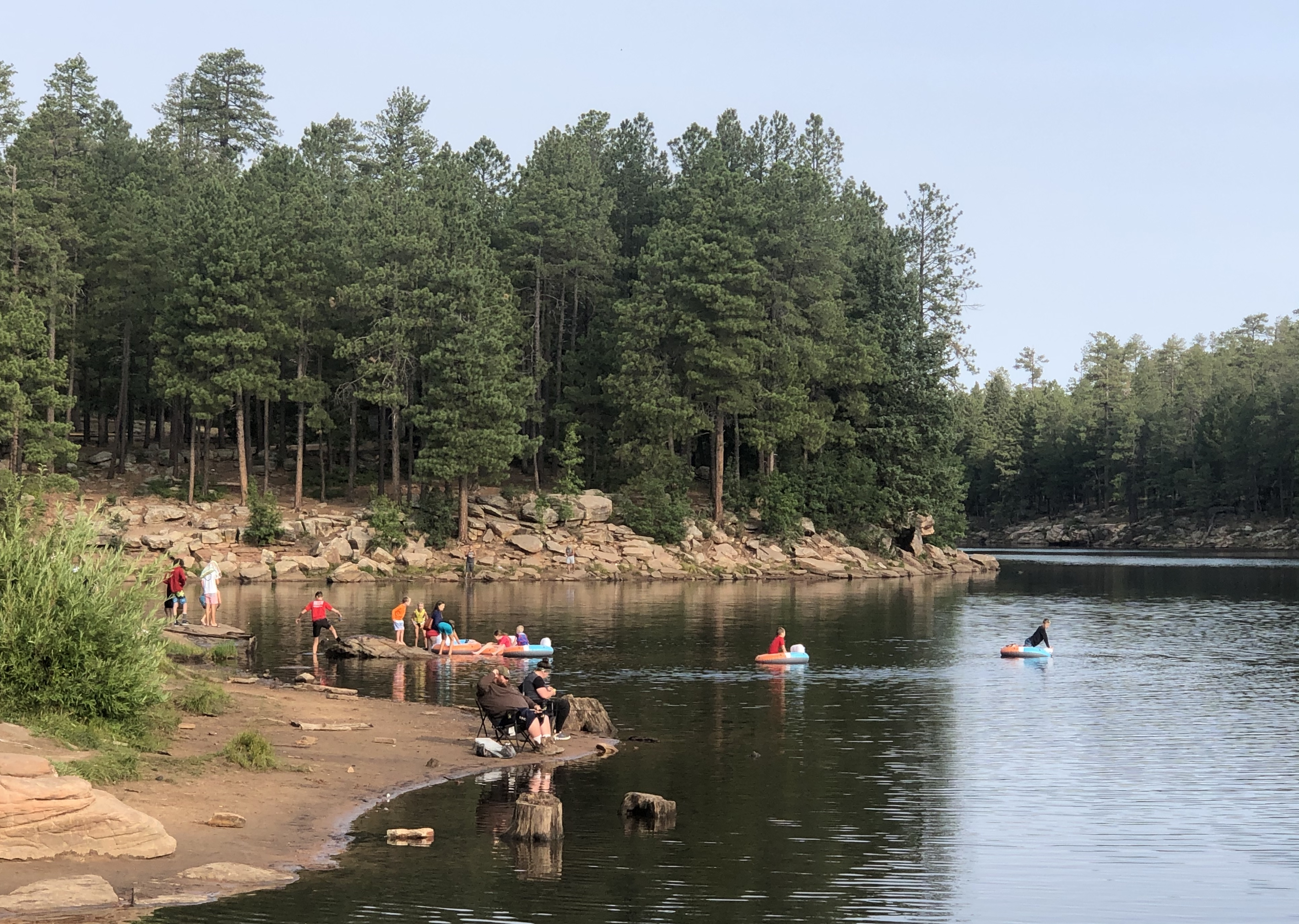
Woods Canyon Lake inner tubing

The lake is well developed, having numerous maintained campsites, facilities for recreational vehicles, and access for boats on the lake. The facilities are maintained by Apache-Sitgreaves National Forests division of the USDA Forest Service.

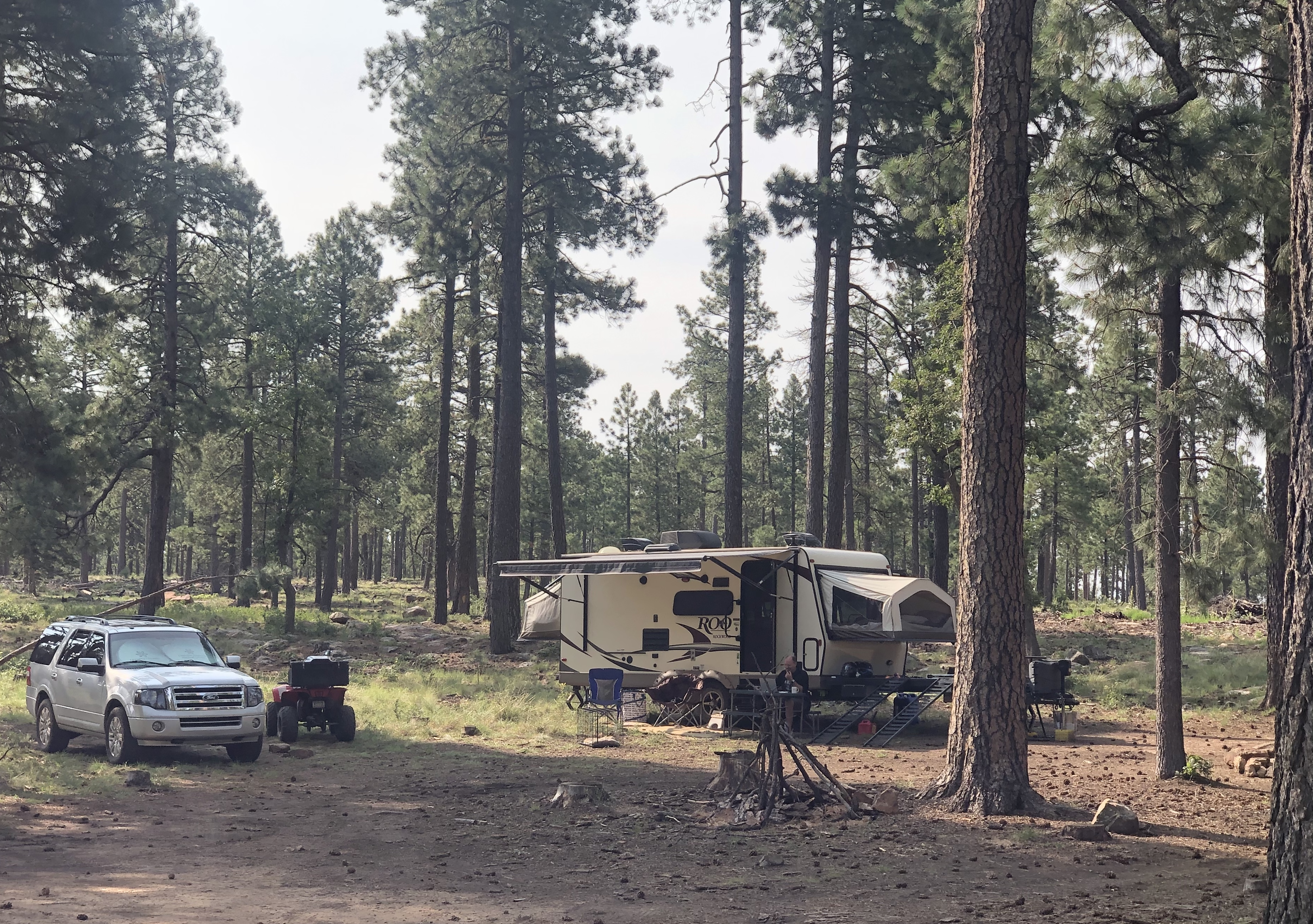
Woods Canyon Lake campground

== Fish species ==
Woods Canyon Lake is stocked with catchable-sized rainbow trout and tiger trout. There is a very small self-sustaining brown trout population that can also be found in the lake. Illegally introduced green sunfish are abundant in the lake. Fathead minnows, crayfish, bluegills and possibly golden shiners reproduce in the lake as well.
