= Sitgreaves National Forest =

Part of the Apache–Sitgreaves National Forests

Coordinates: 34.388548°N 110.6168921°W

Sitgreaves National Forest was established by the U.S. Forest Service in Arizona on July 1, 1908, with 749,084 acres (3,031 km^{2}) from portions of the Black Mesa and Tonto National Forests. In 1974 the entire forest was administratively combined with Apache National Forest to create Apache-Sitgreaves National Forests. The Sitgreaves National Forest is located in the southern parts of Navajo, Coconino, and Apache counties. It had an area of 818,749 acres (3,313 km^{2}) as of 30 September 2008. There are local ranger district offices in Lakeside and Overgaard.

The forest was named after Lorenzo Sitgreaves (d. May 14, 1888). Sitgreaves was a lieutenant who made the first topographical mission across Arizona in 1851.

== See also ==
- Sitgreaves Expedition
- Travis Walton UFO incident
