= Little Colorado River sucker =

Scientific classification
- Domain: Eukaryota
- Kingdom: Animalia
- Phylum: Chordata
- Class: Actinopterygii
- Order: Cypriniformes
- Family: Catostomidae
- Subfamily: Catostominae
- Genus: Catostomus
- Species: "C. sp. 3"

Binomial name
- "Catostomus sp. 3"

Species of fish

The Little Colorado River sucker or Little Colorado sucker ("Catostomus sp.3") is a scientifically undescribed species of North American freshwater fish very similar to the flannelmouth sucker (Catostomus latipinnis) but without the flannelmouth's distinct fleshy lips. The Little Colorado sucker is native to the upper region of the Little Colorado River in Arizona, but was also introduced into the Salt River.

== Description ==
The Little Colorado sucker has a fusiform, chubby body and is harshly two-toned, with dark gray-black topside and whitish-yellow underside (both in adults and juvenile fish). The fish has a thick, deep caudal peduncle (tailside), a large head and an enlarged mouth, with small lower lips. The dorsal fin is slightly hooked and squared. Little Colorado suckers grow up to 50 cm (19.7 in) in length and weight to almost 1.0 kg (2.2 lbs).

== Habitat ==
Little Colorado suckers are usually found in pools with a great amount of cover and shade; also predominant in riffles (a patch of waves). These fish tend to stay in small to medium rivers, or even in smaller bodies of water, such as creeks.

== Diet ==
The Little Colorado sucker usually feeds late in the evening and early in the morning, and spends its time stirring areas of gravel and sand looking for food. The larger adults do the most work, looking for algae, higher vegetation, and mainly, aquatic invertebrates.

== Population and conservation ==
The decreasing numbers of Little Colorado suckers is thought to be because of habitat loss. Due to recent industrial processes such as dam construction, water diversions, and watershed or channel erosion, the distribution of this species continues to decrease; and this considerable downward trend is expected to continue in the future. The only recent attempt at conservation recorded is the maintenance of instream water flows.
