= Apache National Forest =

Former name for Apache–Sitgreaves National Forests

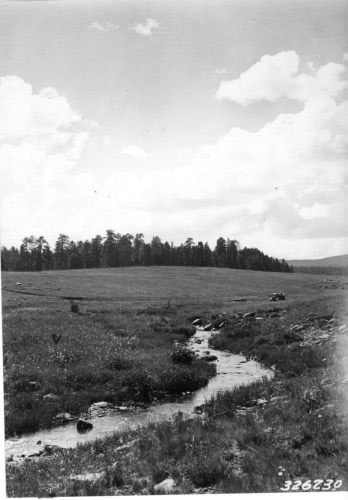
- Reservation Creek in the Apache National Forest (1936)

- Location within Arizona
- Interactive map of Apache National Forest

Geography
- Coordinates: 33°35′00″N 109°05′02″W
- Area: 1,813,601 acres (733,938 ha)

Apache National Forest was established by the U.S. Forest Service in Arizona and New Mexico on July 1, 1908, with 1,302,711 acres (5,271.88 km^{2}) from portions of Black Mesa National Forest. In 1974 the entire forest was administratively combined with Sitgreaves National Forest to create Apache-Sitgreaves National Forests. The New Mexico section is now administered by the Gila National Forest. The area of the former Apache National Forest covers most of Greenlee County, Arizona (excepting the southernmost part of the county), southern Apache County, Arizona, and part of western Catron County, New Mexico. The former Apache is much the larger than the former Sitgreaves. As of 30 September 2008, its area was 1,813,601 acres (733,938 ha), representing 68.9% of the combined Apache–Sitgreaves total area. There are local ranger district offices in Alpine, Clifton, and Springerville. (Springerville is also the headquarters of the combined Apache–Sitgreaves.)

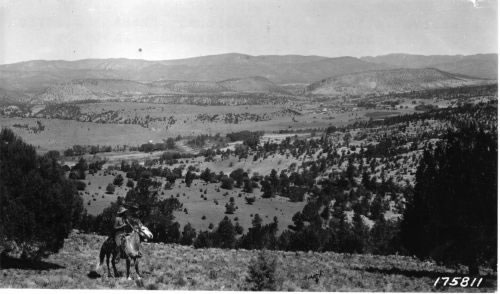
Reservation Valley in the park (1923)

== Wilderness areas ==
There are four wilderness areas within Apache National Forest that are part of the National Wilderness Preservation System:

- Bear Wallow Wilderness
- Blue Range Primitive Area (bordering the Blue Range Wilderness managed by the Gila NF)
- Escudilla Wilderness
- Mount Baldy Wilderness
