= Knoll Lake =

Lake in Coconino County, Arizona

- Location within Arizona Location within the United States
- Location: Coconino County, Arizona, United States
- Coordinates: 34°25′32″N 111°05′17″W
- Basin countries: United States
- Surface area: 75 acres (30 ha)
- Average depth: 50 ft (15 m)
- Surface elevation: 7,340 ft (2,240 m)

Knoll Lake is part of the Blue Ridge Ranger District of the Coconino National Forest. It gets its name from a rocky island located in the middle of the lake. Knoll Lake is located in Leonard Canyon, Arizona, along the Mogollon Rim. This 75-acre (30 ha) lake is located at 7,340 feet (2,240 m) elevation and is closed to visitors in the winter months. Bald eagles may be seen during the winter months if the roads are open late into the season. The facilities are maintained by Coconino National Forest division of the USDA Forest Service.

== Fish species ==
- Rainbow Trout
- Brown Trout
- Brook Trout
