= Bear Canyon Lake =

Reservoir in Coconino County, Arizona

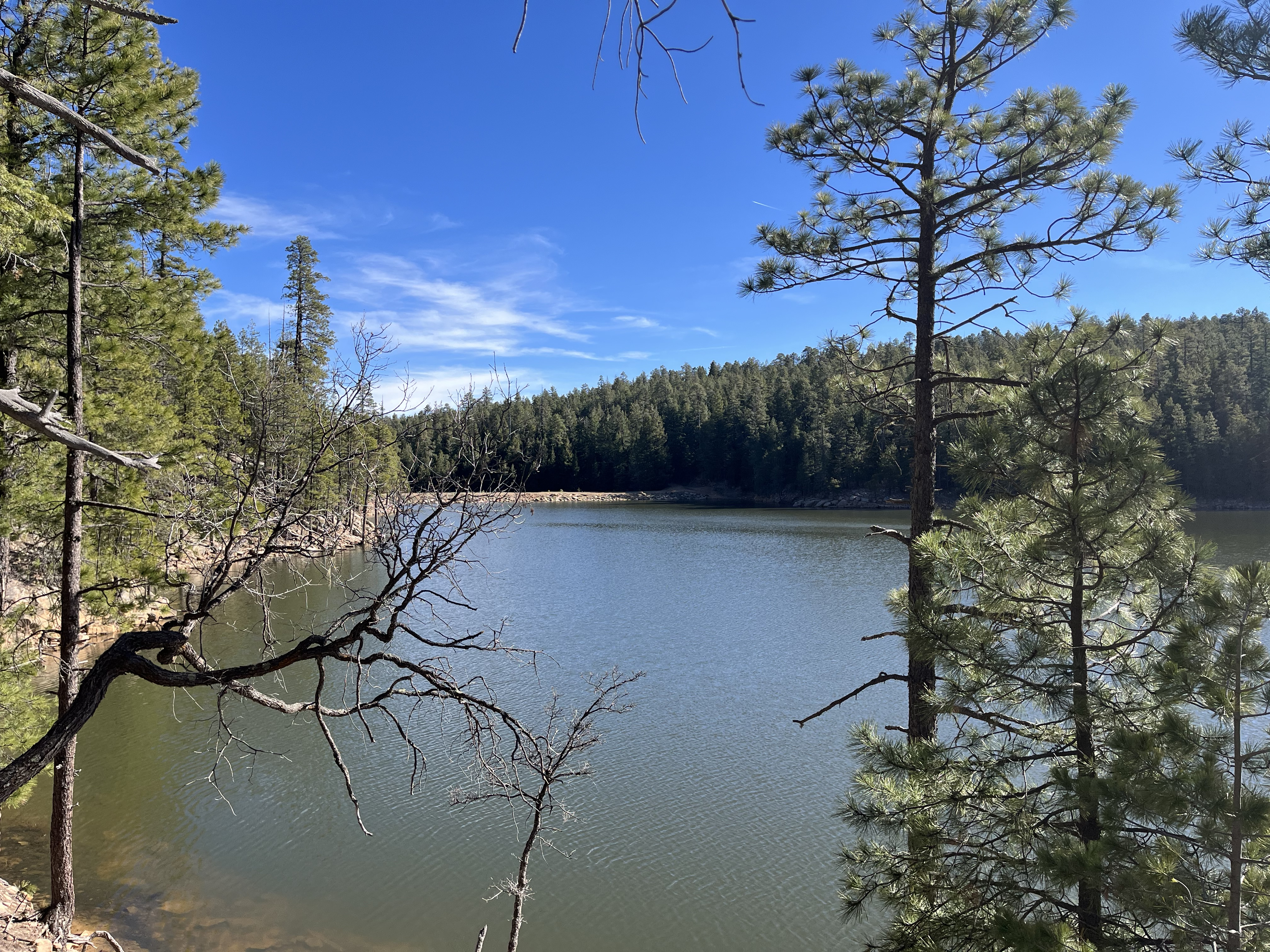

- Location within Arizona Location within the United States
- Location: Coconino County, Arizona, United States
- Coordinates: 34°23′36″N 111°00′12″W
- Basin countries: United States
- Surface area: 60 acres (24 ha)
- Max. depth: 50 ft (15 m)
- Surface elevation: 7,560 ft (2,300 m)

Bear Canyon Lake is a lake built by Arizona Game and Fish Department for angler recreation. The facilities are maintained by Apache-Sitgreaves National Forest division of the USDA Forest Service.

== Location ==
Bear Canyon Lake is located nearly an hour’s drive northeast of Payson, Arizona. Access is restricted in the winter when roads are closed due to snow, generally November to late April.

== Description ==
Bear Canyon Lake consists of 60 acres (24 ha) with a maximum depth of 50 feet (15 m). It lies at 7,560 feet (2,300 m). The Department stocks it with catchable-sized rainbow trout about six times each year.
