= Chevelon Creek =

Stream in Navajo County, Arizona

Coordinates: 34°25′57″N 110°50′36″W

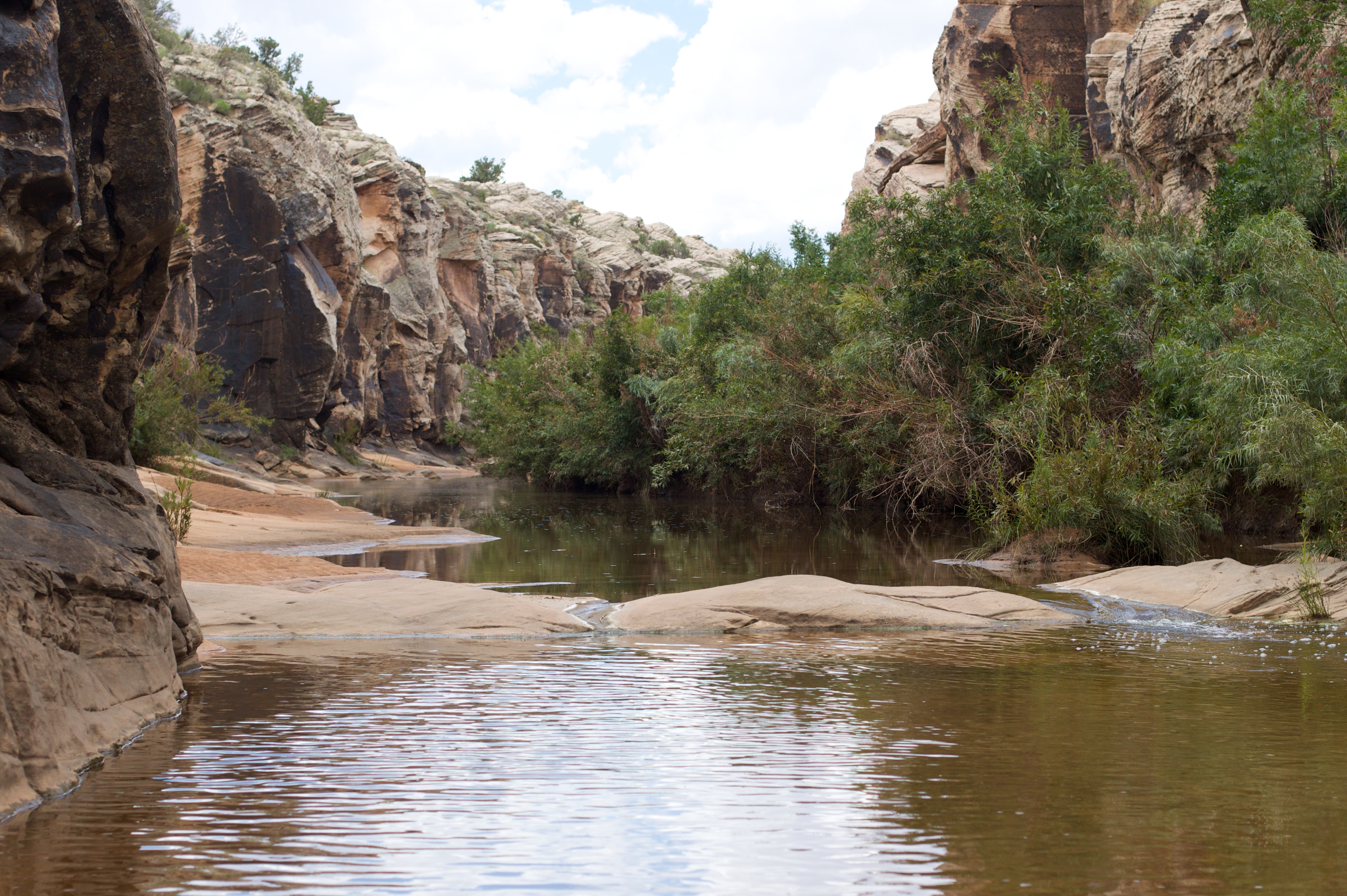

Location
- Country: United States
- State: Arizona

Physical characteristics
- Source
  - elevation: 7,000 ft (2,100 m)
- Mouth
  - elevation: 6,400 ft (2,000 m)

Chevelon Creek is located in the Mogollon Rim area of the state of Arizona. The closest town Heber is 18 miles (29 km) away. The facilities are maintained by Apache–Sitgreaves National Forest division of the USDA Forest Service.

== Crossings ==
There is a bridge at Mormon Crossing, named after the Mormon settlers who abandoned an attempt to start a community there through lack of water.

== Fish species ==
- Rainbow trout
- Brown trout
