= Bear Wallow Wilderness =

Wilderness area in Greenlee County, Arizona

- IUCN category Ib (wilderness area)
- Location within the United States
- Location: Greenlee County, Arizona, U.S.
- Nearest city: Alpine, Arizona
- Coordinates: 33.6022756°N 109.4492507°W
- Area: 11,080 acres (4,480 ha)
- Designated: 1984
- Governing body: United States Forest Service

The Bear Wallow Wilderness is an 11,080-acre (44.8 km^{2}) wilderness area in eastern Arizona in the United States. The wilderness, located in the Apache National Forest, is managed by the U.S. Forest Service. The area has been severely affected by the Wallow Fire of June 2011 which originated there. Bear Wallow Creek provides a habitat for the endemic and threatened Apache trout.

== See also ==
- Wilderness Act
- List of U.S. Wilderness Areas
- List of Arizona Wilderness Areas
