= Blue River (Arizona) =

Stream in the Apache–Sitgreaves National Forest

Coordinates: 33.6656195°N 109.0764359°W

Location
- Country: United States

The Blue River is a 50.8-mile-long (81.8 km) stream that runs through the Apache-Sitgreaves National Forest in Arizona. It arises near Alpine and flows south into the San Francisco River just upstream from Clifton. The Blue River varies in altitude from 6,400 to 4,000 feet (2,000 to 1,200 m).

== Fish species ==
- Rainbow
- Brown
- Channel Catfish

== See also ==
- List of rivers of Arizona
- Blue, Arizona
