= List of Arizona tornadoes =

From 1874 to present day

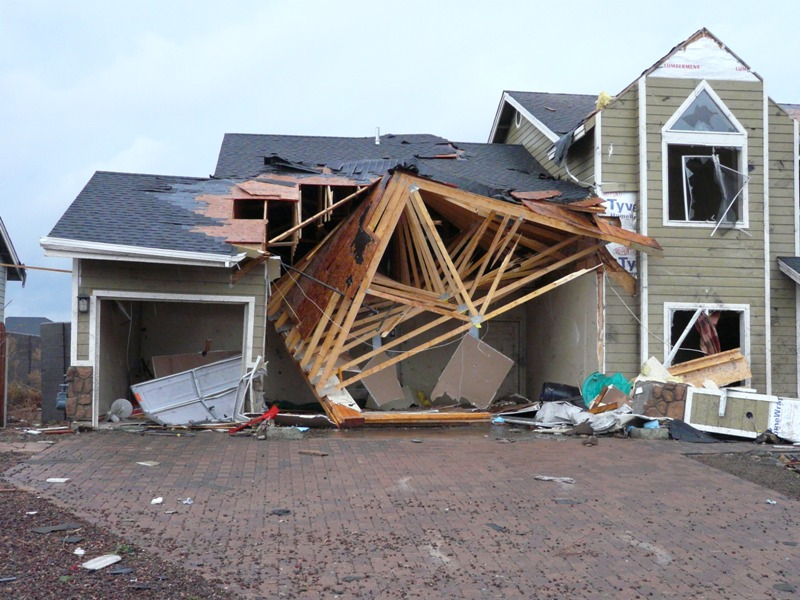
Home damage from an October 2010 tornado in Bellemont, Arizona

The U.S. state of Arizona experiences four tornadoes on average each year. Tornadoes in Arizona are usually weak, F0 to F1 range; EF0 and EF1 range. However, Arizona exceptionally experiences rare significant events. Including at least 4 deadly tornadic events before 1950. The most recent deadly events were in Pima County, where an F2 tornado struck a village near Tucson in 1964, killing two people. The other occurred in 1974, where an F1 tornado struck a trailer park, killing one man and injuring at least 31 people. Arizona has experienced five F/EF3 tornadoes throughout the years, and during October 6, 2010, a tornado outbreak produced two EF3 rated tornadoes and nine other tornadoes. There have been over 300 tornadoes that were reported in Arizona and there are over 150 injuries related to tornadoes in the state. The state's most prolific years were in 1972 and 2010, when the state experienced 15 tornadoes in both years.

== Climatology ==
Tornadoes in Arizona are more likely to happen during monsoon season, which is usually July, August or September. However, tornadoes can still happen in any month in Arizona. Due to the many rural areas of Arizona, its possible that unreported tornadoes have appeared. The most likely tornado to happen in Arizona are non-supercell tornadoes, which is typically a landspout.

== Events ==
=== Pre–1950 ===
- June 9, 1869 – A small but destructive tornado damaged a store in Prescott, while also picking up sticks from a pile and damaging the walls of the stores kitchen and overturning an oven.
- September 28, 1869 – Many residents observed a tornado in Prescott, it was noted that the tornado uprooted timbers.
- April 22, 1874 – A tornado struck California causing damage, it then moved into Yuma County, animals in its path vanished.
- August 23, 1880 – A tornado struck Mohave City near the Nevada border, it lasted for about 5 minutes as it destroyed a business. Four men were killed when the building collapsed and eight more were injured. The tornado then damaged a roof from an adobe and destroyed two more buildings. This remains the first and deadliest tornado to strike Arizona.
- August 18, 1887 – A tornado struck Calabasas in Santa Cruz County, leveling a score of homes, a 2 year old child was killed.
- August 17, 1911 – A tornado struck Winkelman and Hayden in Gila County, killing two people and injuring a boy after damaging over 100 structures.
- April 8, 1926 – An F2 tornado destroyed six small buildings in Maricopa County, one person was injured.
- May 16, 1929 – A small tornado struck south of Yuma County, destroying an unfinished school building. One man was killed and another was injured.

=== 1950–1959 ===
FU	F0	F1	F2	F3	F4	F5	Total
11	3	2	2	1	0	0	19
Injuries: 1

- November 14, 1952 – An unrated tornado struck Yavapai County.
- March 4, 1954 – An unrated tornado struck Pima County.
- August 8, 1954 – An unrated tornado struck Yavapai County.
- June 6, 1955 – An F1 tornado struck Maricopa County causing at least $25.000 in damage.
- July 12, 1956 – An unrated tornado struck Cochise County.
- July 25, 1956 – Two tornadoes struck Maricopa County, the first being an unrated tornado causing $0.25 in property damage. The second being an F0 near Phoenix.
- April 29, 1957 – An unrated tornado struck Apache County.
- August 4, 1957 – An F3 tornado struck west of Sentinel in Maricopa County in a very rural area. The tornado damaged a service station.
- August 18, 1957 – An unrated tornado struck Coconino County.
- August 20, 1957 – An unrated tornado struck Coconino County in Santa Maria Mountains.
- August 29, 1957 – An F0 tornado struck Maricopa County; filling station lost its roof and homes we're damaged.
- March 11, 1958 – An F0 tornado struck Maricopa County, the tornado caused $25.000 in damage.
- March 12, 1958 – An F2 tornado damaged 18 homes North West of Tucson in Pima County; some lost their roofs. The tornado was described as an "inverted cone" with "all kinds of debris, sheet and garbage roaring outside".
- May 11, 1958 – An unrated tornado struck Maricopa County.
- July 24, 1958 – An unrated tornado struck Coconino County. The tornado caused $2.500 in damage.
- September 24, 1958 – An unrated tornado struck Scottsdale in Maricopa County.
- August 17, 1959 – An F2 tornado struck Yuma County injuring one person. The tornado also caused at least $250.000K in damage.
- November 2, 1959 – An F1 tornado struck Yavapai County, causing at least $25.000 in damage.

=== 1960–1969 ===
FU	F0	F1	F2	F3	F4	F5	Total
13	3	8	3	0	0	0	27
Deaths: 2				Injuries: 28			

- June 10, 1960 – An unrated tornado struck Navajo County.
- September 9, 1960 – An unrated tornado struck Pinal County.
- July 22, 1961 – An F1 tornado struck Maricopa County leaving $25k in damage.
- July 27, 1961 – An F1 tornado struck Pima County, injuring one person. The tornado caused at least $250K in damage.
- September 8, 1961 – An F1 tornado struck Maricopa County injuring two people. The tornado caused at least $250.00K in damage.
- July 26, 1962 – An F0 tornado struck Yavapai County.
- October 17, 1962 – Two unrated tornadoes struck the state. The first was in Navajo County. The second was in Apache County.
- July 10, 1963 – An unrated tornado struck Cochise County.
- August 27, 1964 – A short lived and small F2 tornado struck the San Xavier Mission Indian village west of Tucson in Pima County, destroying four homes, a mother and her baby were killed when they were crushed by debris, and nine people were injured. These were the first tornado deaths in Arizona since 1929.
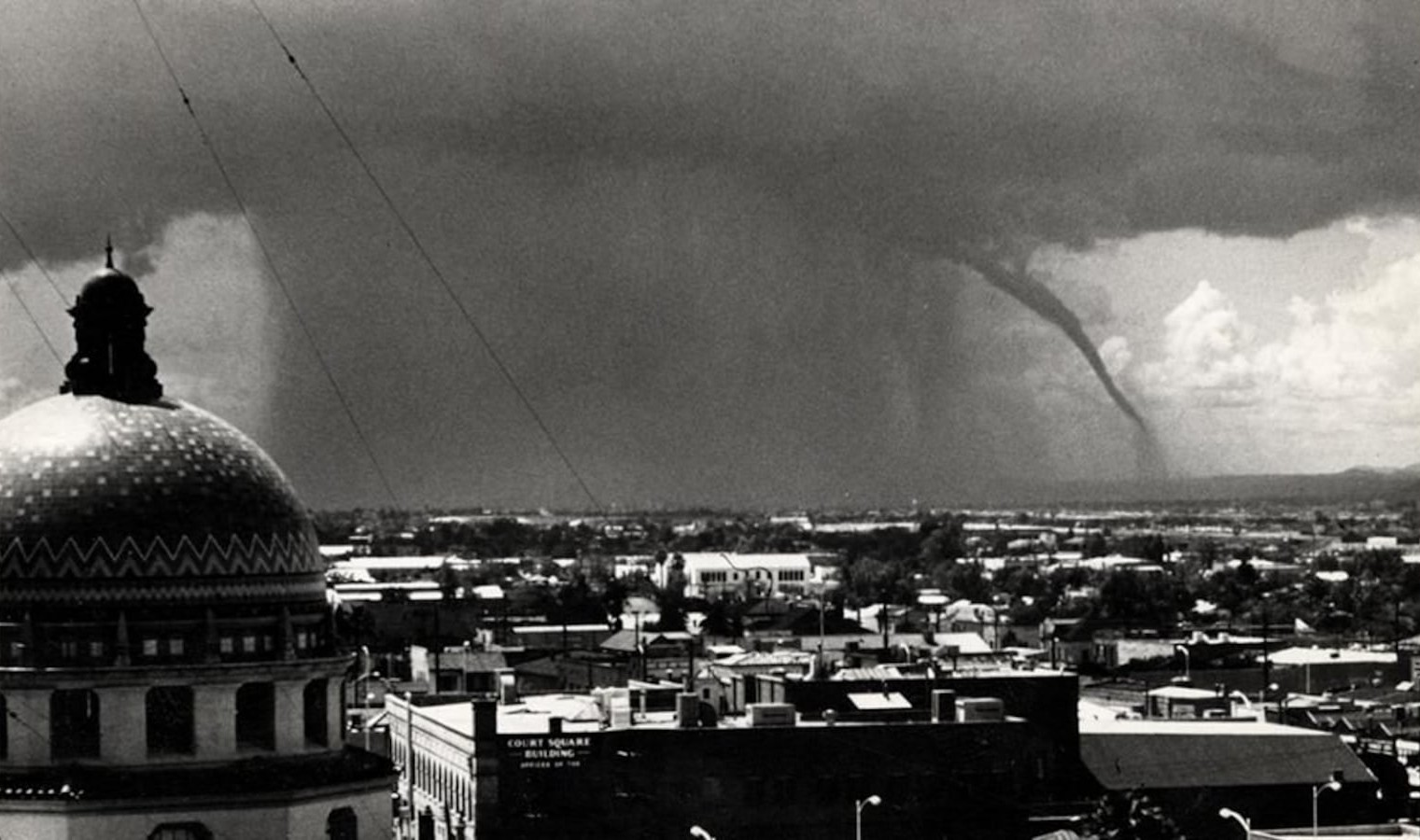
  The tornado that killed two people in the San Xavier Mission west of Tucson.
- September 15, 1964 – An F0 tornado struck Pima County.
- July 27, 1966 – An F1 tornado struck near the Mexico border in Cochise County, causing at least $25.00K in damage.
- July 30, 1966 – An F0 tornado struck Coconino County.
- August 9, 1966 – A small F1 tornado struck trailer courts in Ice House Canyon, south of Globe in Gila County, injuring nine people. The tornado caused at least $25.00K in damage.
- August 31, 1966 – A tornado struck Cochise County.
- September 13, 1966 – An unrated tornado struck Yuma County near the California and Mexico border.
- July 16, 1967 – An F1 tornado struck Pinal County. The tornado caused at least $25.00K in damage.
- July 27, 1967 – A tornado struck Maricopa County.
- August 5, 1967 – A tornado struck Yavapai County.
- August 8, 1967 – A tornado struck Coconino County.
- December 19, 1967 – A tornado struck Maricopa County.
- July 4, 1968 – An F2 tornado struck Maricopa County injuring two people. The tornado caused at least $25.00K in damage.
- July 20, 1968 – Two tornadoes touched down across the state, the first was an unrated tornado struck Coconino County. The second was an F1 which injured 3 people in Maricopa County.
- October 3, 1968 – An F2 tornado struck Maricopa County. Injuring three people and leaving $250.00K in damage.
- November 1, 1968 – An unrated tornado struck Coconino County.
- February 22, 1969 – An unrated tornado struck Maricopa County.
- August 1, 1969 – Two tornadoes touched down in the state, the first was a F1 that struck Maricopa County injuring 2 people. The second was a F0 that struck Pima County.
- August 16, 1969 – An F1 tornado struck Pima County. The tornado caused at least $250.00K in damage.

=== 1970–1979 ===
FU	F0	F1	F2	F3	F4	F5	Total
9	15	18	3	2	0	0	46
Deaths: 1				Injuries: 105			

- July 19, 1970 – A tornado struck Maricopa County.
- August 8, 1970 – A tornado struck Pinal County.
- September 9, 1970 – An F1 tornado struck Maricopa County causing $25.00K in property damage.
- July 16, 1971 – An F1 tornado struck Cochise County, injuring 2 people. The tornado caused $25.00K in damage.
- July 17, 1971 – An F1 tornado struck Cochise County, causing at least $25.00K in damage.
- August 30, 1971 – An F2 tornado struck Tempe in Maricopa County damaging roofs, homes and trees. The tornado also destroyed 25 trailers. 41 people we're injured due to flying glass. The tornado caused at least $3.000M in damage.
- September 1, 1971 – Two F1 tornadoes touched down in the state. The first struck Pima County. The second struck Pinal County, this tornado caused $250.00K in damage.
- September 14, 1971 – An F2 tornado struck Maricopa County. The tornado caused $25.00K in damage.
- October 18, 1971 – An F1 tornado struck Maricopa County. The tornado caused $25.00K in damage.
- June 13, 1972 – An F0 struck Maricopa County. The tornado caused $25.00K in damage.
- June 21, 1972 – Six tornadoes touched down across the state. The first was an F0 that struck Pinal County. The second was an F1 that struck Pinal County injuring five people, the tornado damaged house trailers, trees, businesses and leaving $205k in damage. The third was an F0 that struck Pinal County. The fourth was an F0 that struck Maricopa County. The fifth tornado was a "well-developed" F3 that struck Eloy in Pinal County, injuring 18 people, including five that were hospitalized. The tornado completely destroyed two mobile homes and severely damaged other buildings. The sixth tornado was an F2 that struck Maricopa County injuring three people. The tornado damaged at least 100 homes and some mobile homes, it was stated that "twin funnels were involved". This was the first damaging and significant tornado outbreak in Arizona.
- July 23, 1972 – An F0 tornado struck Maricopa County.
- August 8, 1972 – An F3 tornado struck 11 miles North East of Kingman in Apache County. The 300 yard twister touched the ground for one hour and was followed by a hailstorm.
- August 10, 1972 – Two tornadoes briefly touched down in the state, the first was an F1 that struck northwest of Chino Valley in Yavapai County, the other was an unrated twister that struck northeast of the same county, they were in uninhabited areas.
- August 12, 1972 – A small F1 tornado briefly touched the ground south of phoenix in an unpopulated area.
- September 9, 1972 – An F0 tornado struck Cochise County.
- September 10, 1972 – An F1 tornado touched down in Maricopa County; three homes lost their roofs entirely and many more were damaged. A young girl was cut by flying glass and caused $2.500M in damage. While the tornado is officially rated as an F1, tornado expert Thomas P. Grazulis rated the tornado as an F2.
- September 18, 1972 – Two tornadoes hit the state, the first was a F1 tornado that struck Mohave County, injuring one person and leaving $250.00K in damage. The second was a F1 that struck Yuma County leaving $25.00K in damage.
- October 4, 1972 – An F0 tornado struck Yuma County.
- October 18, 1972 – An F1 tornado struck Pinal County, with a width of 1,000 yd (910 m), the tornado caused $25.00K in damage.
- April 20, 1973 – A short lived F0 tornado struck Navajo County.
- August 2, 1973 – An F0 tornado struck near Prescott in Yavapai County, the tornado moved across a lake shortly becoming a waterspout and quickly dissipated after making landfall.
- June 23, 1974 – Two tornadoes touched down in the state, the first was an F1 that struck southwest of Downtown Tucson in Pima County, killing a man and injuring 31 people after demolishing 19 mobile homes and severely damaging 33 more, leaving $250k in damage. While the tornado is officially rated as an F1, tornado expert Thomas P. Grazulis rated the tornado as an F2. The second tornado was an F0 that struck Tucson in Pima County.
- June 24, 1974 – An F0 tornado struck west of Douglas in Cochise County.
- July 25, 1974 – An F0 struck Kearny in Pinal County. The tornado caused $25.00K in damage.
- August 8, 1974 – A small F1 tornado was reported by a pilot. It struck Mohave County.
- August 24, 1974 – A small F1 tornado struck Maricopa County, destroying a storage shed and leaving $2.5K in damage.
- October 23, 1974 – Two F1 tornadoes hit the state. The first touched down twice in San Manuel in Pinal County. The second tornado struck Pinal County, Arizona.
- October 27, 1974 – An F0 tornado briefly touched down in Petrified Forest National Park in Apache County.
- December 23, 1975 – An F1 tornado struck a rural area in Pima County, Arizona.
- May 4, 1976 – There was an outbreak of three tornadoes and all three struck Maricopa County. The first was a F0 that struck Scottsdale, the tornado had a length of 2 miles (3.2 km). Shortly after the tornado dissipated, an F1 tornado struck the desert in Mesa, the tornado was covered in dust and quickly dissipated when it entered a citrus grove. Approximately 48 minutes later, an F0 tornado briefly touched down in Fountain Hills.
- July 6, 1976 – An F0 tornado struck Seligman in Yavapai County.
- August 12, 1976 – An F1 tornado struck Colorado City in Mohave County. The tornado unroofed a hay shelter and lifted a house under construction. The tornado caused approximately $2.5K in damage.
- March 25, 1977 – An F1 tornado struck Maricopa County.
- July 19, 1977 – A tornado struck Ash Fork in Yavapai County, the tornado had a path length of 0.5 miles (0.80 km).
- February 10, 1978 – Two tornadoes briefly touched down in Yuma County.
- March 14, 1979 – A tornado struck Mohave County, injuring three people and leaving $25K in damage.
- August 14, 1979 – An F0 tornado struck Apache County.
- September 28, 1979 – An F0 tornado touched down in the dessert area of Yuma, Arizona.

=== 1980–1989 ===
FU	F0	F1	F2	F3	F4	F5	Total
0	5	16	0	0	0	0	21

- May 1, 1980 – Two tornadoes struck the state. The first being a F1 that touched down in Yavapai County and taking a 7.7 miles (12.4 km) path and then traveled into Coconino County and dissipated shortly after. Approximately 15 minutes later, another F1 tornado struck Coconino County.
- September 5, 1981 – An outbreak of three tornadoes hit Arizona. The first was a F1 that struck Pinal County, causing at least $250K in damage. Two minutes later, another F1 tornado struck Maricopa County, knocking down several power lines, damaging trees, houses and mobile homes. Leaving at least $250K in damage. Around 4 hours later, another F1 tornado struck Sun City West in Maricopa County. Leaving at least $250k in damage.
- August 12, 1982 – An F0 tornado struck Gila Bend in Maricopa County. The tornado caused slight damage to a building and dissipated shortly after.
- July 31, 1983 – A small and short lived F1 tornado struck Quartzsite in Yuma County; thousand pound chicken coop was destroyed. The tornado caused at least $2.5K in damage.
- August 6, 1983 – A short lived F1 tornado struck Colorado City near the Utah border.
- August 8, 1983 – A small F1 tornado struck Phoenix destroying a barn.
- August 16, 1983 – A violent thunderstorm produced a small F1 tornado in Phoenix. The tornado damaged powerlines which resulted in vehicles also being damaged in parking lots.
- December 27, 1983 – A violent thunderstorm produced a short lived F1 tornado. The tornado struck Colorado City near the Utah border. Houses sustained roof and glass damage, large trees were also damaged and power poles were knocked down.
- July 16, 1984 – Two F1 tornadoes struck Pima County. The first hit Tucson damaging three telephone poles. The second hit Tucson in the center of town.
- July 22, 1984 – A large F1 tornado quickly touched down in Pinal County and dissipated in San Tan Mountain Regional Park while damaging large wood poles.
- August 9, 1984 – A short lived F1 tornado touched down in Phoenix damaging several houses. The tornado caused at least $250K in damage.
- March 15, 1985 – An outbreak of three tornadoes touched down in Arizona and all three hit Pinal County. The first two were F0's that struck Pinal. The last tornado was a short lived F1 that struck Coolidge causing roof damage too a tavern and caused other damage.
- November 18, 1986 – Two tornadoes hit the state and in Pinal County. The first was an F0 that struck Eloy in a very rural area. The second was an F1 that caused damage to at least 60 mobile homes in Apache Junction; some were torn from their foundations. The tornado caused $250K in damage.
- August 29, 1987 – A short lived F0 tornado destroyed two sheds in Phoenix.
- September 22, 1987 – Two tornadoes hit Yuma County, the first being a short lived F0 near the California border. The second was an F1 that damaged a shed and nearby power poles and wheels were thrown against a fence. The tornado caused at least 2.5K in damage.
- July 20, 1988 – An F1 tornado caused roof damage to a storage building in Eloy.
- January 4, 1989 – An F0 struck Maricopa County causing some roof damage to homes. This was Arizona's first winter tornado.

=== 1990–1999 ===
FU	F0	F1	F2	F3	F4	F5	Total
0	41	7	3	0	0	0	51
Injuries: 3

- July 16, 1990 – An F0 tornado struck Cochise County.
- July 21, 1990 – An F0 tornado struck Prescott in Yavapai County damaging powerlines.
- September 3, 1990 – An F0 tornado struck Phoenix. The tornado was described as a "Gustnado".
- August 24, 1991 – An F1 tornado struck Tucson destroying three mobile homes; two people were injured.
- September 2, 1991 – A short lived F0 tornado struck Yavapai County.
- January 6, 1992 – A large pacific low pressure system spawned two tornadoes in Maricopa County. The first, being an F1; it touched down in Phoenix causing roof damage to an apartment complex. The second was a F0 that struck Mesa.
- February 13, 1992 – Three F0 tornadoes hit Maricopa County. The first hit Phoenix; roofs and fences were damaged; the tornado left $2.5K in damage. The second tornado hit Tempe. The third tornado hit Apache Junction damaging 15 mobiles homes, including four that were seriously damaged.
- May 23, 1992 – Two tornadoes struck Maricopa County. The first was a F0 in Scottsdale damaging a fence and a small shed. The second was a F1; a carnival was damaged; glass and a stores front door was damaged.
- July 6, 1992 – Thunderstorms developed in Pima County, which spawned an F1 tornado. 58 power poles were downed; a mobile home was lifted and thrown onto another car. One aircraft was damaged at Tucson International Airport. Many other buildings were damaged or destroyed. Storm data publication lists one person was killed and six were injured. While National Weather Service lists one person was injured. The tornado caused roughly $2.500M in damage.
- August 17, 1992 – A small F0 destroyed three mobile homes in Cochise County.
- August 31, 1992 – A small F0 struck Flagstaff in Coconino County near the Little Colorado River.
- October 24, 1992 – Three tornadoes struck the state Coconino County. The first was a F2 tornado that snapped or uprooted at least 700 pine trees in Flagstaff. The last two were F0's that struck Coconino County.
- January 17, 1993 – An F2 tornado struck Maricopa County; 18 houses were damaged, including four that had major damage in Phoenix. The tornado caused at least $5M in damage which is the highest record for amount of property damage for a tornado in Arizona prior to 2010.
- January 18, 1993 – Two tornadoes hit Maricopa County, the first was an F1 tornado that was reported by a Sheriff's Office in open land. The second was a weak F0 that residents spotted moving north of Phoenix.
- February 8, 1993 – A weak F0 was first spotted by a sheriff's deputy in Maricopa County. Then residents in New River described the tornado "as similar to a freight train" as it made loud sounds, the tornado caused roof damage to one home; it also caused $5K in damage.
- August 5, 1993 – A sheriff's office reported roof damage on homes, this concluded a possible F0 tornado that struck Pinal County.
- August 24, 1993 – A short lived F0 tornado was observed by a storm chaser in Pinal County as it touched down and lifted several times, it was also carrying desert debris.
- August 29, 1993 – A short lived F0 touched down briefly over open land in Cochise County.
- February 8, 1994 – A strong winter storm moved across the state spawning an F0 that struck Maricopa County; it struck the small town of El Mirage causing roof damage and moved a pickup truck about six feet and damaged a metal shed.
- March 7, 1994 – Two weak F0's hit the state, the first was observed by a pilot; it was spotted in foothill golfs course in Maricopa County; a large building had some roof damage. The tornado caused at least $5.000K in damage. The second struck Pima County briefly touching down while ripping some portions of a roof, trash cans and a trampoline were also lifted.
- April 26, 1994 – An F0 tornado was observed for 10 minutes in a rural area in Mohave County.
- July 28, 1994 – An F2 tornado struck northwest of Tucson in Pima County. The tornado unroofed a home and destroyed one roof from another house, two coolers were thrown into a backyard and two large trees were uprooted; cars were damaged; glass was shattered, and a brick all was flattened. The tornado caused $500K in damage.
- February 13, 1995 – A weak F1 tornado struck northeast of Phoenix in Maricopa County. The tornado damaged the General Motors Desert Proving Grounds facility; it had some roof damage and some cars were also damaged, including one that was lifted and moved several feet. The tornado caused $200,000 in damage.
- July 11, 1995 – A pilot reported a tornado in Coconino County.
- July 13, 1995 – A strong thunderstorm produced heavy rain in Mohave County, this also resulted in a weak F0 tornado in a rural area.
- July 14, 1995 – A flight service employee spotted a funnel cloud that briefly touched down in a rural area of Maricopa County; this tornado was rated as an F0.
- May 25, 1996 – Two F0 tornadoes hit the state. The first was spotted by law enforcement; it briefly touched down in Navajo County. The second struck Kayenta in Navajo County, destroying a few small sheds and causing minor damage to other buildings.
- July 14, 1996 – An F1 tornado touched the ground for around 10 seconds in Gila County, lifting a mobile home then dropping it once it lifted.
- August 14, 1996 – A brief F0 tornado struck northwest of Tucson in Pima County.
- September 13, 1996 – An F1 tornado struck Yavapai County, shifting two mobile homes from their foundations and destroying sheds, more property damage occurred.
- November 22, 1996 – An outbreak of four tornadoes struck Arizona. The first was an F0 that struck Kingman in Mohave County, causing damage to a barn and a tool shed, leaving $10,000 in damage. The second was an F0 that briefly touched down near the California border south of highway 68 in Mohave County. The third was an F0 that touched down near highway 93 five miles west of Kingman in Mohave County. The final tornado was an F1 that took a track of 5 miles (8.0 km) with a width of 400 yards (370 m), traveling near interstate 40 and Kingman.
- April 23, 1997 – An outbreak of two tornadoes struck the state. The first was a short lived F0 that damaged three mobile homes in Coconino County. The second was a short lived F0, which was observed by two sheriffs.
- August 23, 1997 – An F0 traveled in a very rural area of Cochise County; it was recorded on video.
- September 12, 1997 – A short lived F0 was observed by NWS employees in Coconino County.
- October 22, 1997 – A very brief F0 was spotted by a NWS employee in Navajo County.
- May 14, 1998 – Three NWS employees observed a very brief F0 tornado that struck the Kaibab Plateau in Coconino County.
- August 6, 1998 – An F0 tornado struck Yavapai County, destroying a house under construction. The funnel was witnessed by a neighbor near by.
- July 6, 1999 – A brief F0 was sighted in open land, carrying dust and debris in Pinal County.
- September 14, 1999 – An outbreak of two F0 tornadoes hit the state. The first struck Yavapai County. The second struck near Prescott in Yavapai County; it was spotted by law enforcement.
- September 15, 1999 – Law enforcement spotted an F0 in Yavapai County.
- September 16, 1999 – A witness spotted a "rope shaped" tornado that briefly touched down twice in Coconino County; they were interviewed on a local TV broadcast. This tornado was officially rated as an F0.

=== 2000–2009 ===
FU	F0	F1	F2	F3	F4	F5	Total
0	25	2	0	0	0	0	27

- April 21, 2001 – A small F1 tornado touched down in San Bernardino County, California; it then crossed into Nevada shortly before moving into Mohave County.
- August 29, 2001 – An F0 tornado was observed by an off duty NWS employee; it was on the ground for about 5 minutes in Navajo County.
- September 16, 2001 – Two F0's hit Snowflake in Navajo County, the first was in a rural area observed by a Sheriff Deputy. The second hit 15 miles west of the town.
- February 28, 2003 – An F0 caused roof damage in neighborhoods as the funnel briefly touched down several times near Scottsdale in Maricopa County.
- May 6, 2003 – A weak F0 touched down near Flagstaff and Wapatki National Monument near Highway 89.
- July 17, 2003 – A weak F0 touched the ground for 30 minutes and remained almost stationary in Navajo County.
- August 14, 2003 – Two F0's struck Yavapai County, the first struck Camp Verde with winds estimated at 60 mph. The second one struck Paulden in a rural area.
- August 15, 2003 – An F0 was spotted near Heber in Navajo County.
- September 9, 2003 – Two F0's struck across the state. The first hit near Bellemont in Coconino County, moving through a pine forest and Highway 180, some trees were knocked down on the road and around 100 were uprooted or snapped, around 35 minutes later, the second tornado uprooted around 12 trees near Wide Ruins in Apache County.
- October 3, 2003 – An F0 was spotted by Law Enforcement in White Cone, Navajo County. There was possible damage to a fence, windmill and some trees.
- April 4, 2004 – A weak and short lived F0 was spotted in open land in Pinal County.
- September 4, 2004 – An F0 struck Gila County, the tornado blocked a road when it damaged trees. This is one of the few tornado events that were reported in Gila County.
- September 29, 2004 – A 15-minute tornado struck east of Winslow and Jack Rabbit; it was photographed as it was visible from interstate 40. Preliminary rating was F0.
- June 23, 2005 – An F0 struck some parts of the Petrified Forest National Park while being observed by law enforcement.
- July 17, 2005 – An F0 briefly touched down in St Johns, Arizona.
- July 25, 2005 – An F0 was spotted right by the Petrified Forest National Park.
- July 31, 2005 – A landspout briefly touched down in a rural area in Pima County; it was rated as an F0.
- October 18, 2005 – An outbreak of four F0's hit across the state, the first tornado of the outbreak struck near Cameron in Coconino County, causing slightly damage to a ranch and destroying outbuildings, one tree had damage and 11 farm animals were missing. The second took a track of 30 miles (48 km) in Kykotsmovi in Navajo County. The third was a radar indicated tornado, which caused tree damage near Perkinsville in Yavapai County. The last tornado of the outbreak was spotted on 5 miles northeast of Highway 89 by a public safety officer.
- March 19, 2006 – A brief F0 was spotted by an off duty NWS employee 10 miles south of Leupp in Coconino County.
- July 16, 2006 – An F0 traveled north of Sunset Point Rest in Yavapai County in a rural area.
- August 10, 2006 – A camera spotted a weak rope-like F0 in a rural area in Yuma County.
- August 30, 2006 – A waterspout formed over a lake and made landfall in a forest in Alpine (Apache County).
- October 8, 2006 – A low pressure system over San Diego California spawned thunderstorms in Arizona, including a brief F0 that struck Pima County, causing damage to a trailer and turning it to its side, a few homes in Marana also sustained damage.
- October 14, 2006 – A high-end F1 tornado struck near Bellemont in Coconino County. The 9 mile-long twister caused damage to very large trees and pine trees.
  EFU	EF0	EF1	EF2	EF3	EF4	EF5	Total
  0	2	0	0	0	0	0	1
- May 6, 2008 – An EF0 tornado briefly touched down near Congress in Yavapai County. This was the first tornado to be rated in the Enhanced Fujita Scale in Arizona.
- August 16, 2008 – An EF0 briefly touched the ground 15 miles northwest of Valle in Coconino County.
- September 3, 2008 – An EF0 briefly struck near Big Lake in the White Mountains.

=== 2010–2019 ===
EFU	EF0	EF1	EF2	EF3	EF4	EF5	Total
0	6	3	5	2	0	0	17
Injuries: 13

- July 29, 2010 – An EF1 struck Wintersburg in Maricopa County, injuring a man after destroying a home. More damaged occurred to houses and automobiles.
- October 6, 2010 – A strong low pressure system over California spawned a hailstorm and 11 tornadoes in the state, this resulted in the largest tornado outbreak in Arizona. The first tornado struck Blue Ridge in Coconino County, the tornado took a track of 14.8 miles (23.8 km) and lots of pine trees were either snapped or uprooted, this tornado gained an EF2 rating, this tornado was previously rated as an EF1. The second was an EF2 that struck Coconino County; it began in a heavily forested area south of Bellemont taking a track of 4.9 miles (7.9 km) causing damage in the forest, this resulted in two local roads being blocked. The third was a long-tracked EF2 taking a path of 26 miles (42 km) east of Bellemont in Coconino County, this tornado destroyed around 30 or 40 RVs; some were tossed onto Interstate 40; several power poles were also damaged. The tornado also struck the Flagstaff Meadows neighborhood. Over 100 homes were damaged, including 21 that were either heavily damaged or destroyed. Seven people were injured; these injuries were non-serious. The fourth was an EF3 that struck west of Bellemont taking a track of 30.06 miles (48.38 km) causing severe forest damage; about 100% of trees were blew down. The tornado then crossed Bellemont derailing 28 train cars, it also crossed Interstate 40 and flipping several semi-trucks and trailers, it then traveled through a forest and blew down thousands of trees. This tornado was previously rated as an EF2 but was recently upgraded as an EF3 due to the forest damage. This was Arizona's longest tracked tornado. The fifth was an EF2 that struck Garjon Tank in Coconino County causing heavy forest damage. The sixth was an EF1 that struck Chalender in Coconino County; several trees were damaged. The seventh was an EF1 that struck Rattlesnake Tank in Coconino County; several trees were either snapped or uprooted. This tornado was previously rated as an EF2 but downgraded to EF1 based on the tree damage. The eighth was an EF0 that struck Bumble Bee in Yavapai County; it was spotted by several residents as it traveled through Interstate 17. The ninth was an EF3 in a very rural area of Tuba City in Coconino County. The tornado had a width of 1,100 yards (1,000 m) and destroyed three 500 KV electrical towers; one was torn from its foundation. The NWS of Flagstaff states "the winds may have been as high as 165 mph". The tenth was a weak EF0 that struck Munds Park in Coconino County causing minor damage. The eleventh was an EF0 that struck Flagstaff; residents from the Country Club Neighborhood spotted it. This was the costliest weather event on record for Arizona.
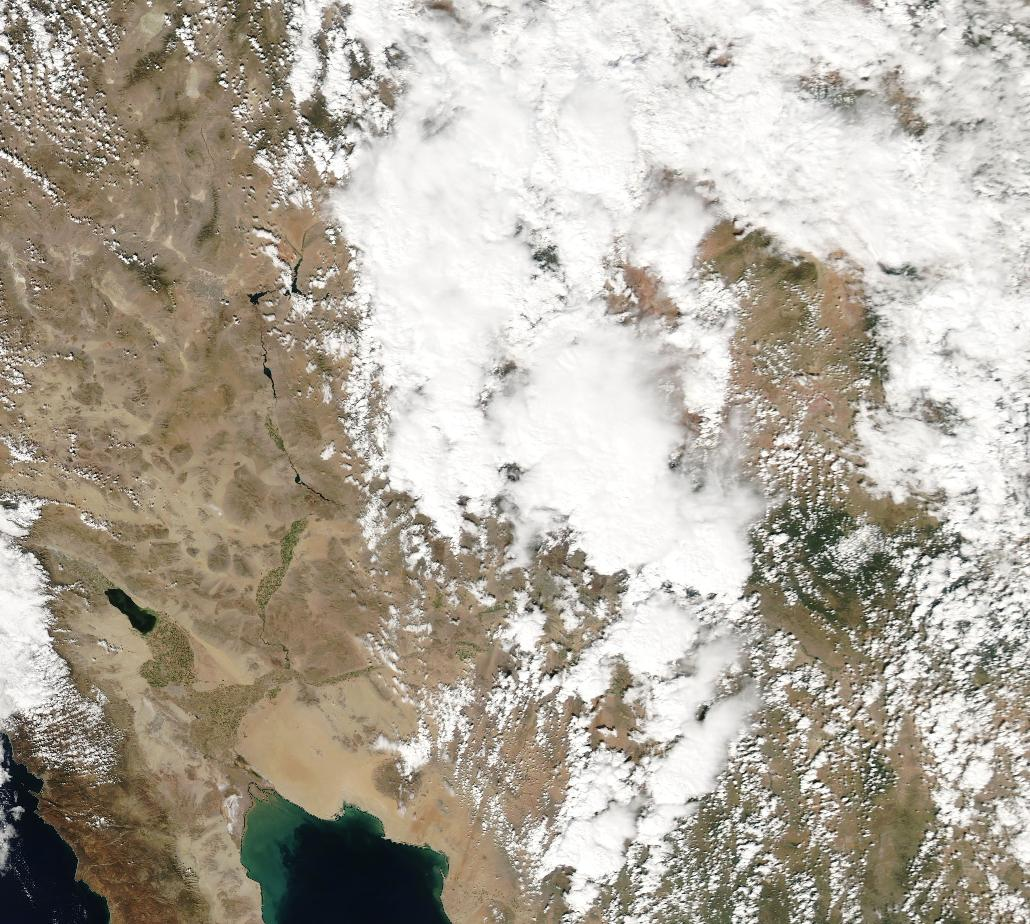
  The supercells that produced 11 tornadoes in the state.
- September 14, 2011 – An EF2 tornado touched down in a forested area inside the Arizona Snowbowl ski area. Significant forest damage occurred at an elevation of around 10,000 feet (3,000 m).
- October 23, 2018 – A very weak tornado touched down adjacent to the Glendale Municipal Airport, and was on the ground for 3.5 miles (5.6 km). The tornado was well-documented, though there were no reports of damage. The tornado was rated an EF0 with estimated maximum wind speeds of 65 mph (105 km/h).
- September 23, 2019 – Three tornadoes touched down in the state, including two EF0s and one EF1. The first tornado touched down near New River, which damaged numerous trees and damaged roofs. The second tornado formed about five miles east of Stanfield. This tornado, however, did not cause any damage. It was rated an EF0. The strongest tornado of the day touched down west of Willcox. Several mobile homes were damaged, including one mobile home that was picked up and moved off of its foundation. Another mobile home was unroofed, and two other homes were damaged. Damage to trees also occurred. Five people were injured from one mobile home. The tornado was rated an EF1 with estimated maximum wind speeds of 90 to 100 mph.

=== 2020–2026 ===
- November 19, 2023 – An EF1 tornado with a length of 2.4 miles (3.9 km), struck the community of Star Valley in Gila County, causing notable damage southwest to the town. A home and an outbuilding were impacted, as well as some trees. The tornado then traveled and caused more property damage to 20 buildings, with some roofs being partially removed and some had glass damage.
- July 2, 2024 – A tornado touched down in the southeast side of Tucson. For most of its life, the tornado ran parallel to Valencia Road. Most of the tornado damage was limited to trees, though some roof damage occurred. Numerous trees were snapped or uprooted, and a shipping container was flipped. The tornado was rated an EF1.
- October 21, 2026 – Two EF1 tornadoes struck the state, the first struck Lookout Mountain (Yavapai County) with a length of 8.02 miles (12.91 km), the second was a high end EF1 that struck Heber–Overgaard, Arizona causing "considerable damage" and injuries to at least one person.

== Climatological statistics ==
The following is a chart showing Arizona tornadoes by month or by time period.

Recorded tornadoes affecting Arizona by month
Month	Number of tornadoes
January	6
February	12
March	12
April	12
May	21
June	25
July	61
August	61
September	52
October	42
November	16
December	3

Recorded tornadoes affecting Arizona by time period
Period	Number of tornadoes
1800s	5
1900–49	3
1950s	19
1960s	27
1970s	46
1980s	21
1990s	51
2000s	38
2010s	49
2020s	43

=== Tornadoes by county ===
Number of tornadoes organized by Fujita or Enhanced Fujita scale rating
County	EF/FU	EF/F0	EF/F1	EF/F2	EF/F3	Total
Apache	4	14	0	0	1	19
Cochise	4	10	4	0	0	22
Coconino	7	39	6	6	2	48
Gila	1	1	3	0	0	5
Graham	0	1	0	0	0	1
Maricopa	9	23	21	6	1	73
La Paz	0	1	0	0	0	1
Mohave	3	9	7	0	0	21
Navajo	4	21	0	0	0	25
Pima	5	16	10	2	0	33
Pinal	4	13	12	0	1	31
Santa Cruz	1	1	0	0	0	2
Yavapai	4	21	3	0	0	28
Yuma	5	5	3	1	0	14

== See also ==
- Lists of tornadoes and tornado outbreaks
- Climate of Arizona
- List of Arizona hurricanes
- List of Arizona wildfires
