= Bearizona =

Safari park in Arizona

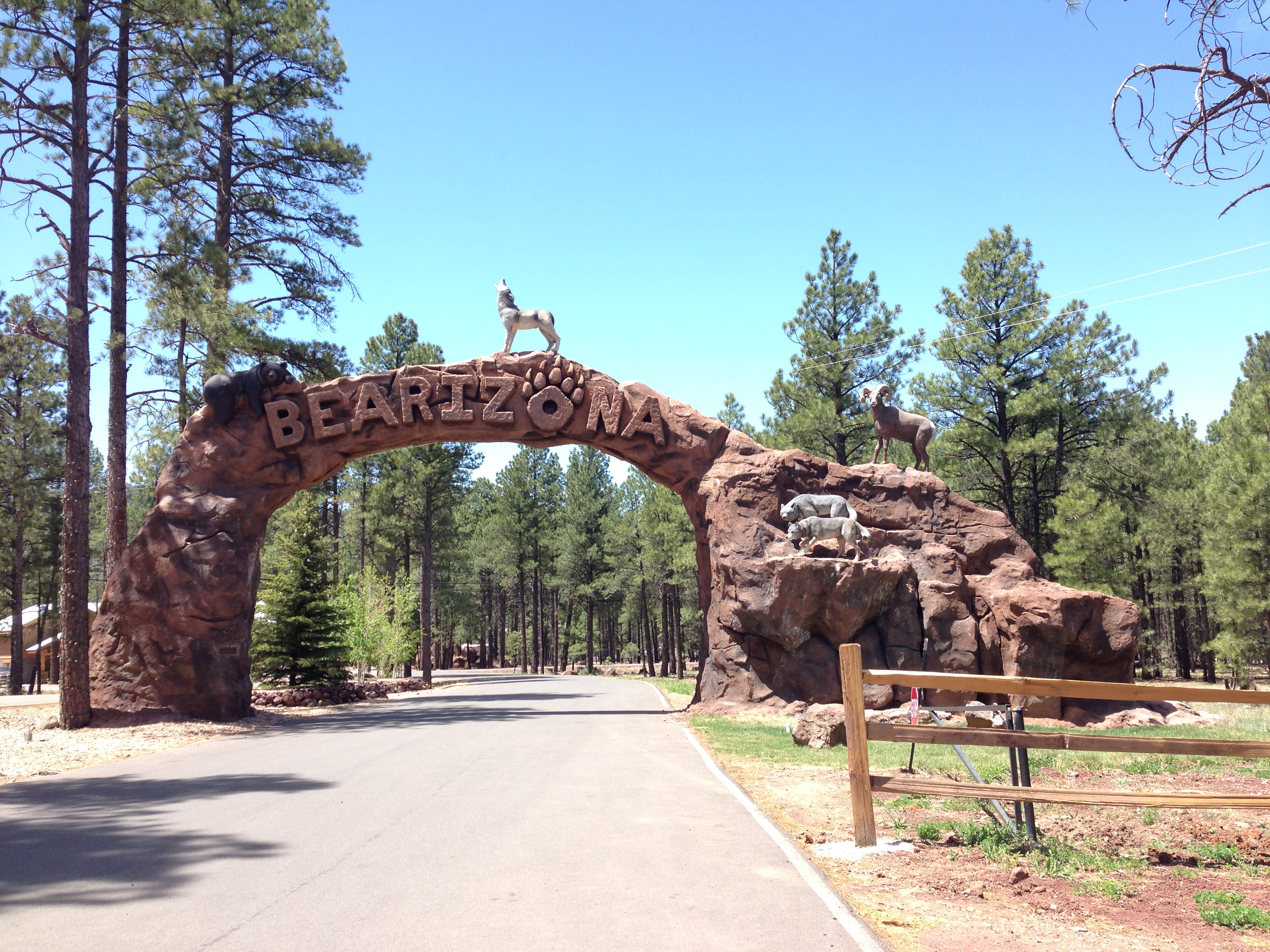
- The park's entrance
- Interactive map of Bearizona
- 35.2518°N 112.1477°W
- Date opened: May 22, 2010
- Location: 1500 E Hist. Rte 66, Williams, AZ 86046
- Land area: 158 acres (64 ha)
- No. of species: ~23
- Annual visitors: 300,000 (2015)
- Memberships: AAZK, ZAA
- Owner: Sean Casey
- Website: bearizona.com

Bearizona is a drive-through safari park near Williams, Arizona, on Historic Route 66. The park contains a variety of animals that visitors can see up close from their car or shuttle. Founded in 2010, the park is known for its black bear cubs.

== History ==
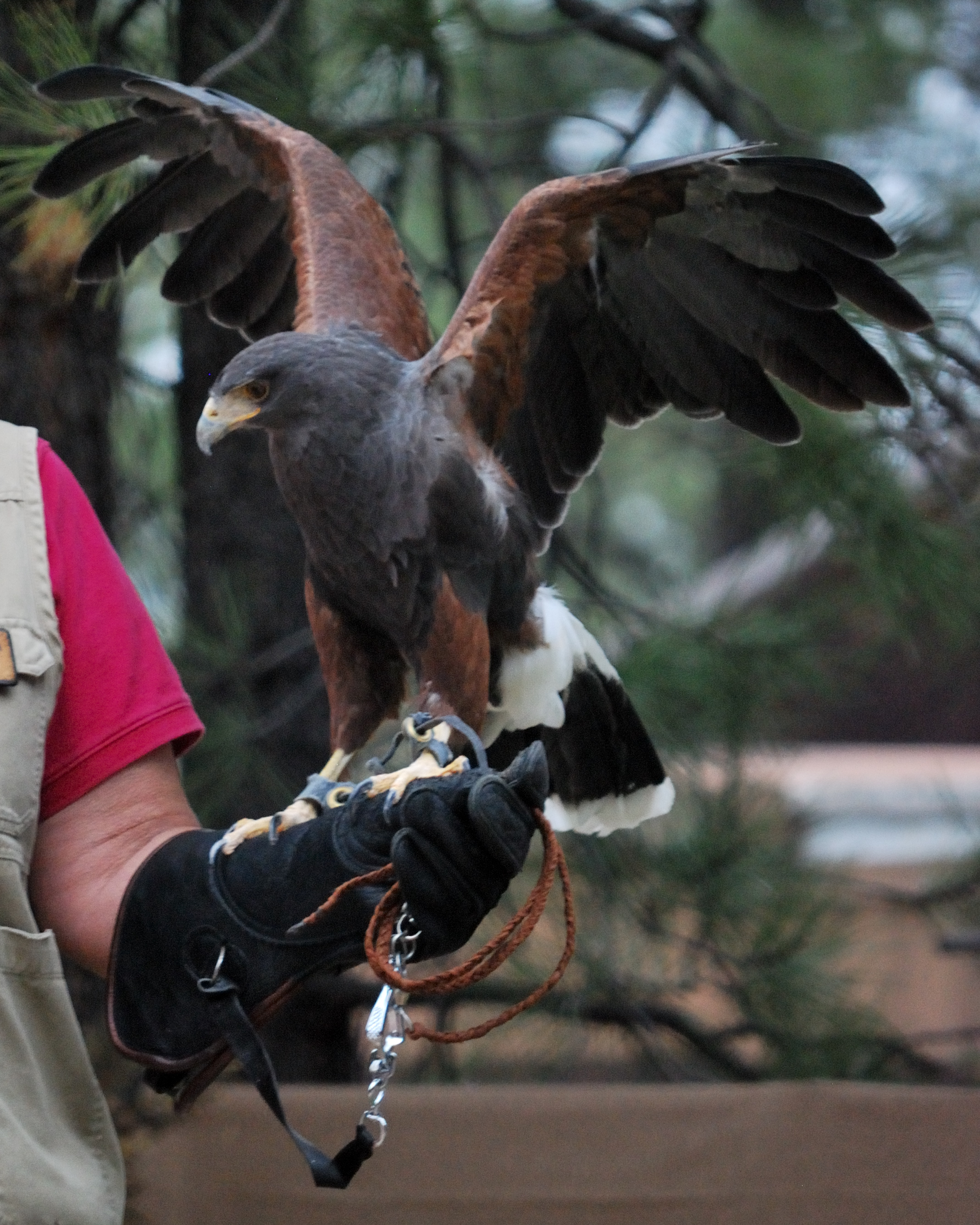
In addition to bears, there are many other animals in the park such as this Harris's hawk (Parabuteo unicinctus).

The park was started by Sean and Dennis Casey, whose parents had founded Bear Country USA. another drive-through safari park, in Rapid City, South Dakota. They chose Williams as the location for their own park as they hoped it would have high traffic as it is located near the intersection of I-40 and SR 64, which leads to Grand Canyon National Park. The park also had a suitable climate. It cost $15 million to create.

The zoo's concept was approved by the city in July 2009 and the Caseys bought the property in August. Roads began construction in October. The park's grand opening and ribbon-cutting ceremony took place on May 22, 2010. It was attended by the Williams-Grand Canyon Chamber of Commerce and the Mayor of Williams, John Moore. A jaguar exhibit opened in 2016. The Canyonlands restaurant opened in May of the same year. In 2018, an otter exhibit opened. During the COVID-19 pandemic, the park remained open with additional preventative measures for visitors in order to avoid contracting the virus. It reported increased numbers during the first month of the pandemic.

== Description ==
The park is 158 acres (64 ha) in size, containing three miles (4.8 km) of roads. The majority of the zoo is covered by a ponderosa pine forest. It is closed from December 31 to March 1.

Most of the animals can be found in Fort Bearizona, a 20-acre (8.1 ha) section of the park that is set up more like a traditional zoo. It contains many black bear cubs, which are one of the zoo's main attractions. The park also contains a 6,000 square feet (560 m^{2}) sit-down restaurant, Canyonlands, and a 12,000 square feet (1,100 m^{2}) gift shop. During the winter season, Bearizona has a Wild Wonderland festival where 400,000 lights synchronized with Christmas music are placed on the trees along with winter-themed events.

=== Animals ===
Animals that can be found at the zoo include:

American black bear (Ursus americanus) cubs wrestling in the park.

- Alaskan tundra wolf
- African wild donkey
- American badger
- American bison
- American black bear
- Arctic wolf
- Bighorn sheep
- Bobcat
- Bronze turkey
- Burmese python
- Donkey
- Grizzly bear
- Jaguar
- Javelina
- Mule deer
- North American beaver
- North American porcupine
- North American river otter
- Prairie dog
- Pronghorn
- Raccoon
- Rocky Mountain elk
- Mountain goat

Harris's hawk, Livingstone's turaco, black vulture, red-legged seriema, fennec fox, crested porcupine, striped skunk, Argentine black and white tegu, milk snake, mountain coati, and three-banded armadillo are animals that can be seen through shows and presentations.

== Gallery ==
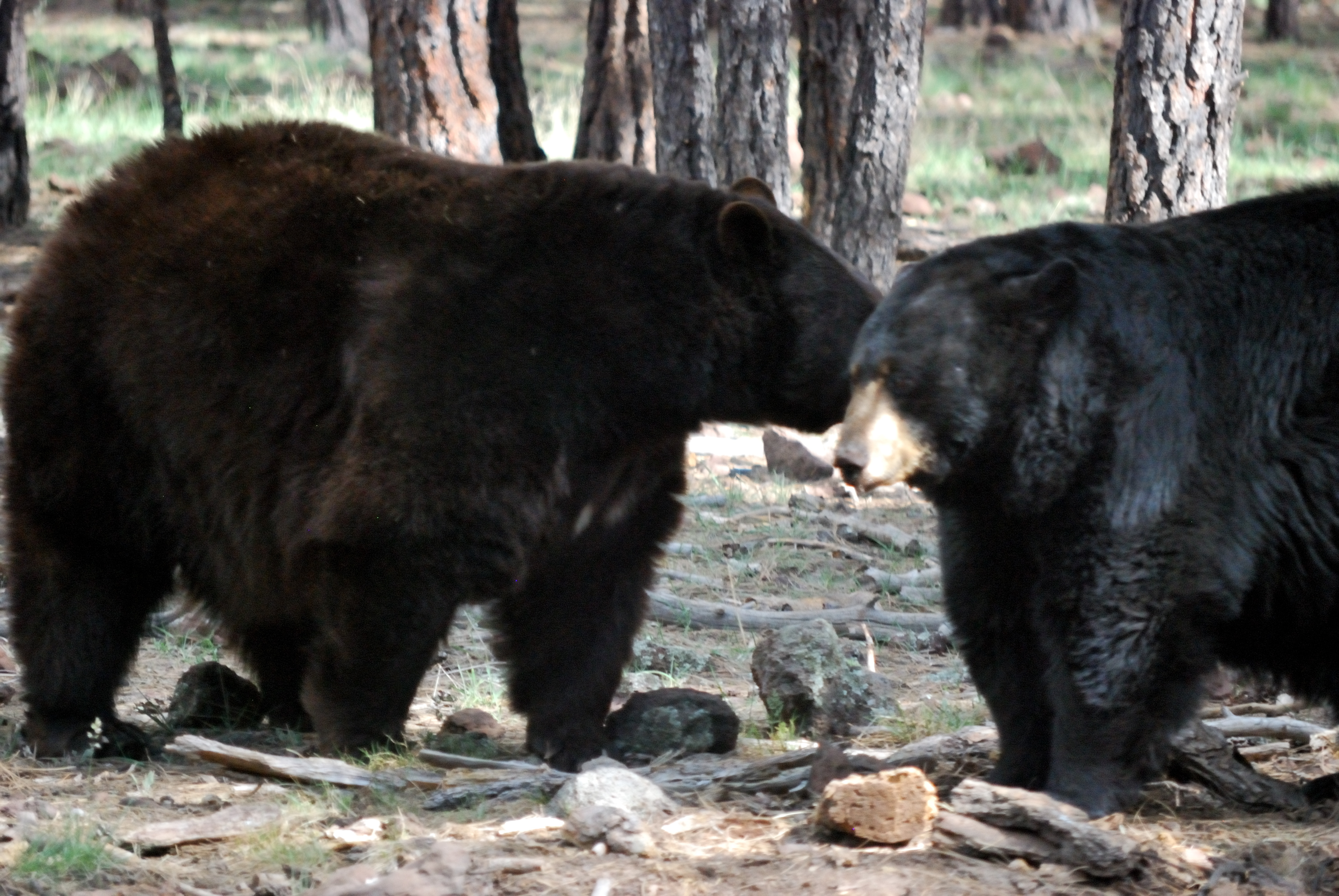
American black bears.

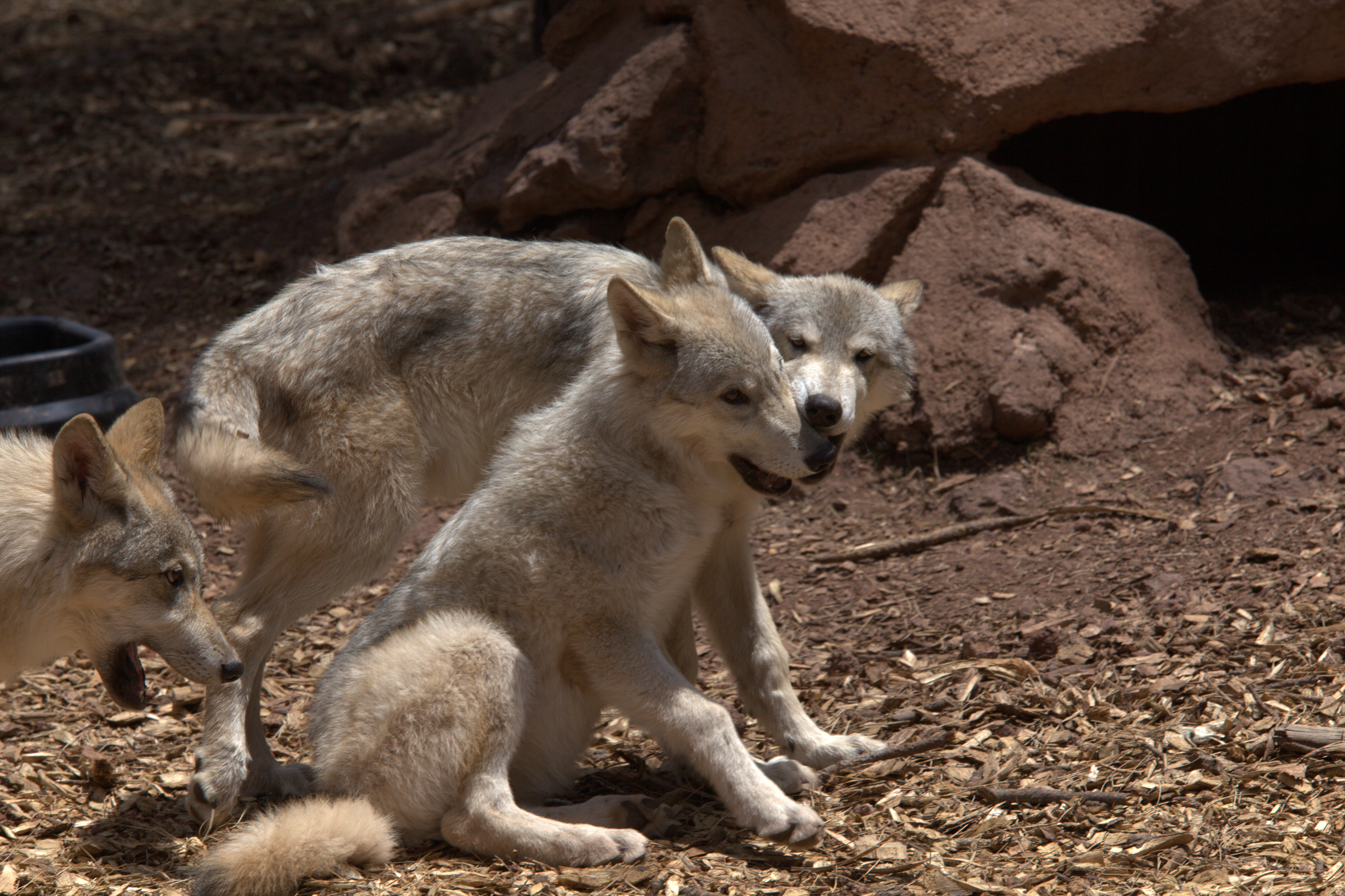
Grey wolves.

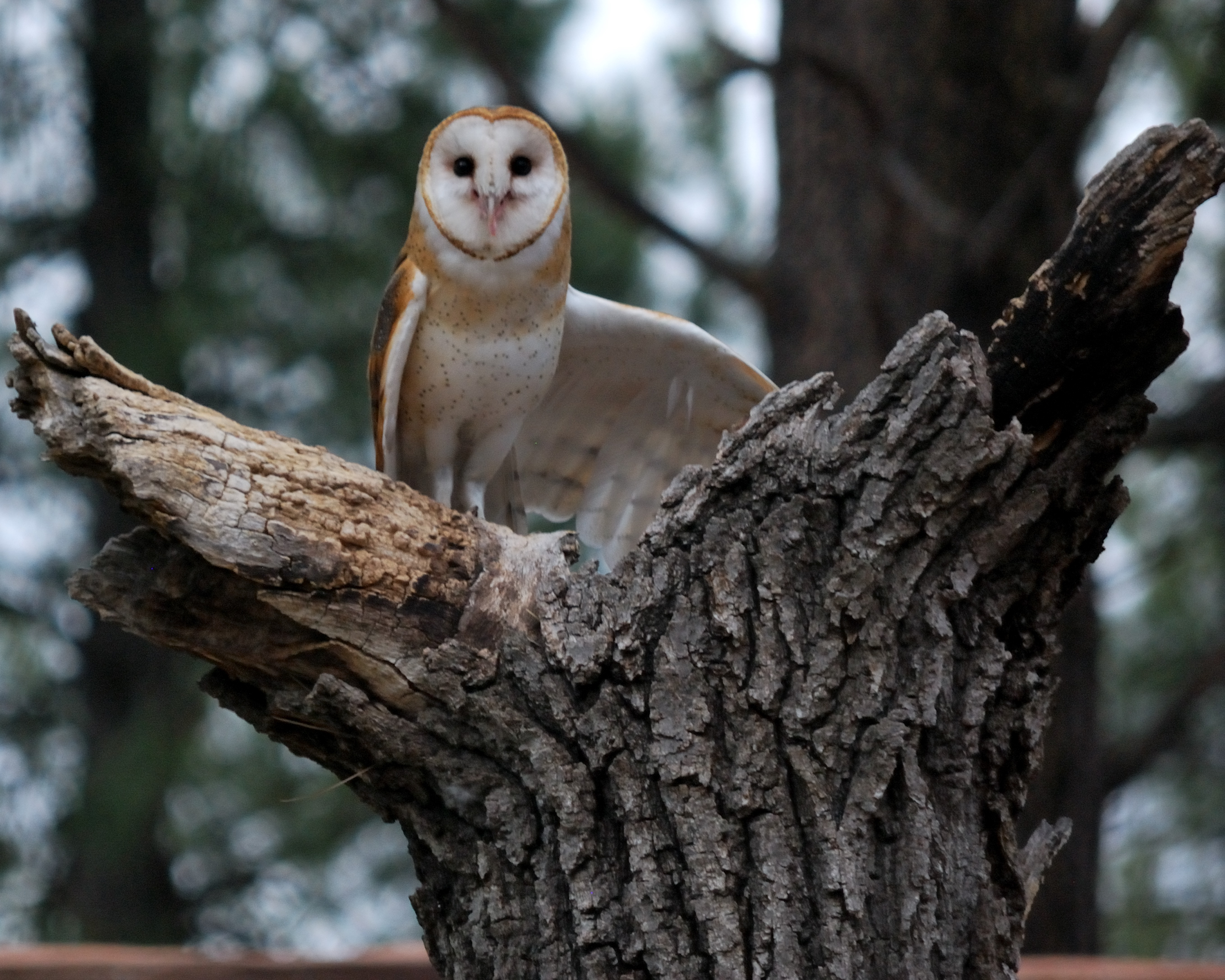

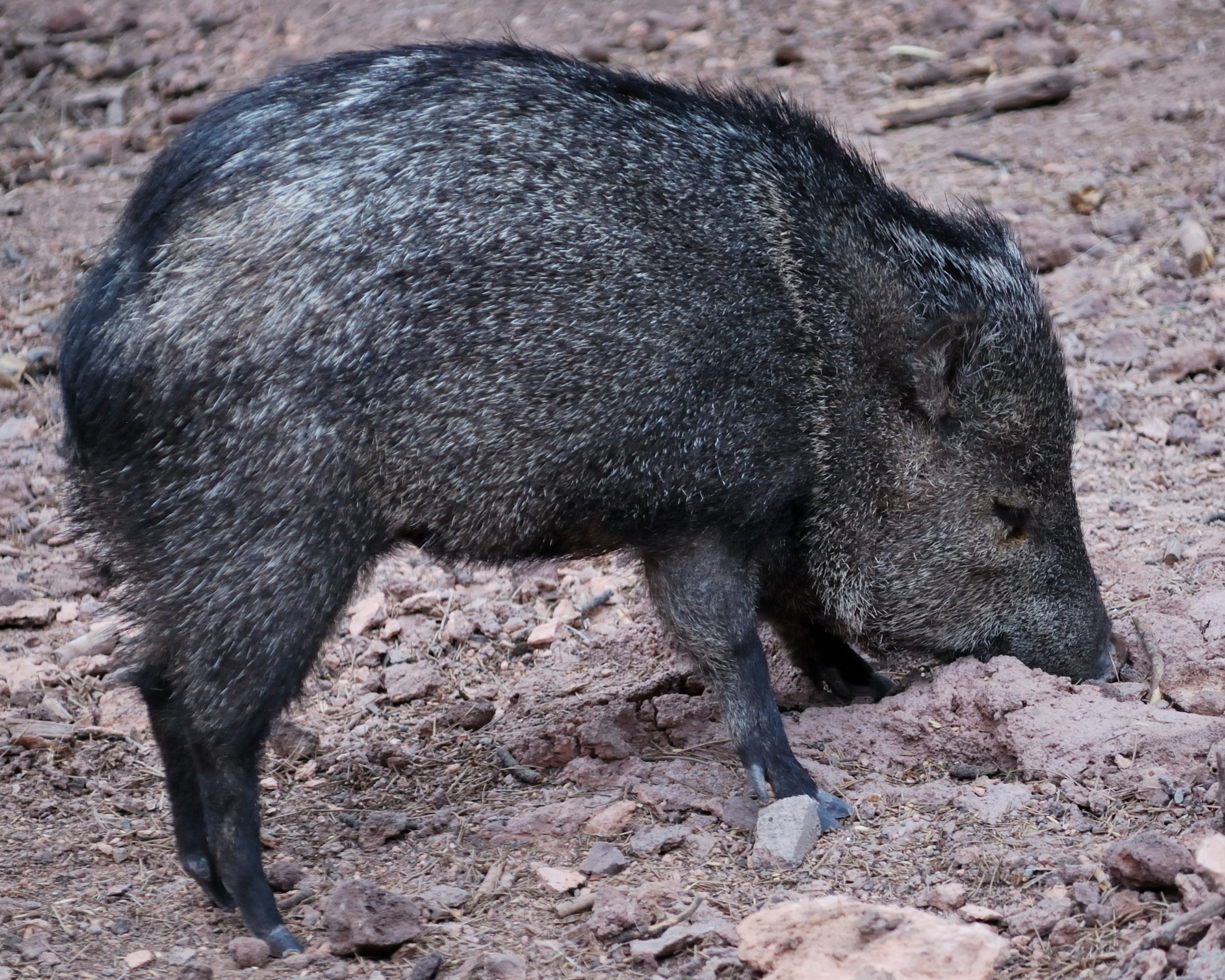
Javelina.

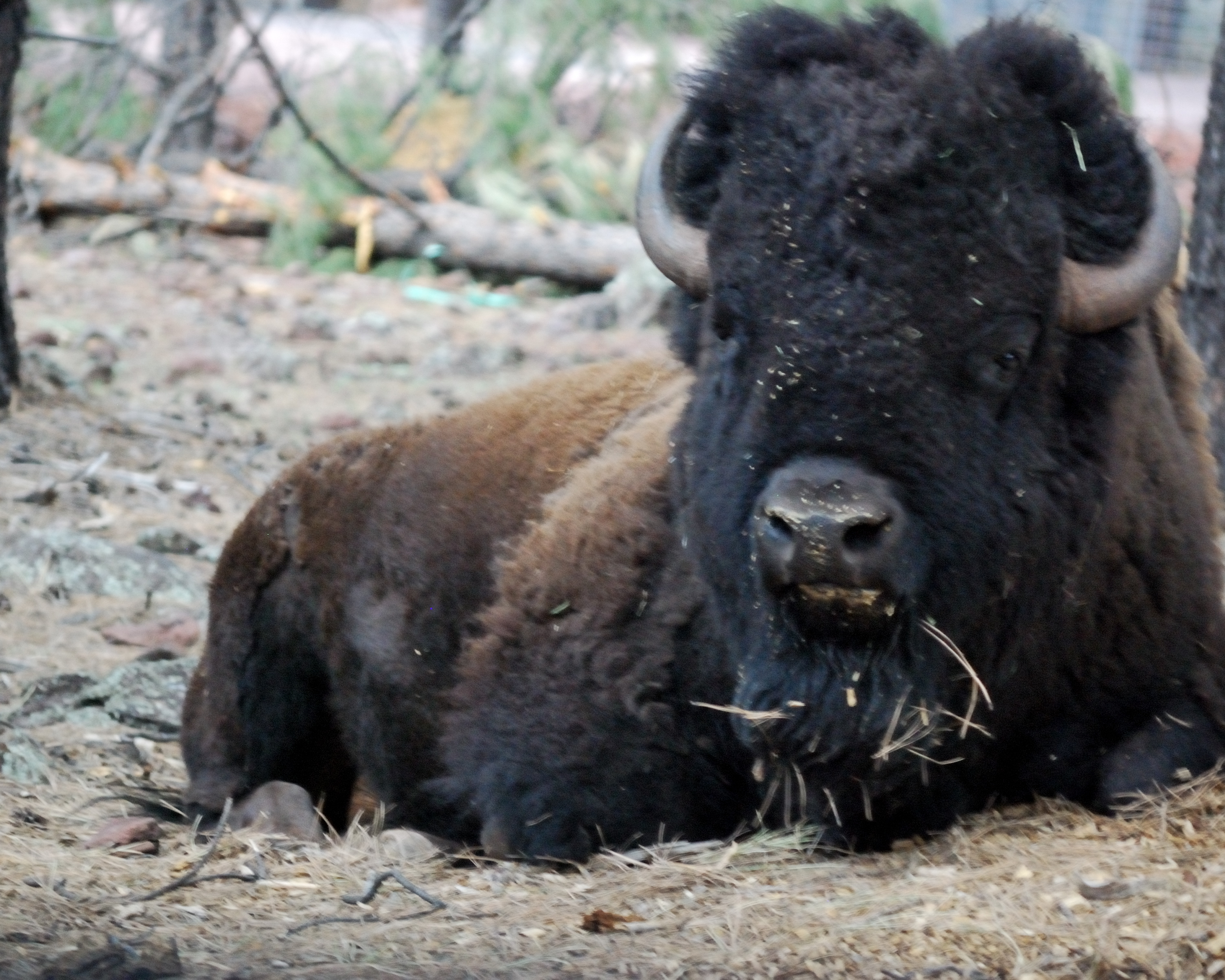
Bison.

== Animal conservation ==
The park contains a pond with captured northern leopard frogs, which was created in partnership with federal and state agencies to provide a safe habitat for the recovering populations of the species. The zoo also rehabilitates and provides a habitat for animals that are unable to be re-released into the wild. Half of the animals are rescues. Water is reused often to conserve resources in the dry climate and scrap metal is repurposed into many structures. Some metal, especially shipping containers and RVs, came from the aftermath of the October 2010 Arizona tornado outbreak and hailstorm in Bellemont.

== Controversies ==
In 2014, the People for the Ethical Treatment of Animals (PETA) reported that Bearizona was transferring some of its bear cubs to Oswald's Bear Ranch in Michigan, which has been known to violate animal welfare laws. Documents from the Arizona Game and Fish Department also revealed that the zoo had previously sent bears to similar, United States Department of Agriculture-cited, facilities in Minnesota and Texas. In March 2017, the park had to go on lockdown due to an armed suspect coming near the park. No one was injured.
