= Alpine Elementary School (Alpine, Arizona) =

School in Arizona, United States

- U.S. National Register of Historic Places
- Location within Arizona Location within the United States
- Location: 11 and 12 Co. Rd. 2052, near jct. with US 180, Alpine, Arizona
- Coordinates: 33°49′38″N 109°08′37″W
- Area: 2.5 acres (1.0 ha)
- Built: 1930
- Architect: School - Unknown; Chapel - Alexander & Burton
- Architectural style: concrete foundation, limestone walls
- NRHP reference No.: 97000369
- Added to NRHP: April 25, 1997

The Alpine Elementary School is a compound consisting of four buildings in Alpine, Arizona, operated by the public Alpine Elementary School District. It serves grades K-8. The original school building of this complex was built in 1930, but a government-funded school had operated here since 1882. The current gym/auditorium was constructed in 1939 for use as a chapel of the Church of Jesus Christ of Latter-day Saints, which had members in the community.

Two more recent constructions consisting of modular buildings. These are not considered as contributing to the historical nature of the site. It was listed on the National Register of Historic Places in 1997.

== History ==
The schoolhouse was constructed as a two-room schoolhouse in 1930. It had been preceded by four earlier schoolhouses. The first schoolhouse was a 20 foot by 20 foot log construction built in 1882. This structure was expanded to 40 by 20 in 1885. This was the community's only schoolhouse until the mid-1910s, when it was accidentally burned down by three children.

A second structure, of wood frame, was constructed in 1916–1917 at a cost of $4,000. It opened in the fall of 1917. The structure contained two classrooms, a stage, and a recreation hall. With a capacity of 300 people, which was greater than the town's population of less than 200. Lightning struck the building in 1919, resulting in a fire that burned the school to the ground. A temporary structure of rough-hewn timber was constructed to serve classes beginning in 1920. In addition to holding classes, all three of these buildings were also used for town meetings as well as religious services.

In 1930 the town spent $4,800 to construct the current stone schoolhouse, which opened for classes in the fall. The building consisted of two classrooms and two cloakrooms. Two outhouses were located at the rear of the building. The structure was of concrete foundation and red limestone walls; the limestone came from a quarry approximately three miles south of the town. One of the classrooms held class for grades 1 through 4, while the other conducted classes for grades 5 through 8. During the 1930s the enrollment varied in number between the high 20s and low 40s.

Upon finishing eighth grade, any students wishing to attend high school were bussed to Round Valley High School, about 20 miles to the north in Eagar.

During the 1930s the schoolhouse served as the township's meeting hall, as well as hosting various functions and serving as the community's LDS church. During the 1940s interior restrooms and indoor plumbing were installed in the school buildings.

With the growth of community population, the LDS ward believed that a chapel was needed for worship. Alexander & Burton designed the building, and construction on the chapel began in 1938, handled by the construction firm of C. Bryant Whiting of nearby Springerville. While the chapel was constructed white limestone, it came from the same quarry as the red limestone of the schoolhouse. The limestone blocks were finished on-site by local workmen, who were supervised by an Italian stonemason.

Wood for the interior was supplied from US Forest Service lands; a total of 150,000 board-feet was processed at a local sawmill owned by a Bishop of the LDS church. The milled arches at the front entry, along with other decorative elements, were created using a wheeled bandsaw. Completed in the spring of 1939, the chapel came in under budget, for less than $17,000. With its larger meeting room, the chapel replaced the schoolhouse as the community's meeting hall, as well as religious center.

According to some accounts, the two-room schoolhouse is the oldest school building in Apache County to be continuously used. In December 1972, due to declining membership, the LDS ward was dissolved. In 1987 the public Alpine Elementary School District acquired the former chapel, and combined it with the schoolhouse, to be used as a multipurpose room and gymnasium. In addition to serving scholastic activities, the chapel continues to be used for community events and meetings.

== Structure ==
The complex consists of several buildings: two older stone structures, the schoolhouse built in 1930 and the former chapel (now used as a gym/multipurpose room) built in 1938–39. Two more modern pre-fabricated modular buildings were erected in the mid to late 1970s.

=== School building ===
The school is a one-story building with a concrete foundation and red limestone walls of ashlar construction. The corners of the building contain quoins of white limestone, and the roof is galvanized sheet metal. There are two entries to the building, on the east and west sides of the building. The main entry lies to the east, with the rear entry to the west. Both entries have double wooden doors inside of which is a vestibule adorned with stone piers with concrete arches. The schoolhouse architecture is of no particular singular style. American Craftsman and Bungalow style can be seen in the decorative wooden shingles below the gable ends, three-light panel doors, and knee braces; Romanesque Revival style is seen in the rounded arches of the two entries.

Originally, the interior consisted of two classrooms and a coatroom. In the 1940s the external outhouses were replaced by installing internal plumbing and two restrooms. The classrooms are divided by a sliding wooden partition. The original wood-burning stoves used to heat the structure have since been replaced by central heating. Neither the architect or builder is known.

=== Former chapel ===
The gymnasium is a one-and-a-half story building with an asymmetrical floorplan and cross-gabling. Like the schoolhouse, it has a concrete foundation, although it has a partial basement. Like the school, it has dressed limestone walls set in a random ashlar pattern, but differs from the school in that the limestone is white, rather than red. Its roof is made of composition shingles. The front of the building has a recessed porch supported by wooden arches; its front door has solid batten construction with wrought-iron hinges. Decorative Stick style flourishes can be found at the front entry, and both the east and west gable ends. Other decorative touches include notched rafter ends on each eve, as well as the dormer roof. Most of the building's windows are of the metal casement style with wooden sashes, original to the structure, except for one which has been replaced by a modern aluminum slider.

The original assembly room of the chapel became the school's auditorium and gymnasium, the original flooring replaced by maple hardwood, to serve as the surface for a basketball court. The former church office was redone to become a kindergarten room, and two smaller rooms were combined to become the home economics classroom, which also doubles as the school's cafeteria. An interior restroom has also been added.

Alexander & Burton were the architects of the chapel. They designed several LDS churches during the 1930s and 1940s, including the Phoenix LDS Third Ward Chapel and the LDS church in St. Johns, both built in 1938. The chapel was built by C. Bryant Whiting, a Springerville contractor, and its successful completion led to his success as a contractor.

=== Other buildings ===
Originally, there were two outhouses to the rear of the school building, but they were removed when interior plumbing and restrooms were installed in the 1940s. Between 1976 and 1979 two prefabricated modular buildings were constructed behind the schoolhouse, in order to increase the capacity of the school. One of the modules houses the school's offices and a music room, while the other contains the library and a learning library.

== See also ==
- National Register of Historic Places listings in Apache County, Arizona
