= Alpine Elementary School District =

School district in Arizona, United States

Address
- 101 County Rd 2311 Alpine, Arizona, 85920; United States
- Coordinates: 33°50′51″N 109°08′29″W

District information
- Type: Public
- Grades: K–8
- NCES District ID: 0400630

Students and staff
- Students: 56
- Teachers: 5.0
- Staff: 9.05
- Student–teacher ratio: 11.2

Other information
- Website: www.alpine.k12.az.us

Alpine Elementary School District is a K-8 public school district with headquarters in Alpine, unincorporated Apache County, Arizona. It consists of one school, Alpine Elementary School.
