= Luna Lake (Arizona) =

Waterbody in Apache County, Arizona

- Location within Arizona Location within the United States
- Location: Apache County, Arizona
- Coordinates: 33°49′44.92″N 109°5′22.56″W
- Basin countries: United States
- Surface area: 75 acres (30 ha)
- Average depth: 8 ft (2.4 m)
- Surface elevation: 7,890 ft (2,400 m)

Luna Lake is a natural body of water that covers approximately 75 acres (0.30 km^{2}) of land. It is located about three miles (5 km) southeast of Alpine, Arizona, at the elevation of 7,890 ft (2,400 m), and is the centerpiece of the Luna Lake Wildlife Area.

Luna Lake has the distinction of being part of the San Francisco River, flowing easterly into New Mexico, then south, and west into the Gila River (in Arizona). The headwaters are north of the other main mountain tributary to the Gila, the Blue River of Arizona.

== Location ==
Luna Lake lies at 7,890 feet (2,400 m) on the Apache-Sitgreaves National Forests, as such the facilities located here are managed by that authority. It is located about 3 miles (4.8 km) east of Alpine. It’s accessible year-round, but ices over in winter months.

== Description ==
Luna Lake is a 75-acre (300,000 m^{2}) impoundment of the upper San Francisco River. It has a maximum depth of 21 feet (6.4 m) and an average depth of 8 feet (2.4 m). It is stocked annually with fingerling and subcatchable rainbow and cutthroat trout. Because it is a shallow, nutrient-rich lake, it is subject to water quality problems and excessive weed growth. The Arizona Game and Fish Department annually harvests weeds to help alleviate some of the water quality problems.

== Fauna and flora ==
The following species are noted at Luna Lake.

- Gray catbird, (South and West of most westerly ranges in New Mexico, and Colorado.)
- Southwestern willow flycatcher
- Bald eagle
- Mexican spotted owl
- Arizona myotis (Myotis occultus), a mouse-eared bat
- Northern leopard frog
- Chiricahua leopard frog
- Clover: Trifolium neurophyllum, "White Mountains clover"
- Gila groundsel, Senecio quaerens, Senecio

== Fish species ==
- Rainbow trout
- Yellowstone cutthroat trout
