= Chalender, Arizona =

Ghost town in Arizona, United States

Coordinates: 35°14′04″N 112°01′31″W

Chalender or Challender was a populated place in Coconino County, Arizona, United States. It had a mainline railway station, sawmill, and school. It was located on the Atlantic and Pacific Railroad between Williams and Bellemont.
