= October 2010 Arizona tornado outbreak and hailstorm =

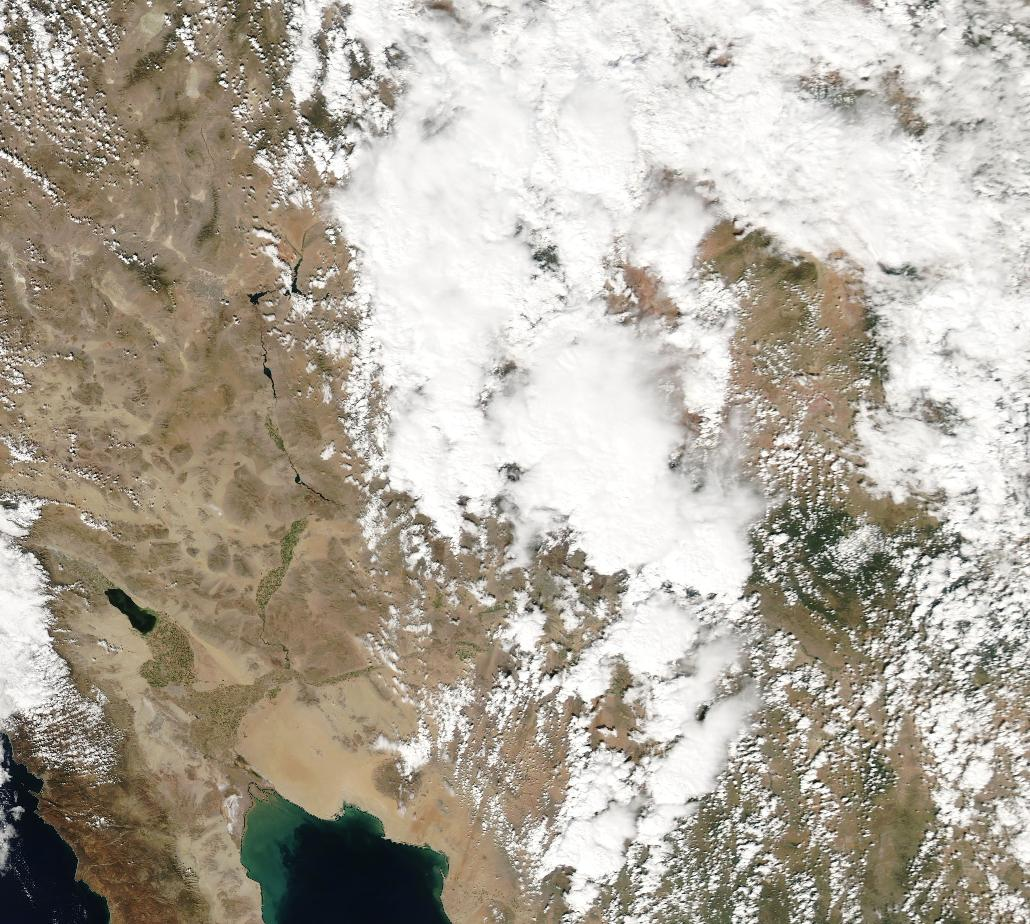
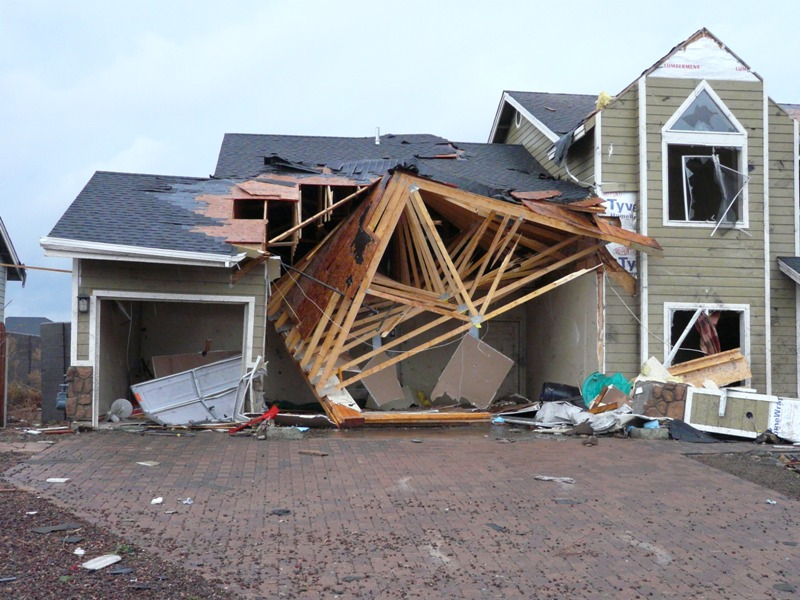
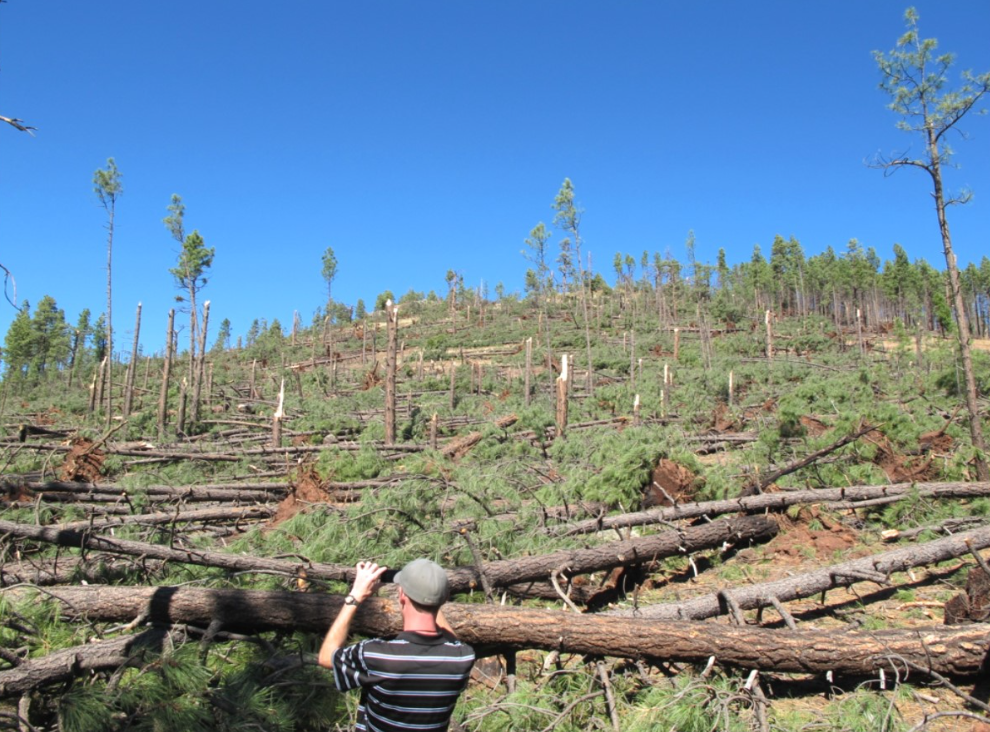
- Top: Supercells over Northern Arizona during the tornado outbreak; Bottom left: A home damaged by an EF2 tornado in Bellemont, Arizona; Bottom right: Several trees snapped in half near Bellemont as a result of a tornado

Meteorological history
- Duration: October 5–6, 2010

Tornado outbreak
- Tornadoes: 12
- Max. rating: EF3 tornado
- Duration: 8 hours
- Largest hail: 3.0 in (7.6 cm) in diameter in Glendale, Arizona

Overall effects
- Fatalities: 0
- Injuries: 11 injuries (7 tornadic)
- Damage: $4.9 billion
- Areas affected: Southwest United States
- Part of the tornado outbreaks of 2010

On October 5–6, 2010, a destructive series of thunderstorms struck Arizona, resulting in the state's largest tornado outbreak and its costliest weather disaster on record. Spawned by a nearby cold-core low, successive hailstorms in Phoenix and surrounding locations on October 5 caused damage to thousands of homes, businesses, and vehicles. The following day, a record 12 tornadoes were recorded, multiple strong/EF2 or greater on the Enhanced Fujita scale and many in close proximity to one another; this included two tornadoes rated EF3. Thunderstorms on both days caused significant flash flooding which inundated businesses, stranded vehicles, and closed roadways. Damage throughout the state reached $4.9 billion, including $2.7 billion in insured loss from just hail damage, the costliest weather event on record in Arizona. Some impacts occurred in California, Nevada, and Utah as well as the cold-core remained stationary over several days.

== Meteorological synopsis ==
In 2008, researchers examined the overlap between large-scale environments responsible for producing tornadoes in Northern Arizona. They utilized 38 days between 1950 and 2006 that involved the formation of classic supercell thunderstorms and confirmed tornadoes across the state. Of those 38 days, researchers found a similar meteorological progression in half of them. The overlapping setup involved the approach of a cold-core low and a favorable placement of the warm sector across Arizona. The approach of these mid- to upper-level lows, detached from the jet stream, allowed for southerly wind vectors to overspread the state. This not only afforded the wind shear necessary for tornadic development, but also provided a supply of warm, moist subtropical air. Compared to previously analyzed tornado environments across the United States, researchers found that Northern Arizona events typically featured marginal instability, averaging around 450 J/kg.

On October 5, 2010, the dominant pattern across the United States bore resemblance to the setups described in previous research. An omega block existed across the country, so named for its uncharacteristically persistent weather conditions across the country on the scale of days to weeks. This omega block was characterized by a high-pressure area over the Central United States and two separate cold-core lows, one over California and the other off the coast of New Jersey. As the western low remained nearly stationary, an unstable atmosphere began to develop across Arizona, prompting the Storm Prediction Center (SPC) to outline a Slight risk across the state. Southeasterly winds at the surface intersected the dryline, providing the impetus for thunderstorm development. Surface dewpoints rose to around 60 °F (16 °C), while instability levels resided near 1,000 J/kg, and strong wind shear values were likewise favorable. A cluster of strong thunderstorms developed across the Phoenix, Arizona, metropolitan area, contributing to a severe hail event there. While this activity also produced sporadic straight-line wind damage, a more robust event into the evening hours was hindered by the loss of daytime heating and the departure of favorable dynamics for severe storm development.

By the morning of October 6, forecasters anticipated only a marginal risk of severe weather across Arizona. While instability was expected to climb around 500–1,000 J/kg throughout the afternoon hours, favorable dynamics were expected to shift away from the state and instead be replaced by sinking air aloft. However, as the pre-dawn hours progressed, the overarching cold-core low over California began to retrograde toward the west-northwest. This prolonged the duration of an unstable environment across Arizona, and the SPC once again issued a Slight risk across Arizona accordingly. While large hail and damaging winds were expected to be the primary threats, an isolated tornado risk was also outlined. However, as a well-defined piece of energy rotated around the base of the cold-core low, a more significant tornado event than expected materialized. Rounds of supercells developed across Northern Arizona, producing 11 confirmed tornadoes, the most on record in one day in Arizona and, along with an additional tornado in Utah, the highest number of tornadoes on record in a single event west of the Continental Divide. Many of these tornadoes were strong, EF2 or higher on the Enhanced Fujita scale. One noteworthy aspect of the event is that every tornadic supercell began to show signs of rotation south of the Mogollon Rim, but none of them produced confirmed tornadoes until after they tracked over that geological feature. This strongly suggests that the mountainous terrain had a significant influence on the development of tornadoes that day. Since these supercells moved along a north–south orientation, they not only produced tornadoes in very close proximity to one another, but also contributed to flash flooding throughout the region. Additional severe thunderstorms overspread Utah, Colorado, and Wyoming into afternoon hours before the event subsided.

== Confirmed tornadoes ==
Confirmed tornadoes by Enhanced Fujita rating
EFU	EF0	EF1	EF2	EF3	EF4	EF5	Total
0	4	2	4	2	0	0	12

=== October 6 event ===
List of confirmed tornadoes – Wednesday, October 6, 2010 (Note: All dates are based on the local time zone where the tornado touched down; however, all times are in Coordinated Universal Time for consistency.)
EF#	Location	County / Parish	State	Start Coord.	Time (UTC)	Path length	Max width	Summary
EF2	NW of Washington Park to NE of Lost Eden	Coconino	AZ	34.44°N 111.3°W	08:50–09:12	14.8 mi (23.8 km)	400 yd (370 m)	Hundreds of ponderosa pine trees were snapped or blown down along the path. An alligator juniper tree that was 2.5 feet (0.76 m) in diameter was snapped. Trees were blown down across SR 87 for 2 miles (3.2 km).
EF2	NW of Sedona	Coconino	AZ	34.996°N 111.878°W	11:55–12:02	4.9 mi (7.9 km)	400 yd (370 m)	Many trees were snapped or blown down. Two forest roads were completely blocked by fallen trees.
EF2	W of Kachina Village to Bellemont to NNW of Fort Valley	Coconino	AZ	35.106°N 111.839°W	12:07–12:44	26 mi (42 km)	500 yd (460 m)	Over 100 houses and several businesses were damaged, including at least 21 houses that were significantly damaged or destroyed. Massive tree damage was also reported with thousands of trees snapped, and campers isolated as a result. An RV dealership was impacted, with over 30 RVs demolished and thrown onto I-40. 75 power poles were knocked down. The tornado passed only 2/3 mile (1.1 km) east of the National Weather Service office in Bellemont. Seven people were injured. An anemometer placed by the Northern Arizona University School of Forestry measured an instantaneous wind gust of 185 miles per hour (298 km/h), a 1-second wind gust of 161 miles per hour (259 km/h), and a 3-second wind speed of 115 miles per hour (185 km/h).
EF3	WSW of Kachina Village to Bellemont to NNW of Fort Valley	Coconino	AZ	35.05°N 111.865°W	12:54–13:50	30.06 mi (48.38 km)	800 yd (730 m)	A long track, wedge tornado paralleled the track of the previous EF2 tornado 1 mile (1.6 km) to the west. The tornado was sighted by NWS employees as this tornado passed only 1/3 mile (0.54 km) west of the National Weather Service office in Bellemont. Multiple semi-trucks and trailers were flipped on I-40, and 28 rail cars were derailed. Forest damage was severe, and many roads were blocked, and thousands of trees were downed in a circular pattern in a large swath. A few trees in the worst affected areas sustained debarking, and power poles were also snapped. Some structures were damaged. This is currently the longest tracked tornado in Arizona.
EF2	SW of Kachina Village to Western Bellemont	Coconino	AZ	34.982°N 111.927°W	13:50–14:14	18.6 mi (29.9 km)	600 yd (550 m)	Extensive forest damage occurred, with more forest roads being blocked due to fallen trees. This tornado passed 2 miles (3.2 km) west of the National Weather Service office in Bellemont as it was dissipating. The path of this tornado may have been made up of three different tornadoes instead of one longer-tracked tornado due to some evidence of extensive cycling.
EF1	SSE of Chalender	Coconino	AZ	35.108°N 111.965°W	15:29-15:33	0.7 mi (1.1 km)	100 yd (91 m)	A tornado was determined via aerial photography and surveys.
EF1	NNW of Sedona	Coconino	AZ	34.981°N 111.876°W	16:10–16:15	1.1 mi (1.8 km)	100 yd (91 m)	A tornado along a short path was determined via damage surveys and aerial imagery.
EF0	ENE of Bumble Bee	Yavapai	AZ	34.236°N 111.973°W	17:30–17:35	4 mi (6.4 km)	50 yd (46 m)	Tornado was observed as it remained over grasslands east of I-17.
EF3	SE of Tuba City	Coconino	AZ	35.909°N 111.005°W	18:15–18:20	≥4 mi (6.4 km)	1,100 yd (1,000 m)	A large tornado tracked over an unpopulated region. Three metal truss transmission towers were destroyed – one of which was flattened – on the Navajo Nation. The total path length of the tornado is unknown since it passed over a very rural area.
EF0	Munds Park	Coconino	AZ	34.908°N 111.655°W	19:10–19:20	3.8 mi (6.1 km)	200 yd (180 m)	A tornado was visually observed as it crossed I-17. Minimal damage occurred.
EF0	Eastern Flagstaff	Coconino	AZ	35.159°N 111.548°W	19:20–19:25	1.7 mi (2.7 km)	100 yd (91 m)	A tornado was observed on the eastern side of Flagstaff. Little damage occurred.
EF0	WSW of Canyonlands National Park	Wayne	UT	38.28°N 110.28°W	20:00–20:05	1.24 mi (2.00 km)	10 yd (9.1 m)	About 30 juniper trees were snapped or uprooted in a remote forested area.

== Non-tornadic effects ==
During the afternoon hours of October 5, a series of severe hailstorms affected Maricopa County, Arizona. One storm produced hail up to 1.5 in (38 mm) in diameter across Phoenix and into Carefree, damaging roofs and cars and breaking hundreds of skylights. Another storm produced hail up to 2.5 in (64 mm) as it tracked from south of Chandler into Scottsdale. These tennis ball sized hail stones damaged hundreds of roofs and vehicles, in addition to damaging dozens of aircraft at the Scottsdale Airport. The most substantial event of the day occurred with a storm that moved from Firebird Lake to south of Chandler into northern Glendale and finally across southern Peoria. Widespread golf ball to baseball sized hail, up to 3 in (76 mm) in diameter, damaged thousands of roofs and vehicles. In northwestern Phoenix and Glendale, this hailstorm compounded the effects of the earlier event. One person was injured by large hail on a football practice field. Thirty-four skylights at the St. Mary's Food Bank in Phoenix were punctured, allowing heavy rainfall to flow into the structure. Approximately 20 percent of the food inventory was ruined, equating to about 1.4 million meals. In total, more than 150,000 homes were damaged throughout Maricopa County, forcing thousands of insurance claims. The estimated size of the hail that struck the county was the third largest in Arizona history, and its estimated cost reached $2.7 billion in insured damages, the costliest weather disaster on record in the state.

The stalled cold-core low produced heavy rainfall across the broader Nevada, Utah, Arizona, and California region. Over the course of five days, up to 5 in (130 mm) of rain fell across Southern Utah. The Western Regional Climate Center in Reno, Nevada, received 0.92 in (23 mm) in just one hour, one of the greatest hourly rainfall rates on record at that location. Flash flooding converged into the Hualapai Canyon and moved toward the village of Supai, Arizona. In advance of the flood, 143 campers were airlifted to safety. Three tribal pack animals were killed in the village. The canyon was indefinitely closed to tourists following damage to the trail and campground. President Barack Obama declared the Havasupai Canyon a major disaster area and offered federal aid to assist in local recovery efforts. The cost to replace the affected instructure reached $1.63 million. Heavy rains caused the roof of a structure to collapse in southwestern Phoenix. In Clark County, Nevada, an 8–10 ft (2.4–3.0 m) wall of water pushed into the Callville Bay Marina, destroying most of that structure, rendering many roads impassable, and destroying multiple power poles and cross arms. In numerous cases throughout the region, multiple feet of water washed over roadways, disrupting travel, washing away routes, or stranding vehicles. Additional roads were closed by fallen rocks. In Kern County, California, debris flows flowed into several businesses, forcing their closure for many hours. Two 17-year-old boys were struck by lightning in St. George, Utah, and taken to the hospital in critical condition; they were later expected to make a full recovery. Lightning in Tolleson, Arizona, caused a residential structure fire as well. The totality of severe weather in Arizona on October 5–6 reached $4.9 billion. At elevations greater than 7,500 ft (2,300 m) throughout the Southern Sierra Nevada, early season snowfall up to 8 in (200 mm) was also recorded.

== See also ==
- Tornadoes of 2010
