= Alpine, Arizona =

CDP in Apache County, Arizona

- Census-designated place
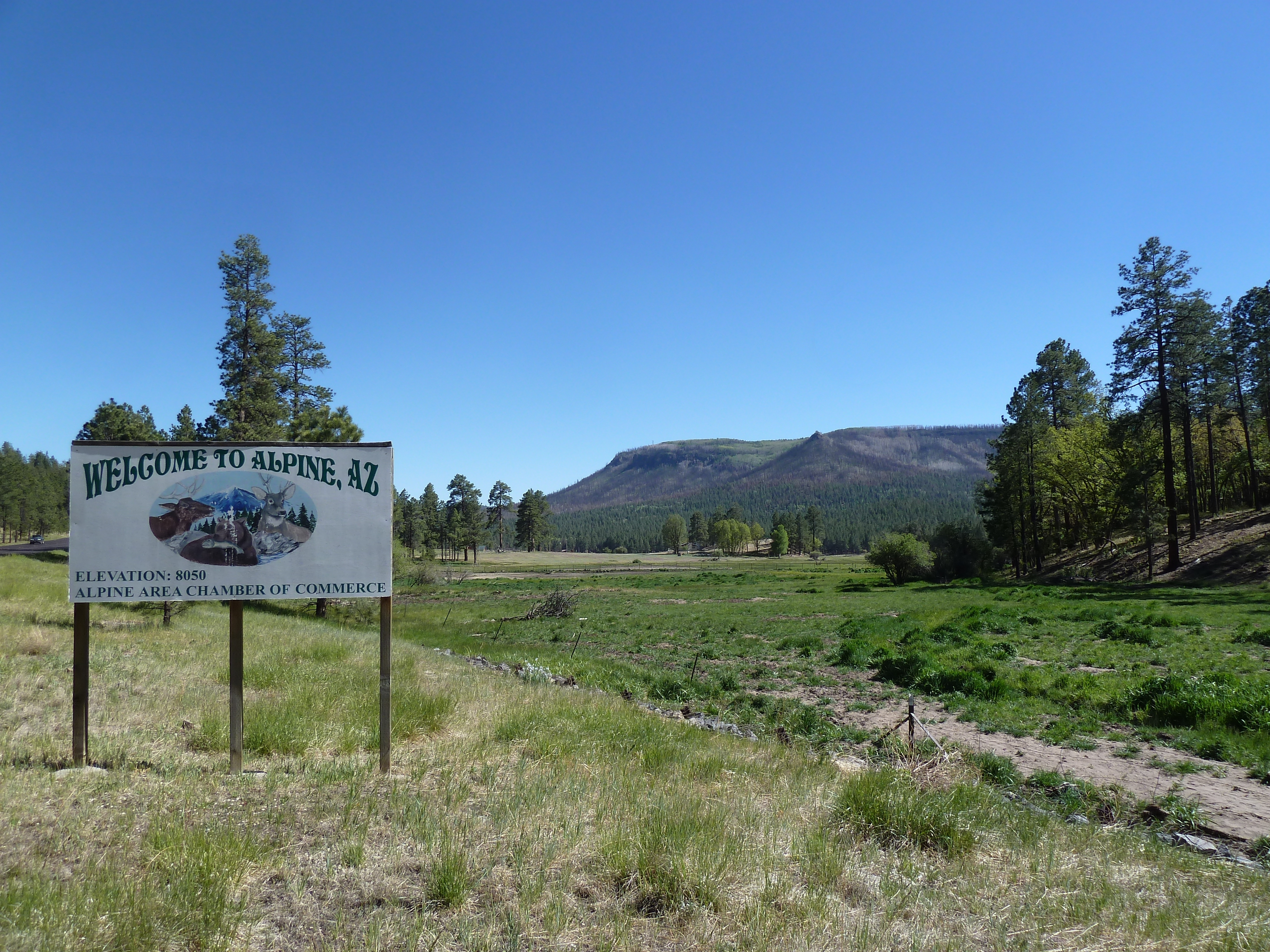
- Welcome sign in Alpine

- Location within Arizona
- Coordinates: 33°50′46″N 109°08′34″W
- Country: United States
- State: Arizona
- County: Apache

Area
  - Total: 0.56 sq mi (1.46 km^{2})
  - Land: 0.56 sq mi (1.46 km^{2})
  - Water: 0 sq mi (0.00 km^{2})
- Elevation: 8,006 ft (2,440 m)

Population (2020)
  - Total: 146
  - Density: 258.3/sq mi (99.72/km^{2})
- Time zone: UTC-7 (MST)
- ZIP Code: 85920
- Area code: 928
- FIPS code: 04-01920
- GNIS Feature ID: 2582726

Alpine is a census-designated place in Apache County, Arizona, United States, in Bush Valley in the east central part of the state. As of the 2020 census, it had a population of 146. It is located near the eastern border of the state.

== History ==
Located approximately 75 miles south of the Navajo Nation, Alpine was settled in 1876 by Anderson Bush, a European-American who built a log house there. He originally used it as a trading post known as "Fort Bush". Bush sold his holdings in 1879 to William Maxwell and Fred Hamblin, Mormon settlers who established the town as a Mormon community. They named the community for its lofty elevation. Alpine has been affected by the Wallow Fire, the largest wildfire in Arizona's history, which entered New Mexico, burning 538,049 acres in 2011.

The Alpine post office has the ZIP code of 85920.

== Geography ==
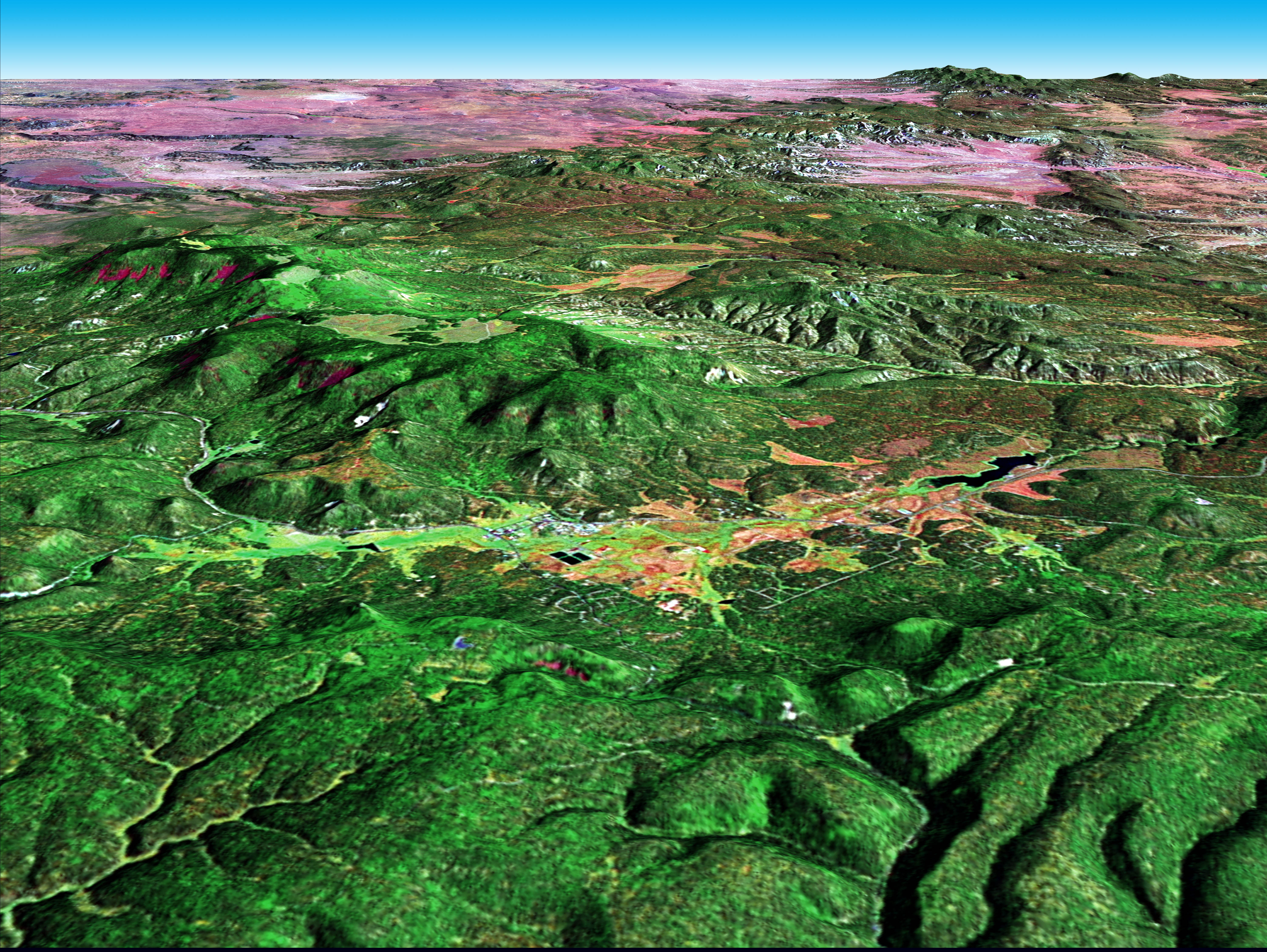
Alpine (center of image); Luna Lake, right center. NASA perspective image created by joining Landsat 7 and Digital Elevation Model data.

Alpine is located at an elevation of 8,050 feet (2,450 m) above sea level in the eastern end of the White Mountains and surrounded by the Apache-Sitgreaves National Forest. Alpine is near the headwaters of the San Francisco River and six miles from the New Mexico border. Alpine is a popular destination for hunting, fishing, and camping. As of 1960, it was the highest place in the United States where farming was successfully conducted. It has the highest golf course in Arizona, Alpine Golf and Country Club at 8,200 feet.

== Demographics ==
Historical population
Census	Pop.	Note	%±
1920	147		—
1930	139		−5.4%
1960	300		—
2010	145		—
2020	146		0.7%
U.S. Decennial Census

Alpine first appeared on the 1900 U.S. Census as the Alpine Precinct of Apache County. 95 residents in 17 households. It also was recorded in 1930. In that census it had a white majority. All county precincts were combined into three districts in 1940. Alpine's population was 165 in 1940. The 1960 census estimated 300 persons. In 2010, it was defined as a census-designated place (CDP).

== Climate ==
Alpine has a warm-summer Mediterranean climate (Köppen Csb) influence by its very high altitude and the North American Monsoon, which brings frequent thunder showers during the summer. Although temperatures are generally comfortable during the daytime, the sun is very intense and at night frosts have occurred even in summer and are an almost daily occurrence from October to May.

Winters are cold, with storms bringing precipitation mostly in the form of snow. Because Alpine is on the eastern end of the Mogollon Rim, it experiences a rain shadow from the White Mountains and receives less snowfall than points west at a similar elevation.

On February 25, 1987, Alpine tied the 24-hour snowfall record for Arizona at 38 inches (96.5 cm); it shares the record with Heber Ranger Station, which first set the record on December 14, 1967.

Climate data for Alpine, Arizona (1991–2020 normals, extremes 1912–present)
Month	Jan	Feb	Mar	Apr	May	Jun	Jul	Aug	Sep	Oct	Nov	Dec	Year
Record high °F (°C)	72 (22)	72 (22)	74 (23)	79 (26)	92 (33)	94 (34)	94 (34)	89 (32)	87 (31)	86 (30)	77 (25)	72 (22)	94 (34)
Mean maximum °F (°C)	57.6 (14.2)	59.4 (15.2)	64.6 (18.1)	70.5 (21.4)	78.2 (25.7)	86.2 (30.1)	86.4 (30.2)	82.4 (28.0)	78.6 (25.9)	73.7 (23.2)	65.6 (18.7)	60.2 (15.7)	87.7 (30.9)
Mean daily maximum °F (°C)	45.6 (7.6)	48.0 (8.9)	53.9 (12.2)	60.6 (15.9)	68.8 (20.4)	78.3 (25.7)	78.5 (25.8)	75.9 (24.4)	71.9 (22.2)	63.8 (17.7)	53.8 (12.1)	46.2 (7.9)	62.1 (16.7)
Daily mean °F (°C)	30.5 (−0.8)	33.2 (0.7)	38.2 (3.4)	43.4 (6.3)	50.1 (10.1)	58.4 (14.7)	62.6 (17.0)	61.2 (16.2)	55.5 (13.1)	46.7 (8.2)	37.8 (3.2)	30.9 (−0.6)	45.7 (7.6)
Mean daily minimum °F (°C)	15.3 (−9.3)	18.4 (−7.6)	22.5 (−5.3)	26.2 (−3.2)	31.5 (−0.3)	38.5 (3.6)	46.7 (8.2)	46.4 (8.0)	39.2 (4.0)	29.6 (−1.3)	21.7 (−5.7)	15.7 (−9.1)	29.3 (−1.5)
Mean minimum °F (°C)	−3.4 (−19.7)	1.6 (−16.9)	8.4 (−13.1)	14.6 (−9.7)	19.3 (−7.1)	27.2 (−2.7)	38.3 (3.5)	39.6 (4.2)	28.2 (−2.1)	16.3 (−8.7)	6.2 (−14.3)	−2.9 (−19.4)	−8.1 (−22.3)
Record low °F (°C)	−32 (−36)	−28 (−33)	−25 (−32)	−6 (−21)	8 (−13)	13 (−11)	27 (−3)	29 (−2)	17 (−8)	−1 (−18)	−18 (−28)	−28 (−33)	−32 (−36)
Average precipitation inches (mm)	1.26 (32)	1.13 (29)	0.92 (23)	0.53 (13)	0.71 (18)	0.83 (21)	3.91 (99)	4.31 (109)	2.34 (59)	1.61 (41)	1.16 (29)	1.44 (37)	20.15 (512)
Average snowfall inches (cm)	10.7 (27)	9.9 (25)	8.2 (21)	1.7 (4.3)	0.5 (1.3)	0.0 (0.0)	0.0 (0.0)	0.0 (0.0)	0.0 (0.0)	1.3 (3.3)	4.6 (12)	7.9 (20)	44.8 (113.9)
Average precipitation days (≥ 0.01 inch)	5.3	4.7	4.4	2.4	3.8	4.2	14.3	14.9	7.8	5.3	2.8	4.6	74.5
Average snowy days (≥ 0.1 inch)	3.7	2.8	2.3	1.1	0.1	0.0	0.0	0.0	0.0	0.6	1.4	3.1	15.1
Source 1: NOAA
Source 2: National Weather Service

== Government and infrastructure ==
The U.S. Postal Service operates the Alpine Post Office on U.S. Route 191.

== Attractions ==
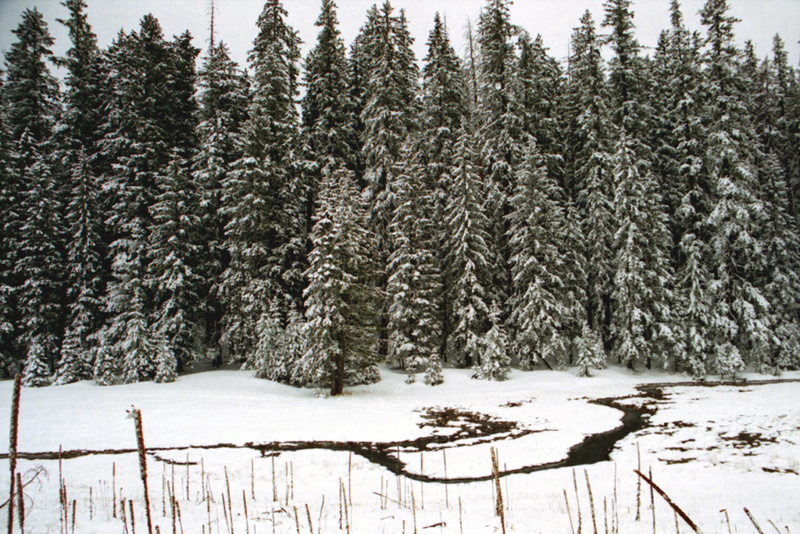
Apache-Sitgreaves National Forest, south of Alpine

- Apache-Sitgreaves National Forest
- The Coronado Trail Scenic Byway, a 120-mile (190 km) segment along U.S. Route 191 (formerly US-666) between Springerville and Clifton, Arizona
- Escudilla Mountain (10,877 ft or 3,315 m), a pine and aspen-covered mesa, popular for hiking, horseback-riding, and viewing fall colors
- Luna Lake, 3 miles (5 km) southeast, a popular fishing and camping spot

== Education ==
The Alpine Elementary School District, operating Alpine Elementary School, serves Alpine.

The Apache County Library District operates the Alpine Public Library.

== Picture gallery ==
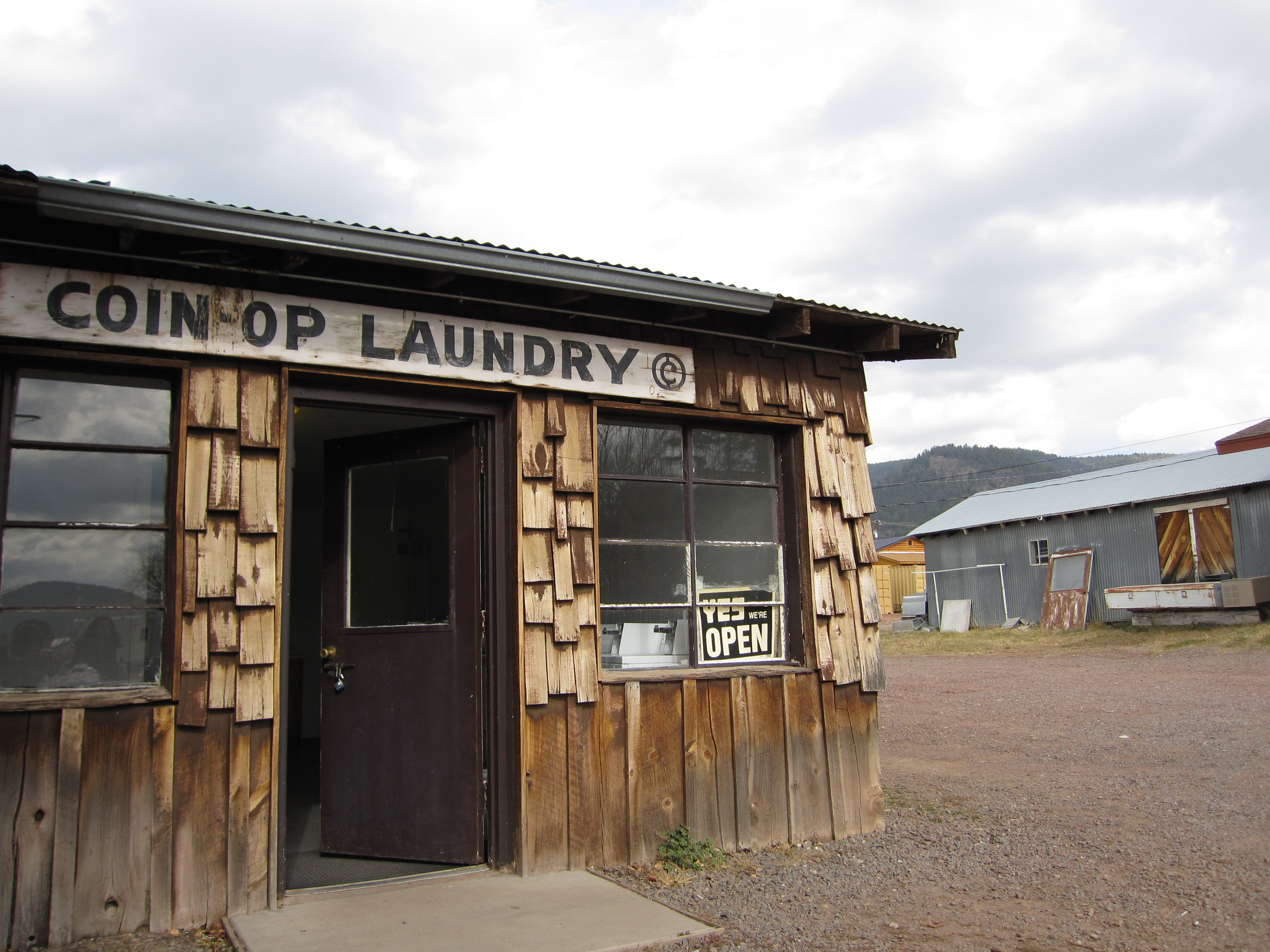
Alpine Country Store

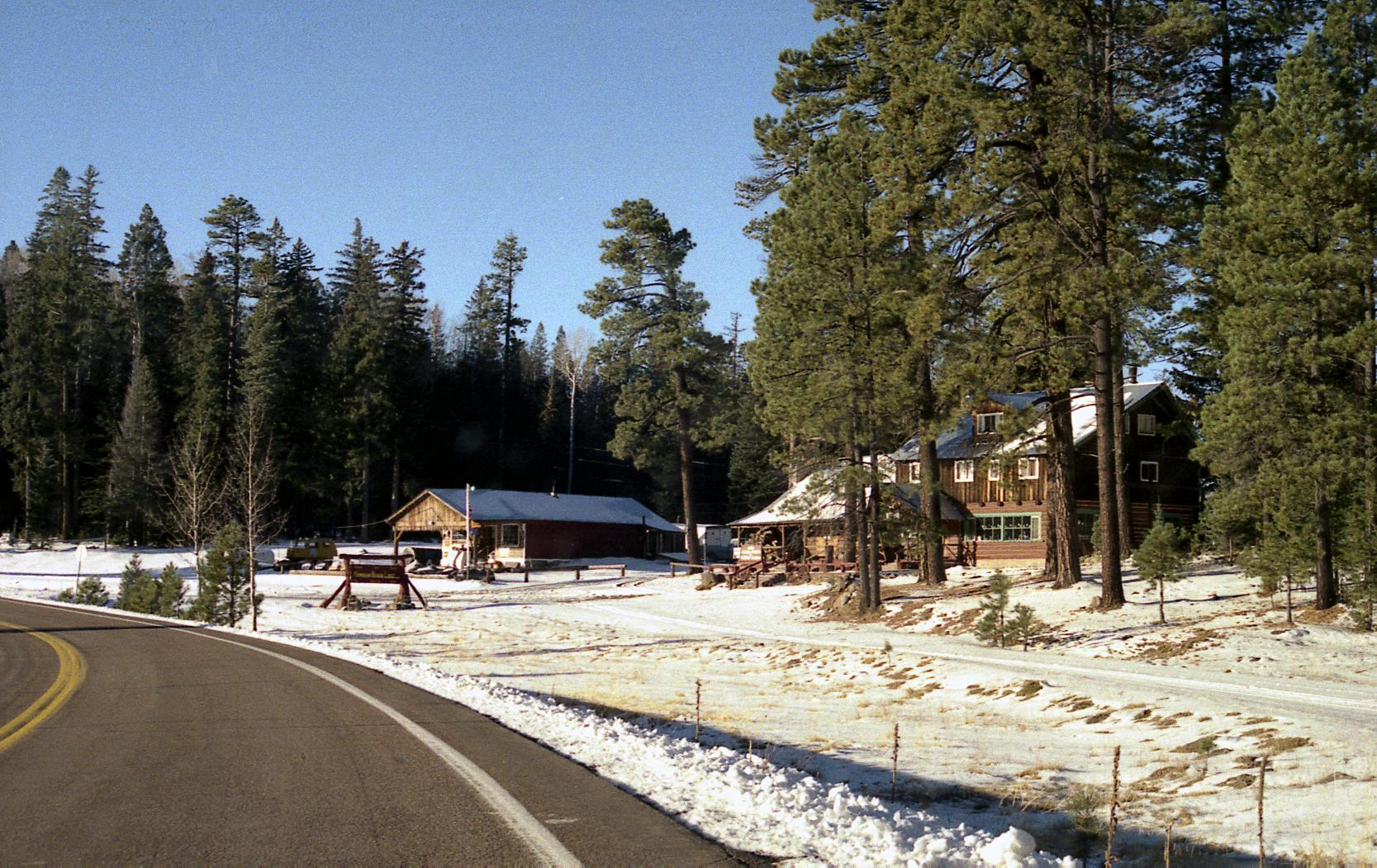
Alpine in November 1990

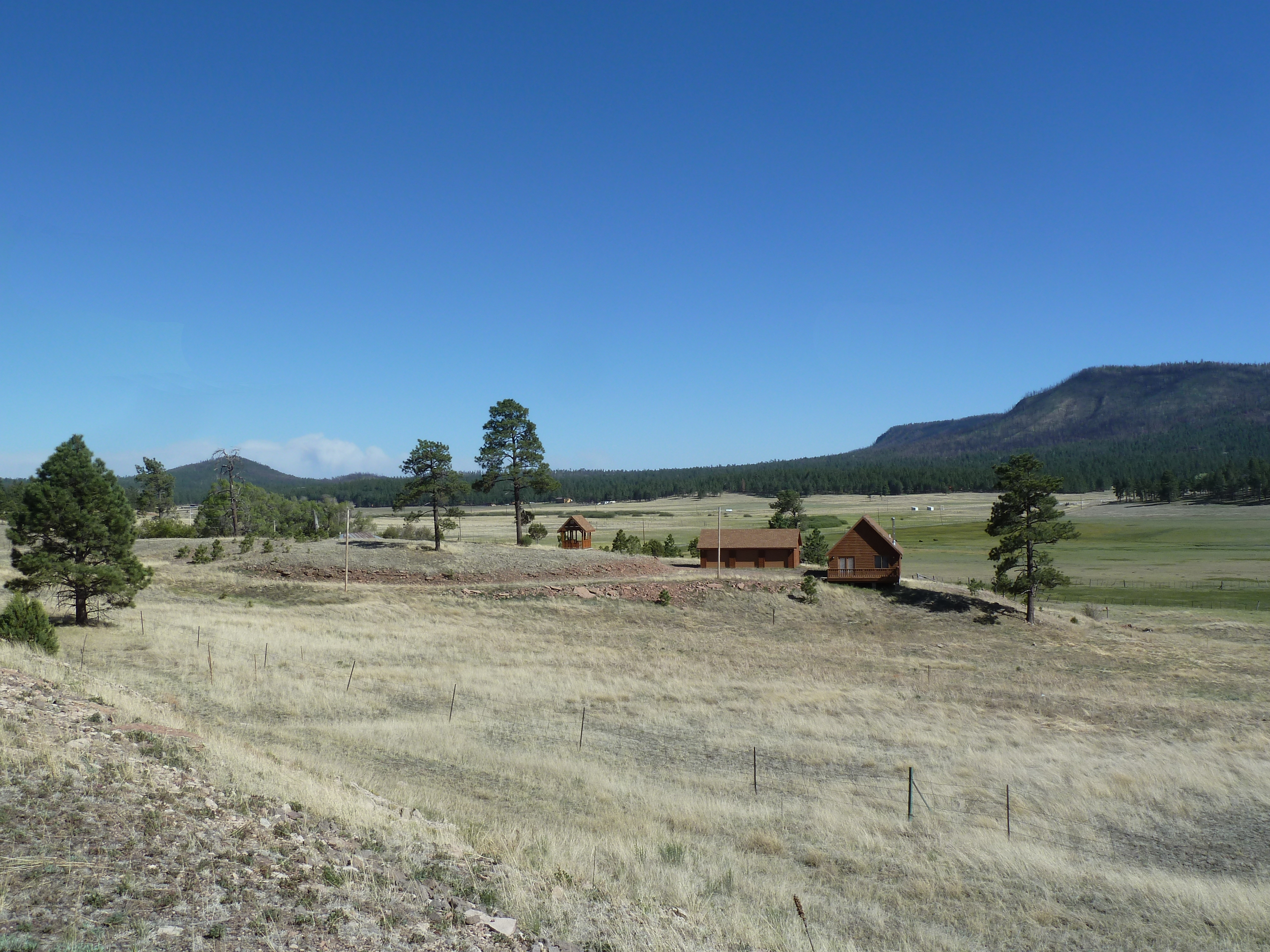
Wallow Fire in 2011

== See also ==
- List of census-designated places in Arizona
- Luna, New Mexico
