= Bellemont, Arizona =

Unincorporated community in Coconino County, Arizona, US

Camp Navajo
- Unincorporated community
- Bellemont, Arizona
- Location within Arizona Location within the United States
- Coordinates: 35°15′00″N 111°49′10″W
- Country: United States
- State: Arizona
- County: Coconino
- Elevation: 7,166 ft (2,184 m)
- Time zone: UTC-7 (Mountain (MST))
- ZIP code: 86015
- Area code: 928
- GNIS feature ID: 2805210

Bellemont is an unincorporated community in Coconino County, Arizona, United States, located along Interstate 40, about 11 miles (18 km) west-northwest of Flagstaff. At an elevation of 7,132 feet (2,174 m), it is claimed to be the highest settlement along historic Route 66. It was a known water stop due to its local springs. As of the 2020 census, Bellemont (a census-designated place) had a population of 1,167.

== History ==
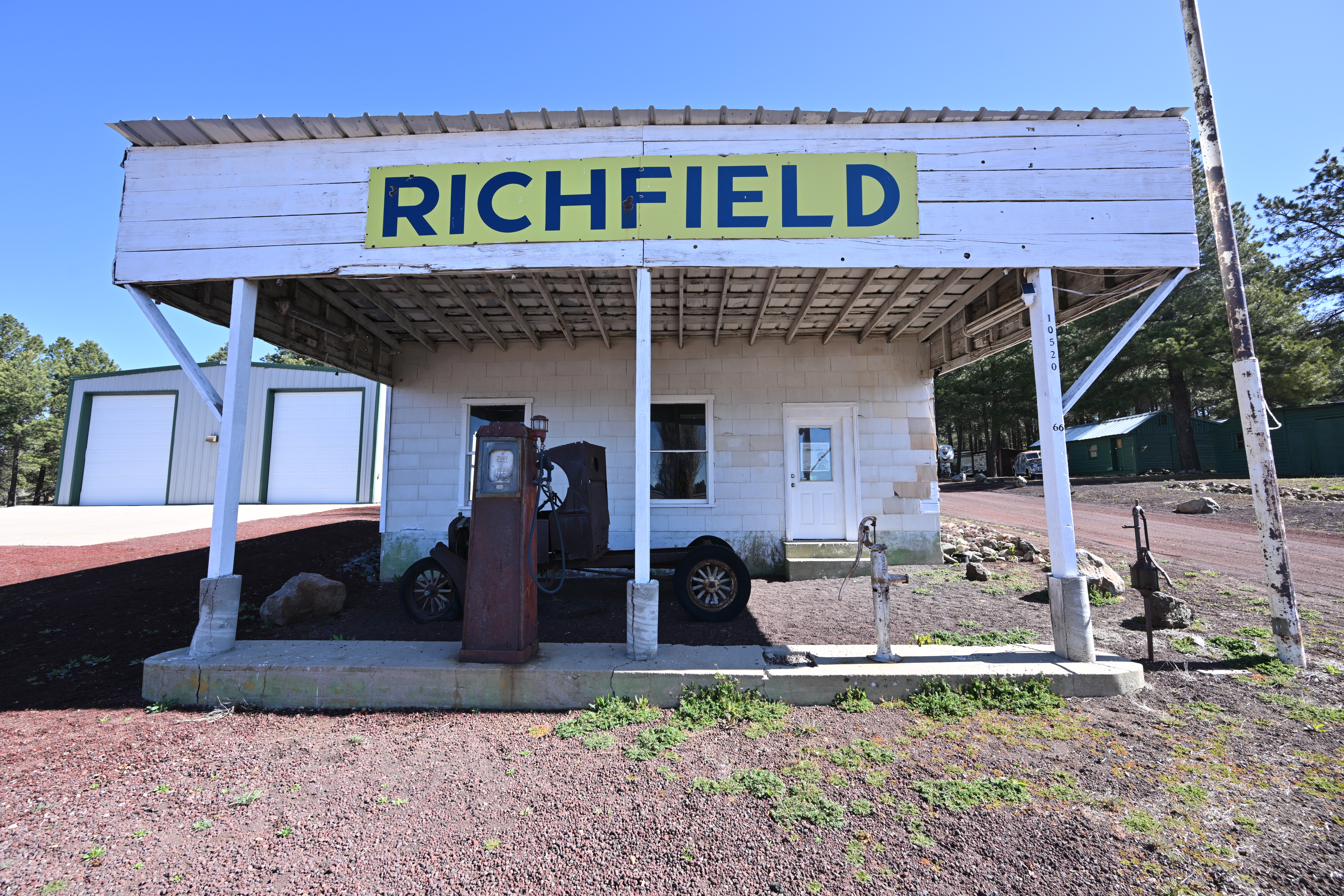
Front of Richfield gas station, on former Route 66

Bellemont's population was 113 in 1940, and 25 in the 1960 census.

On October 6, 2010, Bellemont was struck by three rare strong tornadoes in short succession. The 1st tornado was rated EF2, the second was rated EF3, and the third was rated EF2. The tornadoes made 15 homes uninhabitable, resulting in the evacuation of about 30 people. A train and 30 recreational vehicles were damaged, but no serious injuries or deaths were reported.

On May 13, 2019, actor Issac Kappy committed suicide by jumping off the Hughes Ave./Transwestern Rd. overpass for Interstate 40 in Bellemont, then being struck by a passing car on the eastbound side.

== Climate ==
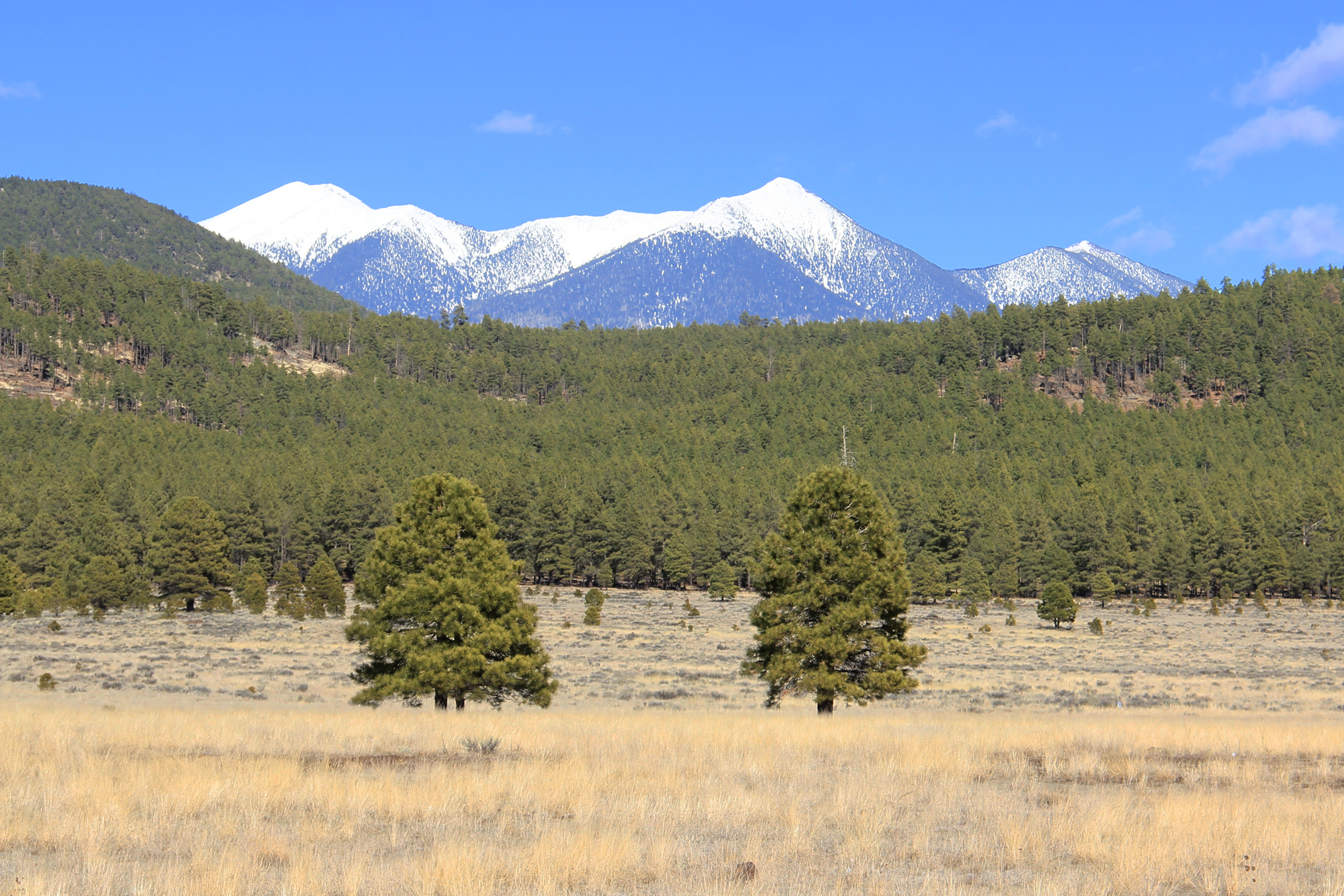
A field in Bellemont, Arizona

The Bellemont region experiences warm (but not hot) and dry summers, with no average monthly temperatures above 71.6 °F (22.0 °C). It has an average 248.6 days per year with low temperatures below 32 °F (0 °C). According to the Köppen Climate Classification system, Bellemont has a continental climate (abbreviated "Dsb" on climate maps).

The Flagstaff field office of the National Weather Service is in Bellemont.

Climate data for Bellemont, Arizona, 1991–2020 normals, extremes 1999–present
Month	Jan	Feb	Mar	Apr	May	Jun	Jul	Aug	Sep	Oct	Nov	Dec	Year
Record high °F (°C)	64 (18)	67 (19)	73 (23)	81 (27)	87 (31)	96 (36)	96 (36)	92 (33)	91 (33)	81 (27)	73 (23)	65 (18)	96 (36)
Mean maximum °F (°C)	56.0 (13.3)	58.7 (14.8)	65.7 (18.7)	73.5 (23.1)	80.1 (26.7)	89.7 (32.1)	89.6 (32.0)	86.6 (30.3)	82.7 (28.2)	75.5 (24.2)	69.0 (20.6)	59.5 (15.3)	91.4 (33.0)
Mean daily maximum °F (°C)	43.9 (6.6)	45.6 (7.6)	52.6 (11.4)	58.7 (14.8)	68.1 (20.1)	78.9 (26.1)	81.6 (27.6)	79.2 (26.2)	74.0 (23.3)	63.8 (17.7)	52.5 (11.4)	43.7 (6.5)	61.9 (16.6)
Daily mean °F (°C)	27.6 (−2.4)	30.5 (−0.8)	36.4 (2.4)	41.4 (5.2)	48.8 (9.3)	57.4 (14.1)	64.0 (17.8)	62.6 (17.0)	55.7 (13.2)	45.3 (7.4)	35.4 (1.9)	27.5 (−2.5)	44.4 (6.9)
Mean daily minimum °F (°C)	11.3 (−11.5)	15.4 (−9.2)	20.2 (−6.6)	24.0 (−4.4)	29.5 (−1.4)	35.9 (2.2)	46.4 (8.0)	45.9 (7.7)	37.3 (2.9)	26.8 (−2.9)	18.2 (−7.7)	11.3 (−11.5)	26.9 (−2.9)
Mean minimum °F (°C)	−9.5 (−23.1)	−6.1 (−21.2)	4.2 (−15.4)	11.8 (−11.2)	19.5 (−6.9)	25.8 (−3.4)	36.4 (2.4)	36.7 (2.6)	26.3 (−3.2)	15.4 (−9.2)	2.9 (−16.2)	−9.5 (−23.1)	−15.2 (−26.2)
Record low °F (°C)	−30 (−34)	−21 (−29)	−7 (−22)	−6 (−21)	12 (−11)	22 (−6)	28 (−2)	26 (−3)	18 (−8)	2 (−17)	−9 (−23)	−21 (−29)	−30 (−34)
Average precipitation inches (mm)	1.97 (50)	2.17 (55)	1.77 (45)	1.05 (27)	0.69 (18)	0.29 (7.4)	2.66 (68)	3.23 (82)	1.77 (45)	1.57 (40)	1.23 (31)	1.76 (45)	20.16 (513.4)
Average snowfall inches (cm)	16.6 (42)	16.8 (43)	11.6 (29)	4.7 (12)	1.6 (4.1)	0.0 (0.0)	0.0 (0.0)	0.0 (0.0)	0.0 (0.0)	1.3 (3.3)	5.5 (14)	14.5 (37)	72.6 (184.4)
Average extreme snow depth inches (cm)	12.2 (31)	10.0 (25)	7.8 (20)	2.5 (6.4)	0.7 (1.8)	0.0 (0.0)	0.0 (0.0)	0.0 (0.0)	0.0 (0.0)	0.0 (0.0)	2.8 (7.1)	10.1 (26)	16.4 (42)
Average precipitation days (≥ 0.01 in)	7.0	7.1	6.1	4.8	3.9	2.5	13.8	13.2	7.1	5.6	4.4	7.0	82.5
Average snowy days (≥ 0.1 in)	5.8	6.4	4.9	2.9	1.0	0.0	0.0	0.0	0.0	0.5	2.6	6.1	30.2
Source 1: NOAA
Source 2: National Weather Service (mean maxima/minima, snow depth 2006–2020)

== Demographics ==
=== 2020 census ===
As of the 2020 census, Bellemont had a population of 1,167. The median age was 31.6 years. 30.0% of residents were under the age of 18 and 8.0% of residents were 65 years of age or older. For every 100 females there were 106.5 males, and for every 100 females age 18 and over there were 106.8 males age 18 and over.

0.0% of residents lived in urban areas, while 100.0% lived in rural areas.

There were 417 households in Bellemont, of which 40.5% had children under the age of 18 living in them. Of all households, 63.5% were married-couple households, 15.1% were households with a male householder and no spouse or partner present, and 10.6% were households with a female householder and no spouse or partner present. About 16.6% of all households were made up of individuals and 4.3% had someone living alone who was 65 years of age or older.

There were 453 housing units, of which 7.9% were vacant. The homeowner vacancy rate was 0.0% and the rental vacancy rate was 11.9%.

Racial composition as of the 2020 census
Race	Number	Percent
White	849	72.8%
Black or African American	5	0.4%
American Indian and Alaska Native	66	5.7%
Asian	32	2.7%
Native Hawaiian and Other Pacific Islander	2	0.2%
Some other race	87	7.5%
Two or more races	126	10.8%
Hispanic or Latino (of any race)	227	19.5%

== Education ==
It is in the Flagstaff Unified School District.

The zoned secondary schools are Mount Elden Middle School and Flagstaff High School.

== See also ==
- Media related to Bellemont, Arizona at Wikimedia Commons
- Camp Navajo
