= List of lakes of Arizona =

This is a list of notable lakes and reservoirs located in the U.S. state of Arizona. Many of the lakes listed here contain game fish and are managed by the Arizona Game and Fish Department. Some may dry out or freeze out fish, and require seasonal restocking. Most lakes will not allow large motorboats.

Due to Arizona's dry climate, many listed here are intermittent lakes and do not contain water throughout the entire year. Swimming, fishing, and/or boating are permitted in some of these lakes, but not all.

== List of Arizona lakes ==
- Alamo Lake
- Ackre Lake
- Apache Lake
- Ashurst Lake
- Bartlett Lake
- Bear Canyon Lake
- Becker Lake
- Bekihatso
- Big Lake
- Black Canyon Lake
- Blue Ridge Reservoir
- Bunch Reservoir
- Canyon Lake
- Carnero Lake
- Cataract Lake
- Chevelon Canyon Lake
- Childs-Irving Hydroelectric Facilities (Stehr Lake)
- Clear Creek Reservoir
- Cluff Ranch Ponds
- Coconino Reservoir
- Concho Lake
- Crescent Lake
- Dankworth Pond
- Deadhorse Lake
- Dogtown Reservoir
- Earl Park Lake
- Fain Lake
- Fool Hollow Lake
- Frye Mesa Reservoir
- Goldwater Lake
- Granite Basin Lake
- Lake Havasu
- Hawley Lake
- Horseshoe Cienega Lake
- Horseshoe Lake
- Horsethief Basin Lake
- Hulsey Lake
- Imperial Reservoir
- J. D. Dam Lake
- Kaibab Lake
- Kennedy Lake
- Kinnikinick Lake
- Knoll Lake
- Lake Havasu
- Lake Mead
- Lake Mohave
- Lake Powell
- Lee Valley Lake
- Long Lake
- Luna Lake
- Lyman Reservoir
- Lynx Lake
- Martinez Lake
- Lake Mary (Lower)
- Lake Mary (Upper)
- McClelland Lake
- Mittry Lake
- Mormon Lake
- Nelson Reservoir
- Painted Rock Reservoir
- Parker Canyon Lake
- Patagonia Lake
- Pecks Lake (Verde Valley)
- Peña Blanca Lake
- Perkins Tank
- Picacho Reservoir
- Lake Pleasant Regional Park (Lake Pleasant)
- Lake Powell
- Rainbow Lake
- Red Lake, on the border with New Mexico
- Riggs Flat Lake
- River Reservoir
- Roper Lake
- Rose Canyon Lake
- Russel Tank
- Saguaro Lake
- San Carlos Lake
- Santa Fe Lake
- Scott Reservoir
- Show Low Lake
- Soldiers Annex Lake
- Soldiers Lake
- Stoneman Lake
- Tempe Town Lake
- Theodore Roosevelt Lake
- Topock Marsh
- Tunnel Reservoir
- Watson Lake
- Whitehorse Lake
- White Mountain Lake
- Willcox Playa
- Willow Springs Lake
- Woodland Reservoir
- Woods Canyon Lake

== Metropolitan Phoenix lakes ==
There are 18 lakes in the Urban Lake system. They are stocked with sports fish seasonally.

- Alvord Lake
- Canal
- Chaparral Lake
- Cortez Lake
- Desert Breeze Lake
- Desert West
- Encanto
- Kiwanis Lake
- Papago Ponds
- Red Mountain
- Rio Vista
- Riverview
- Surprise Lake
- Water Ranch

== Tucson area lakes ==
- Kennedy
- Lakeside
- Sahuarita
- Silverbell

== Town of Payson lakes ==
- Green Valley Lake
