= Northern Arizona =

Region of the US state of Arizona

Coordinates: 33.5°N 112.9°W

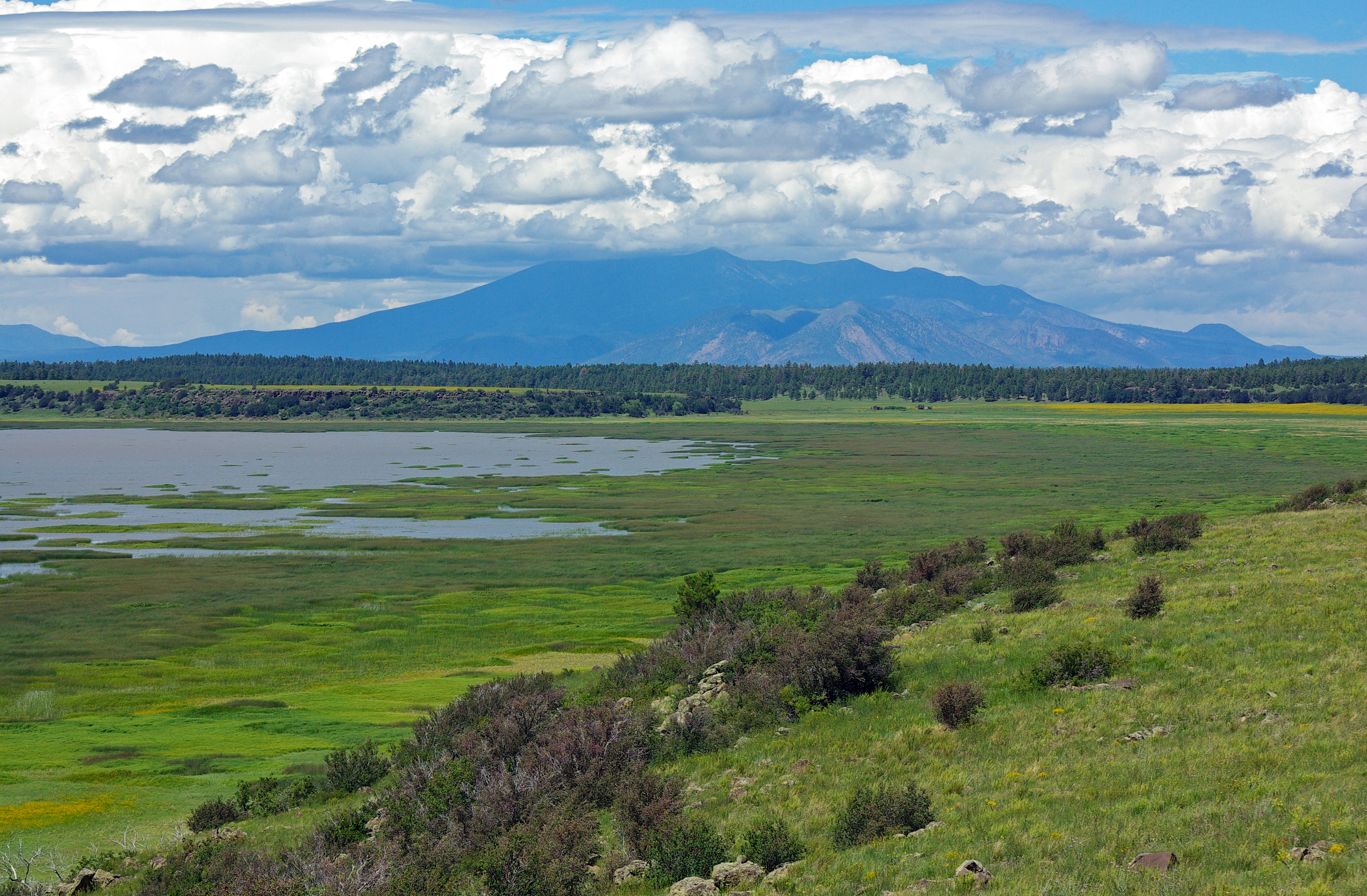
Summer monsoon clouds over the San Francisco Peaks, viewed from Mormon Lake

Northern Arizona is an unofficial, colloquially defined region of the U.S. state of Arizona. Generally consisting of Apache, Coconino, Mohave, Navajo, and Yavapai counties, the region is geographically dominated by the Colorado Plateau, the southern border of which in Arizona is called the Mogollon Rim.

== Demographics ==
Flagstaff is the largest city in northern Arizona. Other cities include Sedona, Page, Prescott, Payson, and Williams.

Much of the territory is National Forest Service land, parkland, or other BLM-administered lands. In the north-east are large Hopi and Navajo reservations, parts of which overlap, leading to occasional territorial disputes. Native Americans make up 48% of the population in Coconino County, Navajo County, and Apache County. Ruins of the ancient Anasazi, Sinagua, and other Puebloan people can be found in northern Arizona.

Most Northern Arizona University students are Arizonans, with 66% being Arizona residents.

== Geography ==
The land of northern Arizona was once covered by shallow seas. The region features several mountain ranges, including the state's highest, the San Francisco Peaks. It also contains most of the state's natural lakes. In the east lies the White Mountain range. The Grand Canyon is in the west. The central portion of northern Arizona has the Painted Desert.

The area is known for its rugged landscape and variety of environment. Northern Arizona is home to millions of acres of ponderosa pine, aspen, and mixed-conifer forests, including the largest ponderosa pine forest in North America. Attractions in addition to the Grand Canyon include Monument Valley, Canyon de Chelly, the Painted Desert, and Meteor Crater. The major highway is Interstate 40 (roughly following the historic Route 66) which connects the larger cities of this region. Northern Arizona also goes by the name Alta Arizona, which means "Upper Arizona" in Spanish. Northern Arizona has a large Mormon population, with a temple in Snowflake.

Northern Arizona consists of five different counties:

- Mohave County
- Coconino County
- Navajo County
- Apache County
- Yavapai County

Northern Arizona has various points of interest. The area is known for its variety of outdoor recreation opportunities, hiking trails and forest service roads, extreme topographical and environmental variability, and its geologic and human history. The following is a list of popular attractions in northern Arizona.

National Parks and Monuments

- Grand Canyon National Park
- Petrified Forest National Park
- Canyon de Chelly National Monument
- Grand Canyon-Parashant National Monument
- Navajo National Monument
- Sunset Crater Volcano National Monument
- Walnut Canyon National Monument
- Wupatki National Monument
- Vermillion Cliffs National Monument

Natural attractions

- Monument Valley
- Painted Desert
- Oak Creek Canyon
- Slide Rock State Park
- San Francisco Peaks
- Red Rock Country
- Lava River Cave
- San Francisco Volcanic Field
- Window Rock
- Antelope Canyon

Other attractions

- Arizona Snowbowl
- Lowell Observatory
- Grand Canyon Railway
- Museum of Northern Arizona
- Northern Arizona University
- Four Corners Monument
- Jerome

== Subregions ==
=== Northeast Arizona ===
Northeast Arizona commonly includes Apache County and Navajo County. Some notable towns there are St. Johns, Eagar, Holbrook, Show Low, Winslow, Window Rock, Fort Defiance, Ganado, Chinle, and Kayenta.

It is the location of several Indian reservations including all of the Zuni Indian Reservation and most parts of the Hopi Reservation, the Navajo Nation, and the Fort Apache Indian Reservation. The rugged desert landscape of Northeast Arizona has been inhabited by indigenous peoples since at least the construction of what are now the ruins at Monument Valley, Navajo National Monument, and Canyon de Chelly National Monument.

Northeast Arizona is arid, largely free of greenery, and characterized by hills, mesas, buttes, cliffs, and canyons. The windy stony plains of the Petrified Forest National Park exhibits parts of the barren colorful Painted Desert as well as preserved Native American petroglyphs. Northeast Arizona is also home to the Apache-Sitgreaves National Forest and Four Corners Monument.

=== Arizona Strip ===
The Arizona Strip is the segment of Arizona to the north of the Colorado River. Geographically isolated from the rest of the state, it has fewer than 10,000 people.

== See also ==
- Arizona Trail
- North Central Arizona, a list-class article
