= Mogollon Plateau =

Landform of the Colorado Plateau in the western United States

Coordinates: 34°29′N 110°48′W

The Mogollon Plateau or Mogollon Mesa (/mʌɡɪˈjoʊn/ or /moʊɡəˈjoʊn/) is a pine-covered southern plateau section of the larger Colorado Plateau in east-central Arizona and west-central New Mexico, United States. The southern boundary of the plateau is the Mogollon Rim. The Mogollon Plateau is 7,000–8,000 feet (2,100–2,400 m) high. The plateau lends its name to the Mogollon tribe, part of the Cochise-Mogollan peoples who inhabited this and nearby areas from 5,000 to 2,500 years ago. Their descendants are believed to include the Anasazi.

== Lakes ==
At the south and southwest of the plateau, bordering the Mogollon Rim numerous lakes occur. At the east near Show Low, Arizona, is Little Mormon Lake, Whipple Lake, Long Lake, and Fool Hollow Lake. At the western plateau region, are Soldier Lake, Tremaine Lake, Soldier Annex Lake, and Stoneman Lake further west. Just south is Blue Ridge Reservoir on East Clear Creek. Eastwards, just west of the center of the plateau, and southwards, adjacent the Rim are: Knoll Lake, Bear Canyon Lake, Woods Canyon Lake, Willow Springs Lake, and Black Canyon Lake; just north of this lake group, on Chevelon Creek (Chevelon Canyon), is Chevelon Canyon Lake. Numerous washes, or creeks trend north on the plateau from the Mogollon Rim; at the west they trend more northeast, towards the Painted Desert region.

=== Wilderness areas ===
Three wilderness areas also trend westwards from the west-(west-southwest) area of the Mogollon Plateau. The southern one, Fossil Springs Wilderness, is more closely associated with the Mogollon Rim. The two north of it, and also running due-westwards in parallel creeks to Fossil Creek of the Fossil Springs Wilderness, are the West Clear Creek Wilderness, and the Wet Beaver Wilderness.

== See also ==
- Intermontane Plateaus
- Mogollon culture
- Sitgreaves National Forest
