= Rainbow Lake =

Rainbow Lake or Rainbow Lakes may refer to:

== Geography ==
=== Canada ===
- Rainbow Lake, Alberta

=== United States ===
- Rainbow Lake (Arizona)
- Rainbow Lake (White Cloud Mountains) in Custer County, Idaho
- Rainbow Lake (Maine)
- Rainbow Lake (Waterford Township, Michigan)
- Rainbow Lake (Montana) near Plains
- Rainbow Lakes, New Jersey, a census-designated place
  - Rainbow Lake (New Jersey), the cluster of water bodies within the CDP
- Rainbow Lake (New York), northern Adirondacks
- Rainbow Lake Wilderness, Bayfield County, Wisconsin
- Rainbow Lakes Estates, Florida
- Rainbow Lake in the Alpine Lakes Wilderness, part of the Island Lakes, Washington
