= Coconino Reservoir =

Waterbody in Coconino National Forest, Arizona

- Location within Arizona
- Location: Coconino County, Arizona, United States
- Coordinates: 35°00′15.2″N 111°23′57.8″W
- Type: Reservoir
- Basin countries: United States
- Surface area: 5 acres (2 ha)
- Average depth: 7 ft (2.1 m)
- Surface elevation: 7,130 ft (2,170 m)

Coconino Reservoir is located near Flagstaff in North Central Arizona and is just half mile south of Ashurst Lake. Recreational facilities are maintained under the authority of the Coconino National Forest.

== Fish species ==
- Rainbow Trout
- Northern Pike
