= Silver Bell =

Silver Bell may refer to:

- Halesia, a deciduous tree
- Lanark Silver Bell, a horse racing trophy
- Silver Bell (album), an album by Patty Griffin
- Silver Bell Mountains, a mountain range in Pima County, Arizona
- Silver Bell, Arizona, a populated place in Pima County, Arizona
  - Silverbell artifacts, artifacts found near Tucson, Arizona
  - Silverbell Lake, a lake near Tucson
- Silver Bell Estates, Alberta

See also

- Silver Bells
