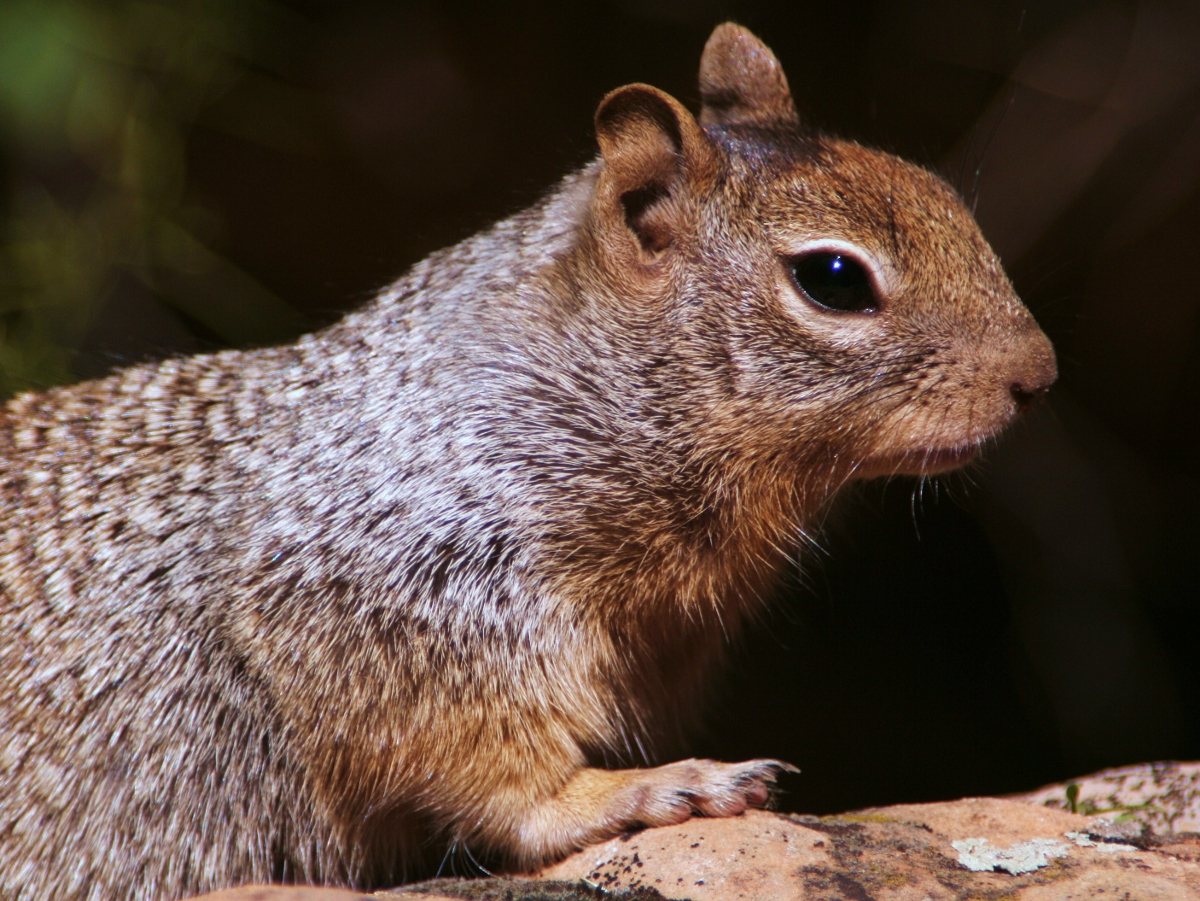

Conservation status
- Least Concern (IUCN 3.1)

Scientific classification
- Kingdom: Animalia
- Phylum: Chordata
- Class: Mammalia
- Order: Rodentia
- Family: Sciuridae
- Genus: Otospermophilus
- Species: O. variegatus

Binomial name
- Otospermophilus variegatus (Erxleben, 1777)

Synonyms
- Spermophilus variegatus

= Rock squirrel =

Species of rodent

The rock squirrel (Otospermophilus variegatus) is a species of rodent in the family Sciuridae. It is native to Mexico and the Southwestern United States, including southern Nevada, Utah, Colorado, Arizona, New Mexico, Texas, and the panhandle of Oklahoma.

In Texas, they can be found in the western, central and Panhandle regions. They are especially common in the Texas Hill Country, a Subregion in central Texas.

== Characteristics ==
Rock squirrels are one of the largest members of the family Scuridae, with adults measuring up to 21 inches (53 cm) in length. In front and on top, the squirrel's coat is a speckled grayish brown; on the rear and bottom, the gray becomes a more mottled brownish-black tone. They have a marked light-colored ring around their eyes and pointed ears that project well above their heads. Rock squirrels have a long, bushy tail with white edges.

Alarm call

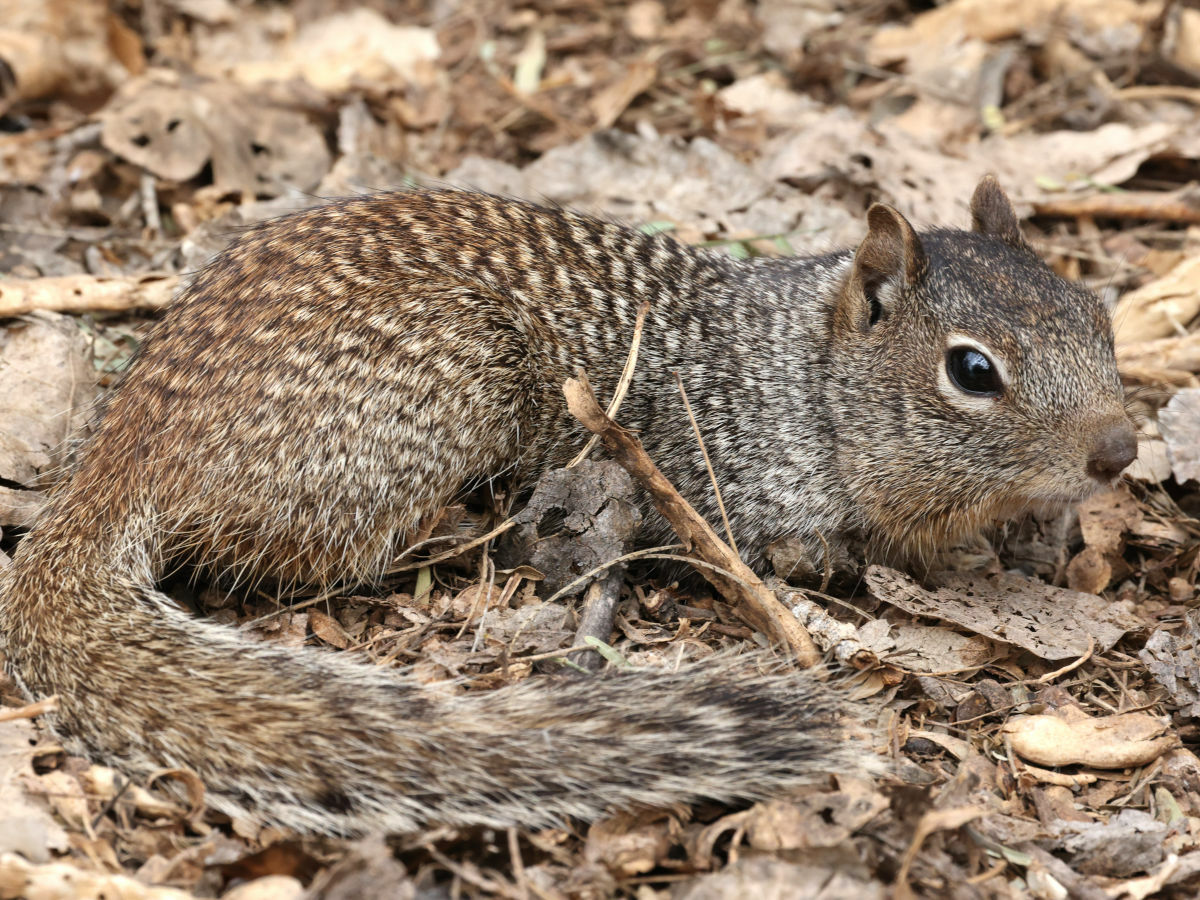
at Water Ranch Lake, AZ

== Life history/behavior ==
The female rock squirrel has two litters a year, with three to nine young in each litter. The first litter is typically born from April to June, while the second is born in August or September. They are active in the early morning and late afternoons when the weather is warm; when very hot, they may estivate. They are social, and live in colonies with several females and one dominant male that fights other mature males to protect the group. Subordinate males lurk at the outer boundaries of the group. Rock squirrels dig burrows with their sharp claws and muscular legs. The burrows provide shelter, safety, living space, and food storage. Burrow systems can be complex and lengthy, as they are enlarged over a period of years. Entrances are usually hidden beneath rocks and can be wider than 3 inches. In the northern reach of their habitat, rock squirrels hibernate during the colder months of the year. In southern areas, rock squirrels may not hibernate at all. They can withstand long periods of time without water, some even up to 100 days. When alarmed, they whistle a short, sharp, oscillating call.

== Diet ==
The rock squirrel is predominantly a herbivore, eating mostly leaves, stems, and seeds, and occasionally invertebrates and small vertebrates. They also eat acorns, pine nuts, fruits of native plants, assorted grasses, mesquite, juniper berries, agaves and cacti. The primary invertebrates include grasshoppers, beetles and earthworms and the vertebrates include young wild turkeys and other fowl. The rock squirrel may eat their own kind, scavenging the remains of squirrels that are already dead. Its diet changes with the seasons, accustoming itself to what is available locally.

Rock squirrels forage for their food on a daily basis, by climbing trees and bushes or on the ground. They collect generous amounts of food items in their cheek pouches, which are quite large. One researcher counted 62 Gambel's oak acorns carried in one squirrel's pouch. These foraging trips are generally short-lived, usually only lasting about 12 minutes. Most foraging is done in the morning, to avoid the hotter parts of the day. They eat some of the food right away and bring a significant portion back to a lookout point or burrow, where they can safely consume or store the rest.

== Predators ==
A variety of snakes (such as western rattlesnakes and eastern pine snakes), birds of prey (such as golden eagles), and other mammals (bobcats, ringtails, gray foxes, raccoons, coyotes, badgers, domestic cats and dogs) prey upon the rock squirrel. Humans have also been known to eat rock squirrels, but can also view them as pests, resulting in lethal and nonlethal removal. The rock squirrel displays a variety of antipredator behaviors. When close to a snake, they make menacing movements and even throw debris at the snake. They often feed, rest, and sunbathe in trees, high rocks, and stumps. This allows them to watch for predators and to communicate alarm calls to other squirrels. They also emit musky scent from their anal glands when disturbed by predators.

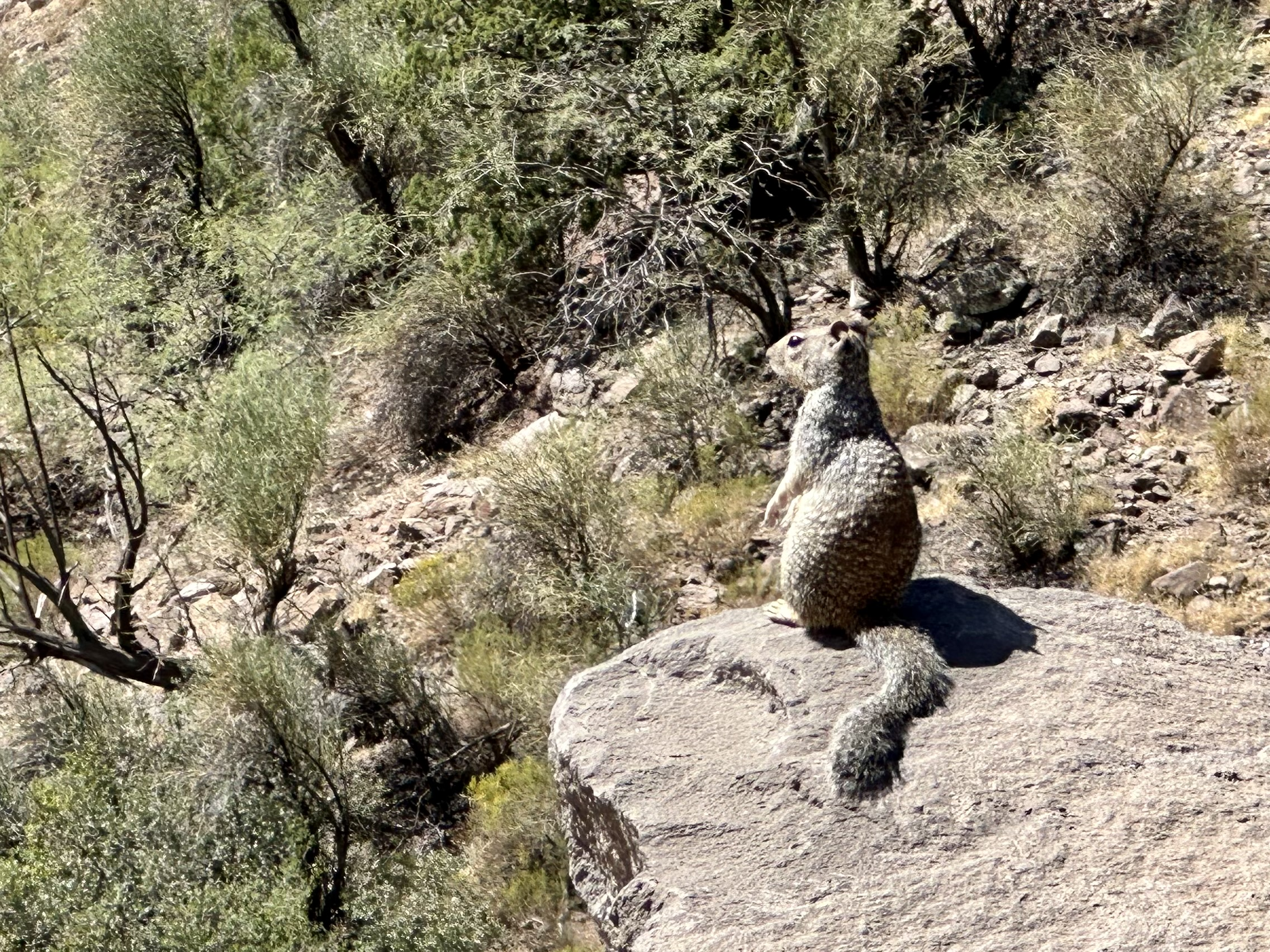
A Rock Squirrel in its natural environment along the Verde River in Arizona.

== Geographic Range ==
Because of their specialized habitat requirements, there are only a few states in the US where these creatures can sustain themselves. These squirrels inhabit rocky mountains, canyon walls, cliffs, and steep rocky hills and only a few areas within North America contain such landscapes. These squirrels can be found throughout the southern US border along with Mexico in states like California, Arizona, Utah, Colorado, Oklahoma, New Mexico and parts of Texas. Contrary to popular belief, in Mexico these squirrels are not found in eastern coastal lowlands, but they inhabit areas of Jalisco, Guerrero, Guanajuato, Mexico, Morelos, Colima and Puebla. In the western edge of the range of these squirrels in the US, they mostly inhabit parts of southeasternmost corners of California, which includes some of the most arid areas in the entire state.

== Sources ==
- Oaks, Emily C.; Kirkland, Gordon L.; Schmidt, David F.; Young, Paul J. (27 February 1987). "Spermophilus Variegatus (Erxleben, 1777): Rock Squirrel". Mammalian Species (272). The American Society of Mammalogists. doi:10.2307/3503949. JSTOR 3503949.
- Marsh, Rex E. (1994). "Belding's, California, and Rock Ground Squirrels". In Hygnstrom, Scott E.; Timm, Robert M.; Larson, Gary E. (eds.). Prevention and Control of Wildlife Damage. University of Nebraska-Lincoln.
