= Surprise Lake =

Surprise Lake or Lake Surprise may refer to:

== Places ==
=== Australia ===
- Lake Surprise (Western Australia), a lake of Western Australia

=== Canada ===
- Surprise Lake (Roy River), Quebec
- Surprise Lake (Vancouver Island), British Columbia

=== New Zealand ===
- Lake Surprise (New Zealand), Tongariro National Park, North Island

=== United States ===
- Surprise Lake (Arizona), Surprise, Arizona
- Surprise Lake (Idaho), Elmore County, Idaho
- Surprise Lake, Abram S. Hewitt State Forest, West Milford, New Jersey
- Surprise Lake (Washington), Milton, Washington
- Surprise Lake (Teton County, Wyoming), a lake in Grand Teton National Park
- Surprise Lake, a lake in the caldera atop Mount Aniakchak, Alaska
- Lake Surprise (Watchung Reservation, New Jersey), a reservoir on the Blue Brook in Watchung Reservation in New Jersey

== Other uses ==
- Surprise Lake Camp, a non-profit sleepaway camp in Cold Spring, New York
