= Santa Fe Lake (Arizona) =

- Location within Arizona
- Location: Gilbert, Arizona, United States
- Coordinates: 35°14′25″N 112°11′06″W
- Type: reservoir, natural lake
- Basin countries: United States
- Surface area: 3 acres (1.2 ha)
- Average depth: 15 ft (4.6 m)
- Surface elevation: 2,092 m (6,864 ft)
- Settlements: Gilbert, Arizona

Santa Fe Lake is a reservoir in 0.5 mi (0.80 km) south of downtown Williams in North Central Arizona. The reservoir is behind Santa Fe Dam, built in red sandstone. It is named after the Atchison, Topeka, and Santa Fe Railway, which stored the reservoir's water for its steam locomotives traveling through Williams. It is supplied by Cataract Creek, which is dry below the reservoir most of the time.
