= McClelland Lake =

Lake in Coconino County, Arizona

- Location within Arizona Location within the United States
- Location: Coconino County, Arizona, United States
- Coordinates: 35°13′16″N 112°17′6″W
- Basin countries: United States
- Surface area: 15 acres (6.1 ha)
- Average depth: 15 ft (4.6 m)
- Surface elevation: 7,000 ft (2,100 m)

McClelland Lake is located near Williams in North Central Arizona, United States.

== Fish species ==
- Largemouth Bass
- Crappie
- Sunfish
- Catfish (Channel)
- Northern Pike
- Yellow Perch
