= J. D. Dam Lake =

Waterbody in Coconino County, Arizona

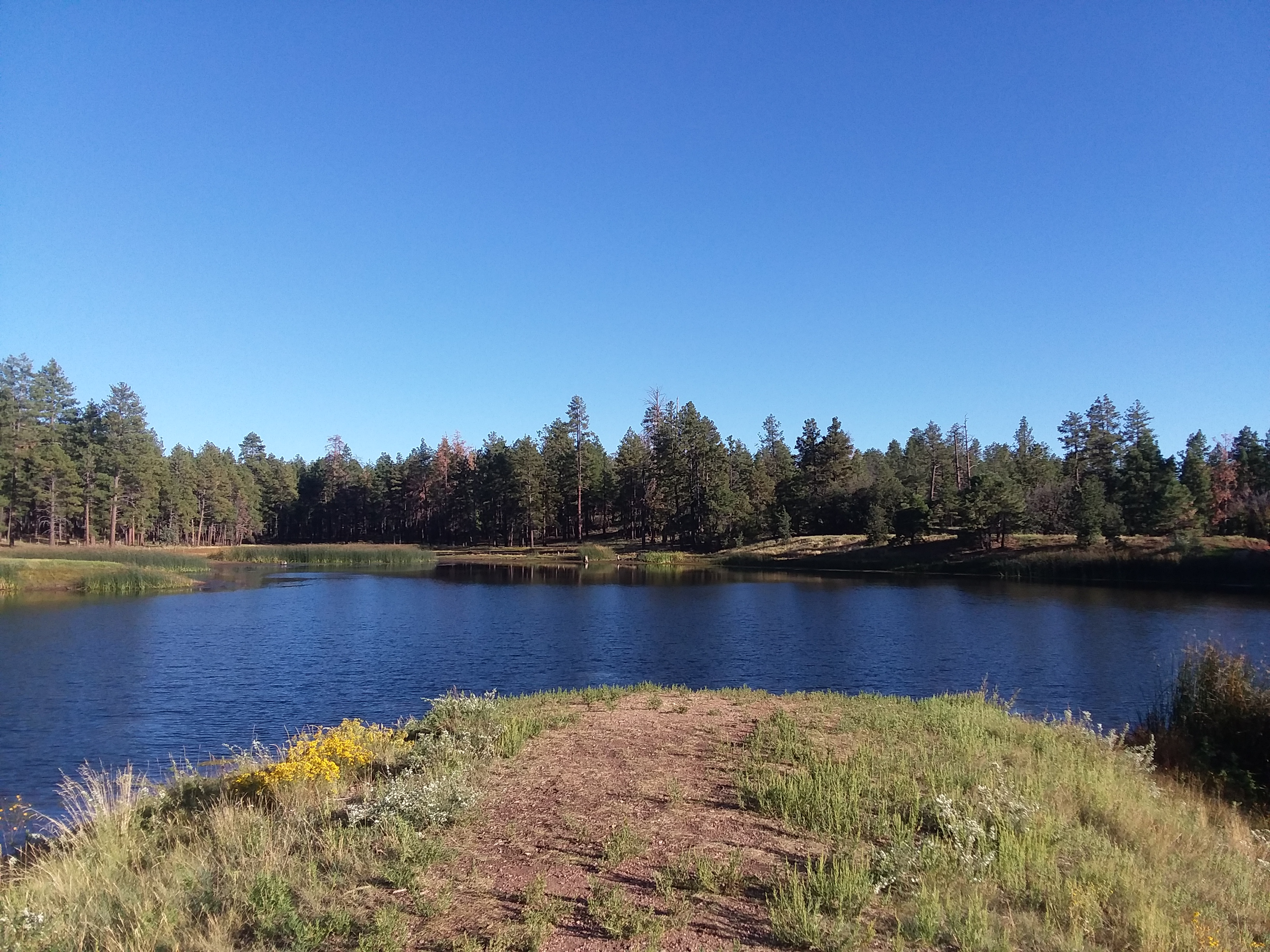
- J. D. Dam Lake, Coconino county, Arizona.

- Location within Arizona Location within the United States
- Location: Coconino County, Arizona, United States
- Coordinates: 35°4′5″N 112°1′44″W
- Basin countries: United States
- Surface area: 6 acres (2.4 ha)
- Average depth: 6 ft (1.8 m)
- Surface elevation: 6,460 ft (1,970 m)

J. D. Dam Lake is located 19.5 miles (31.4 km) south and east of Williams in North Central Arizona.

== Fish species ==
- Rainbow Trout
