= Becker Lake =

Waterbody in Apache County, Arizona

- Location within Arizona
- Location: Apache County, Arizona
- Coordinates: 34°9′8.67″N 109°18′24.32″W
- Basin countries: United States
- Surface area: 85 acres (34 ha)
- Average depth: 10 ft (3.0 m)
- Surface elevation: 6,910 ft (2,110 m)

Becker Lake is a reservoir managed as a trophy trout lake. Located near Springerville, Arizona, Becker Lake is part of the 622-acre (252 ha) Becker Lake Wildlife Area. Built around the year 1880, it is one of the oldest reservoirs in the White Mountains. The Arizona Game and Fish Department acquired the lake and property around it in 1973. The lake is located at 6,910 feet (2,110 m).

The lake was originally impounded by Gustav and Julius Becker, and named for them.

== Description ==
Becker Lake has 107 acres (43 ha) with a maximum depth of 21 feet (6.4 m) and an average depth of 10 feet (3.0 m). It is located on a diversion of the Little Colorado River. The Department owns water rights in the lake, so water levels can be maintained. The lake is stocked with sub-catchable rainbow trout twice a year and many of these fish survive the winter, reaching a good size the following spring. The lake also contains native Little Colorado suckers and illegally introduced green sunfish.

The lake has a boat ramp, dirt parking and barrier-free restroom. The Department has developed two hiking trails through the Wildlife Area.

== Fish species ==
- Rainbow trout
- Brown trout
