= Kinnikinick Lake =

Reservoir in Coconino County, Arizona

- Location within Arizona Location within the United States
- Location: Coconino County, Arizona, United States
- Coordinates: 34°53′51″N 111°18′20″W
- Basin countries: United States
- Surface area: 126 acres (51 ha)
- Average depth: 22 ft (6.7 m)
- Surface elevation: 7,040 ft (2,150 m)

Kinnikinick Lake is located 38 mi (61 km) south of Flagstaff in North Central Arizona within the Coconino National Forest. Prairies of juniper surround the lake and typically abound with pronghorn. Bald eagles are often seen during the fall and winter months. The facilities are maintained under the authority of the Coconino National Forest.

== Fish species ==
- Rainbow Trout
- Catfish (Channel)
- Bullhead
- Brook Trout
- Brown Trout
