= Show Low Lake =

Waterbody in Navajo County, Arizona

- Location within Arizona Location within the United States
- Location: Navajo County, Arizona
- Coordinates: 34°11′6.15″N 110°00′3.47″W
- Basin countries: United States
- Surface area: 100 acres (40 ha)
- Average depth: 27 ft (8.2 m)
- Surface elevation: 6,500 ft (2,000 m)

Show Low Lake is a 100-acre (0.40 km^{2}) lake nestled at 6,500 feet (2,000 m) elevation in the White Mountains of Arizona which is administered by the Arizona Game and Fish Department along with the city of Show Low. Show Low Lake Park is located five miles (8 km) south of downtown Show Low.

== Description ==
Show Low Lake has 100 acres (0.40 km^{2}) with an average depth of 33 feet (10 m) and maximum depth of 50 feet (15 m). It's situated at an elevation of 6,500 feet (2,000 m). The lake maintains good water quality year round, and is stocked with rainbow trout from April through September. The Arizona Game and Fish Department occasionally stocks channel catfish. The lake also contains reproducing populations of walleye, largemouth and smallmouth bass, bluegill and green sunfish.

== Fish species ==
- Rainbow
- Largemouth Bass
- Smallmouth Bass
- Sunfish
- Catfish (Channel)
- walleye
