= Hulsey Lake =

Lake in Apache County, Arizona

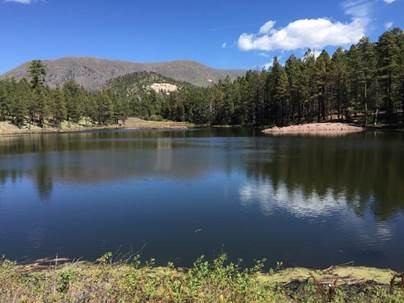

- Location within Arizona
- Location: Apache County, Arizona
- Coordinates: 33°55′56.10″N 109°9′39.97″W
- Basin countries: United States
- Surface area: 4 acres (1.6 ha)
- Average depth: 10 ft (3.0 m)
- Surface elevation: 8,620 ft (2,630 m)

Hulsey Lake is a lake near Escudilla Mountain in the Apache National Forest, Arizona. It is located at 8,620 feet (2,630 m) on the Apache-Sitgreaves National Forests. It is an impoundment of Hulsey Creek, a tributary of Nutrioso Creek. Due to snow and ice, the lake is usually inaccessible from November to mid-April.

== Description ==
Hulsey Lake is 4 acres (1.6 ha) in size, with a maximum depth of 12 feet (3.7 m) and an average depth of 10 feet (3.0 m). The area around the lake is heavily forested, and the tree line comes down to the shoreline. The Arizona Game and Fish Department stocks Hulsey Lake with rainbow trout in the spring and early summer. The lake gets weedy in summer months, and high pH levels prevent stocking as the season progresses. The lake frequently has a winter kill; there is typically no overwinter survival.

== Fish species ==
- Rainbow Trout
