= White Horse Lake (Arizona) =

Lake in Coconino County, Arizona

Whitehorse Lake
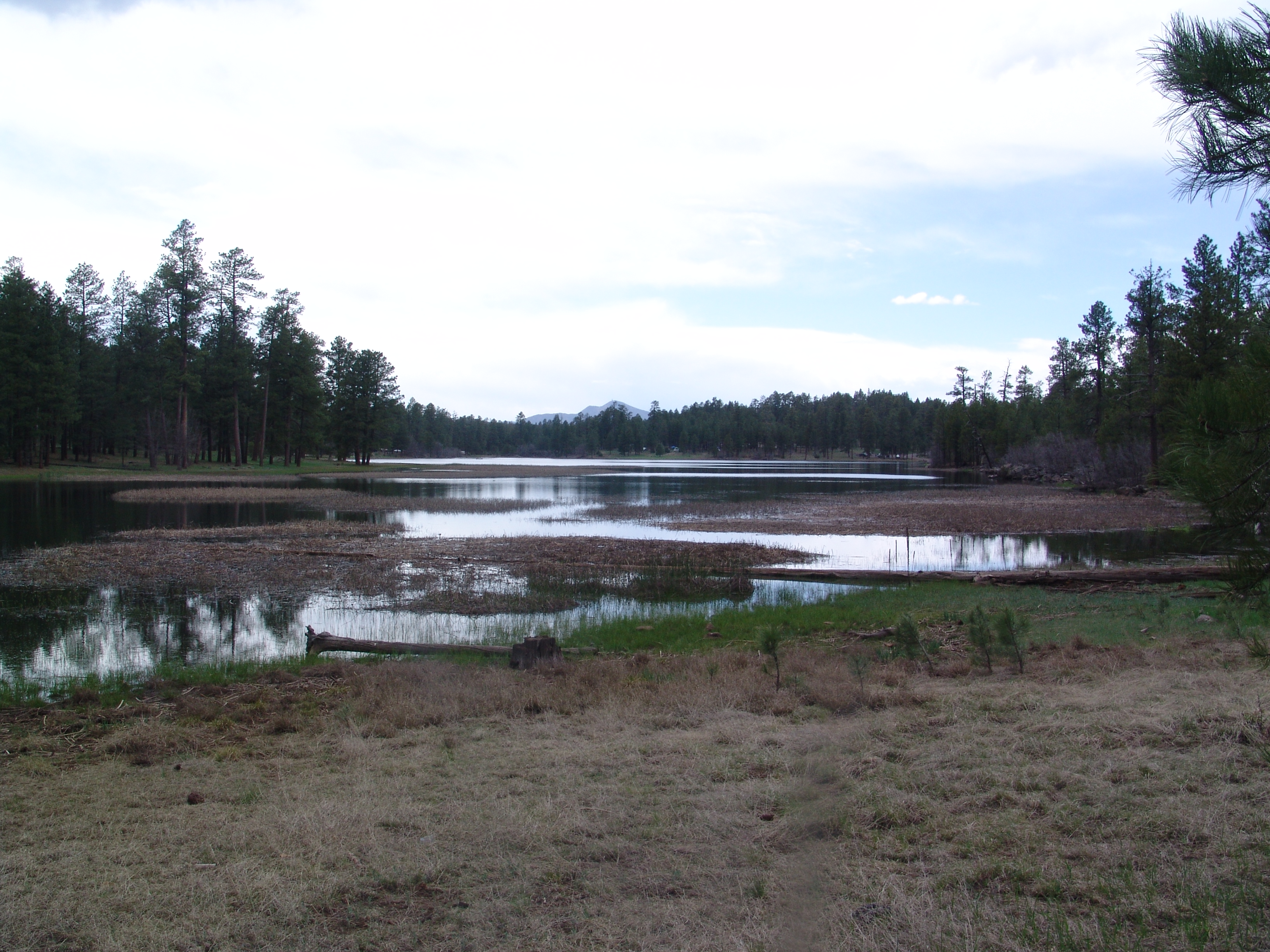
- White Horse Lake, Coconino county, Arizona.

- Location within Arizona Location within the United States
- Location: Coconino County, Arizona, United States
- Coordinates: 35°07′00″N 112°00′48″W
- Basin countries: United States
- Surface area: 35 acres (14 ha)
- Average depth: 15 ft (4.6 m)
- Surface elevation: 6,560 ft (2,000 m)
- References: U.S. Geological Survey Geographic Names Information System: GNIS data

White Horse Lake is located 19 miles (31 km) southeast of Williams in North Central Arizona.

== History ==
White Horse Lake is man-made. The dam was constructed in 1934–35 for the resident of Williams for recreational purposes.

== Fish species ==
- Rainbow Trout
- Largemouth Bass
- Sunfish
- Catfish (Channel)
- Brown Trout
- Black Crappie
