= Fain Lake =

Waterbody in Yavapai County, Arizona

- Location within Arizona
- Location: Yavapai County, Arizona, United States
- Coordinates: 34°34′30.05″N 112°21′7.78″W
- Type: Reservoir
- Primary inflows: Lynx Creek
- Primary outflows: Lynx Creek
- Basin countries: United States
- Surface area: 3 acres (1.2 ha)
- Average depth: 8 ft (2.4 m)
- Surface elevation: 5,075 ft (1,547 m)

Fain Lake is a reservoir located near Prescott Valley in Yavapai County, North Central Arizona.

== Fish species ==
- Rainbow Trout
- Brook Trout
- Brown Trout
- Largemouth Bass
- Channel Catfish
- Bluegill
- Green Sunfish
- Yellow Bullhead
