= Cluff Ranch Ponds =

Wildlife area in Graham County, Arizona

- Location within Arizona
- Location: Graham County, Arizona, United States
- Coordinates: 32°49′57″N 109°50′5″W
- Type: reservoir
- Basin countries: United States
- Surface area: 15 acres (6.1 ha)
- Average depth: 20 ft (6.1 m)
- Surface elevation: 3,000 ft (910 m)

The Cluff Ranch Ponds are located in the Cluff Ranch Wildlife Area at the base of the Pinaleño Mountains in southeastern Arizona. The town of Pima is 5 miles (8.0 km) away, and the city of Safford is 7 miles (11 km) away. The facilities are maintained by the Arizona Game and Fish Department.

== Fish species ==
- Rainbow Trout
- Largemouth Bass
- Crappie
- Sunfish
- Black Bullhead
- Catfish (Channel)
- Bullfrogs
- White amur
- Carp
