= Pecks Lake =

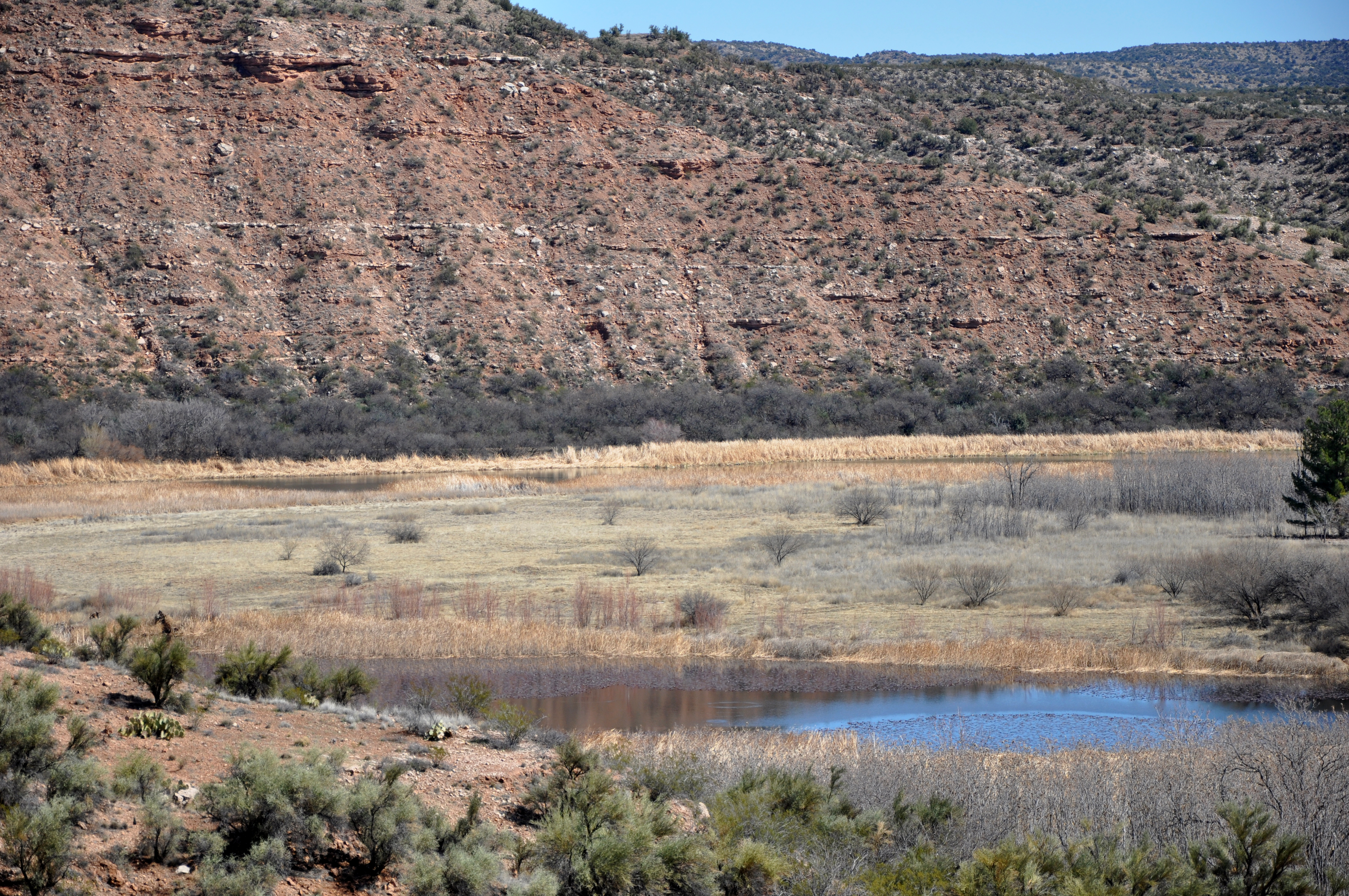
- From near Sycamore Canyon Road

- Location within Arizona Location within the United States
- Location: Yavapai County, Arizona
- Coordinates: 34°46′54″N 112°02′15″W
- Type: Reservoir, eutrophic
- Primary inflows: Verde River
- Primary outflows: Tavasci Marsh
- Basin countries: United States
- Max. depth: 10 feet (3.0 m)
- Surface elevation: 3,333 feet (1,016 m)
- Settlements: Clarkdale

Pecks Lake is a small reservoir, fed by water from the adjacent Verde River, near Clarkdale in the U.S. state of Arizona. The name of the nearby Tuzigoot National Monument comes from an Apache word, Tuzigoot, meaning crooked water. The "crooked water" reference is to Pecks Lake, established in a cutoff meander of the river.

The shallow lake gets most of its water from the river through a tunnel on the northwest corner of the property, downstream from a large slag heap from the former copper smelter at Clarkdale. Overflow from the lake passes over a weir at the east end of the lake into Tavasci Marsh. The surrounding area includes the capped and re-vegetated tailings pond of the smelter, which processed ore from the United Verde copper mine at Jerome.

== History ==
Pecks Lake was built to provide process water for the smelter and recreation for the smelter community. Amenities included a nine-hole golf course, a dance hall, and a club house near the lake. Until 2003, the Town of Clarkdale leased the lake and surrounding property from the Phelps Dodge Corporation and made it available to the public for fishing and other forms of recreation. However, after the lease expired, Phelps Dodge (later acquired by Freeport-McMoRan) closed the property to the public.

The lake is becoming eutrophic, choked with aquatic plants, including invasive water lilies and Eurasian milfoil. Peck's Lake supports populations of northern pike, yellow perch, smallmouth bass, and sunfish but no native fish species.

== Land-use debate ==
In April 2010, Sustainable Clarkdale, an advocacy group, recommended that the Town of Clarkdale buy Pecks Lake and its surrounds from Freeport-McMoRan. The 977-acre (395 ha) parcel, also known as Verde Valley Ranch, could then become home, the group said, to a variety of projects related to energy production (particularly solar, biomass, and plasma gasification), recreation, water purification, and commercial development—all with as little negative environmental impact as possible. The project would be known as the Clarkdale Sustainability Park.

In November 2010, Freeport-McMoRan declined a Sustainability Park proposal by the Town of Clarkdale, suggesting that land uses on the parcel should be limited to recreation and habitat preservation consistent with those at Tuzigoot National Monument and Tavasci Marsh. Town officials said they would consider siting the Park elsewhere and that they hoped that Freeport-McMoRan would eventually agree to public ownership of Verde Valley Ranch and remediation of Pecks Lake.

== See also ==
- List of lakes in Arizona
