= Lake Bekihatso =

Lake in Apache County, Arizona, US

- Location within Arizona Location within the United States
- Location: Apache County, Arizona
- Coordinates: 36.0025°N 109.6430°W
- Lake type: natural freshwater lake
- Basin countries: United States
- Max. length: 310 feet (94 m)
- Max. width: 55 feet (17 m)
- Surface elevation: 6,764 feet (2,062 m)

Lake Bekihatso is a crescent-shaped lake slightly more than 2 miles (3.2 km) west of US 191 in Apache County, Arizona. This lake is in very uneven and isolated desertlike terrain. Bekihatso is a name derived from the Navajo language meaning "big pond".

== See also ==
- List of lakes in Arizona
