= Soldiers Annex Lake =

Waterbody in Coconino County, Arizona

- Location within Arizona
- Location: Coconino County, Arizona, United States
- Coordinates: 34°46′55.6″N 111°13′33.8″W
- Type: reservoir
- Basin countries: United States
- Surface area: 60 acres (24 ha)
- Average depth: 5 ft (1.5 m)
- Max. depth: 30 ft (9.1 m)
- Surface elevation: 6,777 ft (2,066 m)

Soldiers Annex Lake is located 75 miles (121 km) southeast of Flagstaff in the state of Arizona. Long Lake is the main lake of the area. The facilities are maintained by Coconino National Forest division of the USDA Forest Service.

== Fish species ==
- Largemouth Bass
- Bluegill
- Channel Catfish
- Northern Pike
- Walleye
- Golden Shiner
- Crayfish
