= Deadhorse Lake =

Lake in Yavapai County, Arizona, US

- Location within Arizona Location within the United States
- Location: Yavapai County, Arizona, United States
- Coordinates: 34°45′3.83″N 112°0′55.29″W
- Type: Lake
- Basin countries: United States
- Surface area: 4 acres (1.6 ha)
- Average depth: 16 ft (4.9 m)
- Surface elevation: 3,400 ft (1,000 m)

Deadhorse Lake is located near Clarkdale in North Central Arizona.

== Fish species ==
- Rainbow trout
- Largemouth Bass
- Sunfish
- Catfish (Channel)
