= Goldwater Lake =

Reservoir in Yavapai County, Arizona

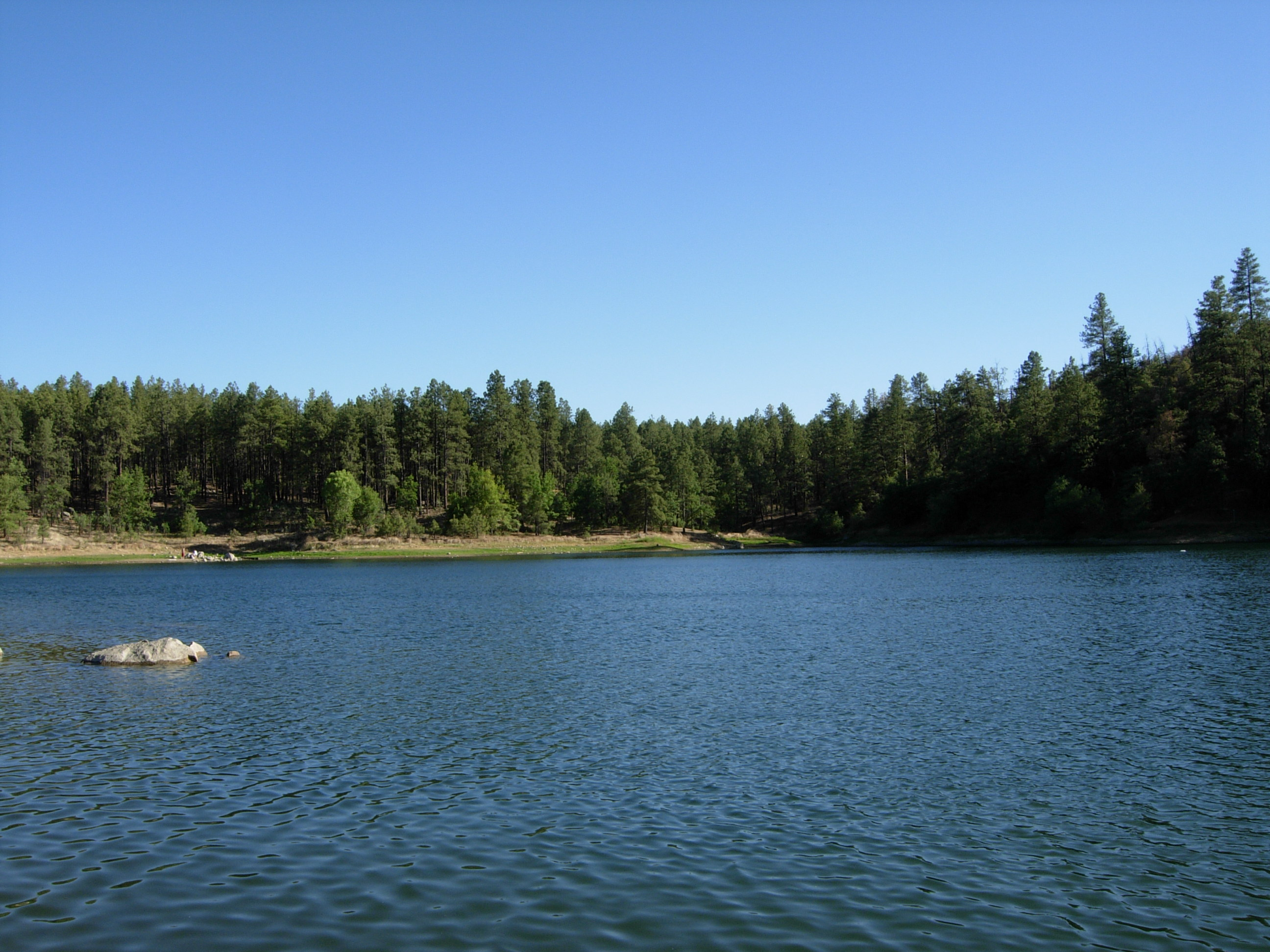

- Location within Arizona
- Location: Yavapai County, Arizona, United States
- Coordinates: 34°29′53.4″N 112°27′00.0″W
- Type: reservoir
- Primary inflows: Banning Creek
- Primary outflows: Banning Creek
- Basin countries: United States
- Surface area: 25 acres (10 ha)
- Average depth: 10 ft (3.0 m)
- Surface elevation: 5,990 ft (1,830 m)

Goldwater Lake is a reservoir formed by a dam on Banning Creek, located south of Prescott in North Central Arizona. This lake is maintained by the City of Prescott Parks and Recreation Department. The park has facilities for picnicking, fishing, boating, hiking, volleyball, and horseshoes.

The lake is named for longtime Prescott mayor Morris Goldwater, uncle of U.S. senator and 1964 Republican presidential candidate Barry Goldwater.

== Fish species ==
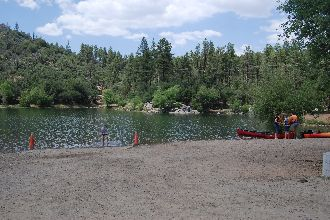
Day Use at Goldwater Lake

- Largemouth Bass
- Crappie
- Sunfish
- Catfish (Channel)
- Rainbow Trout
- Brook Trout
- Gila Trout
- Crawfish
