= Russel Tank =

Waterbody in Coconino County, Arizona

- Location within Arizona
- Location: Coconino County, Arizona, United States
- Coordinates: 35°52′21.50″N 111°52′45.00″W
- Type: reservoir
- Basin countries: United States
- Surface area: 1 acre (0.40 ha)
- Average depth: 15 ft (4.6 m)
- Surface elevation: 7,000 ft (2,100 m)

Russel Tank is located between Williams and Tusayan in North Central Arizona.

== Fish species ==
- Rainbow Trout
- Yellow Perch
