= Tuzigoot National Monument =

Historic site in Yavapai County, Arizona, US

- IUCN category III (natural monument or feature)
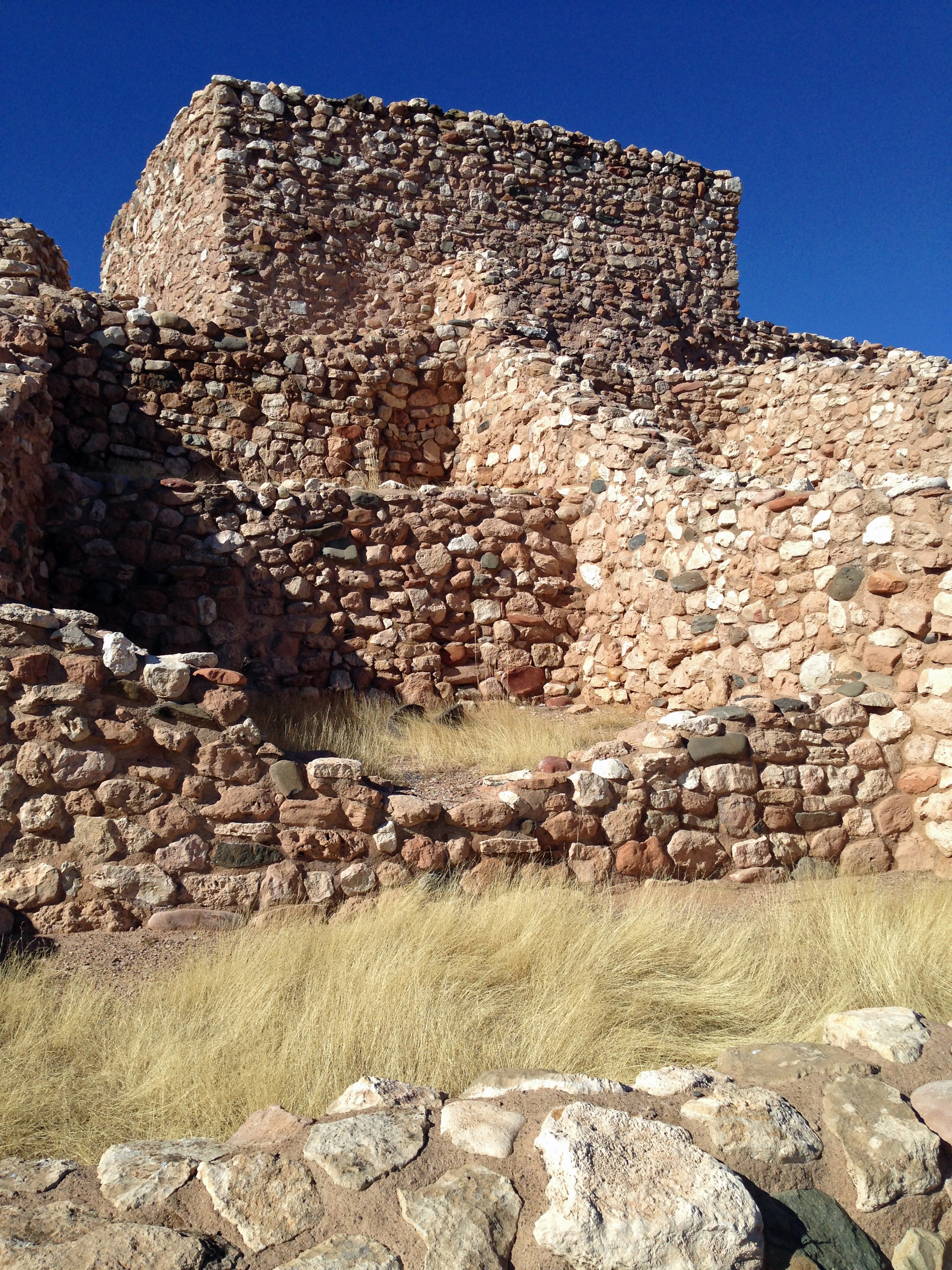
- Part of the Tuzigoot pueblo

- Location within Arizona Location within the United States
- Interactive map of Tuzigoot National Monument
- Location: Yavapai County, Arizona, US
- Nearest city: Cottonwood, Arizona
- Coordinates: 34.7708537°N 112.0259912°W
- Area: 811.89 acres (328.56 ha)
- Created: July 25, 1939
- Visitors: 86,473 (in 2025)
- Governing body: National Park Service
- Website: Tuzigoot National Monument

Tuzigoot National Monument (Yavapai: ʼHaktlakva, Western Apache: Tú Digiz) preserves a 2- to 3-story pueblo ruin on the summit of a limestone and sandstone ridge just east of Clarkdale, Arizona, 120 feet (37 m) above the Verde River floodplain. The Tuzigoot Site is an elongated complex of stone masonry rooms that were built along the spine of a natural outcrop in the Verde Valley. The central rooms stand higher than the others and they appear to have served public functions. The pueblo has 110 rooms. The National Park Service currently administers 58 acres (23 hectares), within an authorized boundary of 834 acres (338 hectares).

″Tú Digiz/Tuzigoot″ is a Tonto Apache term for "crooked waters," from nearby Pecks Lake, a cutoff meander of the Verde River; from Tú Digiz one principal Tonto Apache clan gets its name. The pueblo was built by the Sinagua people between 1125 and 1400 CE. Tuzigoot is the largest and best preserved of the many Sinagua pueblo ruins in the Verde Valley. The ruins at Tuzigoot incorporate very few doors; instead, the inhabitants used ladders accessed by trapdoor type openings in the roofs to enter each room.

The monument is on land once owned by United Verde/Phelps Dodge. The corporation sold the site to Yavapai County for $1 so that the excavation could be completed under the auspices of federal relief projects. The county in turn transferred the land to the federal government.

Tuzigoot was excavated from 1933 to 1935 by Louis Caywood and Edward Spicer of the University of Arizona, with funding from the federal Civil Works Administration and Works Project Administration. In 1935–1936, with additional federal funding, the ruins were prepared for public display, and a Pueblo Revival-style museum and visitor center was constructed.

Franklin D. Roosevelt designated Tuzigoot Ruins as a U.S. National Monument on July 25, 1939. The Tuzigoot National Monument Archeological District was listed on the National Register of Historic Places on October 15, 1966.

The ruins are surrounded by the tailings pond of the former United Verde copper mine at Jerome. The tailings have recently been stabilized and revegetated.

== Climate ==
Tuzigoot National Monument has a semi-arid climate (Köppen: BSk) with cool winters and very hot summers.

Climate data for Tuzigoot National Monument, Arizona, 1991–2020 normals, extremes 1920–present
Month	Jan	Feb	Mar	Apr	May	Jun	Jul	Aug	Sep	Oct	Nov	Dec	Year
Record high °F (°C)	80 (27)	87 (31)	92 (33)	98 (37)	107 (42)	118 (48)	116 (47)	114 (46)	113 (45)	104 (40)	91 (33)	79 (26)	118 (48)
Mean maximum °F (°C)	71.5 (21.9)	74.9 (23.8)	82.5 (28.1)	91.3 (32.9)	99.5 (37.5)	108.1 (42.3)	109.9 (43.3)	106.7 (41.5)	100.8 (38.2)	92.5 (33.6)	81.8 (27.7)	71.3 (21.8)	111.3 (44.1)
Mean daily maximum °F (°C)	60.9 (16.1)	64.5 (18.1)	71.2 (21.8)	78.9 (26.1)	87.9 (31.1)	98.9 (37.2)	101.1 (38.4)	98.4 (36.9)	93.1 (33.9)	82.6 (28.1)	70.5 (21.4)	59.8 (15.4)	80.6 (27.0)
Daily mean °F (°C)	45.3 (7.4)	48.6 (9.2)	54.4 (12.4)	61.0 (16.1)	69.4 (20.8)	79.1 (26.2)	83.9 (28.8)	82.0 (27.8)	75.7 (24.3)	64.7 (18.2)	53.3 (11.8)	44.6 (7.0)	63.5 (17.5)
Mean daily minimum °F (°C)	29.8 (−1.2)	32.7 (0.4)	37.6 (3.1)	43.0 (6.1)	50.8 (10.4)	59.3 (15.2)	66.8 (19.3)	65.5 (18.6)	58.4 (14.7)	46.7 (8.2)	36.0 (2.2)	29.4 (−1.4)	46.3 (7.9)
Mean minimum °F (°C)	20.9 (−6.2)	23.2 (−4.9)	28.4 (−2.0)	33.6 (0.9)	40.1 (4.5)	49.6 (9.8)	59.3 (15.2)	59.1 (15.1)	49.0 (9.4)	36.0 (2.2)	25.2 (−3.8)	20.1 (−6.6)	17.8 (−7.9)
Record low °F (°C)	5 (−15)	6 (−14)	14 (−10)	24 (−4)	29 (−2)	40 (4)	52 (11)	46 (8)	41 (5)	21 (−6)	8 (−13)	8 (−13)	5 (−15)
Average precipitation inches (mm)	1.10 (28)	0.99 (25)	1.01 (26)	0.43 (11)	0.42 (11)	0.18 (4.6)	1.64 (42)	2.15 (55)	1.30 (33)	0.96 (24)	0.70 (18)	1.12 (28)	12.00 (305)
Average snowfall inches (cm)	0.2 (0.51)	0.1 (0.25)	0.1 (0.25)	0.2 (0.51)	0.0 (0.0)	0.0 (0.0)	0.0 (0.0)	0.0 (0.0)	0.0 (0.0)	0.0 (0.0)	0.1 (0.25)	0.3 (0.76)	1.0 (2.5)
Average precipitation days (≥ 0.01 inch)	4.6	5.2	4.7	2.7	2.5	1.3	7.5	8.4	4.9	3.6	3.1	4.4	52.9
Average snowy days (≥ 0.1 inch)	0.2	0.2	0.1	0.1	0.0	0.0	0.0	0.0	0.0	0.0	0.0	0.2	0.8
Source: NOAA

== Gallery ==
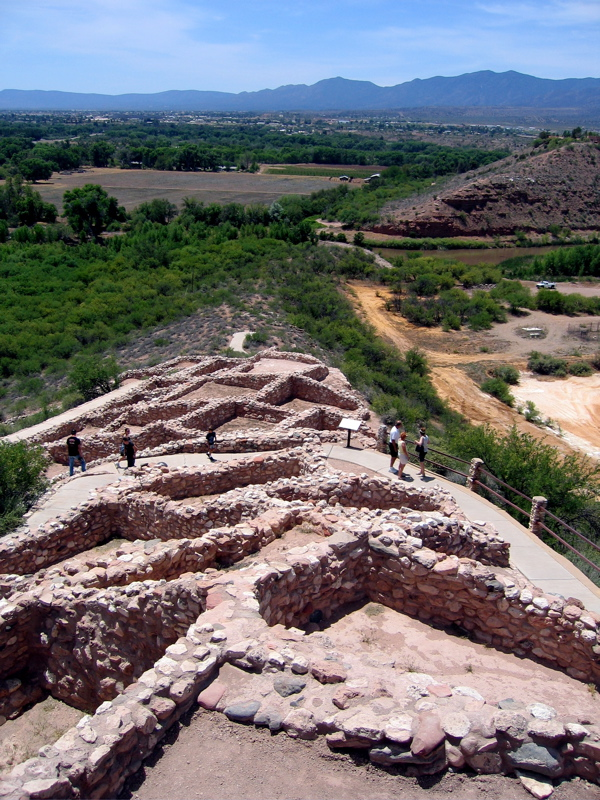
Tuzigoot National Monument

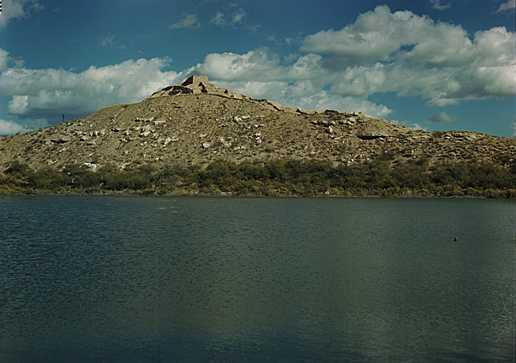
Tuzigoot, viewed from across the old tailings pond, 1945

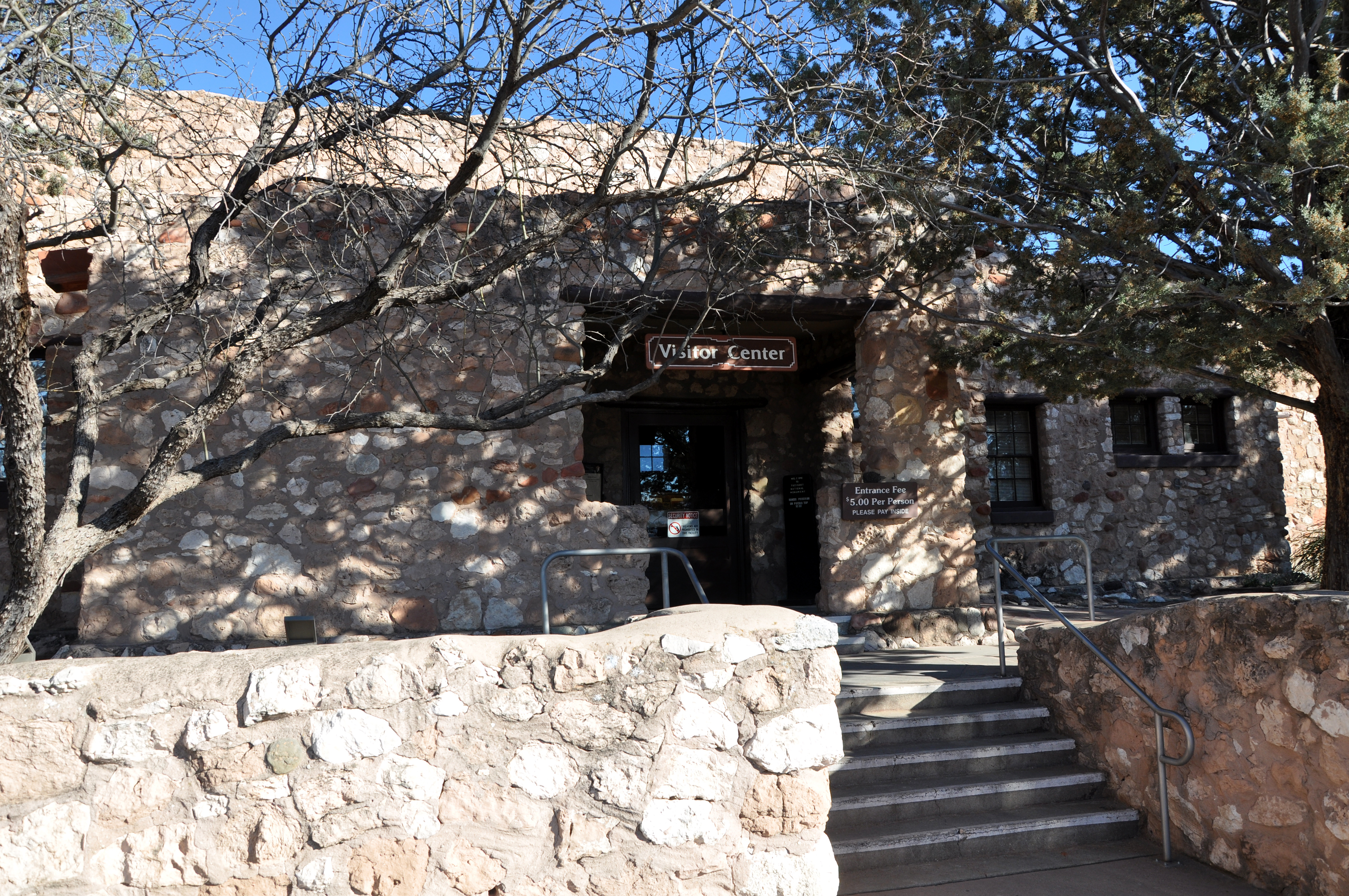
Tuzigoot Museum

== See also ==
- National Register of Historic Places listings in Yavapai County, Arizona
- List of historic properties in Clarkdale, Arizona
- List of national monuments of the United States
