= Sahuarita Lake =

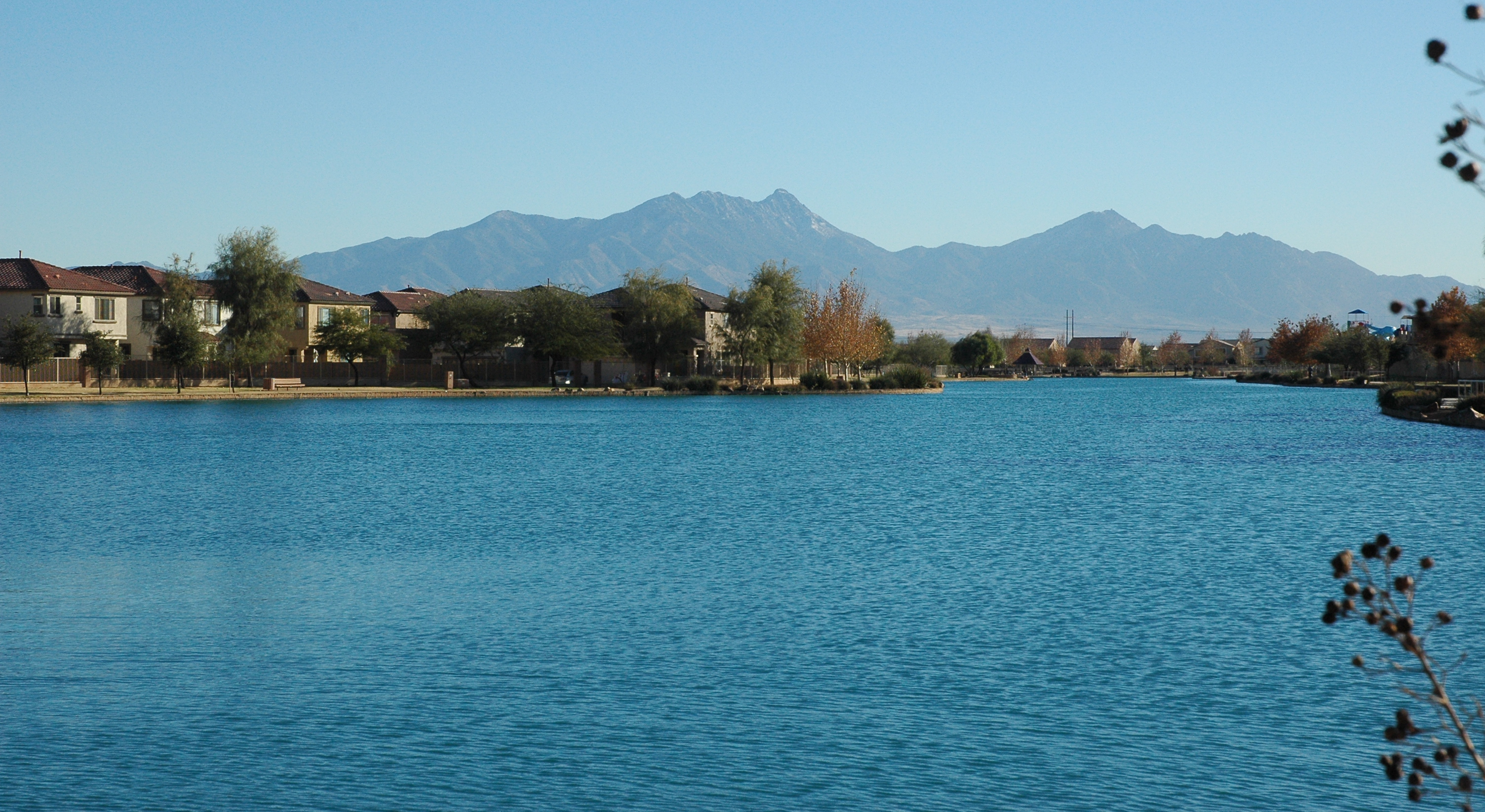
- December, 2007

- Location within Arizona
- Location: 15466 S Rancho Sahuarita Blvd, Sahuarita Lake Park, Pima County, Arizona, United States
- Coordinates: 31°58′30″N 110°58′4″W
- Type: reservoir
- Basin countries: United States
- Surface area: 10 acres (4.0 ha)
- Average depth: 7 ft (2.1 m)
- Max. depth: 12 ft (3.7 m)
- Surface elevation: 2,715 ft (828 m)
- Settlements: Sahuarita

Sahuarita Lake is an artificial lake located in Sahuarita, Arizona. The lake was created in 2000 and opened for public use in 2001. The surface area of the lake is approximately 10 acres with a maximum depth of 12 feet (3.66 meters).

== Fish species ==
- Rainbow Trout
- Large mouth Bass
- Sunfish (bluegill)
- Catfish
