= Desert Breeze Lake =

Lake in Maricopa County, Arizona, US

Desert Breeze
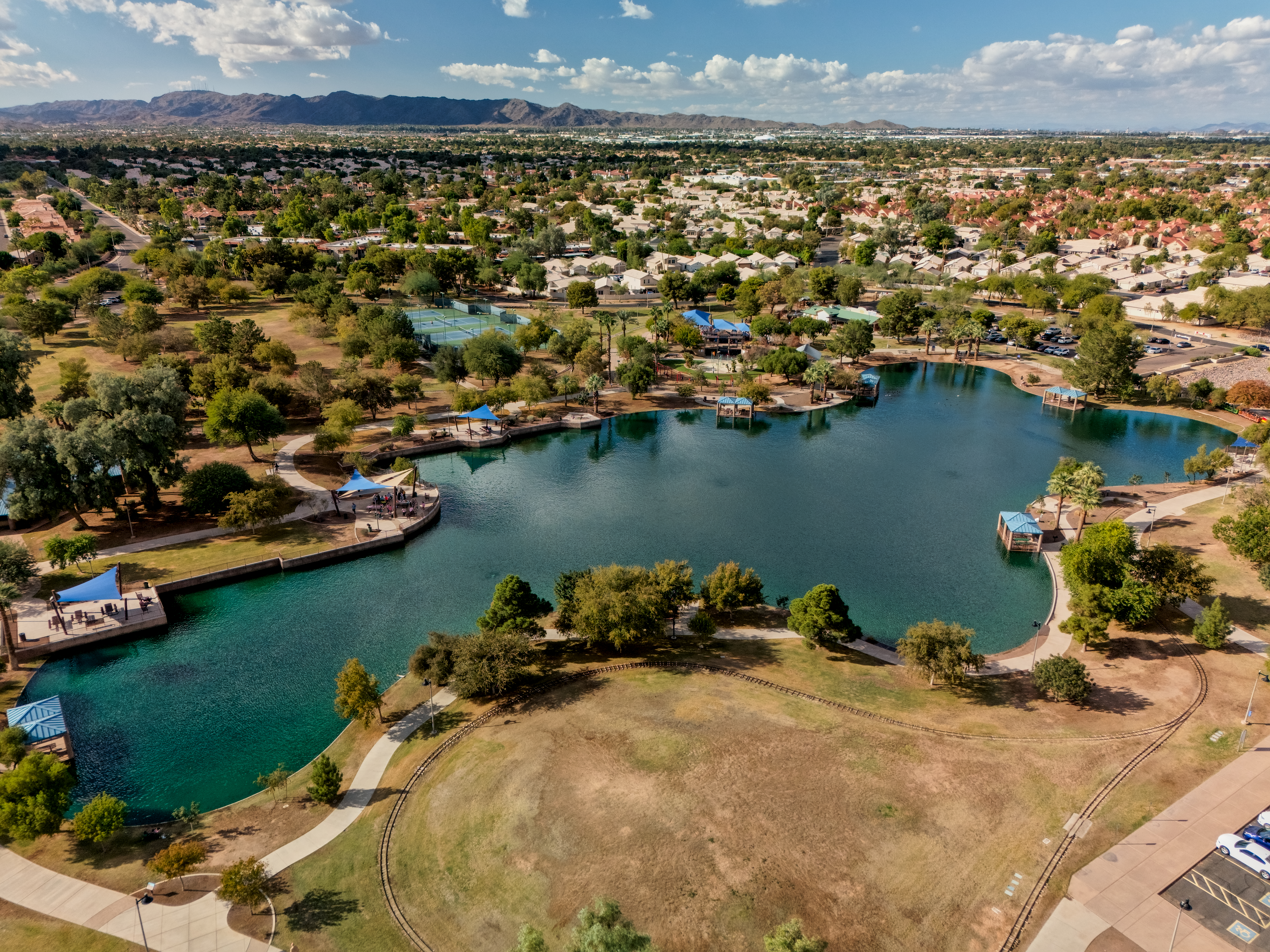
- Southeast aerial view of Desert Breeze Lake

- Location within Arizona
- Location: Chandler, Arizona, US
- Coordinates: 33°18′48.84″N 111°55′10.15″W
- Basin countries: United States
- Surface area: 4 acres (1.6 ha)
- Average depth: 8 ft (2.4 m)
- Surface elevation: 1,100 ft (340 m)
- Settlements: Chandler

Desert Breeze Lake is located in Desert Breeze Park in west Chandler, Arizona, US, southwest of Ray Road and McClintock Drive on Desert Breeze Boulevard.

== Fish species ==
- Rainbow trout
- Largemouth bass
- Sunfish
- Catfish (channel)
- Tilapia
- Carp
