= Riverview Lake =

Waterbody in Maricopa County, Arizona

- Location within Arizona
- Location: Mesa, Arizona
- Coordinates: 33°25′50″N 111°52′31″W
- Basin countries: United States
- Surface area: 3 acres (1.2 ha)
- Average depth: 10 ft (3.0 m)
- Surface elevation: 1,100 ft (340 m)
- Settlements: Mesa

Riverview Lake is a lake in Riverview Park at Mesa, Arizona, United States. The lake is located west of Dobson Road and north of 8th Street.

Golden algae has caused recent fish die offs during the summer of 2018. Due to the severity of algae, a vast majority of fish were killed. Testing in late summer of 2018 showed the issues contained. AZGFD was able to stock the lake with sunfish and catfish.

== Fish species ==
- Rainbow Trout
- Largemouth Bass
- Sunfish
- Catfish (Channel)
- Carp
