= Evelyn Hallman Pond =

Lake in Maricopa County, Arizona

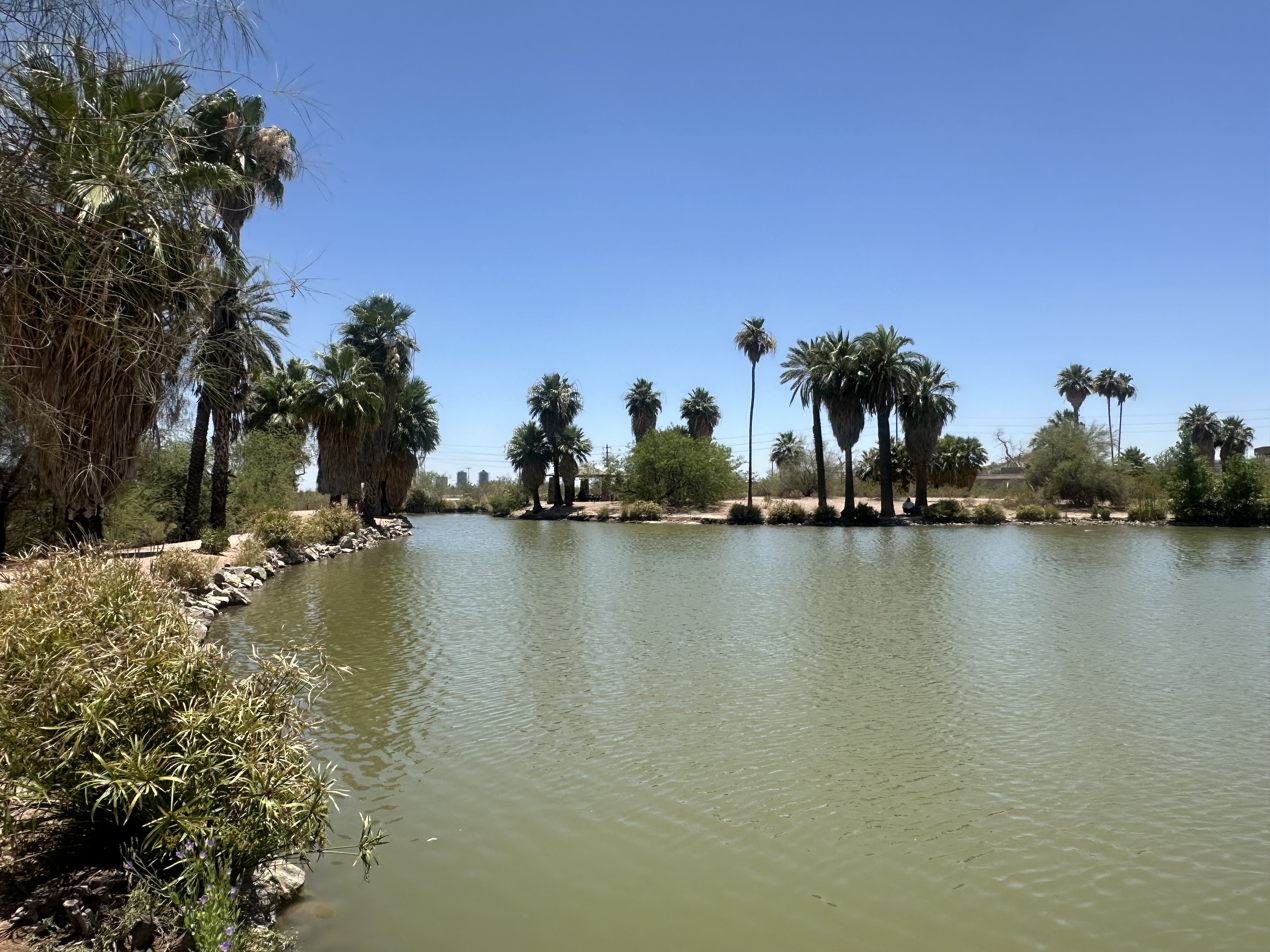
- Evelyn Hallman Pond in Tempe, Arizona

- Location within Arizona
- Location: Tempe, Arizona
- Coordinates: 33°26′58″N 111°56′17″W
- Basin countries: United States
- Surface area: 3 acres (1.2 ha)
- Average depth: 5 ft (1.5 m)
- Surface elevation: 1,100 ft (340 m)
- Islands: 2
- Settlements: Tempe

Evelyn Hallman Pond, at Evelyn Hallman Park (formerly Canal Park) is a small man-made lake located west of Scottsdale Road and south of McKellips Road in the northern part of Tempe, Arizona. Lying on the east side of the Cross Cut Canal (from where it gets its water) it must be reached from the east.

Park and lake were renamed in 2006 for Evelyn Hallman, mother of mayor Hugh Hallman.

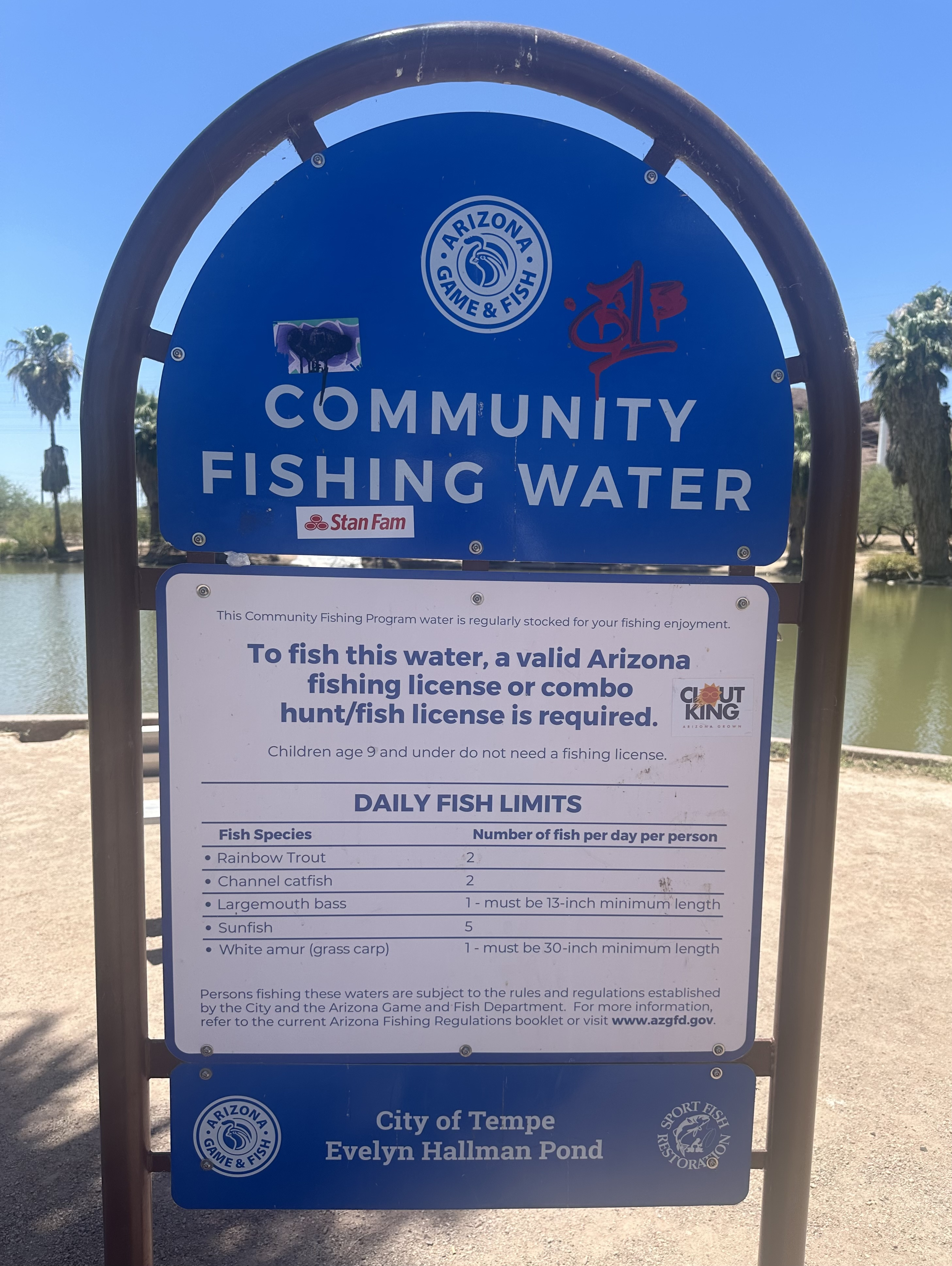
Evelyn Hallman Pond community fishing water, city of Tempe

== Fish species ==
- Rainbow Trout
- Largemouth Bass
- Sunfish
- Catfish (Channel)
- Tilapia
- Carp
