= Rainbow Lake (Arizona) =

Waterbody in Navajo County, Arizona

- Location within Arizona Location within the United States
- Location: Navajo County, Arizona
- Coordinates: 34°8′59.59″N 109°59′3.50″W
- Basin countries: United States
- Surface area: 80 acres (32 ha)
- Average depth: 6 ft (1.8 m)
- Surface elevation: 6,700 ft (2,000 m)

Rainbow Lake is a 116-acre manmade lake near the town of Pinetop-Lakeside and the community of Lake of the Woods in southern Navajo County, Arizona, United States. The lake was created in 1903 when Mormon settlers dammed Walnut Creek, a tributary of the Little Colorado River, to impound water for irrigation.

== History ==
Settlers established communities in nearby Lakeside and Pinetop in the early 1880s. These settlements eventually grew into a single larger community called Lakeside, incorporated in 1986 as the Town of Pinetop-Lakeside. Rainbow Lake was originally built as a reservoir for the Pinetop-Woodland Lake Irrigation Company, who own all the water in the lake used for irrigation purposes. Water levels in the lake vary widely, depending on the season, precipitation, and the needs of the irrigation company.

In 1998, the Show Low Irrigation Company and the Pinetop-Woodland Irrigation Company merged; however, the land under the lake (to the "high water mark") is still owned by the Irrigation company as well as all the water. The land surrounding the lake is privately owned and not generally accessible to the public; however, the Arizona Game and Fish Department owns a small parcel of land on the northwest side of the lake at an elevation of 6,760 feet (2,060 m), where it maintains a Public Landing for fishing and recreational boating. Rainbow Lake now lies just outside the boundaries of the Town of Pinetop-Lakeside, adjacent to Arizona State Route 260.

== Description ==
Rainbow Lake is 116 acres (0.47 km^{2}), with a maximum depth of 14 feet (4.3 m) and an average depth of 7 feet (2.1 m). It is a part of the Walnut Creek drainage, which fills three lakes in the area, including Woodland Park Lake (owned by the Town of Pinetop-Lakeside), Rainbow Lake, and the privately owned Lake of the Woods. Rainbow Lake is mostly surrounded by homes, including the private HOA Shores at Rainbow Lake on the southeast side. It is a prominent recreational feature of the Pinetop-Lakeside area, known for its fishing, boating, and wildlife habitats.

Currently, Arizona Game and Fish stocks the lake with catchable-sized rainbow trout in the spring and early summer. Naturally propagating warm water species include largemouth bass, channel catfish, black bullhead, bluegill and green sunfish. The lake also contains illegally introduced northern pike. Because it is shallow and weedy, Rainbow Lake is subject to significant water quality problems.

In past years, Rainbow Lake has also had a significant problem with invasive aquatic weeds, particularly the Eurasian watermilfoil, Myriophyllum spicatum. Efforts by the local volunteer group Show Low Creek Watershed Enhancement Partnership (SLCWEP), in conjunction with the Little Colorado River Plateau Resource Conservation and Development Area, Inc., resulted in a systemic herbicide treatment of the lake in the summer and fall of 2011. The results were not as good as hoped, with the equally problematic coontail weed rapidly replacing the watermilfoil in the lake. Long-term efforts by the Rainbow Lake Coalition (a subcommittee of the SLCWEP) are now focused on the introduction of sterile white Amur carp, which have been proven to control excessive growth of watermilfoil for up to 10 years. Arizona Game and Fish requires mediation to ensure that the carp, a non-native fish, are prevented from escaping Rainbow Lake and potentially invading other water bodies. The Rainbow Lake Coalition is now working to design and construct a fish barrier on Walnut Creek below Lake of the Woods, which has used the carp for weed control for many years.

== Fish species ==
- Rainbow trout
- Largemouth bass
- Sunfish
- Channel catfish
- Black bullhead
- Bluegill
- Northern pike
- Yellow belly catfish
