= Horseshoe Cienega Lake =

Waterbody in Apache County, Arizona

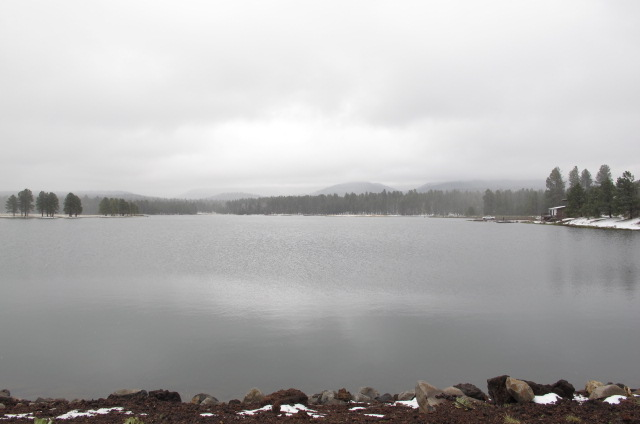

- Location within Arizona Location within the United States
- Location: Apache County, Arizona
- Coordinates: 34°01′56.7″N 109°41′7.8″W
- Basin countries: United States
- Surface area: 120 acres (49 ha)
- Average depth: 30 ft (9.1 m)
- Surface elevation: 8,100 ft (2,500 m)

Horseshoe Cienega Lake is a lake in the White Mountains of eastern Arizona. It is one of the area's most popular fishing lakes due to its productivity and convenience to the main highway State Route 260. The lake is in Apache County. As the lake is on the Fort Apache Indian Reservation, permits must be acquired in nearby Hon-Dah for all activities at the lake including fishing, camping and hiking.

== Location ==
Horseshoe Cienega Lake sits at 8,100 feet (2,500 m) on the Fort Apache Indian Reservation. The lake turnoff is approximately 20 miles (32 km) from Pinetop-Lakeside in the west and approximately 25 miles (40 km) from Eagar to the east. The main parking area and boat launch are about a mile (1.6 km) south of State Route 260, and are accessed by a well-maintained dirt road. Unlike many of the high-altitude White Mountain lakes, Horseshoe Cienega Lake is accessible year-round. Ice fishing is possible when the lake freezes over, typically from late-November until mid-April. The average high temperature at the lake in January is 42 °F (6 °C) compared to an average high of 75 °F (24 °C) in July while the average low temperature in January is 7 °F (−14 °C) compared to average low of 44 °F (7 °C) in July.

== Description ==
The lake was created by damming Horseshoe Creek in the early 1960s. It has a 120 acres (49 hectares) surface area, with an average depth of 30 ft (9.1 m). The lake was briefly drained in the winter of 1990–91. The forest surrounding the south shore of the lake contains around 70 primitive campsites with numerous pit toilets, picnic tables and potable water faucets. A convenience store on the west side of the lake that sells permits, groceries, snacks, bait, and rental boats is consistently open for business. The lake also once held the distinction of having produced the state record brown trout of 16 pounds, 7 ounces and nearly 30 inches long; this record was broken in 1999 by a brown trout caught in Reservation Lake.

== Fish species ==
- Rainbow trout
- Brook trout
- Apache trout
- Brown trout
