= Kennedy Lake (Arizona) =

Waterbody in Pima County, Arizona

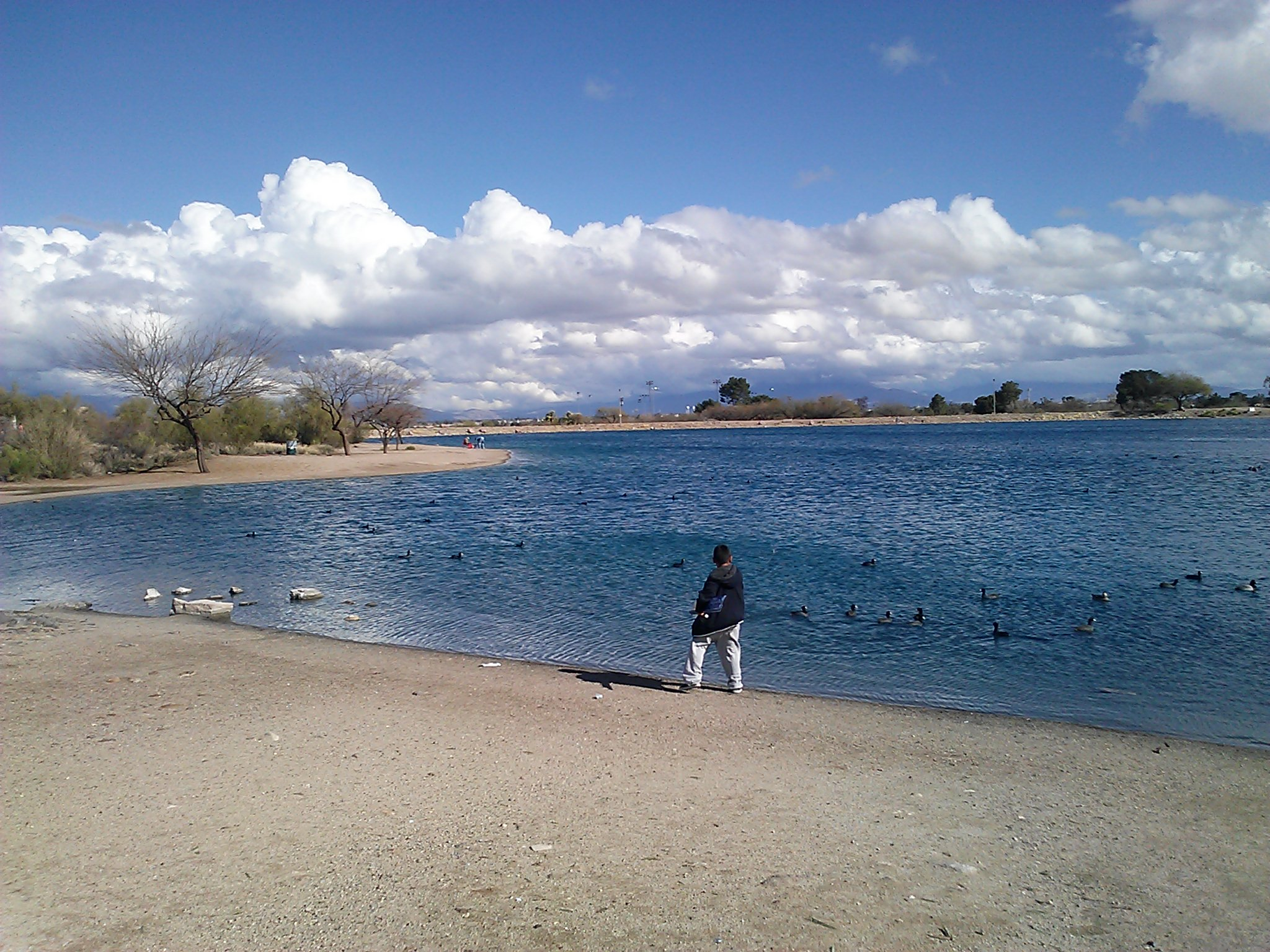
- Lake in 2013

- Location within Arizona Location within the United States
- Location: Tucson, Arizona, United States
- Coordinates: 32°10′52″N 111°0′29″W
- Type: reservoir
- Basin countries: United States
- Surface area: 10 acres (4.0 ha)
- Average depth: 8 ft (2.4 m)
- Max. depth: 12 ft (3.7 m)
- Surface elevation: 2,000 ft (610 m)
- Settlements: Tucson

Kennedy Lake is located in Tucson at J. F. Kennedy Park, north of Ajo Way between La Cholla Boulevard and Mission Road.

== Fish species ==
- Rainbow Trout
- Largemouth Bass
- Sunfish
- Channel Catfish
- Carp
