= Desert West Lake =

Lake in Phoenix, Arizona, US

- Location within Arizona
- Location: 6602 West Encanto Boulevard Phoenix, Arizona 85035
- Coordinates: 33°28′30.19″N 112°11′47.71″W
- Basin countries: United States
- Surface area: 5 acres (2.0 ha)
- Average depth: 11 ft (3.4 m)
- Surface elevation: 1,100 ft (340 m)
- Settlements: Phoenix

Desert West Lake is located in Desert West Park in Phoenix, Arizona, United States, east of 67th Avenue and south of Thomas Road.

== Fish species ==
- Rainbow Trout
- Largemouth Bass
- Sunfish
- Catfish (Channel)
- Carp
