= Cortez Lake =

Lake in Phoenix, Arizona, US

- Location within Arizona Location within the United States
- Location: 3434 West Dunlap Avenue Phoenix, Arizona 85051
- Coordinates: 33°34′12.80″N 112°7′54.75″W
- Basin countries: United States
- Surface area: 3 acres (1.2 ha)
- Average depth: 6 ft (1.8 m)
- Surface elevation: 1,100 ft (340 m)
- Settlements: Phoenix

Cortez Lake is located in Cortez Park in northwest Phoenix, Arizona, United States, at the northeast corner of 35th Avenue and Dunlap Avenue.

== Fish species ==
- Rainbow trout
- Largemouth bass
- Sunfish
- Catfish (channel)
- Carp
