= Fool Hollow Lake =

Waterbody in Navajo County, Arizona

- Location within Arizona
- Location: Show Low, Navajo County, Arizona
- Coordinates: 34.2707663°N 110.0685947°W
- Basin countries: United States
- Surface area: 150 acres (61 ha)
- Average depth: 23 ft (7.0 m)
- Surface elevation: 6,260 ft (1,910 m)

Fool Hollow Lake is a public lake located in Show Low. The lake is operated by the Arizona State Parks Department, and consists of 150 acres (61 ha), with an average depth of 23 feet (7.0 m) together with a variety of fish species.

== Location ==
Fool Hollow Lake is located less than 2 miles (3.2 km) from downtown Show Low, Arizona.

== Description ==
Fool Hollow was named for a hapless settler (Thomas Jefferson Adair) who attempted to farm the rocky canyon in the 1880s. The Arizona Game and Fish Department constructed the lake through the construction of a dam at Fool Hollow Wash and Show Low Creek, thereby covering up the community of Adair, in 1957 specifically to provide water-oriented outdoor recreation. The lake consists of 150 acres (61 ha), with an average depth of 23 feet (7.0 m). It is located within the Fool Hollow Recreation Area, and is cooperatively managed by the Arizona State Parks, the U.S. Forest Service, the Arizona Game and Fish Department and the City of Show Low. The elevation is 6,260 feet (1,910 m). It contains self-sustaining populations of Largemouth and Smallmouth Bass, Sunfish, Walleye, Carp, Black Crappie, Channel Catfish and Crayfish. The Arizona Game and Fish Department stocks the lake with rainbow trout throughout the spring and summer.
