= Ashurst Lake =

Lake in Coconino County, Arizona

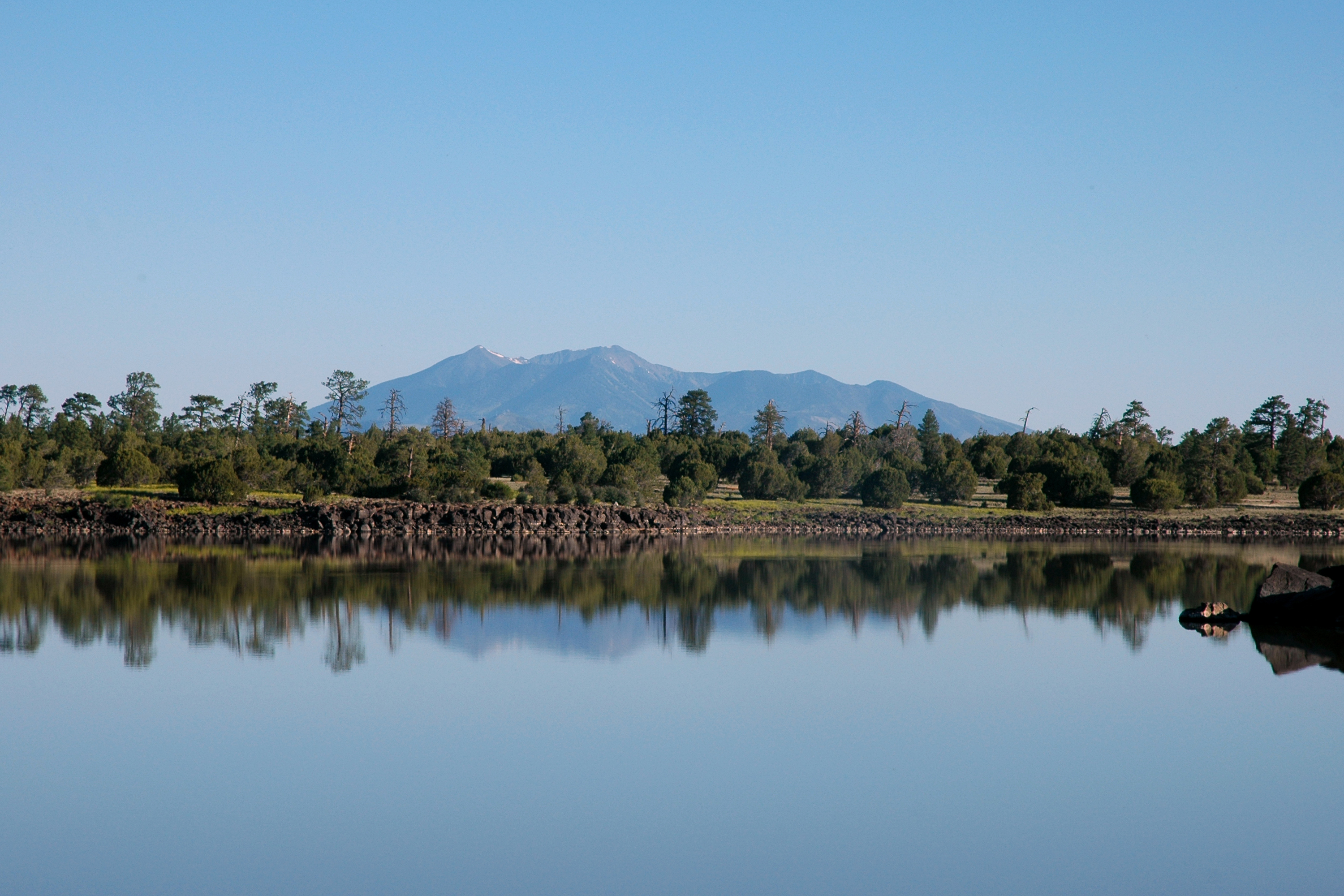

- Location within Arizona Location within the United States
- Location: Coconino County, Arizona, United States
- Coordinates: 35°01′13″N 111°24′11″W
- Type: natural
- Primary inflows: Ashurst Run
- Primary outflows: evaporation
- Basin countries: United States
- Surface area: 229 acres (93 ha)
- Average depth: 12 ft (3.7 m)
- Surface elevation: 7,113 ft (2,168 m)

Ashurst Lake is a small lake located on the Anderson Mesa 20 miles (32 km) southeast of Flagstaff. It is one of the few natural lakes in the state of Arizona, the bulk of which reside in the area.

Unlike similarly sized lakes in the North Central Arizona region, Ashurst is fed by more reliable springs and has a reputation for retaining water even during long dry periods. The lake is regularly stocked with rainbow trout and thus a common destination for local anglers. Ashurst Lake is also considered a favorable fishing location for Northern Pike. The facilities are maintained under the authority of the Coconino National Forest.

The lake has two campgrounds, Ashurst Lake on the west shore and Forked Pine on the east shore.

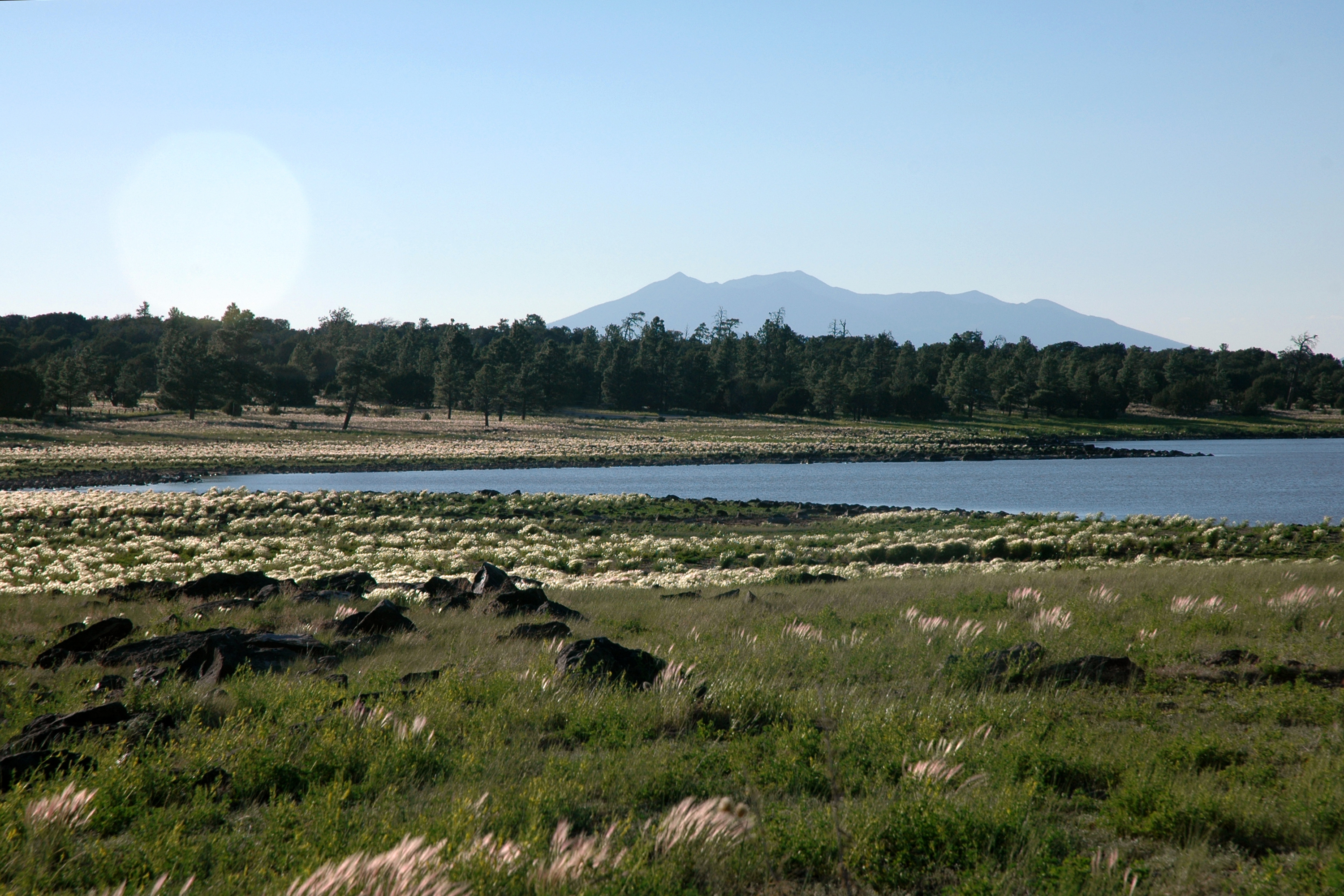
The southern end of Ashurst Lake in early summer

== Fish species ==
- Rainbow Trout
- Brook Trout
