= Soldiers Lake =

Waterbody in Coconino County, Arizona

- Location within Arizona Location within the United States
- Location: Coconino County, Arizona, United States
- Coordinates: 34°47′53.1″N 111°13′50.9″W
- Basin countries: United States
- Surface area: 30 acres (12 ha)
- Average depth: 8 ft (2.4 m)
- Max. depth: 15 ft (4.6 m)
- Surface elevation: 6,778 ft (2,066 m)

Soldiers Lake is located 75 miles (121 km) southeast of Flagstaff in the state of Arizona. The facilities are maintained by Coconino National Forest division of the USDA Forest Service.

== Fish species ==
- Channel Catfish
- Walleye
- Northern Pike
- Bluegill
- Largemouth Bass
- Golden Shiner
- Crayfish
