= Woodland Reservoir (Arizona) =

Waterbody in Navajo County

- Location within Arizona Location within the United States
- Location: Navajo County, Arizona, United States
- Coordinates: 34°7′36″N 109°57′7″W
- Type: Reservoir
- Primary inflows: Walnut Creek
- Primary outflows: Walnut Creek
- Basin countries: United States
- Surface area: 10 acres (4.0 ha)
- Average depth: 4 ft (1.2 m)
- Max. depth: 20 ft (6.1 m)
- Surface elevation: 6,893 ft (2,101 m)

Located in the heart of Pinetop-Lakeside, Woodland Lake and the park surrounding it have been called the town's "Crown Jewel." In addition to trout fishing, the lake provides a host of other outdoor recreation opportunities. Woodland Lake lies on city and Apache-Sitgraves National Forest property, just west of White Mountain Blvd. in Pinetop.

== Description ==
Woodland Lake is situated at 6,893 feet (2,101 m). At full capacity, it has a surface area of 18 acres (7.3 ha) with a maximum depth of 20 feet (6.1 m). Because the lake is part of the local irrigation district, at drawdown, it averages 10 acres (4.0 ha). It is shallow and nutrient rich, making it subject to water quality problems in the summer. For this reason, the lake is stocked primarily with catchable-sized rainbow trout in the spring and early summer. The lake also contains a few largemouth bass and channel catfish.

== Amenities ==
The town of Pinetop-Lakeside maintains Woodland Park, which includes hiking trails, picnic tables and ramadas, barrier-free restrooms, a sand volleyball court, tennis court, two children's playgrounds, some ball fields, a boat ramp and a barrier-free, floating fishing dock.

== Fish species ==
- Rainbow trout(stocked in Spring and early Summer)
- Largemouth Bass
- Bluegill
- Green Sunfish
- Channel catfish
- Fathead Minnows
- Crayfish
- American Bullfrogs
