= Red Mountain Lake =

Waterbody in Maricopa County, Arizona

- Location within Arizona
- Location: Mesa, Arizona
- Coordinates: 33°26′0″N 111°40′9″W
- Basin countries: United States
- Surface area: 8 acres (3.2 ha)
- Average depth: 12 ft (3.7 m)
- Surface elevation: 1,100 ft (340 m)
- Islands: 1
- Settlements: Mesa

Red Mountain Lake is a small, man-made lake located in Red Mountain Park in Mesa, Arizona, United States, roughly between Power and Ellsworth Roads at Brown Road. It covers 8 acres and has a maximum depth of 17 feet.

== Fish species ==
- Rainbow Trout
- Largemouth Bass
- Sunfish
- Catfish (Channel)
- Carp
