= Silverbell Lake =

Waterbody in Pima County, Arizona

- Location within Arizona
- Location: Tucson, Arizona, United States
- Coordinates: 32°17′6″N 111°2′2″W
- Type: reservoir
- Basin countries: United States
- Surface area: 13 acres (5.3 ha)
- Average depth: 5 ft (1.5 m)
- Surface elevation: 2,000 ft (610 m)
- Settlements: Tucson

Silverbell Lake is located in Christopher Columbus Park in western Tucson, east of Silverbell Road between Camino del Cerro and Grant Roads, in the U.S. state of Arizona.

== Fish species ==
- Rainbow trout
- Largemouth bass
- Smallmouth bass
- Sunfish
- Channel catfish
- Carp
