= Water Ranch Lake =

Lake in Gilbert, Arizona

Riparian Preserve at Water Ranch
- Location within Arizona
- Location: 2757 E. Guadalupe Rd., Gilbert, Arizona 85234
- Coordinates: 33°21′47.75″N 111°44′09.80″W
- Basin countries: United States
- Surface area: 110 acres (45 ha)
- Average depth: 11 ft (3.4 m)
- Surface elevation: 1,100 ft (340 m)
- Settlements: Gilbert

Riparian Preserve at Water Ranch is a lake located in Gilbert, Arizona, United States, east of Greenfield Rd and south of Guadalupe Rd. The preserve was created by the Town of Gilbert in 1999 to combine water resources, wildlife habitat, educational programs, and recreational opportunities. The Riparian Preserve consists of 110 acres, with 70 acres of 7 water recharge basins.

The Riparian Preserve also includes over 4.5 miles of trails that lead to various vegetative zones, gardens, a paleontology dig site, and an observatory. The Preserve houses approximately 298 species of birds, insects, fish, amphibians, reptiles, and mammals.

== Fish species ==
- Rainbow Trout
- Largemouth Bass
- Sunfish
- Catfish (Channel)
- Tilapia
- Carp
