= Surprise Lake (Arizona) =

Waterbody in Maricopa County, Arizona

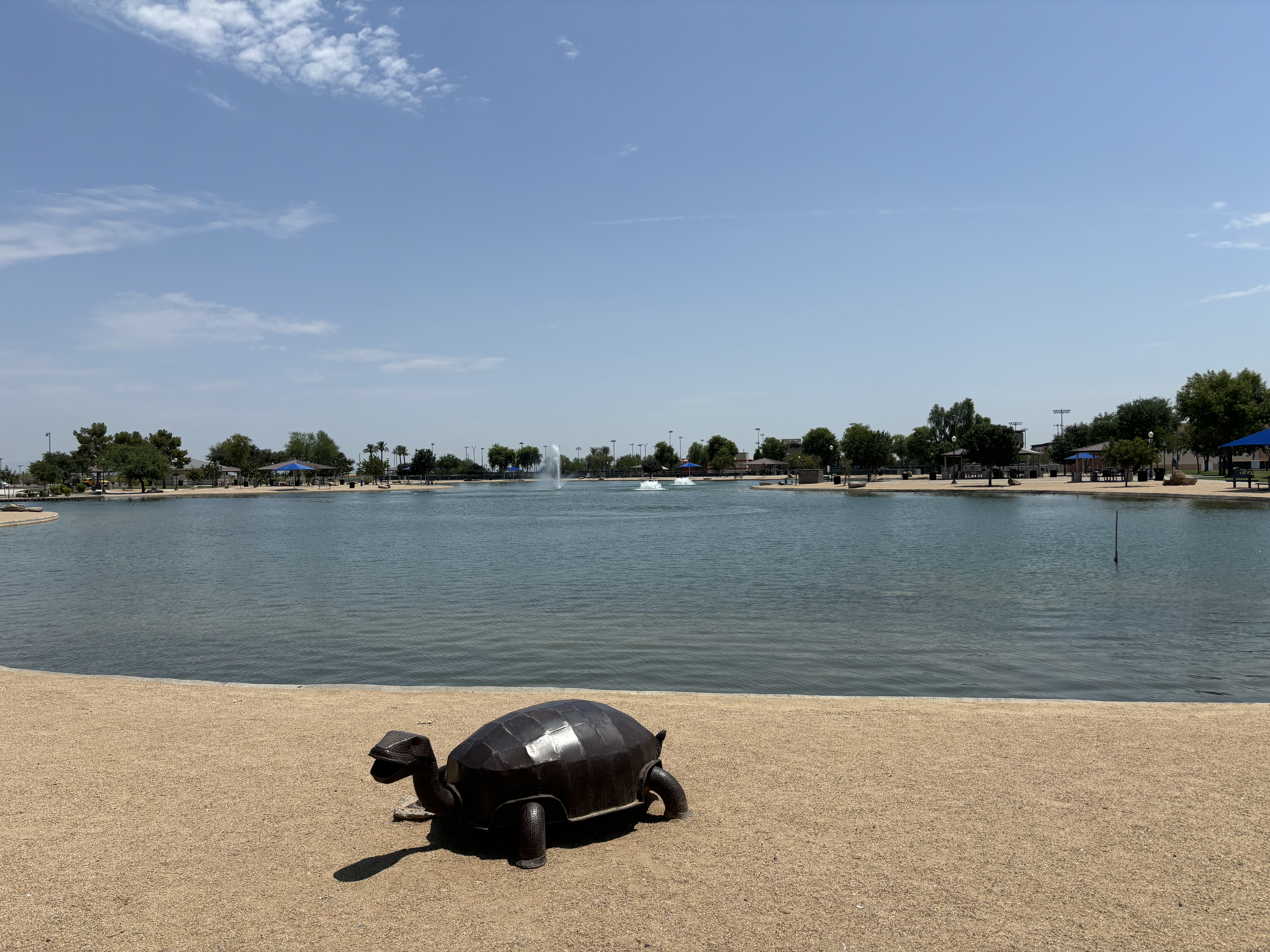

- Location within Arizona Location within the United States
- Location: Surprise, Arizona
- Coordinates: 33°38′27.83″N 112°22′31.98″W
- Basin countries: United States
- Surface area: 5 acres (2.0 ha)
- Average depth: 8 ft (2.4 m)
- Max. depth: 12 ft (3.7 m)
- Surface elevation: 1,100 ft (340 m)
- Settlements: Surprise

Surprise Lake is located in the City of Surprise, Arizona, United States, on the Surprise Recreation Campus in the north-west Valley, between Bell Road and Greenway on the east side of Bullard Avenue.

== Fish species ==
- Rainbow trout
- Largemouth bass
- Sunfish
- Catfish (channel)
- Tilapia
- Grass carp
