= Long Lake (Arizona) =

Lake in Coconino County, Arizona, US

- Location within Arizona Location within the United States
- Location: Coconino County, Arizona, United States
- Coordinates: 34°46′48″N 111°12′17″W
- Basin countries: United States
- Surface area: 268 acres (108 ha)
- Average depth: 25 ft (7.6 m)
- Surface elevation: 6,700 ft (2,000 m)

Long Lake is located in the Mogollon Rim area of the state of Arizona. It is located 75 miles (121 km) southeast of Flagstaff. The facilities are maintained by Coconino National Forest division of the USDA Forest Service. It is named after a legend of a long serpent type creature that was reportedly seen by ranchers as they herd cattle near the lake.

== Fish species ==
- Rainbow Trout
- Largemouth Bass
- Sunfish
- Channel Catfish
- Northern Pike
- Walleye
