= Arizona Game and Fish Department =

State agency of Arizona

Agency overview
- Jurisdiction: Arizona, United States
- Headquarters: 5000 West Carefree Highway; Phoenix, Arizona 85086-5000
- Annual budget: $117.6 million (FY2018)
- Agency executives: Ty E. Gray, Director; Tom P. Finley, Deputy Director
- Parent agency: Arizona Game and Fish Commission
- Website: https://www.azgfd.gov

Map

The Arizona Game and Fish Department is a state agency of Arizona, headquartered in Phoenix. The agency is tasked with conserving, enhancing, and restoring Arizona's diverse wildlife resources and habitats through protection and management programs.

== Operations ==
The Arizona Game and Fish Department is funded primarily by revenues generated through the sale of hunting and fishing licenses, tags, and stamps, as well as the discretionary purchases of hunters and anglers; it does not receive tax funding through the Arizona State General Fund.

== Wildlife conservation ==
The Arizona Game and Fish Department has developed a "Comprehensive Wildlife Conservation Strategy" (CWCS)—a 10-year vision for managing Arizona’s fish, wildlife and natural habitats, input and partnerships with various agency cooperators, sportsman and recreational groups, conservation organizations, special interest groups, Native American tribes, county and municipal governments, and the general public.

== Watchable wildlife ==
Arizona is home to more than 900 animal species and 50 million public acres of natural land. The Arizona Wildlife Viewing Program strives to manage wildlife while providing for the responsible recreational use of the resource. Much of the support for the program comes from the Heritage Fund, a fund started in 1990 by Arizona voters to further conservation efforts in the state. Funding comes from Arizona Lottery ticket sales.

== Drought and wildlife ==
The Arizona Game and Fish Department maintains 3,000 water catchments located throughout Arizona. The catchments provide water to wildlife year-round and particularly during the state's hot, dry summer months. Arizona Game and Fish deliver water to the catchments via trucks and airlifts. In 2020, 2.4 million gallons of water were delivered to fill the catchments, the first of which were constructed in the 1940s.

== Staff ==
Highest salary at Game And Fish Dept in year 2018 was $159,999. Number of employees at Game And Fish Dept in year 2018 was 745. Average annual salary was $44,299 and median salary was $47,235. Game And Fish Dept. average salary is 5 percent lower than USA average and median salary is 9 percent higher than USA median.

== See also ==
- List of law enforcement agencies in Arizona
- Game Warden
- Ben Avery Shooting Facility
- List of state and territorial fish and wildlife management agencies in the United States
