= North Central Arizona =

Geographical region in the United States

Coordinates: 34.75°N 111.55°W

North Central Arizona is a geographical region of Arizona. Much of it is within the Transition Zone between the Basin and Range Province and the Colorado Plateau, and has some of the most rugged and scenic landscapes in Arizona.

As part of the southern Colorado Plateau (Mogollon Plateau) it has an average elevation of 4,000–5,000 feet.

Physiographic Features

- Mogollon Rim
- San Francisco Volcanic Field
- Humphrey's Peak, the highest peak in Arizona at 12,633 feet.
- Barringer Crater (a.k.a. Meteor Crater)
- Mormon Lake
- Oak Creek Canyon
- Verde Valley
- Mingus Mountain, (Black Hills (Arizona))
- Verde Rim
- Red Rock Country; see Sedona and Village of Oak Creek, Arizona
- Bradshaw Mountains
- Granite Mountain (Arizona)
- Little Colorado River
- Fossil Creek Canyon

National Monuments:

- Wupatki
- Sunset Crater
- Walnut Canyon
- Montezuma Castle
- Tuzigoot

Arizona State Parks

- Riordan Mansion
- Slide Rock
- Red Rock
- Dead Horse Ranch
- Jerome
- Fort Verde
- Tonto Natural Bridge

Cities/Towns:

- Williams, Arizona
- Flagstaff, Arizona
- Sedona, Arizona
- Village of Oak Creek, Arizona
- Jerome, Arizona
- Ash Fork, Arizona
- Paulden, Arizona
- Chino Valley, Arizona
- Prescott, Arizona
- Prescott Valley, Arizona
- Humboldt, Arizona
- Dewey, Arizona
- Mayer, Arizona
- Spring Valley, Arizona
- Cordes Lakes, Arizona
- Cottonwood, Arizona
- Camp Verde, Arizona
- Clarkdale, Arizona
- Cornville, Arizona
- Lake Montezuma, Arizona
- Payson, Arizona
- Strawberry, Arizona
- Pine, Arizona
- Pinetop-Lakeside, Arizona
- Show Low, Arizona
