= List of amusement parks in the Americas =

The following is a list of amusement parks in the Americas sorted by region.

== North America ==
=== Canada ===
Name	Location	Year Established
Calaway Park	Calgary, Alberta	1982
Canyon Ski Resort	Red Deer, Alberta	1961
Barneys Adventure Park	Drumheller, Alberta	2021
Galaxyland	Edmonton, Alberta	1983
Heritage Park Historical Village	Calgary, Alberta	1964
Fort Edmonton Park	Edmonton, Alberta	1974
Jurassic Forest	Gibbons, Alberta	2010
Castle Fun Park	Abbotsford, British Columbia	1989
Cultus Lake Adventure Park	Cultus Lake, British Columbia	2014
Cypress Mountain	West Vancouver, British Columbia	1970
Golden Skybridge	Golden, British Columbia	2021
Playland	Vancouver, British Columbia	1929
Rattlesnake Canyon	Osoyoos, British Columbia	1998
Revelstoke Mountain Resort	Revelstoke, British Columbia	2007
Castle Fun Park	Abbotsford, British Columbia	1989
Tinkertown Family Fun Park	Winnipeg, Manitoba	1994
Magic Mountain	Moncton, New Brunswick	1987
Atlantic Splash Adventure	Hammonds Plains, Nova Scotia	1995
Blue Mountain Adventure Park	The Blue Mountains, Ontario	1941
Canada's Wonderland	Vaughan, Ontario	1981
Centreville Amusement Park	Toronto Islands, Ontario	1967
Chippewa Park	Thunder Bay, Ontario	1921
Clifton Hill, Niagara Falls	Niagara Falls, Ontario	1925
Neb's Funworld	Oshawa, Ontario	1987
Santa's Village	Bracebridge, Ontario	1955
Storybook Park	Owen Sound, Ontario	1975
Storybook Gardens	London, Ontario	1958
Sandspit Cavendish Beach	Cavendish, Prince Edward Island	1984
Shining Waters Family Fun Park	Cavendish, Prince Edward Island	2006
Au Pays des Merveilles	Sainte-Adèle, Québec	1994
Camp Fortune	Chelsea, Quebec	1920
La Ronde: A Six Flags Park	Montréal, Québec	1967
F.U.N Park	Saint-Sauveur, Québec	2012
Mega Parc	Québec City, Québec	1988
Parc Johnny Test at Ses Amis	Granby, Québec	2015

=== Costa Rica ===
- Parque de Diversiones Dr. Roberto Ortiz Brenes – San José

=== Cuba ===
- Parque de diversiones en La Habana – La Habana
- Parque de diversiones en Santiago – Santiago

=== El Salvador ===
- Sunset Park – La Libertad

=== Guatemala ===
- Xetulul Theme Park – Retalhuleu
- Xejuyup Adventure Park – Retalhuleu
- Mundo Petapa Theme Park – Guatemala City

=== Jamaica ===
- Aquasol Theme Park – Montego Bay
- Funland Park – Kingston
- Mystic Mountain Jamaica – Ocho Rios

=== Mexico ===
- Aktun Chen
- Barrio Frenesí – Morelos and Puebla
- Bosque de Aragon – Mexico City
- Bosque Mágico – Guadalupe
- Chankanaab Park
- Croco-Cun
- DivertiDIF – Chihuahua
- Imagic Park – Naucalpan de Juarez
- Juegos Mecanicos Del Bosque – Torreon
- Kataplum – Mexico City
- Lago Mayer Alameda Oriente – Mexico City
- Los Veranos Canopy Tour – Boca de Tomatlán
- Mundo Divertido – Tijuana
- Parque de Diversiones Quiqueland – Mexquitic de Carmona
- Parque de la Selva – Leon
- Parque Bicentenario – Santa Rose Jauregui
- Parque Borunda – Ciudad Juarez
- Parque Del Refugio – Guadalajara
- Parque Eme – Culiacan
- Parque Francisco Villa – Mexico City
- Parque Guadiana – Durango
- Parque Heroes Mexicanos – Aguascalientes
- Parque Infantil Cuauhtemoc – Morelia
- Parque Infantil Miguel Hidalgo – Aguascalientes
- Parque Infantil Ostimuri – Ciudad Obregon
- Parque Infantil Sonora – Hermosillo
- Parque Los Valentinos – Guadalajara
- Parque Plaza Sésamo – Monterrey
- Parque Xochipilli – Celaya
- Perimagico – Cuatlitlán Itzcalli
- Selva Magica – Guadalajara
- Selvática - The Adventure Tribe – Puerto Morelos
- Six Flags México – Mexico City
- Splash – Nuevo Mexico
- Ventura Park – Cancun
- VidantaWorld – Nuevo Vallarta
- Villa Alegria – Guadalajara
- Xcaret Park – Riviera Maya
- Xel-Ha Park – Solidaridad
- Xavage – Riviera Maya
- Pensé – Riviera Maya
- Xplor Park – Riviera Maya

=== Trinidad & Tobago ===
- Five Islands Water & Amusement Park – Chagville Beach

=== United States ===
==== Alabama ====
- 4D Farm – Cullman
- Alabama Adventure & Splash Adventure – Bessemer
- Athens Lions Club Kiddie Carnival – Athens
- Spring Park – Tuscumbia
- Track Family Fun Park – Gulf Shores
- Tropic Falls Theme Park – Foley

==== Alaska ====
- Pioneer Park – Fairbanks

==== Arizona ====
- Canyon Coaster Adventure Park – Williams
- Castles N' Coasters – Phoenix
- Dreamport Villages – Casa Grande
- Enchanted Island Amusement Park – Phoenix
- Golfland Sunsplash – Mesa
- Phoenix Park 'n Swap – Phoenix
- Schnepf Farms – Queen Creek
- Sunrise Park Resort – Greer
- Tanque Verde Swap – Tucson
- Wildlife World – Litchfield Park

==== Arkansas ====
- Magic Springs – Hot Springs

==== California ====
Northern California

- Blackbeard's Family Entertainment Center – Fresno
- Boomers – Livermore and Modesto
- California's Great America – Santa Clara
- Children's Fairyland – Oakland
- Fairytale Town – Sacramento
- Funderland Amusement Park – Sacramento
- Gilroy Gardens Family Theme Park – Gilroy
- Golfland – Castro Valley, Fairfield, Milpitas, Roseville, San Jose, and Sunnyvale
- Happy Hollow Park and Zoo – San Jose
- Historic Hawes Farms – Anderson
- Heavenly Mountain Resort – South Lake Tahoe
- John's Incredible Pizza Company – Fresno, Modesto, and Roseville
- Kiwanis Kiddieland – Merced
- Playland Fresno – Fresno
- Pixieland Amusement Park – Concord
- Rotary Storyland and Playland – Fresno
- Santa Cruz Beach Boardwalk – Santa Cruz
- Scandia Family Fun Center – Sacramento
- Six Flags Discovery Kingdom – Vallejo
- Sonoma TrainTown Railroad – Sonoma

Southern California

- Adventure City – Anaheim
- Alpine Slide at Magic Mountain – Big Bear Lake
- Belmont Park – San Diego
- Boomers – Irvine, Palm Springs, Santa Maria, and Vista
- Castle Park – Riverside
- Disneyland – Anaheim
- Disney California Adventure – Anaheim
- Golf N' Stuff – Norwalk and Ventura
- Golfland – Anaheim
- John's Incredible Pizza Company – Carson and Roseville
- Knott's Berry Farm – Buena Park
- Legoland California – Carlsbad
- Live Oak Canyon Farm – Redlands
- Mountasia Family Fun Center – Valencia
- Mulligan Family Fun Center – Murrieta
- Pacific Park – Santa Monica
- Scandia Family Fun Center – Victorville
- SeaWorld San Diego – San Diego
- Sesame Place San Diego – Chula Vista
- Six Flags Magic Mountain – Valencia
- SpeedZone – City of Industry
- SpeedZone Los Angeles – Los Angeles
- Universal Studios Hollywood – Universal City

==== Colorado ====
- Aspen Snowmass Ski Resort – Snowmass Village
- Breckenridge Ski Resort – Breckenridge
- City Park – Pueblo
- Copper Mountain – Frisco
- Elitch Gardens – Denver
- Glenwood Caverns Adventure Park – Glenwood Springs
- Lakeside Amusement Park – Lakeside
- Mile High Flea Market – Henderson
- Mustang Mountain Coaster – Estes Park
- Purgatory Resort – Durango
- Santa's Workshop – Cascade
- Vail Adventure Ridge – Vail

==== Connecticut ====
- Lake Compounce – Bristol
- Ocean Beach – New London
- Quassy Amusement Park – Middlebury

==== Delaware ====
- Funland – Rehoboth Beach

==== Florida ====
Central Florida

North Florida

- Kirby Family Farm – Williston
- Race City PCB – Panama City Beach
- Swampy Jack's Wongo Adventure – Panama City Beach
- Track Recreation Center – Destin

South Florida

- American Dream Miami – Miami-Dade County (opening 2026)
- FastTrax Entertainment – Fort Myers Beach

==== Georgia ====
- Georgia Mountain Coaster – Helen
- Keller's Flea Market – Savannah
- Lake Winnepesaukah – Rossville
- Six Flags Over Georgia – Austell
- Wild Adventures – Valdosta

==== Idaho ====
- Bogus Basin Mountain Recreation Area – Horseshoe Bend
- Silverwood Theme Park – Athol
- Yellowstone Bear World – Rexburg

==== Illinois ====
- Aerie's Resort & Winery – Grafton
- Bengtson's Pumpkin Farm – Homer Glen
- Enchanted Castle – Lombard
- Grady's Family Fun Park – Bloomington
- Haunted Trails (entertainment center) – Burbank and Joliet
- Malibu Jack's – Springfield
- People's Choice Family Fun Center – Waukegan
- Safari Land – Villa Park
- Santa's Village AZoosment Park – East Dundee
- Scene75 Entertainment Center – Romeoville
- Six Flags Great America – Gurnee
- Sonny Acres Farm – West Chicago

==== Indiana ====
- Fun Center at Paige's Crossing – Columbia City
- Harvest Tyme Pumpkin Patch – Lowell
- Holiday World & Splashin' Safari – Santa Claus
- Indiana Beach – Monticello
- Lark Ranch – Greenfield and Loogootee
- Malibu Jack's – Lafayette
- Zao Island – Valparaiso

==== Iowa ====
- Adventureland – Altoona
- Arnolds Park – Arnolds Park
- Lost Island Theme Park – Waterloo
- Malibu Jack's – Bettendorf
- Modern Woodmen Park – Davenport

==== Kansas ====
- Kiddieland – Pittsburg

==== Kentucky ====
- Beech Bend Park – Bowling Green
- Kentucky Kingdom – Louisville
- Malibu Jack's Indoor Theme Park – Ashland, Lexington, and Louisville

==== Louisiana ====
- Blue Bayou and Dixie Landin' – Baton Rouge
- Carousel Gardens Amusement Park – New Orleans

==== Maine ====
- Funtown Splashtown USA – Saco
- Palace Playland – Old Orchard Beach
- York's Wild Kingdom – York Beach

==== Maryland ====
- Adventure Park USA – New Market
- Hebron Fireman's Carnival – Heborn
- Jolly Roger Amusement Park – Ocean City
- Jolly Roger at the Pier – Ocean City
- Sharptown Firemen's Carnival – Sharptown
- Trimper's Rides – Ocean City
- Wisp Resort – McHenry

==== Massachusetts ====
- Berkshire East – Charlemont
- Edaville Family Theme Park – Carver
- Jiminy Peak Mountain Resort – Hancock
- Six Flags New England – Agawam

==== Michigan ====
- Airway Fun Center – Portage
- Arzo Sports & Fun Park – Alpena
- Cedar Valley's Wild Frontier Fun Park – Comins
- CJ Barrymore's Family Entertainment Center – Clinton Township
- Craig's Cruisers Family Fun Center – Mears and Wyoming
- Michigan's Adventure – Muskegon
- Nelis' Dutch Village – Holland

==== Minnesota ====
- Como Town – St. Paul
- Kiddie Land – Cormorant
- Nickelodeon Universe – Bloomington
- Paul Bunyan Land – Brainerd
- Spirit Mountain – Duluth
- Valleyfair – Shakopee

==== Mississippi ====
- Big Play Entertainment Center – Biloxi
- Brookhaven Exchange Club Park – Brookhaven
- Paradise Pier Fun Park – Biloxi

==== Missouri ====
- Branson Mountain Adventure Park – Branson
- The Branson Coaster – Branson
- Incredible Pizza Company – Springfield
- Mid America Adventure – Eureka
- Miner Mike's Adventure Town – Osage Beach
- Oasis at Lakeport – Osage Beach (opening 2026)
- PowerPlay Family Entertainment Center – Kansas City
- Shepherd's Adventure Park – Branson
- Silver Dollar City – Branson
- St. Louis Union Station – St. Louis
- Track Family Fun Parks – Branson
- Worlds of Fun – Kansas City

==== Montana ====
- Flathead Lake Alpine Coaster – Lakeside

==== Nebraska ====
- Fun-Plex – Omaha

==== Nevada ====
- Adventuredome – Las Vegas
- Buffalo Bill's – Primm
- Las Vegas Mini Gran Prix – Las Vegas
- New York-New York Hotel and Casino – Las Vegas
- The Strat – Las Vegas

==== New Hampshire ====
- Attitash Mountain Resort – Bartlett
- Canobie Lake Park – Salem
- Cranmore Mountain Adventure Park – North Conway
- Funworld Game Center – Nashua
- Gunstock Mountain Resort – Gilford
- Santa's Village – Jefferson
- Story Land – Glen

==== New Jersey ====
- Casino Pier – Seaside Heights
- Clementon Park and Splash World – Clementon
- Fantasy Island Amusement Park – Beach Haven
- Funplex – Mount Laurel
- Gillian's Wonderland Pier – Ocean City
- iPlay America – Freehold
- Jenkinson's Boardwalk – Point Pleasant Beach
- Keansburg Amusement Park – Keansburg
- Land of Make Believe – Hope
- Morey's Piers – Wildwood
- Mountain Creek Waterpark – Vernon
- Nickelodeon Universe – East Rutherford
- Playland's Castaway Cove – Ocean City
- Six Flags Great Adventure – Jackson
- Steel Pier – Atlantic City
- Storybook Land – Egg Harbor Township
- Wild West City – Byram Township, New Jersey
- Diggerland USA - Berlin Township, New Jersey

==== New Mexico ====
- Cliff's Amusement Park – Albuquerque
- Ruidoso Winter Park – Ruidoso
- Western Playland – Sunland Park

==== New York ====
Downstate New York

- Adventureland – Farmingdale
- Adventurer's Park – Brooklyn
- Deno's Wonder Wheel Amusement Park – Coney Island, Brooklyn
- Fantasy Forest at the Flushing Meadows Carousel – Flushing
- Kids 'N Action – Brooklyn
- Luna Park – Coney Island, Brooklyn
- Playland – Rye

Upstate New York

- Castle Fun Center – Chester
- Eldridge Park – Elmira
- Enchanted Forest Water Safari – Old Forge
- Great Escape – Lake George
- Greek Peak Mountain Resort – Cortland
- Holiday Valley – Ellicottville
- Huck Finn's Playland – Albany
- Legoland New York – Goshen
- Midway State Park – Maple Springs
- Lake George Expedition Park – Lake George
- Mount Van Hoevenberg – Lake Placid
- Niagara Amusement Park & Splash World – Grand Island
- Olcott Beach Carousel Park – Olcott
- Santa's Workshop – Wilmington
- Seabreeze Amusement Park – Rochester
- Six Flags Darien Lake – Darien
- Sylvan Beach Amusement Park – Sylvan Beach

==== North Carolina ====
- Carowinds – Charlotte
- Deadwood – Williamston
- Frankie's – Raleigh and Charlotte
- Santa's Land – Cherokee
- Scaly Mountain Outdoor Center – Scaly Mountain
- Tweetsie Railroad – Boone
- Wilderness Run Alpine Coaster – Banner Elk
- Yogi Bear's Jellystone Park Camp-Resort – Bostic

==== North Dakota ====
- Lucy's Amusement Park – Minot
- Super Slide Amusement Park – Bismarck

==== Ohio ====
- Cedar Point – Sandusky
- FunTimes Fun Park – Alliance
- Hall of Fame Village – Canton
- Howard's Apples Farm Market – Bainbridge
- Kings Island – Mason
- Memphis Kiddie Park – Brooklyn
- Rides At Adventure Cove in Columbus Zoo and Aquarium – Powell
- Scene75 Entertainment Center – Dayton and Dublin
- Sluggers & Putters – Canal Fulton
- Stricker's Grove – Ross
- Tuscora Park – New Philadelphia

==== Oklahoma ====
- Frontier City – Oklahoma City
- Incredible Pizza Company – Warr Acres
- Kiddie Park – Bartlesville
- Tulsa's Incredible Pizza Company – Tulsa

==== Oregon ====
- Captain Kid Amusement Park – Seaside
- Enchanted Forest – Turner
- Oaks Amusement Park – Portland

==== Pennsylvania ====
- Bushkill Park – Easton
- Camelback Mountain Resort – Tannersville
- Carousel Village at Indian Walk – Wrightstown
- Conneaut Lake Park – Conneaut Lake
- DelGrosso's Amusement Park – Tipton
- Dorney Park & Wildwater Kingdom – Allentown (Dorneyville)
- Dutch Wonderland – Lancaster
- Fun Fore All Family Fun Park – Cranberry Township
- Hersheypark – Hershey
- Idlewild and Soak Zone – Ligonier
- Kennywood – West Mifflin
- Knoebels Amusement Resort – Elysburg
- Lakemont Park – Altoona
- Sesame Place Philadelphia – Langhorne
- Waldameer & Water World – Erie

==== Rhode Island ====
- Atlantic Beach Park – Westerly

==== South Carolina ====
- Family Kingdom Amusement Park – Myrtle Beach
- The Funplex Myrtle Beach – Myrtle Beach
- O.D. Pavilion Amusement Park – North Myrtle Beach
- Pavilion Park – Myrtle Beach
- Pedroland – Dillon
- Track Family Fun – Myrtle Beach

==== South Dakota ====
- Fort Hays Chuckwagon – Rapid City
- Rush Mountain Adventure Park – Keystone
- Storybook Land – Aberdeen

==== Tennessee ====
- Anakeesta – Gatlinburg
- Cool Runnings Alpine Coaster – Pigeon Forge
- Dig'n Zone – Sevierville
- Dollywood – Pigeon Forge
- Goats on the Roof of the Smokies – Pigeon Forge
- Incredible Pizza Company – Cordova
- The Island in Pigeon Forge – Pigeon Forge
- Jurassic Jungle Boat Ride – Pigeon Forge
- Lumberjack Feud Adventure Park – Pigeon Forge
- Moonshine Mountain Coaster – Gatlinburg
- NASCAR Speedpark – Sevierville
- Ober Gatlinburg – Gatlinburg
- Pigeon Forge Racing Coaster - Pigeon Forge
- Rocky Top Mountain Coaster – Pigeon Forge
- Rowdy Bear Mountain – Gatlinburg
- Rowdy Bear Ridge Adventure Park – Pigeon Forge
- SkyLand Ranch – Sevierville
- Smoky Mountain Alpine Coaster – Pigeon Forge
- Wilderness at the Smokies – Sevierville

==== Texas ====
Central Texas

- Austin's Park N Pizza – Pflugerville
- Camp Fimfo Texas Hill Country – Canyon Lake
- COTALAND – Austin
- Incredible Pizza Company – San Antonio
- Kiddie Park Of San Antonio – San Antonio
- Landa Park – New Braunfels
- Morgan's Wonderland – San Antonio
- SeaWorld San Antonio – San Antonio
- Six Flags Fiesta Texas – San Antonio
- Tom Foolerys Adventure Park – Round Rock

Coastal Texas

- Big Rivers Waterpark & Adventures – New Caney
- Downtown Aquarium – Houston
- Elise's Family Fun Center – Winnie
- Funplex – Houston
- Galveston Island Historic Pleasure Pier – Galveston
- Gravity Park – South Padre Island
- In The Game Funtrackers – Corpus Christi
- P-6 Farms – Montgomery
- Kemah Boardwalk – Kemah
- Outlaw Pass – Victoria
- Tilt Studio – Beaumont (inside Parkdale Mall) and Katy (inside Katy Mills)

Northern Texas

- Alley Cats – Hurst
- Mainstay Farm – Cleburne
- Mr. Gatti's Pizza – Abilene
- iT'Z Family Food & Fun – Euless
- Peppa Pig Theme Park – North Richland Hills
- Prairie Playland – Grand Prairie
- Richland Chambers – Winkler
- Six Flags Over Texas – Arlington
- Traders Village – Grand Prairie
- Universal Kids Resort – Frisco (opening 2026)
- Wonderland Park – Amarillo
- YesterLand Farm – Canton

==== Utah ====
- Evermore Park – Pleasant Grove
- Lagoon – Farmington
- Park City Mountain Resort – Park City
- Ricochet Canyon – West Jordan
- Snowbird – Sandy

==== Vermont ====
- Killington Resort – Killington
- Okemo Mountain Resort – Ludlow
- Quechee Gorge Village – Quechee

==== Virginia ====
- Atlantic Fun Park – Virginia Beach
- Busch Gardens Williamsburg – Williamsburg
- Fun Land of Fredericksburg – Fredericksburg
- Go-Karts Plus – Williamsburg
- Kings Dominion – Doswell
- Massanutten Family Fun Park – Massanutten
- Motor World – Virginia Beach

==== Washington ====
- Country Mercantile – Pasco
- Leavenworth Adventure Park – Leavenworth
- Playtime Family Fun – Washington
- Remlinger Farms – Carnation
- Sport Wenatchee – Wenatchee
- Washington State Fair – Puyallup
- Wild Waves Theme Park – Federal Way

==== West Virginia ====
- Camden Park – Huntington

==== Wisconsin ====
- Bay Beach Amusement Park – Green Bay
- Little Amerricka – Marshall
- Mt. Olympus Water & Theme Park – Wisconsin Dells
- Tom Foolerys Adventure Park – Wisconsin Dells
- Wisconsin Dells Mountain Coaster - Wisconsin Dells

==== Wyoming ====
- Snow King Mountain – Jackson Hole

==== Puerto Rico ====
- Children's Dream Park – Añasco
- Villa Campestre – Guaynabo

== South America ==
=== Argentina ===
- Parque de la Ciudad – Buenos Aires
- Parque de la Costa – Tigre, Buenos Aires Province

=== Brazil ===
- Acqua Lokos Parque Hotel – Capão da Canoa, Rio Grande do Sul
- Alpen Park – Canela, Rio Grande do Sul
- Alles Park – Pomerode, Santa Catarina
- Animália Park – Cotia, São Paulo
- Beto Carrero World – Penha, Santa Catarina
- Cacau Park – Itu, São Paulo (opening 2027)
- Cidade da Criança – São Bernardo do Campo, São Paulo
- Hopi Hari – Vinhedo, São Paulo
- Kitakas Park – Caldas Novas, Goiás
- Nicolândia Center Park – Brasília
- Parque Guanabara – Belo Horizonte
- Parque Marisa – São Paulo
- Parque Mutirama – Goiânia
- Parque Shanghai – Rio de Janeiro
- Play City – Rio de Janeiro
- Playcenter Family – São Paulo
- Snowland – Gramado, Rio Grande do Sul

=== Chile ===
- Fantasilandia – Santiago
- Bosque Encantado Pucón – Pucón
- Mampato Lo Barnechea – Lo Barnechea, Santiago
- Mampato Puente Alto – Puente Alto, Santiago
- Sendero Mágico Parque Mitológico – Las Cabras
- Ex Mundo Mágico – Lo Prado, Santiago
- Ripaluna Parque Temático – Paihuano
- Érase una vez – Pucón

=== Colombia ===
- Parque Norte – Medellín, Antioquía
- Divercity – Bogotá
- Mundo Aventura – Bogotá
- Salitre Magico – Parque el Salitre, Bogotá
- Parque Jaime Duque – Tocancipá
- Parque del Café – Montenegro, Quindío
- PANACA – Quimbaya, Quindío

=== Ecuador ===
- Vulqano Park – Quito
- El Pisque Adventure Park
- Universal Studios Ecuador Resort – Quito

=== Venezuela ===
- Aguamania – Maracaibo, Zulia
- La Venezuela de Antier – Mérida, Mérida
- Los Aleros – Mérida, Mérida
- Musipan – Margarita Island, Nueva Esparta
- Parque El Agua – Margarita Island, Nueva Esparta
- Parque Kariña – Piritu, Anzoategui
- Diverxity – Caracas
- DUNAS – Valencia

== See also ==
- List of amusement parks
- List of defunct amusement parks
- List of tourist attractions worldwide
- List of water parks in the Americas
- Tourist attractions in the United States
- Family entertainment center
