= Sunset Park =

Sunset Park may refer to:

== Places in North America ==
- Sunset Park, Las Vegas, Nevada, a park
- Sunset Park, Brooklyn, New York, a neighborhood
  - Sunset Park (Brooklyn park), the namesake park
- Sunset Park, Santa Monica, California, a neighborhood
- Sunset Hill Viewpoint Park, Seattle, Washington, a neighborhood and namesake park
- Sunset Park, Tampa, Florida, a neighborhood
- Sunset Park Elementary School, Miami, Florida
- Sunset Park Historic District, Wilmington, North Carolina
- Sunset Park, Ontario
- Sunset Park, La Libertad

== Other uses ==
- Sunset Park (film), a 1996 film
- Sunset Park (soundtrack), the soundtrack to the film above
- Sunset Park (novel), a novel by Paul Auster, 2010
- "Sunset Park", a song by Angels of Light from Everything Is Good Here/Please Come Home
