= Scene One Entertainment =

American movie theater chain

Scene One Entertainment, LLC
- Type: Private
- Industry: Entertainment (movie theaters)
- Founded: 1900, New York City
- Founder: B.S. Moss
- Headquarters: Schenectady, New York
- Number of locations: 7 (as of October 2026)
- Areas served: Colorado, New York, and Connecticut
- Key people: Joseph Masher (CEO)
- Website: www.btmcinemas.com

Scene One Entertainment, LLC, formerly known as Bow Tie Management, is an American movie theater chain. Based in Schenectady, New York, the company operates seven theaters, with five theaters in New York and one each in Colorado and Connecticut, under the BTM Cinemas (formerly Bow Tie Cinemas) and Scene One Cinemas banners, although the former is only used for the Colorado location.

The company has been family-owned for four generations. The company was established by Benjamin S. Moss (1878–1951) who opened nickelodeon venues, then shifted to Vaudeville venues, before settling on movie theaters. It is the oldest surviving movie exhibition company in the United States, having been founded in 1900.

As of 2013, Bow Tie Cinemas was formerly the eighth-largest movie theater chain in the United States, operating 63 multiplexes across the East Coast. Since then, many former Bow Tie Cinemas locations have been sold to AMC or other competitors. In 2023, the company re-located to Schenectady, New York, rebranded as Scene One Entertainment, and began to expand into other fields of entertainment by acquiring the Huck Finn's Playland amusement park.

== History ==
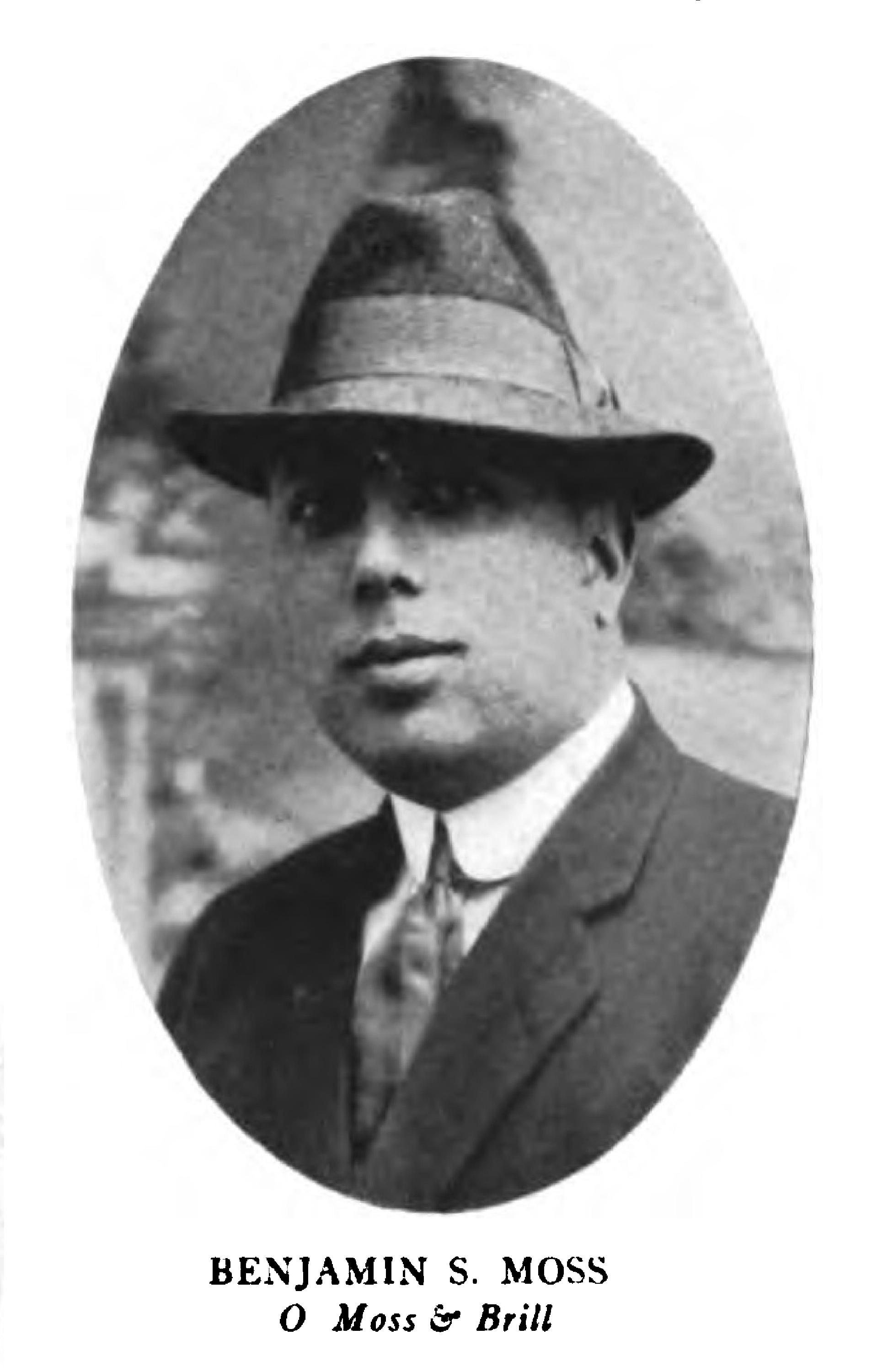

Benjamin S. Moss immigrated to the U.S. from Austria in 1900. He opened venues for nickelodeons. He soon changed to operating venues for the Vaudeville circuit and also established a film production company. The film production company produced Margaret Sanger's film Birth Control which was banned from release in New York in 1915. B. S. Moss Motion Picture Company presented Three Weeks (1914) and produced One Day (1916), Boots and Saddles (1916), The Power of Evil (1916), and The Salamander (191c6).

B. S. Moss Enterprises operated several movie theaters. In 1910, Moss organized the syndicate that built the $100,000 Washington Theatre at Amsterdam Avenue and 149th Street, known as the first "real" movie palace in New York City. Moss' Vaudeville theaters included Manhattan's Colony Theater, notable for being the venue of several high-profile Disney premieres including Fantasia and Steamboat Willie, the third Disney cartoon to feature Mickey Mouse, but the first to be released.

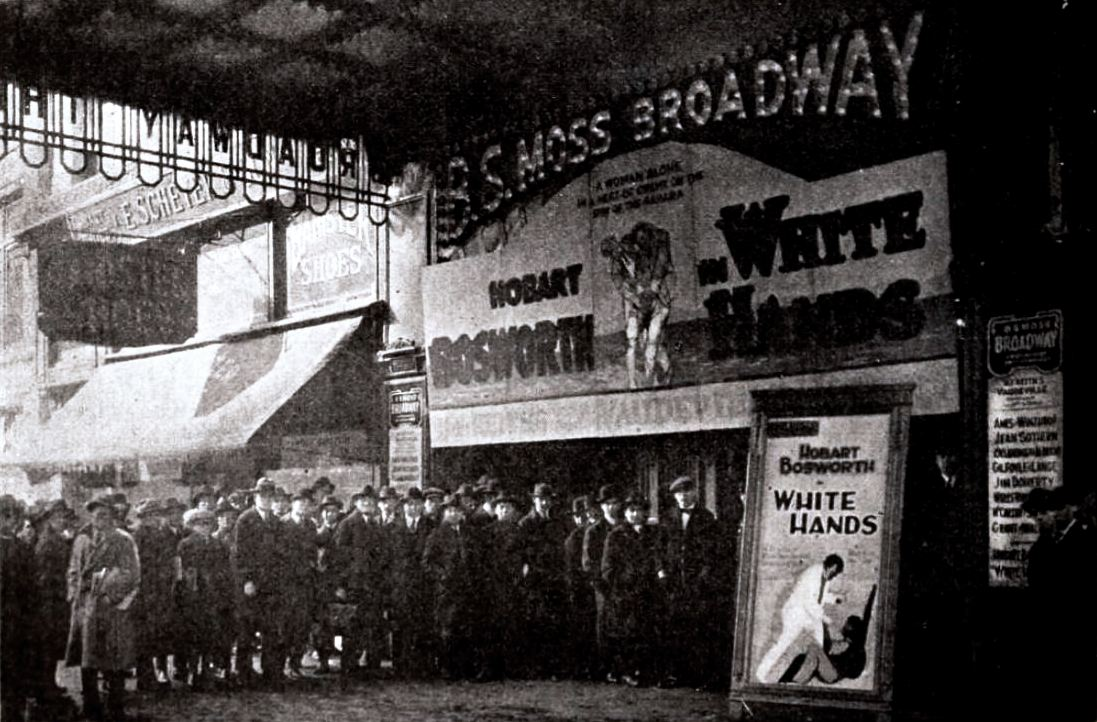
The B. S. Moss Broadway Theater showing White Hands in 1922

In the 1930s, Moss decided to focus more on the movie business and phased out his vaudeville program. In 1936, he opened his Criterion Theater in Times Square, which lasted as a successful movie theater until 2000. Since then, Bow Tie Cinemas has continued to concentrate on the presentation of films.

=== Bow Tie Cinemas ===
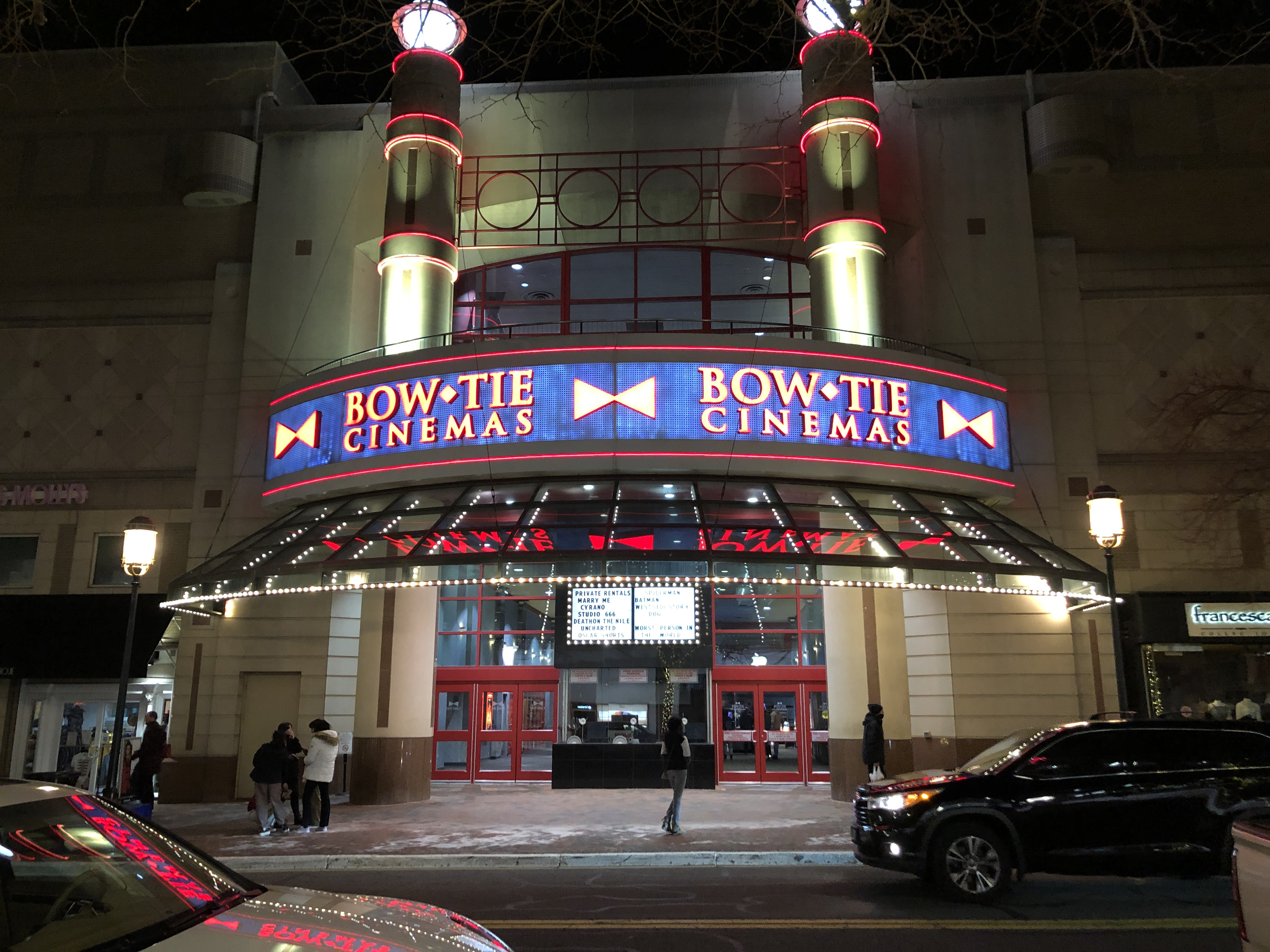
Bow Tie Cinemas in Reston Town Center, Reston, Virginia

The company changed its name to Bow Tie Cinemas in 2004, upon opening its Criterion Cinemas complex in Downtown New Haven, Connecticut. The name honors the company's flagship property, located where Broadway and 45th meet in Manhattan, known as the "Bow Tie" of Times Square.

In 2013, Bow Tie Cinemas acquired 41 theatres from Clearview Cinemas, a movie theater chain within the New York metropolitan area founded in 1994. From 1998 to 2013, Clearview was a subsidiary of Cablevision. Ownership of Clearview's 42nd location, the Ziegfeld Theatre in New York City, was retained by Cablevision, but Bow Tie assumed operations of the theater until it closed in 2016.

In 2017, the company introduced a premium cinema concept known as "Bow Tie Cinemas Ultimate", which feature reserved recliner seating, expanded food and bar offerings, and in-seat food service.

In 2021, Bow Tie Cinemas closed its Wilton Mall location in Saratoga Springs, New York amid the COVID-19 pandemic. In 2022, seven Bow Tie theaters in Connecticut, upstate New York, and Annapolis, Maryland, were sold to AMC Entertainment.

On September 30, 2023, Bow Tie announced their Criterion Cinemas location in New Haven would close on October 12, 2023. It was the last Bow Tie Cinemas left in Connecticut.

=== Scene One Entertainment ===
In November 2023, Bow Tie Cinemas' parent company Bow Tie Management announced that it would be rebranding as Scene One Entertainment, relocating its headquarters from Connecticut to Schenectady, New York, and retiring the Bow Tie Cinemas brand by rebranding its remaining theaters under either the BTM Cinemas ("Big Time Movies") or Scene One Cinemas banners. Concurrently, Scene One Entertainment announced an intent to expand into other fields of entertainment such as live event venues, and its acquisition of the Huck Finn's Playland amusement park in Albany (Scene One's CEO Joseph Masher had a childhood nostalgia for its prior incarnation, Hoffman's Playland, while growing up in Brunswick, New York) to expand beyond its core cinema business.

In January 2024, it was announced that the last Bow Tie Cinemas location in New Jersey, the Warner Theater, would be permanently closing after 92 years in operation. Their last day of operation was on January 28, 2024. Bow Tie is considering options for possible redevelopment of the space. The same month, Scene One announced that it would reopen its previously-shuttered Wilton Mall location under the Scene One banner, having renovated it with new concessions, amenities, and "The Big Scene" premium large format (PLF) auditoriums.

In March 2024, Scene One announced that it would acquire and reopen the Spectrum 8 in Albany, which had been shuttered by Landmark Theatres. In January 2025, Scene One acquired Gilford Cinemas 8 in Gilford, New Hampshire from Your Neighborhood Theatres, marking its first location in the state. However, after October 8, 2026, the landlords of Gilford Airport Plaza—the strip mall where the theater is located—terminated Scene One's lease for failing to meet its contractual obligations, forcing its immediate closure. The landlords emphasized that the lease termination had nothing to do with the theater's performance, and that the theater would reopen under new operators; it reopened under independent ownership by early November. Around the same time, Scene One's sole Virginia location, Movieland at Boulevard Square in Richmond, Virginia, was also removed from Scene One's website, implying Scene One's end of ownership for that location.
