= Birth control (disambiguation) =

Birth control is a means of preventing pregnancy.

Birth control may also refer to:

- Combined oral contraceptive pill, the oldest and most popular form of hormonal birth control
- Birth Control (band), a German rock band
- Birth Control (film)
