= Clearview Cinemas =

Defunct theater chain in the U.S.

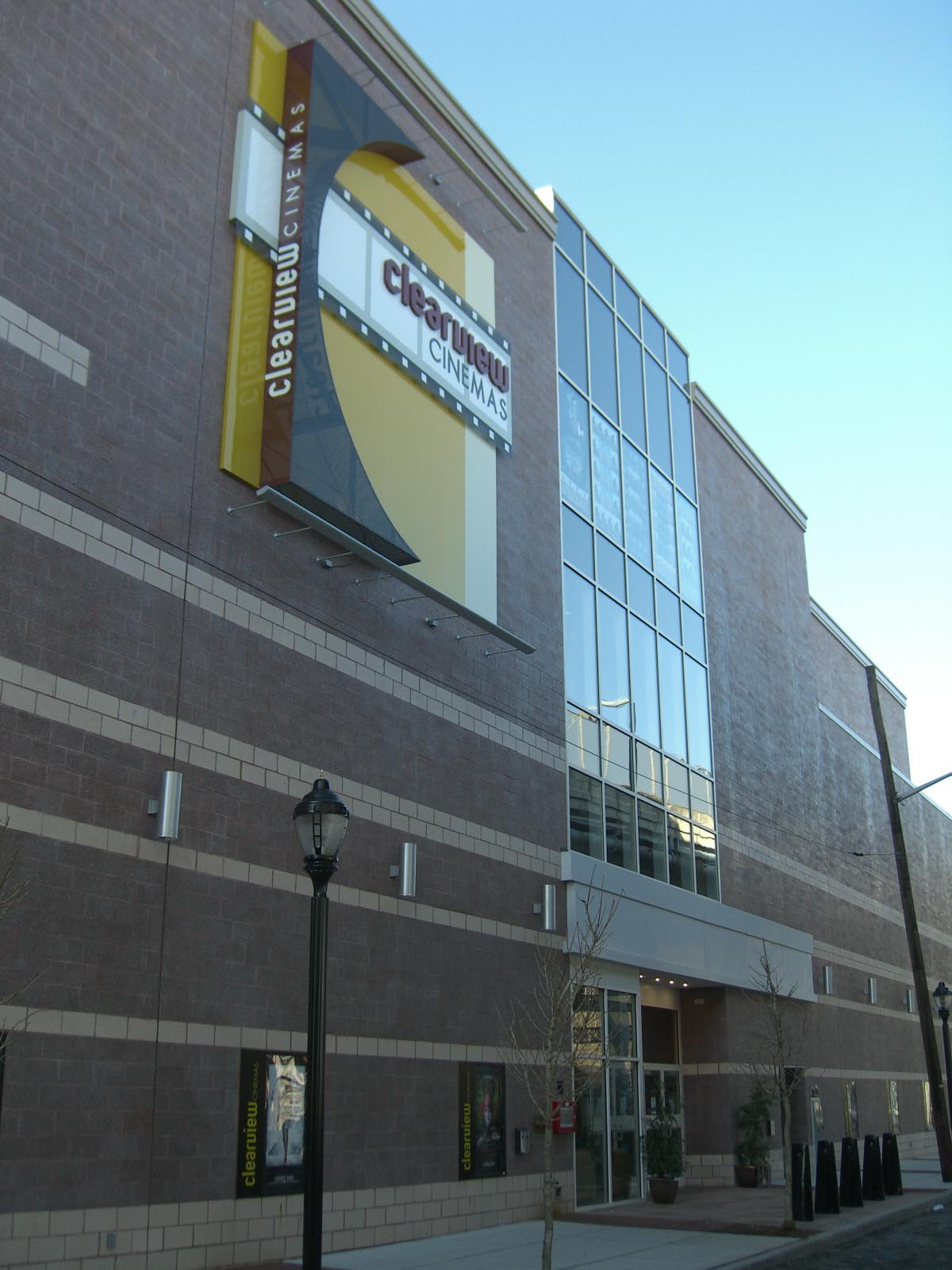
- The Clearview Cinema in Hoboken, New Jersey
- Industry: Cinemas
- Founded: 1994
- Defunct: 2013
- Fate: Acquired by Bow Tie Cinemas
- Headquarters: Florham Park, New Jersey, United States

Clearview Cinemas was a chain of movie theatres within the New York metropolitan area. A subsidiary of Cablevision from 1998 to 2013, Clearview Cinemas was formed in 1994 through a group led by Bud Mayo and was listed as a public company on the American Stock Exchange on August 19, 1997. It was acquired by Bow Tie Cinemas in April 2013.

== Acquisition by Bow Tie Cinemas ==
Forty-one of the Clearview Cinema locations were purchased by Ridgefield, Connecticut-based Bow Tie Cinemas. The acquisition was announced on April 29, 2013, and made Bow Tie the largest exhibitor in the metropolitan New York area and the eighth-largest chain in the nation.

Bow Tie also managed the Ziegfeld Theatre in New York, although Cablevision retained ownership. The Chelsea Cinemas in New York City became Bow Tie's Manhattan flagship venue, and continued to host events, including the Tribeca Film Festival.
