= Big Surf =

Defunct waterpark in Tempe, Arizona

- Interactive map of Big Surf
- Location: Tempe, Arizona, United States
- Coordinates: 33.4457°N 111.9126°W
- Opened: 1969
- Closed: 2019

Big Surf was a waterpark located in Tempe, Arizona. Opened in 1969 and financed by the Clairol Company, it boasted the first wave pool in the United States. The wave pool was designed by Phil Dexter. At a ceremony on August 17, 2013 the Waikiki Beach Wave pool was designated as an ASME Historic Mechanical Engineering Landmark. The recognition is for being the "first inland surfing facility in North America". The Big Surf Water park became the first amusement park or waterpark to receive such an ASME landmark status.

== History ==
As one of the claimants of the first and oldest wave pool in the United States, it at one point featured surfing exhibitions and competitions, as well as regular use by patrons of the park. This was largely discontinued in the late 1980s and early 1990s due to safety and liability concerns. Daily surf sessions are held before the park opens to the general public and between 5pm-6pm. Since its opening, Big Surf has added several attractions and replaced its original sand beach with a concrete bottom.

The park celebrated their 40th year anniversary in 2009. However, on September 2, 2009, it was reported that Big Surf will close indefinitely at the end of the day on Monday, September 7, 2009. Later that week on September 5, the Arizona Republic reported that Big Surf would open again in Summer 2010 under the Inland Oceans LLC rather than the Golfland Entertainment, Inc. banner.

Big Surf closed for the season in 2019, but did not reopen for the 2020 season due to the Covid-19 pandemic. The 2020 season had Big Surf's parking lot turned into a temporary drive in movie theater, and after staying closed in 2021, assets from the park, including the rental boogie boards, were auctioned off in the winter of 2022, indicating that the park would not reopen again.

== Additional attractions ==
Pink Floyd performed here in 1972 as part of their Dark Side of the Moon Tour.

A popular teen disco known as The Rock Hop operated at Big Surf on Friday nights between 1977 and 1980.

Waterslides were added to the park in 1979.
