= Huck Finn's Playland =

Amusement park in Albany, New York, U.S.

Huck Finn’s Playland
- Interactive map of Huck Finn’s Playland
- Location: 25 Erie Blvd., Albany, New York, United States
- Coordinates: 42.663752°N 73.738568°W
- Status: Operating
- Opened: 2015; 11 years ago
- Operating season: May–October

Attractions
- Total: 16
- Roller coasters: 1
- Water rides: 0
- Website: www.hucksplayland.com

Huck Finn's Playland is an amusement park located in Albany, New York. It opened in 2015 and features the rides of the former Hoffman's Playland.

== History ==
In 2014, David and Ruth Hoffman, owners of Hoffman's Playland in Latham, announced that the park would close in September. The Hoffmans had searched for a new owner for the amusement rides to no avail, and the rides were scheduled to go to auction. Shortly after the park closed, the Sperber family—owners of the Albany-based furniture store Huck Finn's Warehouse—announced their intent to purchase the rides and build a new park next to the store. The park was constructed on a vacant 3 acre lot, and opened in June 2015. The new park features the Hoffman's Playland rides, a new concession building, and an arcade relocated inside the warehouse. The Lusse Auto Skooter bumper cars were purchased but were not rebuilt at the new park. They were sold to Knoebels Amusement Resort in 2017, where they now operate.

The location itself is allegedly haunted. Some ghost stories stem to the park's location in Latham, with claims that there are spirits attached to the paratrooper ride and food trailer. There are other stories dating back to the new location's association with the Warehouse District of Albany. There was much railroad and canal activity along Erie Boulevard, and the first perforated toilet paper was invented in the Huck Finn's building (then the Albany Perforated Wrapping Paper Company, photos here) by Seth Wheeler. There are rumored to be burial sites from the canal era between the back of the park and the highway. These rumors are unconfirmed, as the alleged burial sites are located in protected wetlands. There are numerous stories about a black robed figure that wanders through the Playland at night protecting the park.

In 2021, the Huck Finn's Warehouse building was sold to Redburn Development, and redeveloped as a mixed-use building featuring apartments and retail, including a Huck Finn Home store. In November 2023, it was announced that Scene One Entertainment (which owns a cinema in Schenectady, and announced plans to relocate its headquarters to the city) would acquire Huck Finn's Playland from the Sperbers. Scene One's CEO Joseph Masher cited his childhood nostalgia of visiting Hoffman's Playland while growing up in Brunswick, and suggested the possibility of synergies with his theater business and other new ventures. He stated that the park would not be relocated, and that he hoped to expand it with new attractions.

== Rides ==
Ride	Year opened	Year Manufactured	Manufacturer	Notes
Huck Finn's Playland Railroad	2015	1952	Miniature Train Company/Allan Herschell Company	The original train was manufactured by the Miniature Train Company and operated until 1979. For the 1980 season, it was replaced by a restored S-24 Iron Horse. A few years later, a second S-24 Iron Horse was restored and put into operation for a total of 2 engines and 6 cars. The engines were manufactured in 1965 and 1967.
Merry-Go-Round	2015	1952	Allan Herschell Company	Merry-go-round with 3-abreast horses and 2 chariots.
Boats	2015	1953	Allan Herschell Company	Circular wet boat ride.
Little Wheel	2015	1959	Eli Bridge Company	Miniature Eli Bridge ferris wheel.
Umbrella Ride	2015	1965	Hampton	Circular car ride.
Caterpillar	2015	1955	Allan Herschell Company	Circular revolving Caterpillar ride.
Teacups	2015	1976	Hampton	Hampton umbrella car ride.
Helicopters	2015	1958	Allan Herschell Company	Circular helicopter ride with individual bars to control height of Helicopter.
The Fun Slide	2018	1962		Classic Fun Slide ride.
Scrambler	2015	1965	Eli Bridge Company	Classic Eli Bridge scrambler ride.
Paratrooper	2015	1974	Hrubetz	Fast spinning and elevating Paratrooper ride.
Tilt-a-Whirl	2015	1974	Sellner Manufacturing	Classic Tilt-a-Whirl ride.
Roller Coaster	2015	1960	Allan Herschell Company	Little Dipper Herschell roller coaster.
Big Wheel	2015	1971	Eli Bridge Company	50 foot Eli ferris wheel.
4x4 Trucks	2015	1989	Wisdom Rides	Individual cars that ran along a tracked route.
Sky Fighter Jets	2015	1956	Allan Herschell Company	Aerial jet ride with shooting guns.
Octopus	2022	Unknown	Eyerly Aircraft Company	Classic Eyerly Octopus ride.

== Retired Rides ==
Ride	Year Manufactured	Year opened	Year closed	Manufacturer	Notes
Balloon Flight	1980	2015	2021	Bradley & Kaye	Balloon Flight was removed in 2021 after reaching the end of its service life. The ride originally opened at Hoffman's Playland in 2000. Manufactured in 1980, it was relocated from an unknown park.
Red Baron	1985	2015	2023	Bradley & Kaye	Red Baron was manufactured in 1985, and was relocated from the Catskill Game Farm to Hoffman's Playland in 2007. It was removed after the 2023 season after reaching the end of its service life.

== Gallery ==
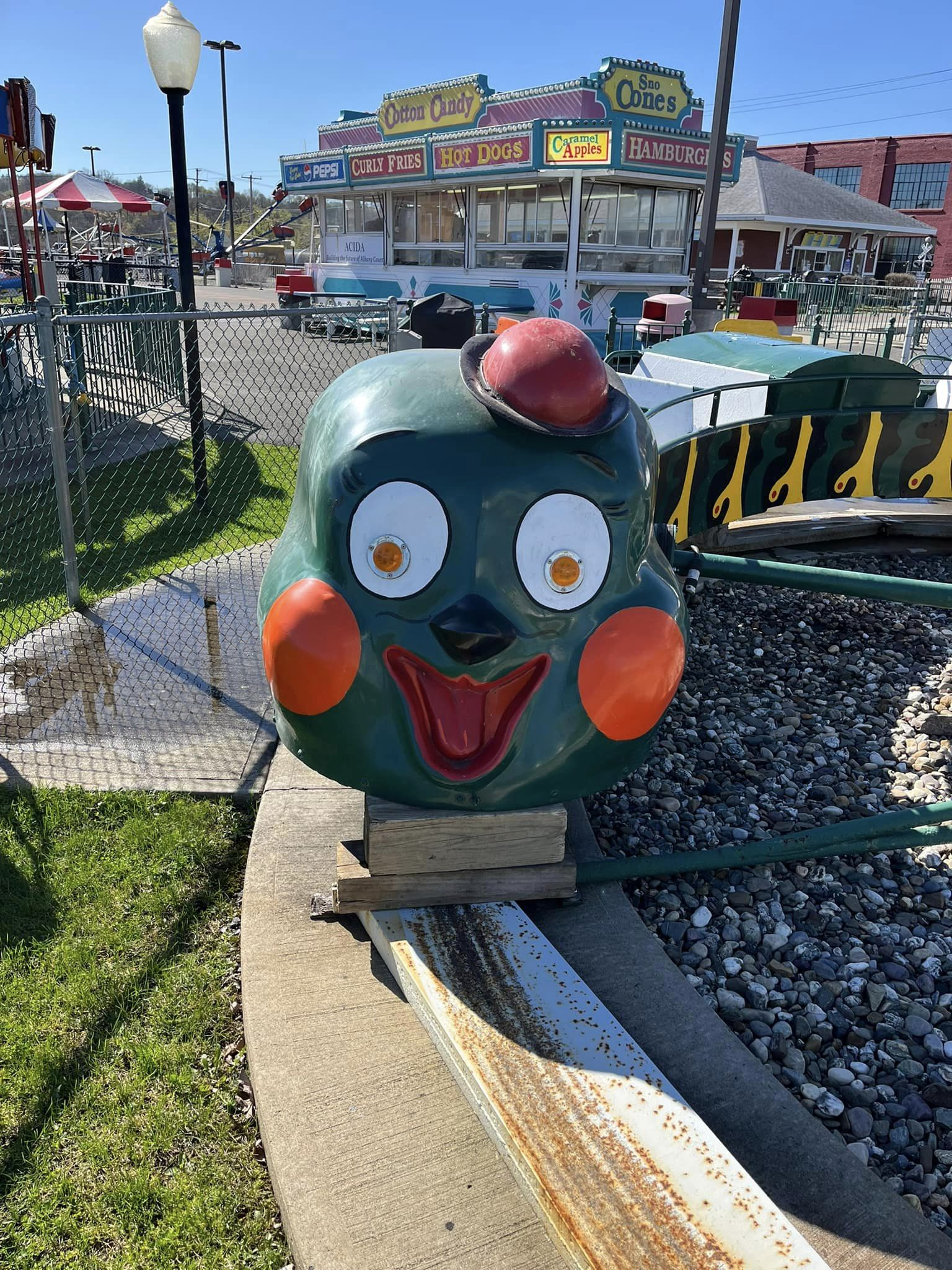
The Caterpillar ride

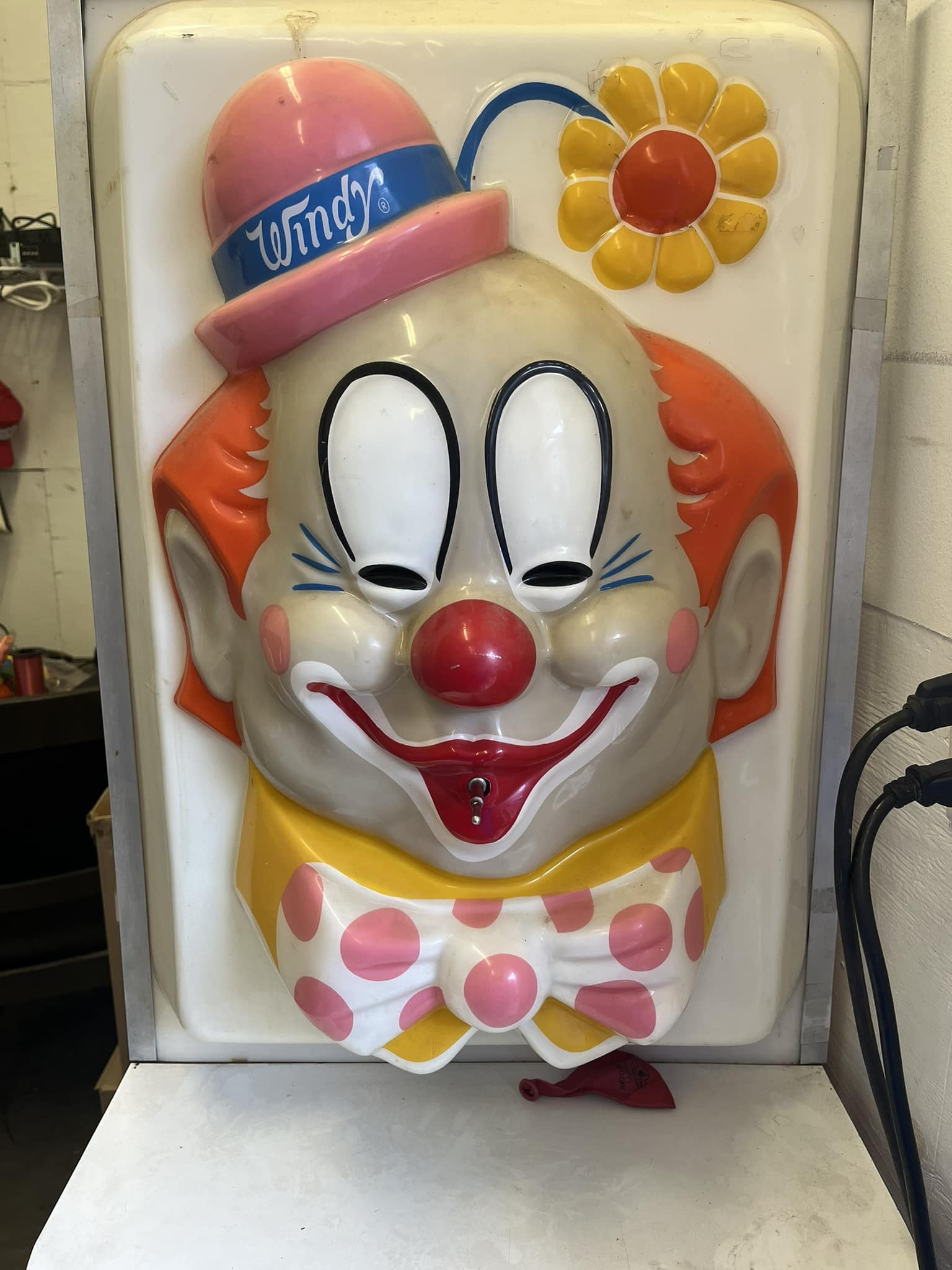
Windy, the balloon machine from Hoffman's Playland's arcade building, is operational in 2024 for the first time since the park relocated to Albany.

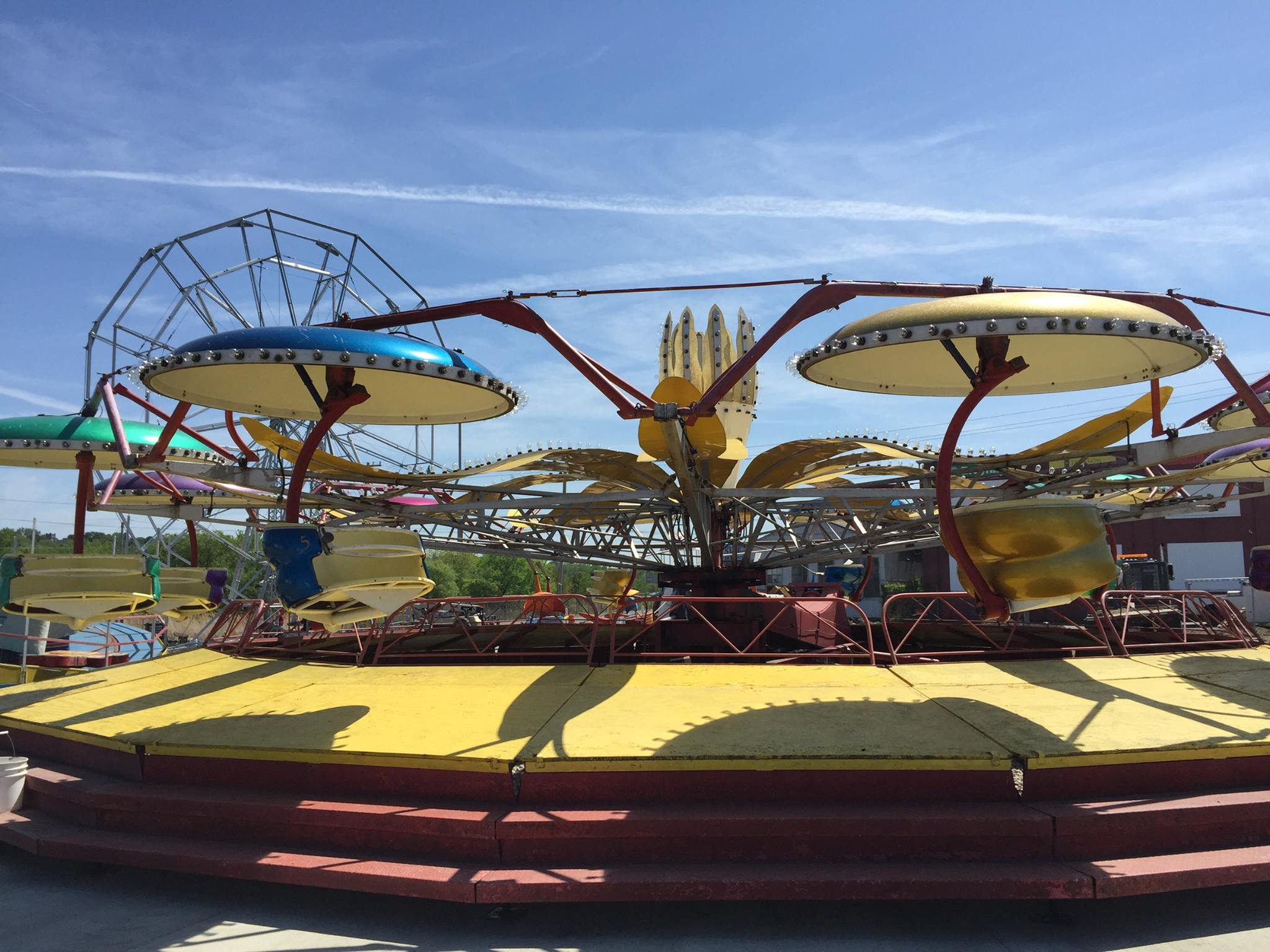
The Paratrooper ride

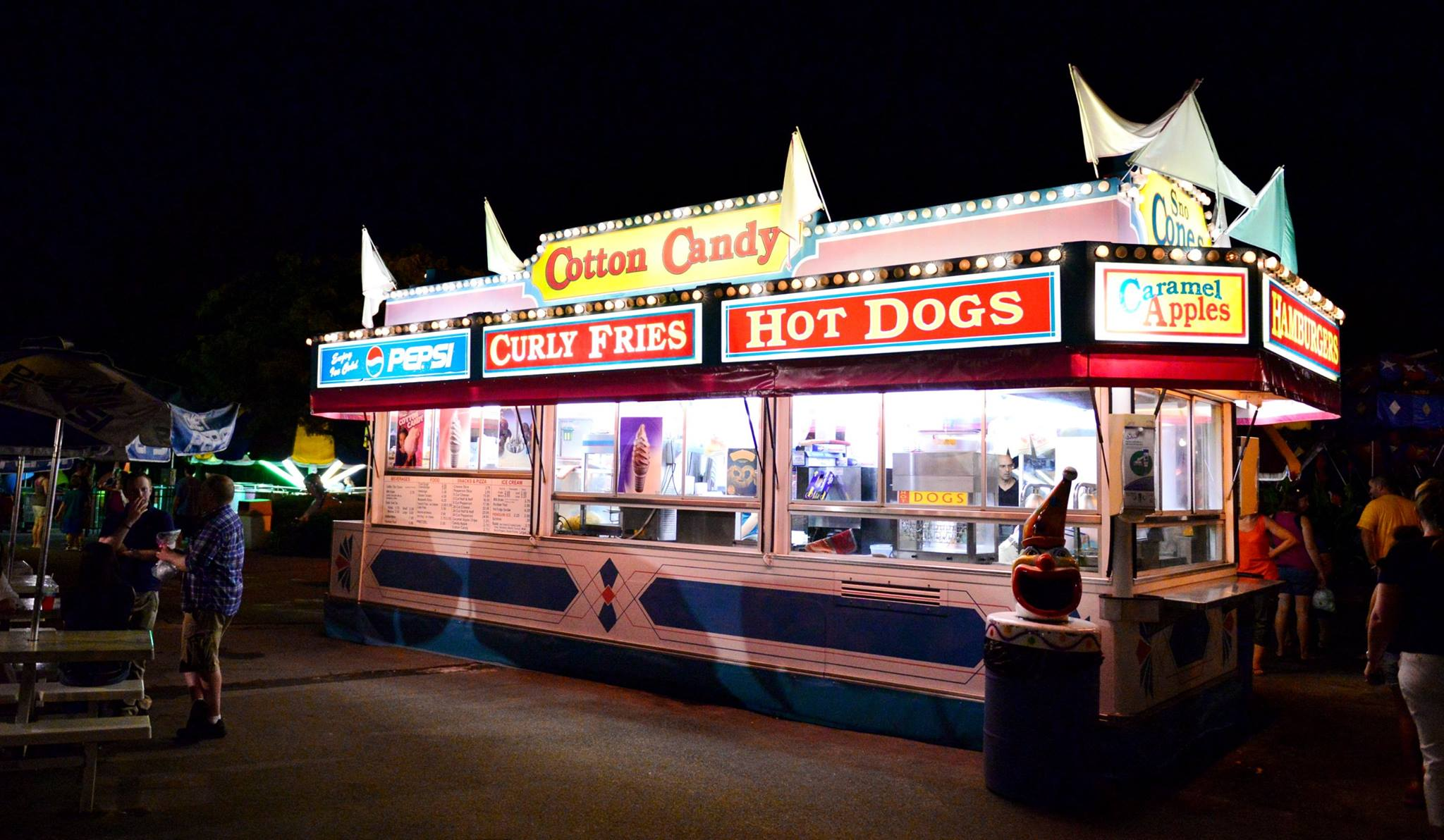
The concession trailer

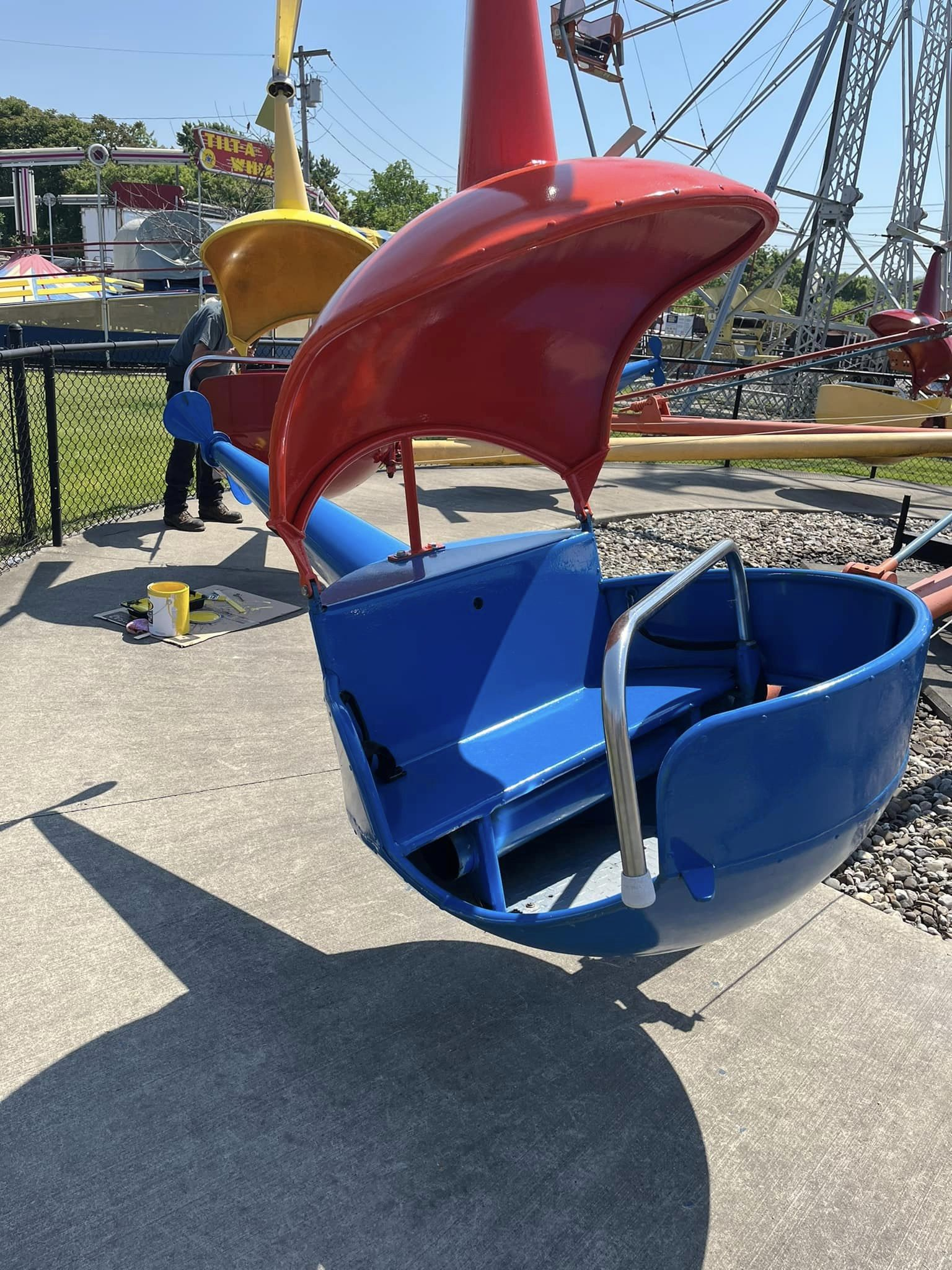
Huck Finn's Playland's helicopter ride, restored for the 2024 season with new paint and propellers.

== See also ==
- Hoffman's Playland
- List of amusement parks in the Americas
