= Grand Texas Sports and Entertainment District =

Proposed entertainment complex in Houston, Texas

Coordinates: 30.196°N 95.196°W

The Grand Texas Sports and Entertainment District is a privately funded entertainment complex scheduled to open near Houston, Texas, in the United States, in the 2020s.

The district will consist of eight venues: the Grand Texas Theme Park, Big Rivers Water Park, a retail center called Grove Factory Outlet, Downtown Texas, Speedsportz Racing Park, Grand Texas Sportsplex, Gator Bayou Adventure Park, and Grand Texas RV Resort.

== Background and history ==
Leaders of the Grand Texas project hoped the district and park would fill a void left by Six Flags AstroWorld's closure in 2005.

Original plans focused on the amusement and water parks, but in November 2013 project leaders announced an expanded entertainment district called the Grand Texas Sports and Entertainment District. Land for the district was closed on during the summer of 2013. The first phase of construction, scheduled to begin in early 2014, was to include clearing land and building infrastructure. Big Rivers Water Park was scheduled to open in April 2015. Grand Texas Theme Park was scheduled to open in December 2015. However, plans for the opening were delayed to 2023.

The site of Grand Texas was cleared out in 2015 to begin construction. Construction on the RV Resort began in 2015 and was finished on August 6, 2016, while construction on Speedsportz finished in winter 2016. Construction on Big Rivers was expected to begin in August 2017 and finish in spring 2018 while Grand Texas Sportsplex was expected to be finished in winter 2018. When the construction of Big Rivers is in operation, construction on the Grand Texas Theme Park will begin.

== Attractions ==
=== Parks ===
- Grand Texas Theme Park, an amusement park featuring five roller coasters, dozens of rides, and emphasis on live entertainment
- Big Rivers Water Park will cover forty acres and feature a "natural, picturesque setting". Groundbreaking was scheduled for December 14, 2017. The water park broke ground on December 14, 2017 The park is projected to open in May 2018.
- Gator Bayou Adventure Park will feature outdoor activities such as fishing and paddling on the pond, and extreme actives like free-falling from 100 feet. The park will also feature live alligators. Construction is expected to begin in 2017 with an opening date of 2018.
- Speedsportz Racing, a high-speed, European style outdoor track designed by Alan Rudolph. Attractions will include a half-mile concession rental track and facility, a separate .8-mile performance track and facility, and paved skid pads and paddocks. The park will also include four buildings for concessions and meeting spaces, rental garages, stacked go-karts storage building, second floor viewing decks, and outdoor canopies to keep customers and racers out of the sun. The racing park opened in December 2016.
- The Grand Texas Sportsplex, a sports field located on the north side of the entertainment district, will feature 90 acres of baseball and softball fields and 10 multi-use fields for soccer, lacrosse, rugby, and 7-on-7 football. The sportsplex will be able to accommodate up to 200 teams at once. The sportsplex is expected to open in winter 2018.

=== Shopping and dining ===
- Downtown Texas is a mall that will feature a 450,000 square foot retail center with "dynamic entertainment", restaurants and shopping. Construction is expected to begin in 2019.
- Grove Factory Outlet is an outlet mall which will feature retail stores, department stores, and dining experiences for shoppers. It is planned to open in April 2019.

=== Hotels ===
- Grand Texas RV Resort is a resort parallel to the dining and shopping area. It has 144 sites for RVs, and has water, sewers, and amp hook-ups. The RV Resort has free Wi-Fi, cable TV, garbage pick-up, and free coffee and ice. The resort officially opened for check-ins on August 13, 2016.
- Four hotels are currently planned to be on site upon completion of Grand Texas including a Best Western Premier due to open in 2019.
