= Mulligan Family Fun Center =

Amusement park in Murrieta, California

- Interactive map of Mulligan Family Fun Center
- Location: Murrieta, California, United States
- Coordinates: 33°33′34.46″N 117°12′5.57″W
- Status: Operating
- Opened: 1991 (Torrance location); 1996 (Murrieta location); 2005 (Palmdale location)
- Closed: 2020 (Torrance location); 2021 (Palmdale location)

Attractions
- Total: 5
- Water rides: 1
- Website: mulliganfun.com

The Mulligan Family Fun Center, colloquially referred to as Mulligan's, is a family entertainment center and amusement park in Murrieta, Riverside County, originally specializing in miniature golf. Before 2021, it operated two other locations in Southern California, at Torrance and Palmdale.

Mulligan was founded by Georgia Claessens, daughter of South Bay real estate developer Walter Storm, in 1991. Built in Torrance, California, the initial property was repurposed from a private Storm family tract, used to store recreational vehicles, into a driving range. The site expanded around the driving range, which operated until 2007, adding two miniature golf courses, an arcade, a batting cage, and an indoor restaurant. Proving successful in coming years, the business grew further through the 1990s and 2000s, adding more attractions, such as kart racing and laser tag. Two Mulligan locations were established elsewhere in the region: Murrieta in 1996 and Palmdale in 2005.

Claessens died in 2016 at the age of 60, following a fatal horse riding accident. After her death, a series of closures occurred: the original Torrance location closed its doors in February 2020 and burnt down the next year while the location in Palmdale closed in July 2021 due to the COVID-19 pandemic. Currently, the Murrieta location stands as the sole remaining location.
