= Los Aleros =

Theme park in Venezuela

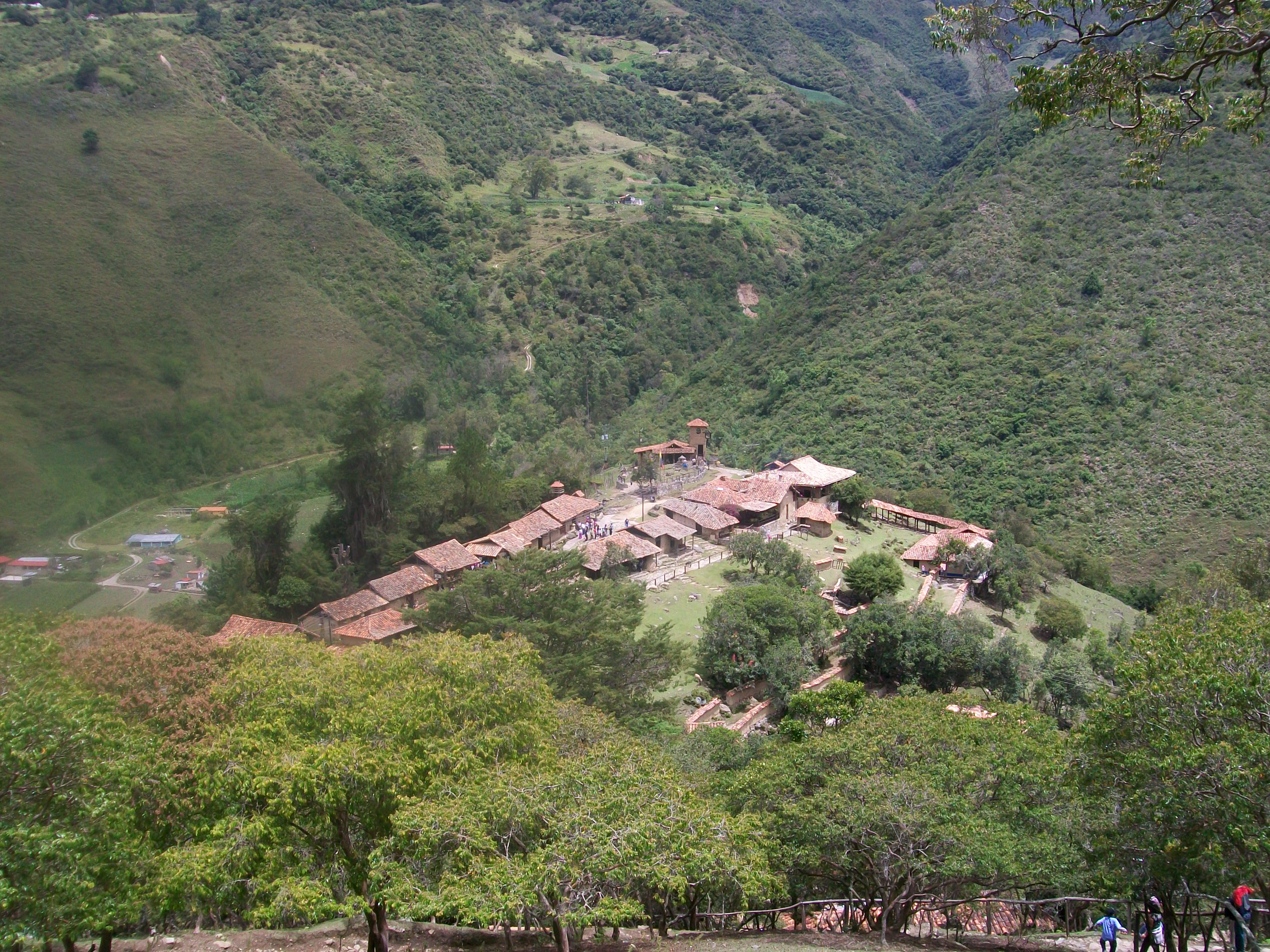
- Interactive map of Los Aleros
- Location: Mérida, Venezuela
- Coordinates: 8.6664°N 71.0264°W
- Status: Operating
- Opened: 1984
- Website: http://www.losaleros.net/

Los Aleros is a theme park located near Mérida, Venezuela. It depicts a typical Andean town in the 1930s. It was created by Alexis Montilla in 1984; he subsequently created the nearby "Venezuela de Antier" and "Montaña de los Sueños" themeparks.
