= Birth Control (film) =

1917 film

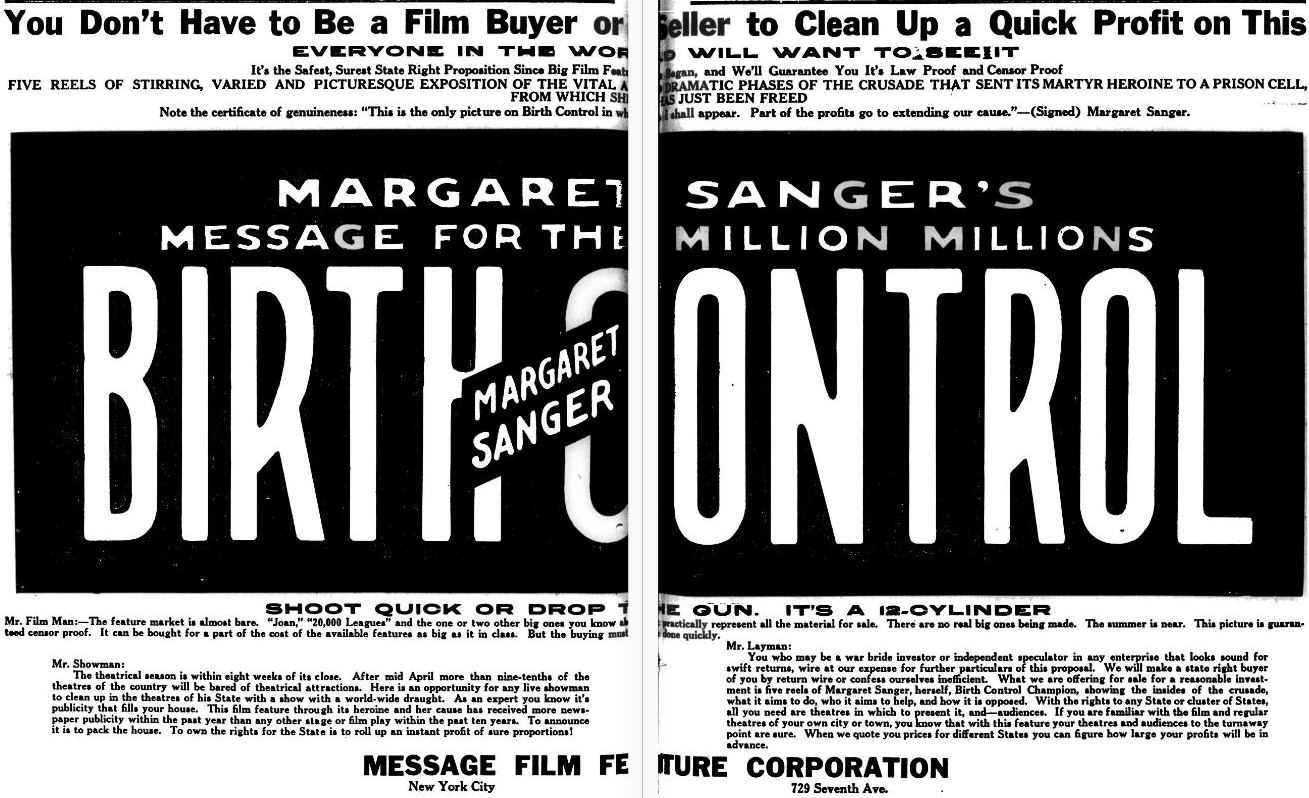
- Two page advertisement in the 30 March 1917 Variety
- Written by: Margaret Sanger
- Produced by: Margaret Sanger
- Starring: Margaret Sanger
- Production company: B.S. Moss Motion Picture Corporation
- Distributed by: Message Photo-Play Co.
- Release date: April 1917
- Running time: 5 reels
- Language: Silent (English intertitles)

Birth Control (also known as The New World) is a lost 1917 American documentary film produced by and starring Margaret Sanger and describing her family planning work. It was the first film banned under the 1915 ruling of the United States Supreme Court in Mutual Film Corporation v. Industrial Commission of Ohio, which held that the exhibition of films did not constitute free speech.

The banning of Birth Control was upheld by the New York Court of Appeals on the grounds that a film on family planning may be censored "in the interest of morality, decency, and public safety and welfare."

== See also ==
- Film censorship in the United States
- List of lost films
