= Vulqano Park =

Amusement park in Quito, Ecuador

- Interactive map of Vulqano Park
- Location: Quito, Ecuador
- Coordinates: 0.191874°S 78.518188°W
- Opened: 2005
- Closed: 2020
- Owner: Mirkpas

Vulqano Park is an amusement park in Quito, Ecuador. The park is part of a much larger entertainment complex named the TelefériQo.

The park closed in May 2020 due to economic losses resulting from the COVID-19 pandemic, but on August 30, 2021, announced its reopening on its Facebook page.

== Description ==
The park contains 24 attractions and two roller coasters. Attractions have various fees, and the park sells daily passes that include all mechanical rides.
