= Ocean Beach (New London) =

Beach in New London, Connecticut

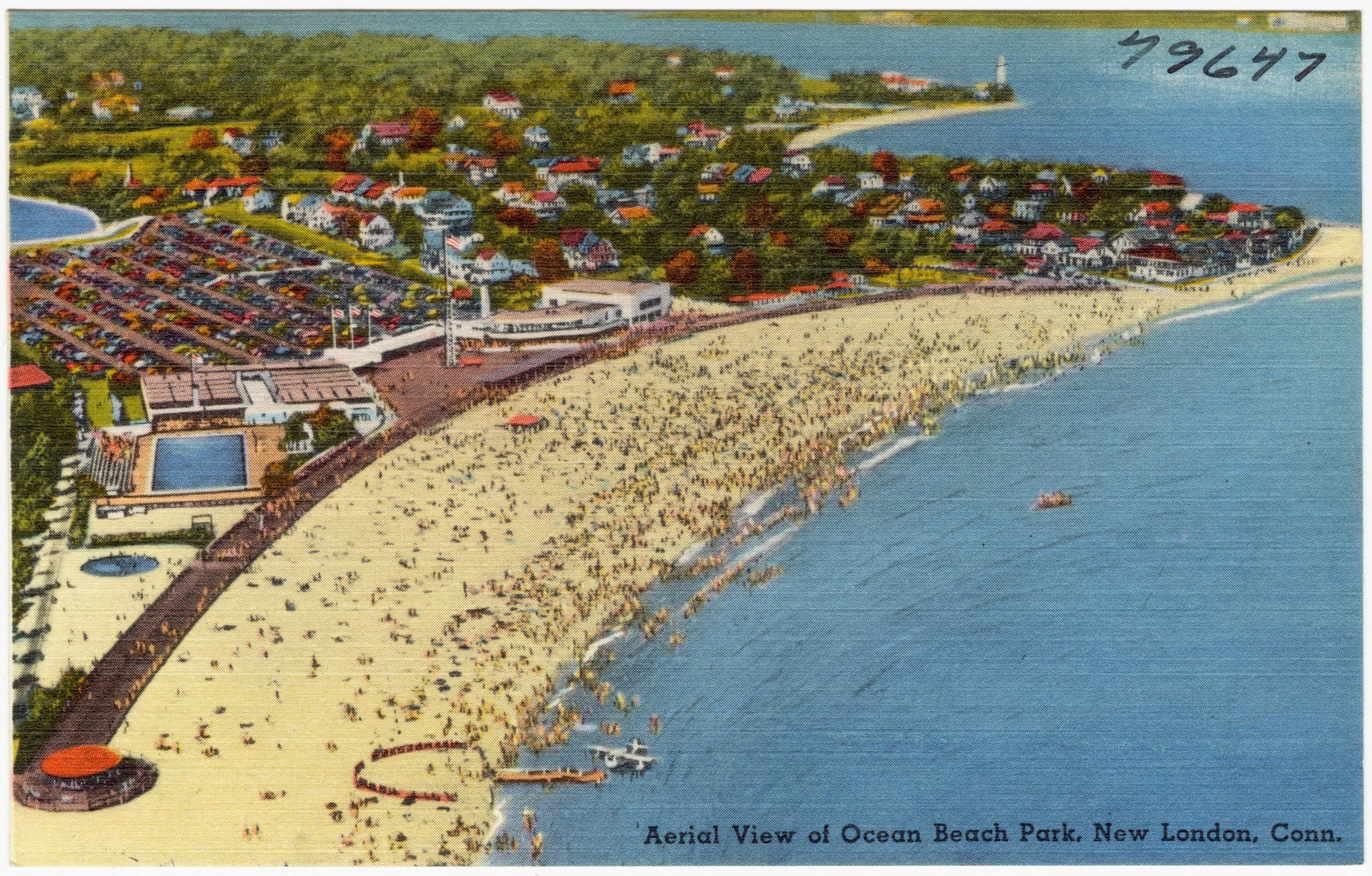
- Ocean Beach Park Postcard

- Location within Connecticut
- Location: New London, Connecticut
- Coordinates: 41°18′18″N 72°05′59″W
- Area: 41 acres (17 ha)
- Established: 1941
- Administrator: New London, Connecticut and Sodexo
- Website: Ocean Beach Park

Ocean Beach Park is a large beach located on the southern shore of New London, Connecticut. It overlooks the southernmost end of the Thames River as well as the Long Island Sound, and the islands of Fisher's Island and Long Island can be seen from the beach. Ocean Beach Park contains within its boundaries a large sugar-sand beach, boardwalk, mini golf, kiddie rides, waterslides, olympic-size swimming pool, cafeteria, ice cream stand, nature trail, banquet halls, arcade, and often has live music performances during the summer season, specifically on its center boardwalk stage. Firework displays happen often during the summer, typically accompanied by a live tribute band.

== History ==
Ocean Beach Park was founded in 1940 by the New London City Council in the aftermath of the 1938 New England Hurricane. After the hurricane left the Ocean Beach property devastated by intrusive sands and ruined homes, the City Council determined that the best use of the property would be to use it as a public beach park. After many years of operation, the beach eventually found itself a highly visited beach and park, with roughly 500,000 visitors annually. Much of the draw of Ocean Beach comes down to its large beachfront and calmer waters, which are safe for children to swim in and visit.

In recent years, the beach has been operated by companies contracted by the City of New London, firstly the Boston Culinary Group, then Centerplate, and finally Sodexo-Centerplate. These companies have handled the renovations and daily operations at Ocean Beach since the early 2000s. Since these companies have been in charge of the park, several major renovations have occurred, including a major overhaul of the park's three banquet rooms, named The Port 'n Starboard, The Nautilus (named after the USS Nautilus, of which there is a large painting inside), and The Pilot House. In addition to the banquet halls, the park has also had an entirely new Boardwalk laid down during 2009. This is the third boardwalk to exist on location at Ocean Beach.

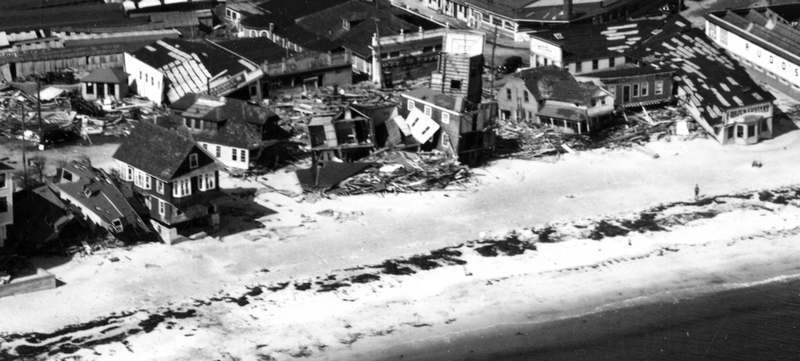
Ocean Beach Hurricane Damage, 1938

The park sustained heavy damages twice in its history from two major hurricanes to impact the area - firstly the Hurricane of 1938, and secondly Hurricane Sandy. These two storms caused massive amounts of damage specifically to the creek area of the park, in which sand from the winds of the storm filled the bottom of the nearby Alewife Cove.

One of the most known structures to ever be present at Ocean Beach was the Clocktower. The Clocktower stood at the center of the Boardwalk from the park's creation until the early 1990s, when it was destroyed by a crane attempting to dismantle it for refurbishment. There has been a recent effort to restore the historic clocktower, and the New London City Council voted in 2018 to accept donations regarding the reconstruction of the clocktower at Ocean Beach. As of the summer of 2020, no progress has been made on the actual construction of any such structure.

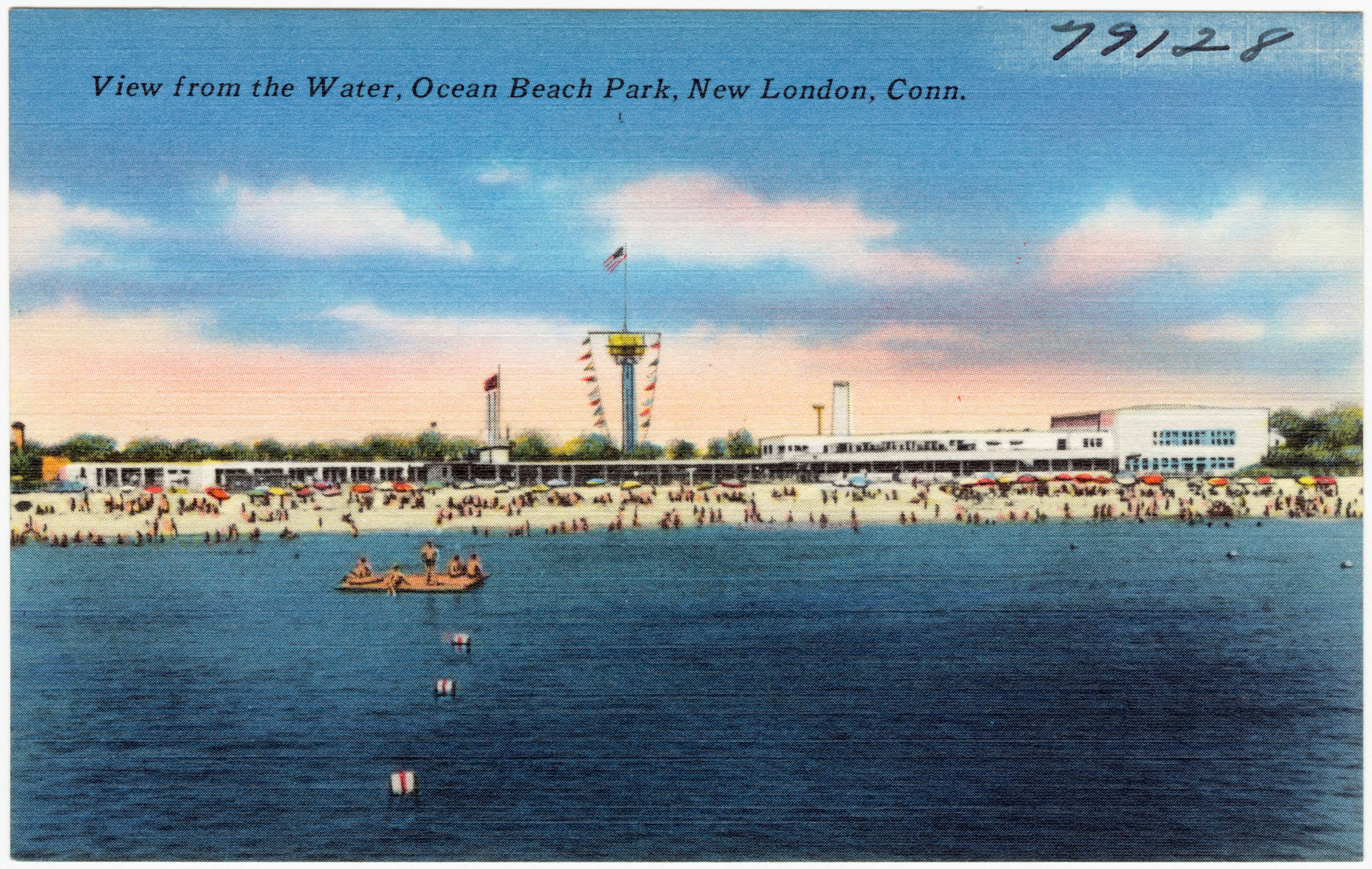
View of Ocean Beach Park from the water. The clocktower can be seen at center.

Despite the park's increasing popularity, there has always been a push to redevelop and remove Ocean Beach and utilize the valuable real-estate for condominium complexes. Prior to the tenure of the current manager, Dave Sugrue, it was apparent that the beach may have been redeveloped. Many of the main park facilities had been condemned by the City of New London as unsafe to work in or inhabit, and there was no clear direction for the park. Despite the looming demise of the park, there remained an active community sect that demanded the restoration and revival of Ocean Beach. A push from the community, new management, and the formation of Save Ocean Beach, a group of community volunteers, kept the park alive. Save Ocean Beach continues to work to improve Ocean Beach as a 501(c)(3) non-profit organization. The Organization organizes bake sales, fundraisers, and sells custom-designed boards that can be placed in memorial of a loved one on the boardwalk itself.

In addition to Dave Sugrue, the other most notable park manager throughout its history was undoubtedly Anthony "Tony" Pero. Pero was commonly known as "Mr. Ocean Beach" to locals, and played a very important role in the restoration and continuation of the park through much of the twentieth century. His tenure at Ocean Beach spanned over forty years. His role and legacy at Ocean Beach will continue to play an important role at the park, as the boardwalk is named "The Anthony Pero Boardwalk". It is a well known fact that Ocean Beach Park was modeled after Jones Beach on Long Island in the state of New York.

== See also ==
- City of New London, Connecticut
- Jones Beach State Park
