= Golfland =

Chain of amusement centers

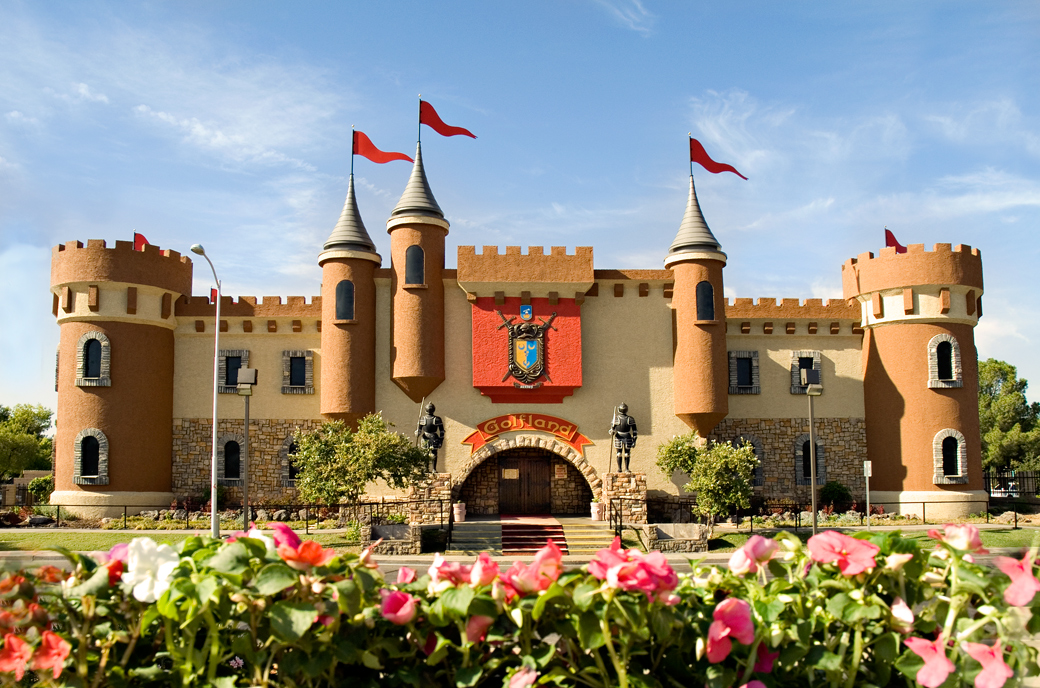
- The Mesa, Arizona location is the flagship park in the Golfland chain.
- Status: Operating
- Opened: 1956
- Website: https://www.golfland.com/

Golfland Entertainment Centers are a chain of family amusement centers, miniature golf courses, and water parks located in California and Arizona. The company was founded in 1953.

== Locations ==
- "Milpitas Golfland" in Milpitas, California (1199 Jacklin Road, 37°26′53″N 121°53′24″W)
- "Camelot Golfland" in Anaheim, California (3200 East Carpenter Avenue, 33°50′59″N 117°51′3″W)
- "Emerald Hills Golfland" in San Jose, California (976 Blossom Hill Road, 37°14′58″N 121°52′3″W)
- "Golden Tee Golfland" in Castro Valley, California (2533 Castro Valley Boulevard, 37°41′32″N 122°5′17″W)
- "Golfland Sunsplash" in Mesa, Arizona (155 West Hampton Avenue, 33°23′17″N 111°50′15″W)
- "Golfland Sunsplash" in Roseville, California (1893 Taylor Road, 38°45′41″N 121°15′24″W)
- "Golfland USA" in Sunnyvale, California (855 East El Camino Real, 37°21′17″N 122°0′55″W)
- "Scandia Golfland" in Fairfield, California (4300 Central Place, 38°13′30″N 122°7′25″W)

=== Former locations ===
- Big Surf — Tempe, Arizona (sold to Inland Oceans LLC, later permanently closed)
- Waterworld — Phoenix, Arizona (Became Wet n Wild and later Hurricane Harbor Phoenix)
- Stockton Golfland — Stockton, California
- Southern Hills Golfland — Stanton, California
- Olathe Golfland — Olathe, Kansas

== History ==
Big Surf was the site of the first Wave Pool in the United States. The Golfland locations in Stanton and Sunnyvale, California were hotbeds for the burgeoning fighting game community in the 1990s, with many players congregating in Golfland arcade halls to play Street Fighter II. Golfland USA in Sunnyvale was the location of Battle by the Bay in 1996, the first nationwide fighting game tournament.

== Sunsplash water parks ==
The locations in Mesa, AZ and Roseville, CA each have a water park attached to their FECs called Sunsplash. These parks charge separate admission and operate in the summer.

The park opened in 1983 and the water park opened in 1986.

In the movie Bill & Ted's Excellent Adventure, Bill, Ted, and Napoleon visit a fictional waterpark called Waterloo in San Dimas, CA. The scenes at Waterloo are a cross between establishing shots at San Dimas Raging Waters and shots with the actors at Golfland Sunsplash.

=== Notable attractions ===
The Sunsplash locations in Roseville and Mesa feature waterslides and other water-based attractions, where most are available at both parks.

- Cauldron (Mesa), Vortex (Roseville): A bowl-shaped waterslide that drops riders four stories down into a rotating bowl that drops into a pool at the bottom. The Roseville installation is the first bowl-shaped waterslide in the world.
- Double Dare: a coil-shaped waterslide where riders enter the ride from a trap door.
- Master Blaster: a water slide that uses pressurized water to propel riders uphill to create a roller coaster experience.
- Revolution: A waterslide that drops riders seven stories toward a bowl, rotating them multiple times
- Sidewinder (Mesa), Stealth (Roseville): A waterslide that drops riders five stories onto a cone-shaped half-pipe that drains into the pool below.
- Stormrider: a large slide that drops riders into a bowl-shaped that rotates toward a drain in the center.
- Thunder Bay wave pool.
