= Smoky Mountain Alpine Coaster =

Longest mountain coaster in US

- Coordinates: 35.7934°N 83.5965°W
- Status: Operating
- Opening date: August 3, 2013

General statistics
- Type: Steel – Mountain coaster
- Manufacturer: Wiegand
- Model: Mountain coaster
- Lift/launch system: Cable lift hill
- Height: 3,937 ft (1,200 m)
- Speed: 27 mph (43 km/h)
- Inversions: 0
- Duration: 7-8 minutes
- Height restriction: 56 in (142 cm)
- Trains: a single car. Riders are arranged 1 across in 2 rows for a total of 2 riders per train.
- Website: http://www.smokymountainalpinecoaster.com/
- Smoky Mountain Alpine Coaster at RCDB

Smoky Mountain Alpine Coaster is a mountain coaster located in Pigeon Forge, Tennessee. It opened on August 3, 2013, and was the first mountain coaster to be built in the Smoky Mountains. Smoky Mountain Alpine Coaster is the second longest downhill track in the United States.

== History ==
The owners began looking to open a mountain coaster in the U.S. in 2010, with the area being pinpointed in 2011. Construction began on the coaster in January 2013, with its opening in August of that year.

== Description ==
One to two riders sit in individual carts, which are pulled to the top of a mountain by the means of a cable. Once released at the top, the cart navigates twists and turns down the mountain on a secured rail. Unlike a conventional roller coaster, the cars are equipped with hand brakes, which allow the riders to control their speed. Additionally, the carts themselves have a magnetic braking system to prevent the cart from going too fast. The ride also has LED lighting for night rides, with over 300,000 lights.
