= Scandia (theme parks) =

Family amusement center chain

Scandia is a brand name of Scandinavian-themed family amusement centers in California. Although each location shares a similar name, nearly each location is owned and operated by different companies. Scandia Fun Center in Sacramento and Scandia Family Fun Center in Victorville are owned by Scandia Amusements. Scandia Family Fun Center in Rohnert Park, California is owned and operated by "Skandia Funland Inc.", while Scandia Golfland in Fairfield, California is owned and operated by Golfland.

All locations are adjacent to a major freeway, and include attractions such as an arcade, bumper boats, batting cages, miniature golf, and a go-kart track.

== History ==
The first park was opened in 1977 at 5070 Hillsdale Boulevard, in Sacramento, with a second location opening in 1979 at 4300 Central Place, in Fairfield. Additional locations were opened in Las Vegas in 1984, Victorville in 1986, and Ontario in 1992. The Ontario location was the only location to include a full amusement park, including two roller coasters, called the "Scandia Screamer" and "Little Screamer", along with twelve other amusement rides.

On September 6, 2005, the Las Vegas park closed, and was replaced by a high-rise development project called Opus Las Vegas.

On March 26, 2007, noise complaints from neighboring residents caused Scandia Fun Center in Sacramento to implement a "No-Shrieking" policy for riders on the Scandia Screamer.

On August 30, 2011, a crane carrying the same ride collapsed onto the batting cages during maintenance, injuring two people. An investigation concluded that workers did not know the weight of the ride was too heavy for the crane that was used to move it.

The Fairfield location filed for Chapter 11 bankruptcy in 2011, emerging from it in 2012. It was later acquired by Golfland and renamed Scandia Golfland.

In April 2018, the Victorville location acquired an amusement park slide from Neverland Ranch and added it to the park as "Thriller".

The Ontario location was sold in February 2019 to an unknown buyer, who did not plan to reopen the park. Some of the attractions were moved to the Victorville location while others, including the Miler Big Coaster, were listed for sale.
