= Parkdale Mall =

- Location: Beaumont, Texas, United States
- Coordinates: 30°7′39.65″N 94°9′36.35″W
- Address: 6155 Eastex Fwy, Beaumont, Texas, United States
- Opened: 1973
- Owner: Christopher Keith Green
- Num. of stores: 150+
- Num. of anchor tenants: 10 (7 open, 3 vacant)
- Floor area: 1,371,870 sq ft (127,451 m^{2}).
- Floors: 1 (2 in Dillard's and JCPenney)
- Parking: 7,918
- Website: parkdalemalltx.com

Parkdale Mall is a regional shopping mall located in Beaumont, Texas, serving the Golden Triangle area. The mall is managed by CBL & Associates Properties, Inc. and is anchored by Dillard's, JCPenney, XXI Forever, Five Below, HomeGoods, and Dick's Sporting Goods. There are three empty anchors that once housed Macy's, Stage, and Sears.

== History ==
Parkdale Mall opened in 1973, with only three anchors: JCPenney, Joske's, and Montgomery Ward. In the mid-1980s, a new wing was added, along with the fourth anchor Sears.

In 1987, Joske's rebranded as Dillard's.

In 2001, Montgomery Ward closed its doors. The store was demolished and was replaced with a new Foley's store in 2002.

In 2003, Linens 'n Things opened at the mall, adjacent to Foley's. This store closed in 2008, as a result of the company's decision to close all stores due to Chapter 11 bankruptcy. The site later became an Ashley HomeStore in 2010, before moving out in 2017.

In 2005, Hurricane Rita hit Beaumont and surrounding communities. The Dillard's Women and Home store was heavily damaged and relocated to the Men's store.

In 2006, as a result of the May Department Stores and Federated Department Stores merger, Foley's became Macy's. As part of a company decision to close underperforming stores, Macy's closed in March 2017.

In 2007, the Dillard's store was renovated, adding 50,000 square feet and using the store's latest design. The renovation was complete in 2008.

In 2009, XXI Forever opened in a space previously occupied by Bealls. Bealls relocated to the old Dillard's Women wing, where a new store was built.

In 2017, Tilt Studio opened a brand new location in the mall. The same year, Fox-affiliate KBTV moved out of the mall and in a brand new studio with sister station KFDM, located off of Interstate 10.

In early 2018, a portion of the Macy's was demolished to make room for Five Below, HomeGoods, Dick's Sporting Goods, and Field & Stream. By mid 2018, however, Field & Stream was no longer a part of the redevelopment plans.

In 2019, Sears announced it was closing its store at the mall, as a part of a larger nationwide closure of 51 underperforming stores.

In May 2020, Stage announced it was filing for bankruptcy and closing all of its stores nationwide. In August of the same year, the location at the mall closed permanently.

== See also ==
- Parkdale Mall website
- Archive of older Parkdale Mall website
- CBL Properties - Portfolio - Parkdale Mall
