= Aguamania =

Water park in Maracaibo, Venezuela

Aquatica
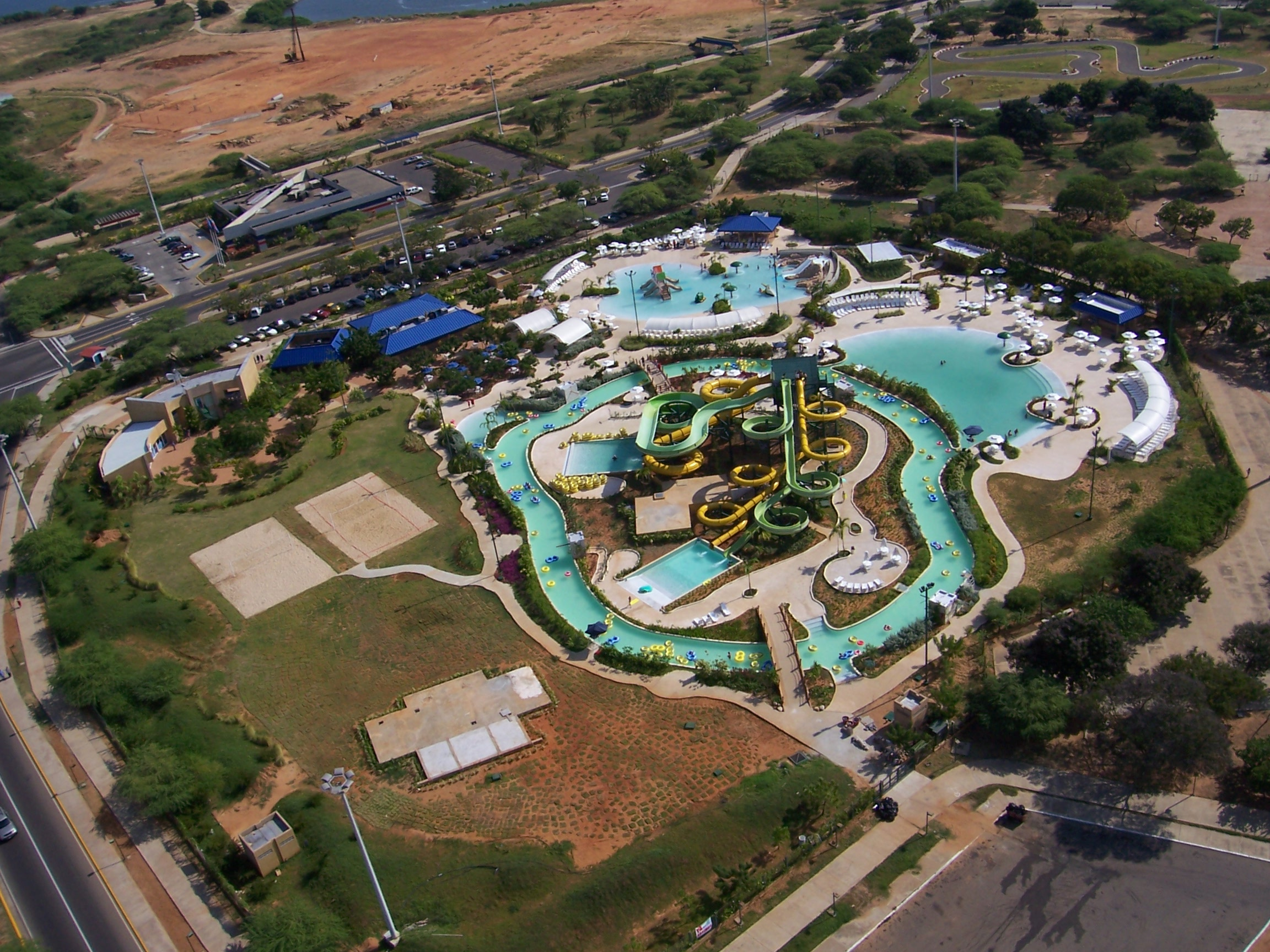
- Aerial view of the park
- Interactive map of Aquatica
- Location: Maracaibo, Venezuela
- Coordinates: maps 10.658464°N 71.593085°W
- Pools: 4 pools
- Water slides: 10 water slides
- Website: Official website

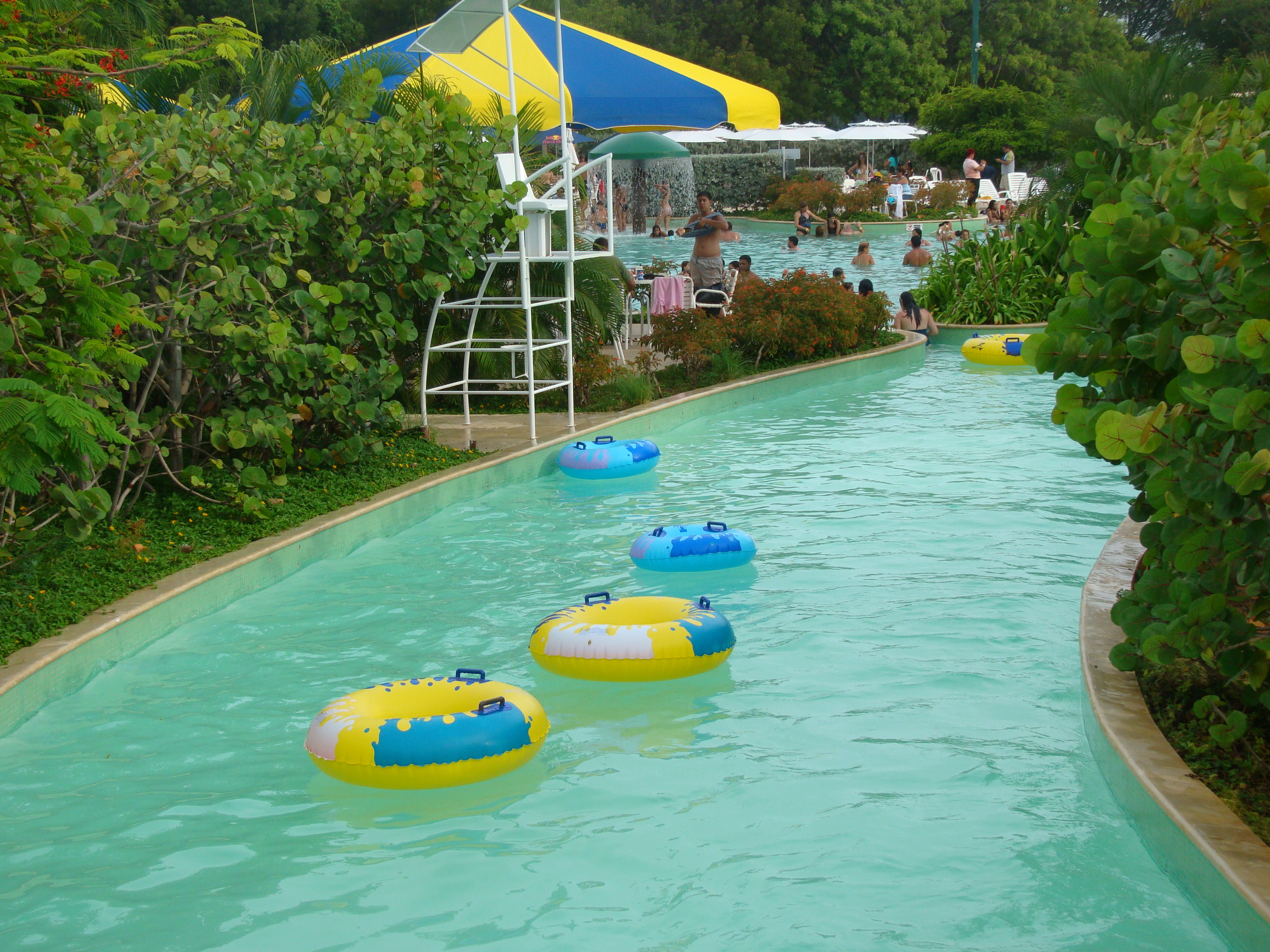
Inside the park

Aquatica, formerly known as Aguamania, is a 25,000-square-metre (270,000 sq ft) water park located in the city of Maracaibo, Venezuela. It is situated inside a public park of the city known locally as "La Vereda del Lago". It is one of only two water parks in Venezuela and the only water park in the west of the country. There are notable views from the park of the surrounding city.

The park contains various facilities including swimming pools for infants, children, and adults. There are also tents, parasols, eating facilities, and gift shops. The pool contains a series of interactive games centered on the culture of the Caribbean, nine slides for younger children, a collection of small fountains. It has two body-slides and two raft-slides. The Catatumbo is one of the park's major attractions, it is effectively a slow river with a wave system and fountains. There are two passages through the river; one is intended to be relaxing while the other provides a more exciting experience. The main pool is a standard large swimming pool for adult guests, equipped with lifeguards. The mascot of Aguamania resembles an anthropoid fuzzy crocodile of the same height as the average adult human.
