= Paul Bunyan Land =

Amusement park in Brainerd, Minnesota

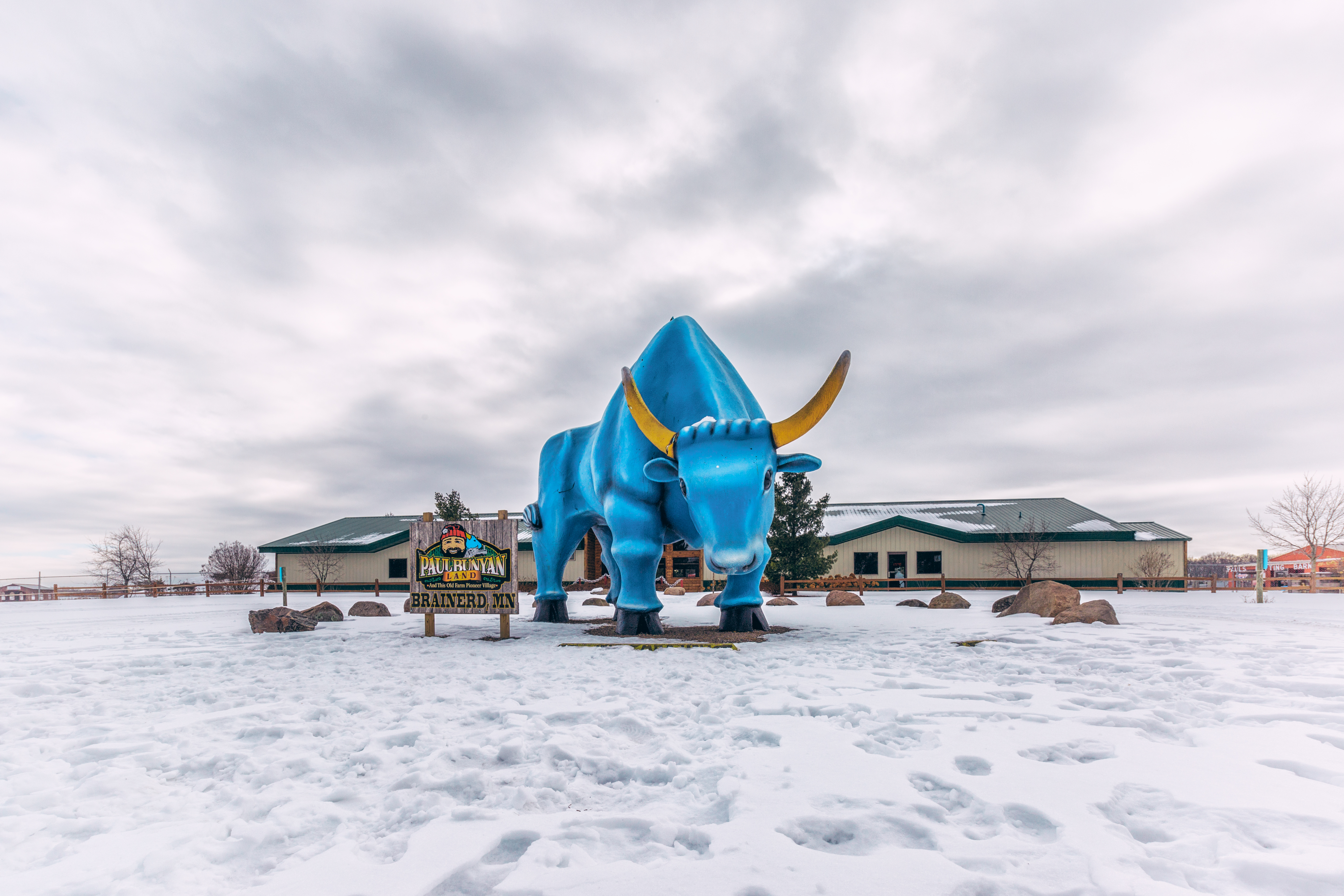
- Entrance
- Interactive map of Paul Bunyan Land
- Location: Brainerd, Minnesota, United States
- Coordinates: 46.3520°N 94.0317°W
- Status: Operating
- Opened: 1950 (original location); 2003 (current location)
- Owner: This Old Farm
- Operating season: Daily Memorial Day weekend through Labor Day
- Area: 180 acres (0.73 km^{2})

Attractions
- Total: 27
- Website: paulbunyanland.com

Paul Bunyan Land is an amusement park in Brainerd, Minnesota, founded in 1950, which is today located on This Old Farm. Its trademark is the 26-foot-tall (7.9 m) animated and talking statue of Paul Bunyan, weighing 5,000 pounds. As guests enter, Paul welcomes them by name.

== History ==
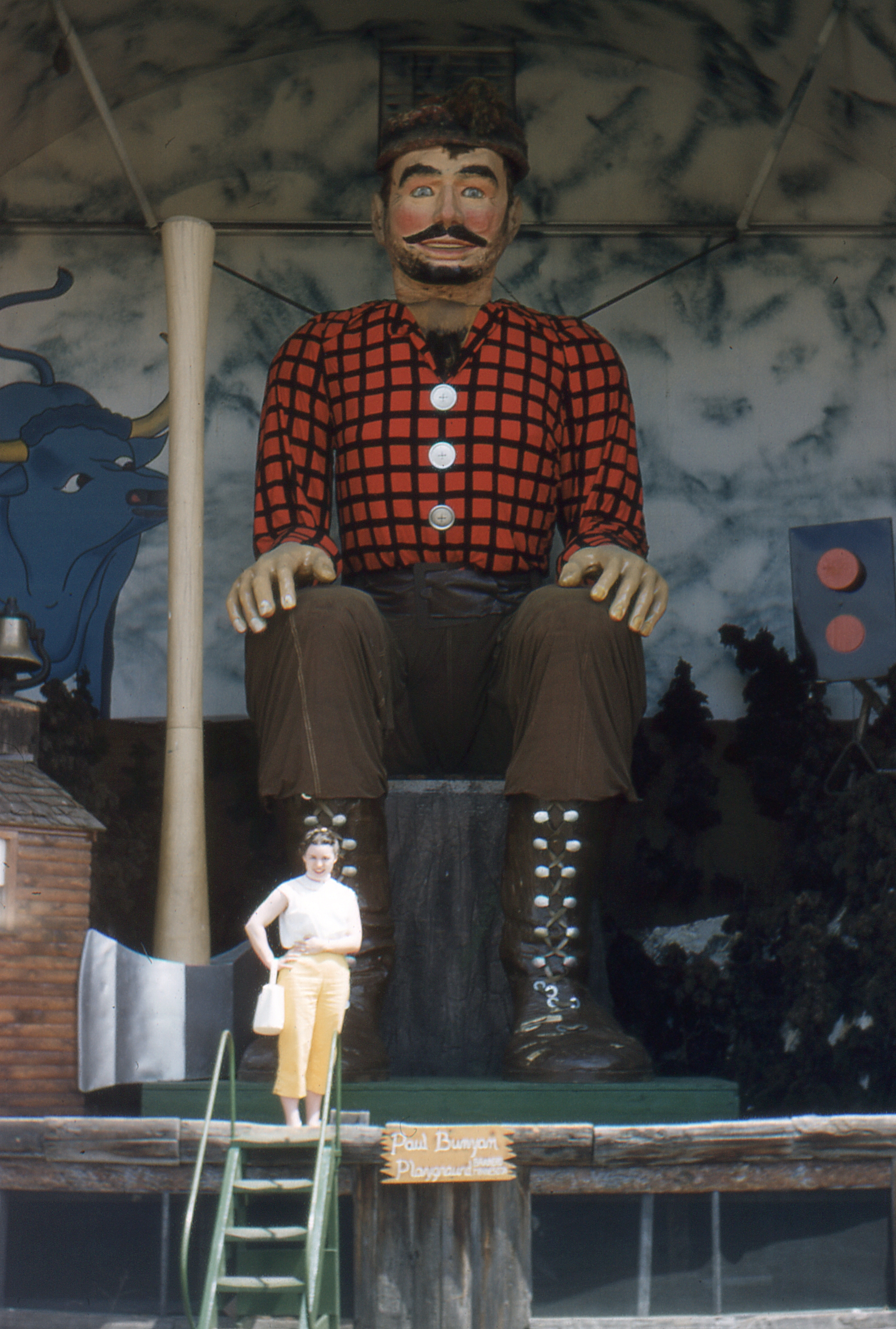
Paul Bunyan statue in 1956

The park, originally known as Paul Bunyan Center, was founded in 1950 by Sherm Levis. It was built around the statue of Paul that Levis and Roy Kuemicheal had purchased the previous year from the Chicago and North Western Transportation Company, which constructed them for an exhibit at the Chicago Railroad Fair. The city of Brainerd dedicated the statue, erected at the intersection of the 210 and 371 highways, with a parade and fireworks on July 30, 1950.

In 1963, during the 20-week season it was open, the park had 200,000 annual visitors, and was pictured in Holiday, Redbook, and National Geographic magazines.

The park grew over time to include over 40 rides surrounded by 30 buildings, among them the train depot built by Disney for Iron Will, a movie filmed in Duluth.

== Move to This Old Farm ==
In 2003, the park announced that due to the high cost of operation, it would be closing and that everything would be auctioned off. However, This Old Farm was interested in keeping the entire park and bought the statues of Paul Bunyan and Babe the Blue Ox as well as the rides. The family-owned business moved the park onto its land six miles east of Brainerd on State Highway 18.

In August 2006, a storm blew over the 19-foot tall, 6,000 pound Babe statue.
