= Hoffman's Playland =

Amusement park in Latham, New York, U.S.

Hoffman’s Playland
- Location: 608 New Loudon Rd, Latham, New York, United States
- Status: Defunct
- Opened: 1952
- Closed: 2014
- Owner: David & Ruth Hoffman
- Operating season: Late March/Early April–September

Attractions
- Total: 18 (at closing)
- Roller coasters: 1 (at closing)
- Water rides: 0

Hoffman's Playland was an amusement park located in Latham, New York on Route 9 that operated from 1952 until its closing on September 14, 2014. At the time of its closure, the park featured 18 rides along with food stands, a Subway restaurant, a party area, and an arcade. The amusement park rides were purchased & relocated by the former Huck Finn's Warehouse and reopened as Huck Finn's Playland at the former furniture store's Albany location.

== History ==
In 1952, William Hoffman founded Hoffman's Playland in Latham, New York. The park originally featured a miniature train and a carousel. William Hoffman and his eventual wife Hedy expanded the park over the years to include more children's rides to cater to the baby boomers. William Hoffman's son David Hoffman took over as the park's manager in the 1970s and eventually owned and operated the park with his wife Ruth until its closing in 2014.

Throughout the 1950s and 1960s, the park expanded to include live animals as well as more children's rides, including many popular Allan Herschell Company rides such as the Boats ride in 1953, Caterpillar in 1955, Sky Fighter Jets in 1956, and Helicopter in 1958. The park expanded again in 1960 to include a Herschell Turnpike ride and a Herschell Little Dipper roller coaster.

As the park progressed into the 1960s and 1970s, it was evident there was a need for larger rides that adults and teenagers could ride, along with additional rides to handle growing crowds. In 1962, the Playland purchased a set of Lusse Auto Skooter Bumper Cars, and in 1965, an Eli Bridge Company Scrambler was added. In 1971, the park added a 50-foot Eli Bridge Ferris Wheel, and 1974 saw the addition of a Frank Hrubetz & Company Paratrooper.

The 1980s would bring even more change to the park. In 1978, Hoffman purchased an Allan Herschell S-24 Iron Horse train from the recently closed Smiley's Happyland (Long Island) and after an extensive refurbishment put it into operation for the 1980 season, replacing the park's original Miniature Train Company engine. Along with the new engine came a newly built entrance building featuring an enlarged train station, ticket booths, and gift shop, Iron Horse Gifts and Antiques. In 1983, a Samba Space Ship ride was added, and in 1985 the Tilt-a-Whirl opened after being relocated from Hanson's Amusement Park. Towards the end of the decade, the park acquired, refurbished and put into operation a second Iron Horse train from Funtown Pier in Seaside Heights, New Jersey. The original Turnpike ride was also retired and replaced by the Venture 4x4 Trucks in 1989.

Food stand at Hoffman's Playland

The park would continue expanding into the 1990s and early 2000s. While Iron Horse Gifts and Antiques permanently closed in the late 1990s, the year 2000 brought the addition of the Balloon Flight and Rock-Spin-Roll rides, bought at auction and relocated from Hamel's Amusement Park in Louisiana. In 2005, the park opened a year-round Subway restaurant in an expanded entrance building. In 2007, the park opened its final ride, the Red Baron, a plane ride which was purchased and refurbished from the recently closed Catskill Game Farm.

In 2013, rumors surfaced that the Hoffmans would retire and close the park. The park remained open for the 2013 season, however at the start of the 2014 season, the owners, Dave and Ruth Hoffman, announced their intent to retire and close the park in September. The park officially closed at 6pm on September 14, 2014. Large crowds on the last day of operation resulted in rides being run well past closing time and into the evening.

Throughout the last season, the Hoffmans searched for a local buyer of the rides but were not successful. The park's rides and equipment were scheduled to go to auction, however shortly after the park closed, Huck Finn's Warehouse in nearby downtown Albany made an offer to purchase the amusement rides and equipment. The park was dismantled and moved to a newly built park next to the former Huck Finn's Warehouse. The new park, Huck Finn's Playland, opened in June 2015.

The park generally operated from late March/early April (depending on the year) through the end of September. The park was open on weekends during the spring and fall, and daily during the summer months. The park opened at noon on operating days and closed as early as 6 p.m. during the spring and fall, and 9 p.m. or 10 p.m. during the busy summer months.

Since the park closed in September 2014, the land has sat vacant and overgrown. In 2018, the site was being considered for a senior housing project.

== Rides ==
At the time of the park's closing, 18 rides were in operation. All except the Lusse Bumper Cars were moved to Huck Finn's Playland. The Bumper Cars were put into storage and later sold to Knoebels Amusement Resort where they now operate.

Ride	Image	Year Opened / (Manufactured)	Year Closed	Manufacturer	Notes
Hoffman's Playland Railroad		1952 (1952 / 1965 / 1967)	2014	Miniature Train Company/Allan Herschell Company	The original train (1952-1979) was manufactured by the Miniature Train Company. The 1980 and 1988 replacement engines were manufactured by the Allan Herschell Company.
Merry-Go-Round		1953	2014	Allan Herschell Company	36-foot Merry-Go-Round with 3-abreast horses and 2 chariots.
Boats		1953	2014	Allan Herschell Company	Circular wet boat ride.
Little Wheel		1959	2014	Eli Bridge Company	Miniature Eli Bridge ferris wheel.
Red Baron		2007 (1985)	2014	Chance Manufacturing	Aerial plane ride with individual controls to lower/raise the plane. Relocated from the Catskill Game Farm.
Balloon Flight		2000 (1980)	2014	Bradley & Kaye	Aerial balloon ride. Relocated from Hamel's Amusement Park (Louisiana).
Umbrella Ride		1965	2014	Hampton	Hampton combo ride.
Caterpillar		1955	2014	Allan Herschell Company	Circular revolving Caterpillar ride.
Rock-Spin-Roll		2000 (1976)	2014	Hampton	Hampton Rock-Spin-Roll ride. Relocated from Hamel's Amusement Park (Louisiana).
Helicopters		1958	2014	Allan Herschell Company	Circular helicopter ride with individual bars to control height.
Bumper Cars		1962	2014	Lusse Brothers'	Classic Lusse Bumper Cars.
Scrambler		1965	2014	Eli Bridge Company	Classic Eli Bridge Scrambler ride.
Paratrooper		1974	2014	Hrubetz	Hydraulic-lift Paratrooper ride.
Tilt-a-Whirl		1985 (1974)	2014	Sellner Manufacturing	Classic Tilt-a-Whirl ride. Relocated from Hanson's Amusement Park (Pennsylvania).
Roller Coaster		1960	2014	Allan Herschell Company	Little Dipper Herschell roller coaster.
Big Wheel		1971	2014	Eli Bridge Company	50 foot Eli Bridge ferris wheel.
4x4 Trucks		1989	2014	Venture	Individual cars that ran along a tracked route.
Samba		1983	2007	Zamperla	Space themed elevating ride.
Sky Fighter Jets		1956	2014	Allan Herschell Company	Aerial jet ride with shooting guns.
Tanks		Unknown	Unknown	Allan Herschell Company	Circular tank ride. Present in 1956 and 1980 photos. Actual opening and closing dates unknown.
Unknown		Unknown	Unknown	Allan Herschell Company	Circular car ride identified from 1956 photos. Unknown name, opening date or closing date.
Roadway Ride		Unknown	1988	Allan Herschell Company	Herschell Roadway car ride. Was replaced by the Venture 4x4 Trucks ride.

== See also ==
- Huck Finn's Playland
- List of defunct amusement parks
