= Sunset Park, La Libertad =

Amusement park in El Salvador

Sunset Park
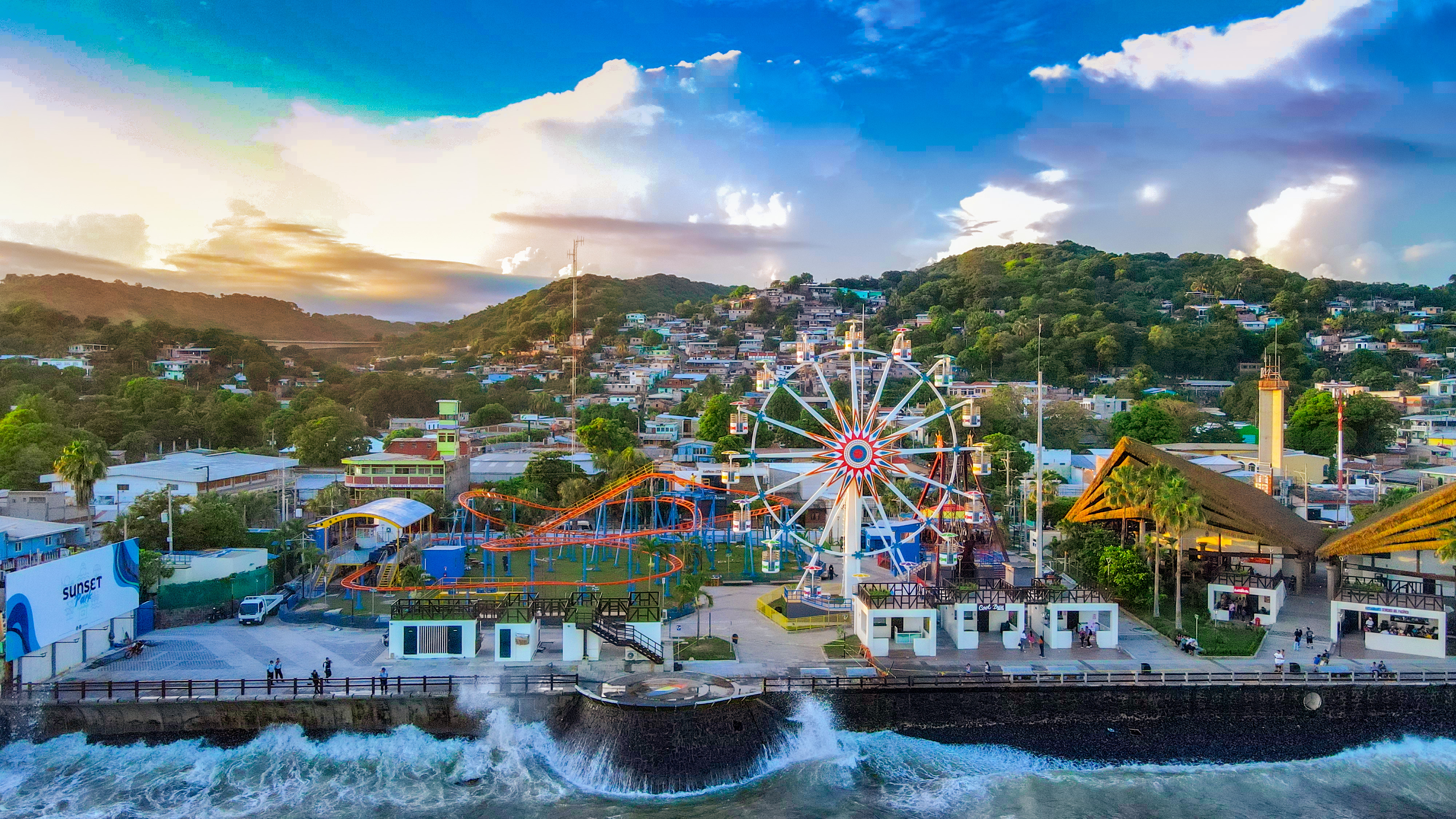
- Interactive map of Sunset Park
- Location: La Libertad, El Salvador
- Coordinates: 13°29′13″N 89°19′15″W
- Status: Operating
- Opened: 27 August 2022

Attractions
- Total: 5
- Roller coasters: 1

Sunset Park is an amusement park located in La Libertad, El Salvador, on the Pacific coast. Inaugurated on August 27, 2022, within the Tourist Complex of Puerto de La Libertad. It is part of the “Surf City” project— a government initiative aimed at promoting the development of the country's coastal zone through the construction of scenic viewpoints, piers, urban infrastructure, and recreational areas.

== History ==
The park was inaugurated by Salvadoran president Nayib Bukele and Chinese ambassador to El Salvador Ou Jianhong on 26 August 2022. The park has five attractions which were donated by China: a ferris wheel, a pirate ship, a carousel, a roller coaster, and a jumping platform. The park officially opened the following day.

The park is a part of Bukele's plan to expand Surf City, which is nearby. The park was built with the support of the Chinese government.

== Facilities and services ==
The park is located on the Pacific coast, offering panoramic ocean views from several of its rides. It features a food court with a dozen dining spots, candy kiosks, souvenir shops, restrooms, a first aid station, and designated breastfeeding areas. These facilities are designed to provide comprehensive services for both local and international visitors.

== Impact and reception ==
Since its opening, Sunset Park has become one of the country's top tourist attractions. In its first three months of operation, it welcomed nearly 194,000 visitors, surpassing 700,000 in its first year. It is estimated that the greater Puerto de La Libertad tourism complex, which includes the park, attracts over 2.2 million visitors annually.

== Impact ==
Sunset Park is considered the first permanent seaside amusement park in Central America. Its creation supports the Surf City initiative and contributes to El Salvador's repositioning as a regional tourism destination.

== See also ==
- List of amusement parks in the Americas
