= Grand Texas Theme Park =

Amusement park in Texas, United States

Grand Texas Theme Park Resort
- Location within Texas
- Location: New Caney, Texas, U.S.
- Coordinates: 30.194569°N 95.200088°W
- Status: Planned
- Owner: Grand Texas Sports and Entertainment District
- Area: 645 acres (261 ha)

Attractions
- Total: 25
- Roller coasters: 5
- Water rides: 2
- Website: http://grandtx.com/

Grand Texas Theme Park is a theme park currently planned near Houston, Texas, in the United States. It will be located within the Grand Texas Sports and Entertainment District in New Caney, Montgomery County at Interstate 69 (US Highway 59) and SH 242. in Patton Village. Site work began in July 2013, and groundbreaking was in December 2017. It will feature seven theme areas related to Texas history and culture.

== Description ==
The park will have seven theme areas related to Texas history and culture. It is managed by Innovative Leisure Partners.

== Construction ==
Site work began in July 2013. Brae Burn Construction Company, based in Houston, served as the contractor for the first phase of construction. Dallas-based GHA Architects designed the park. Groundbreaking was scheduled to begin in the fall of 2013. It was announced that construction on the Grand Texas Theme Park would begin once the construction of Big Rivers was in operations. On December 14, 2017, the groundbreaking ceremony for Big Rivers Waterpark and Gator Bayou Adventure Park was held.

The Big Rivers and Gator Bayou Adventure Park were originally scheduled to open on June 29, 2018 but have been delayed because of inclement weather during construction. Big Rivers and Gator Bayou Adventure Park opened to the public on May 25, 2019.
