= List of summer toboggans =

This is a list of summer toboggan installations worldwide, including both alpine slide and mountain coaster types.

== Andorra ==
Name	Location	Type	Manufacturer	Note
Màgic Gliss	Canillo	Coaster	Wiegand	730 m (Downslide 550 m, Elevator 180 m) - Optional VR ride experience available
Tobotronc Naturlandia	Sant Julià de Lòria	Coaster	Wiegand	5300m (Elevator 1700m, Downslide 3600m) - World's longest toboggan

== Australia ==
Name	Location	Type	Manufacturer	Note
The Big Banana Fun Park	Coffs Harbour, NSW	Coaster		
Corin Forest	Canberra, ACT			
Funfields	Whittlesea, VIC	Slide		
Jamberoo Action Park	Jamberoo, NSW	Slide		Opened June 2024
Thredbo Alpine Coaster	Thredbo, NSW	Coaster	Wiegand	
Toboggan Hill Park	Nelson Bay, NSW	Slide		

== Austria ==
Name	Location	Type	Manufacturer	Note
Abtenau Summer Toboggan	near Salzburg	Coaster		1.920 kilometres (1.2 mi) long, reaching speeds of up to 40 km/h (25 mph)
Alpine Coaster Golm	Golm, Tyrol	Coaster		An all-weather toboggan run at with 44 jumps, a 360° traffic circle and 15 x 180° turns. The coaster is 2.6 kilometres (1.6 mi) in length
Familien Coaster Schneisenfeger	Serfaus, Tyrol	Coaster		A 1.5 kilometres (0.9 mi) long all weather alpine coaster with numerous 360-degree spins and hairpin bends.
Imst Alpine Coaster	Imst, Tyrol	Coaster		The world's second longest mountain coaster, 3.5 kilometres (2.2 mi) long
Mieders Summer Toboggan Run	Serlesbahnen, Tyrol	Monorail coaster		The world's steepest alpine coaster with a monorail track which measures 2.8 kilometres (1.7 mi) in length
Osttirodler	Lienz	Coaster	Wiegand	2700 m
Sommerrodelbahn Ossiacher See	Ossiach, Carinthia	Slide		Two parallel steel slides 46.66977°N 13.98019°E
Sommerrodelbahn Pendolino	Nassfeld, Carinthia	Coaster		A monorail coaster that is touted to be the longest in Cathinthia at 2.0 kilometres (1.2 mi). The toboggan run covers an altitude difference of about 400 metres
Spielpark Leutasch	Leutasch, Tyrol	Slide		One concrete slide
Timoks Alpine Coaster	Fieberbrunn, Tirol	Coaster		An alpine coaster that is 1.16 kilometres (0.7 mi) in length and has several special features including a 'Big Snake' and a 360° carousel
Kaiserburg Bob	Bad Kleinkirchheim, Carinthia	Coaster		An alpine coaster that is 1.4 kilometres (0.9 mi) in length passing through 26 curves. With an average incline of 12% speeds of up to 40 km/h are possible. The highlight is the 7-metre-high loop in the finishing straights.
Nocky Flitzer	Turracher Höhe, Carinthia	Coaster		An alpine coaster that is 1.6 kilometres (1.0 mi) in length. The coaster starts at 2,000m above sea level and flows down to 1,763m.

== Belgium ==
Name	Location	Type	Manufacturer	Note
Dawson Duel	Bellewaerde, Ypres, Belgium	Sport Coaster	Wiegand	Opened on May 5, 2017. Two tracks, each with a length of 1,607.6 feet (490.0 m), a top speed of 24.9 mph (40.1 km/h), and a boarding height of 82 feet (25 m). Unlike the majority of summer toboggans, this attraction is built on an elevated, man-made surface, and has no rider-controlled braking.

== Canada ==
Name	Location	Type	Manufacturer	Note
The Coaster	Cypress Mountain Ski Area, West Vancouver, British Columbia	Coaster	Sunkid GmbH	Scheduled to open in the summer of 2021. The Coaster will reach a top speed of 40 km/h (25 mph) over a length of 1,700 metres (5,577 ft).
The Pipe	Revelstoke Mountain Resort, Revelstoke, British Columbia	Monorail coaster	Brandauer	Top speed of 42 km/h (26 mph) over a length of 1,400 metres (4,593 ft) and a 279 metres (915.4 ft) elevation descent.
Ridge Runner Mountain Coaster	Blue Mountain, Ontario	Coaster	Wiegand	Downhill length 3,650 feet (1,110 m) with a maximum speed of 26 mph (42 km/h).
Viking Mountain Coaster	Mont Saint-Sauveur, Quebec	Coaster	Wiegand	

== China ==
Name	Location	Type	Manufacturer	Note
Badaling Biconvex Pulley	Badaling, Beijing	Coaster		
Hongluo Temple Alpine Coaster	Hongluo Temple, Beijing	Coaster	Wiegand	
Mutianyu Great Wall Speed Chute	Mutianyu, Beijing	Slide	Wiegand	One steel slide and one chair lift

== Finland ==
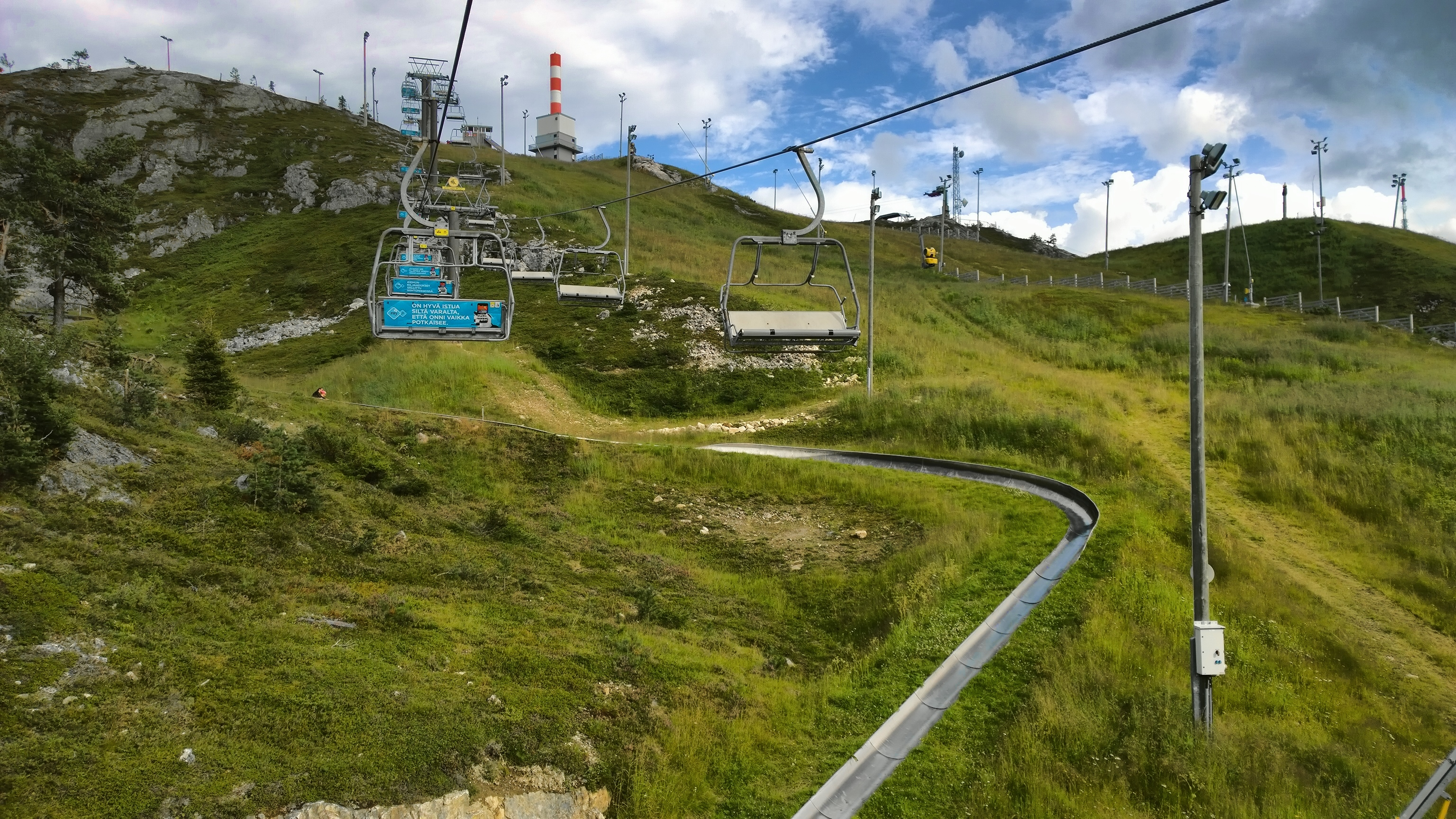
View of the summer sledge track in Ruka

Name	Location	Type	Manufacturer	Note
Summer sled track	Ruka, Kuusamo	Slide		
Ruka Coaster	Ruka, Kuusamo	Coaster	Wiegand	Due to open in July 2025. The first coaster in Finland

== France ==
Name	Location	Type	Manufacturer	Note
La Schlucht Rail Luge	La Schlucht, Vosges	Coaster		The coaster is 1.245 kilometres (0.8 mi) in length and has a vertical descent of 0.75 kilometres (0.5 mi) .
Alpine Coaster	Parc des Combes, France	Coaster		The coaster is circa 0.5 kilometres (0.3 mi) in length and is contained within the Parc des Combes amusement park.
Hautacam Alpine Luge	Vallées de Gavarnie, France	Coaster		Located in the Hautes-Pyrénées, the coaster is circa 1 kilometre (0.6 mi) in length.
Draco'Snow Coaster	Font-Romeu Pyrenees 2000, France	Coaster		Opened in summer 2025, this coaster in is circa in the Catalan-Pyrénées is 0.82 kilometres (0.5 mi) in length.
	Le Mont-Dore, Massif Central	Slide		One steel slide

== Germany ==
Name	Location	Type	Manufacturer	Note
	Sankt Andreasberg	Slide		One concrete slide
Alpine Coaster	Kolbensattel, Oberammergau	Coaster	Wiegand	
Alpsee Bergwelt		Coaster	Wiegand	2.8 km
Hasenhorn Coaster	Todtnau, Black Forest	Coaster	Wiegand	Approximately 2.9 kilometres (1.8 mi) long, one of the longest mountain coasters in Germany
Mehliskopf Bobbahn	Mehliskopf	Coaster	Wiegand	
Sommerrodelbahn Burg Stargard		Slide		One steel slide

== Hungary ==
Name	Location	Type	Manufacturer	Year of opening	Length	Elevation	Note
Zemplén Kalandpark	Sátoraljaújhely	Coaster	Wiegand	2009	2275m (Elevator 650m, Downslide 1625m)	200m	Longest toboggan of Hungary and Central and Eastern Europe
Mecsextrém Park	Pécs	Coaster	Wiegand	2010	1050m (Elevator 350m, Downlide 700m)	35m	
Sobri Jóska Élménypark	Kislőd	Coaster	Wiegand	2012	1000m (Elevator 300m, Downslide 700m)	44m	
Oxygen Adrenalin Park	Gyöngyös-Sástó	Coaster	Wiegand	2006	930m (Elevator 430m, Downslide 500m)	35m	
Soproni bobpálya	Sopron	Slide	Wiegand	2006	900m steel slide (Elevator 320m, Downslide 580m)	30m	
Miskolctapolcai bobpálya	Miskolc	Coaster	Wiegand	2007	800m (Elevator 300m, Downslide 500m)	54m	
BalatoniBob Szabadidőpark	Balatonfűzfő	Coaster	Wiegand	Panorama track 2015, Tunnel track 2001	Panorama track 700m (Elevator 200m, Downslide 500m, Tunnel track 760m (Elevator 200m. Downslide 500m)	30m	Two parallel coaster tracks
Visegrádi bobpálya	Visegrád	Coaster slide	Wiegand	Coaster 2002, Slide 1991	Coaster 700m (Elevator 160m, Downslide 540m), slide 700m (Elevator 160m, Downslide 500m)	30m	Two parallel tracks, one coaster and one steel slide
Budapesti bobpálya	Budapest XI. district	Slide	Wiegand	1995	700m (Elevator 270m, Downslide 430m)	30m	Steel slide
X-trém Bob	Szilvásvárad	Monorail coaster	Brandauer	2008	620m (Elevator 270m, Downslide 350m)	52m	Steepest toboggan track of Hungary
Balatonboglár Kalandpark	Balatonboglár	Coaster	Wiegand	2013	400m (Elevator 50m, Downslide 350m)	15m	
Morotva Liget	Berettyóújfalu	Bobkart	Ferrari	2015	512m	-	horizontal track with electric bobkarts

== Iran ==
Name	Location	Type	Manufacturer	Note
Tochal	Tehran	Coaster		

== Italy ==
Name	Location	Type	Manufacturer	Note
Funbob	Adventure Park Cimone, Sestola, Emilia-Romagna.	Coaster		

== Jamaica ==
Name	Location	Type	Manufacturer	Note
Rainforest	Mystic Mountain	Coaster	Wiegand	

== Japan ==
Name	Location	Type	Manufacturer	Note
	Toriidaira Yamabiko Park	Slide		One steel slide

== Kazakhstan ==
Name	Location	Type	Manufacturer	Note
Fast Coaster	Kók_Tóbe_Park, Almaty	Coaster		45 km/s speed

== New Zealand ==
Name	Location	Type	Manufacturer	Note
	Christchurch Adventure Park, a mountain bike park in Christchurch	Coaster		Planned for December 2017

== Russia ==
Name	Location	Type	Manufacturer	Note
Rodelbahn	Bobroviy Log Park, Krasnoyarsk	Coaster		
Rodelbahn	Rosa Khutor mountain resort, Sochi	Coaster		

== Serbia ==
Name	Location	Type	Manufacturer	Note
Alpine Coaster	Kopaonik	Coaster		

== Slovakia ==
Name	Location	Type	Manufacturer	Note
Alpine Coaster	Veľká Rača, Kysucké Beskydy	Coaster		

== Spain ==
Name	Location	Type	Manufacturer	Note
Calafell Slide	Calafell	Slide	Wiegand	700 m - One steel slide - First summer toboggan built in mainland Spain

== Sweden ==
Name	Location	Type	Manufacturer	Note
Isaberg	Hestra	Coaster		
Rättviksbacken	Rättvik	Slide		
Hammarbybacken	Stockholm	Coaster		

== Switzerland ==
Name	Location	Type	Manufacturer	Note
Glacier 3000	Gstaad, BE	Coaster		The highest alpine coaster in the world, with a starting elevation of 2,971 metres (9,747 ft) and a downhill run of 1,000 metres (3,300 ft) reaching a top speed of 25 mph (40 km/h). Opened in March 2007.
Pradaschier	Churwalden, GR	Coaster	Wiegand	The longest alpine coaster in Switzerland: 3,060 metres (10,040 ft) long, starting elevation 1,750 metres (5,740 ft), height difference 480 metres (1,570 ft).
Wirzweli	Dallenwil, NW	Slide	Wiegand	535 metres (1,755 ft) long, elevation 1,200 metres (3,900 ft).
Ristis	Engelberg, OW	Slide	Wiegand	660 metres (2,170 ft) long, elevation 1,600 metres (5,200 ft).
Fräkigaudi	Pilatus, NW	Slide		The longest alpine slide in Switzerland: 1,350 metres (4,430 ft) long, elevation 1,400 metres (4,600 ft).
Stuckli Run	Mostelberg, Sattel, SZ	Slide		600 metres (2,000 ft) long, elevation 1,200 metres (3,900 ft).
Pfingstegg	Grindelwald, BE	Slide		725 metres (2,379 ft) long, elevation 1,350 metres (4,430 ft).

== Ukraine ==
Name	Location	Type	Manufacturer	Note
Bukovel	Bukovel	Coaster	Wiegand	1,000 metres (3,300 ft) long. Total length 1,500 metres (4,900 ft)

== United Kingdom ==
Name	Location	Type	Manufacturer	Note
Fforest Coaster	Zip World, Betws-y-Coed, Wales	Coaster		The first alpine coaster in the UK. It has a downhill run of 2,330 feet (710 m) reaching a top speed of 25 mph (40 km/h). Opened in May 2017.
Midlothian Alpine Coaster	Midlothian Snowsports Centre	Coaster		The first alpine coaster in Scotland, the overall length of the coaster is 980 metres (315 metres uphill & 667 metres downhill).
Toboggan Run	Robin Hill Country Park	Slide		One steel slide measuring 440m in length.
Thunder Luge Toboggan Run	Watermouth Castle	Slide		250 metre steel slide
Bobsleigh	Oakwood Theme Park	Slide		
	Pembrey Country Park	Slide		Longest "Cobra Toboggan" run in Wales
	Chatham Snowsports Centre, Gillingham, Kent	Slide		Longest Alpine Slide in UK
	Llandudno Snowsports Centre, Llandudno, Wales	Slide		780m, longest "Cresta Toboggan" run in Wales
	Plymouth Snowsports Centre, Plymouth, Devon	Slide		650m
	Swadlincote Snowsports Centre, Swadlincote, Derbyshire	Slide		500m

== United States ==
Name	State	Location	Type	Manufacturer	Note
Alpine Mountain Coaster	NJ	Vernon Township, Action Park	Coaster	Wiegand	Opened in 2014
Anakeesta Rail Runner	TN	Gatlinburg | Anakeesta	Coaster		Opened in 2018
Attitash Mountain Resort	NH	Bartlett	Slide		Two concrete/fiberglass slides
Bear Mountain	CA	Big Bear Lake	Slide		Two concrete slides
The Branson Coaster	MO	Branson	Coaster	Wiegand	Opened in 2017
Breathtaker	CO	Aspen | Aspen Snowmass	Coaster		
Breckenridge Alpine Side	CO	Breckenridge | Breckenridge Ski Resort	Slide		Three fiberglass slides
Bromley Mountain	VT	Manchester	Slide		Three fiberglass slides
Camelback Mountain	PA	Tannersville	Slide		Two fiberglass slides
Canyon Coaster	AZ	Williams	Coaster	Wiegand	Opened in April, 2022
Chestnut Mountain	IL	Galena	Slide		Two slides
Cliffside Coaster	NY	Lake Placid	Coaster	ADG	Longest in the United States
The Coaster	TN	Pigeon Forge, Goats on the Roof	Coaster		Opened in 2015
The Cowboy Coaster	WY	Jackson, Snow King	Coaster	Wiegand	
Copper Mountain Resort	CO	Copper Mountain	Coaster	ADG	Opened in 2017
Cranmore Mountain Coaster	NH	North Conway, Cranmore Mountain Resort	Coaster	Wiegand	Opened in 2010
Crystal Mountain alpine slide	MI	Thompsonville | Crystal Mountain resort	Slide		
Durango Mountain Resort	CO	Durango	Slide		Two concrete slides
Forest Flyer	CO	Vail, Vail Ski Resort	Coaster	Wiegand	Opened in 2015
Gatlinburg Mountain Coaster	TN	Gatlinburg	Coaster		Opened in August 2014
Georgia Mountain Coaster	GA	Helen	Coaster	Wiegand	Opened in 2019
Glenwood Alpine Coaster	CO	Glenwood | Glenwood Caverns Adventure Park	Coaster	Wiegand	Opened in 2005
Gold Runner Mountain Coaster	CO	Breckenridge, Breckenridge Ski Resort	Coaster	Wiegand	Opened in 2010
Gunstock Mountain Coaster	NH	Gilford, Gunstock Mountain Resort	Coaster	Wiegand	Opened in August 2016
The Hellbender Smoky Mountain Coaster	TN	Gatlinburg | Anakeesta	Coaster		Opened in October 2023
Heritage Square	CO	Golden	Slide		Two slides - CLOSED
Inferno Mountain Coaster	CO	Durango | Purgatory Resort	Coaster		
Jiminy Peak Alpine Super Slide	MA	Hancock | Jiminy Peak	Slide		
Jiminy Peak Mountain Coaster	MA	Hancock | Jiminy Peak	Coaster	Wiegand	Opened in July 2006
Kentucky Action Park	KY	Cave City	Slide		
Killington Beast	VT	Killington | Killington Ski Resort	Coaster	ADG	Opened in July 2015
Lutsen Mountains	MN	Lutsen	Slide		
Mineshaft Coaster	CA	Big Bear Lake | Alpine Slide at Magic Mountain	Coaster	Wiegand	Opened in July 2020
Mount Hood Skibowl	OR	Mount Hood	Slide		
Mustang Mountain Coaster	CO	Estes Park	Coaster		Opened May 2021
Nor'Easter	NH	Bartlett | Attitash Mountain Resort	Coaster	Alpine Products	Opened in November 2010
Nor'Easter	NY	Cortland | Greek Peak Mountain Resort	Coaster	Wiegand	Opened in 2014
Ober Mountain Slide	TN	Gatlinburg | Ober Gatlinburg	Slide		Two fiberglass slides
Outlaw Mountain Coaster	CO	Steamboat Springs, Steamboat Ski Resort	Coaster	Wiegand	Opened in August 2017
Park City Alpine Slide	UT	Park City	Slide		Four fiberglass slides
Park City Alpine Coaster	UT	Park City, Park City Mountain Resort	Coaster	Wiegand	Opened in August 2006
Pico Mountain Ski Area	VT	Killington	Slide		Two fiberglass slides - CLOSED
Poconos	PA	Tannersville | Camelback Mountain Resort	Coaster	ADG	Opened in July 2012
Ridge Rider Mountain Coaster	CA	South Lake Tahoe | Heavenly Mountain Resort	Coaster	Wiegand	Opened in July 2006
Rowdy Bear Mountain Coaster	TN	Gatlinburg	Coaster		Opened in June 2017
Rocky Mountain Coaster	CO	Copper Mountain			
Rocky Top Mountain Coaster	TN	Pigeon Forge	Coaster		Opened in 2018
Runaway Mountain Coaster	MO	Branson, Branson Mountain Adventure	Coaster	ADG	Opened in August 2016
Rushmore Mountain Coaster	SD	Keystone | Rush Mountain Adventure Park	Coaster	Wiegand	
Rushmore Tramway Adventures Alpine Slide	SD	Keystone	Slide		
Seven Springs Mountain Resort	PA	Somerset	Slide		Two concrete slides
Ski Broadmoor	CO	Colorado Springs	Coaster		Closed
Ski Mountain Coaster	TN	Gatlinburg, Ober Gatlinburg	Coaster	ADG	Opened in September 2015
Sky High	NY	Ellicottville | Holiday Valley Resort	Coaster	Wiegand	Opened in August 2011
Smoky Mountain Alpine Coaster	TN	Pigeon Forge	Coaster		Opened in August 2013
Snow King Mountain	WY	Jackson	Slide		
Snowbird Alpine Slide	UT	Snowbird | Snowbird Ski Resort	Slide		
Snowbird Mountain Coaster	UT	Snowbird | Snowbird Ski Resort	Coaster	Wiegand	
Steamboat Ski Resort	CO	Steamboat Springs	Slide		
Stowe Mountain Resort	VT	Stowe	Slide		Two fiberglass slides - CLOSED
Thunderbolt Mountain Coaster	MA	Charlemont, Berkshire East Ski Resort	Coaster	ADG	Opened in 2014
Timber Twister	MN	Duluth, Spirit Mountain	Coaster	Wiegand	
Timber Ripper	VT	Ludlow, Okemo Mountain Resort	Coaster	Wiegand	Opened in December 2010
Utah Olympic Park	UT	Park City	Slide		One steel slide
Wild Mountain	MN	Taylors Falls	Slide		
Wilderness Run Alpine Coaster	NC	Banner Elk	Coaster	Wiegand	Opened in May 2020
Winter Park Resort	CO	Winter Park	Slide		
Wisp Resort Mountain Coaster	MD	McHenry | Wisp Ski Resort	Coaster	Wiegand	
Whitefish Mountain Resort	MT	Whitefish	Slide		

== Vietnam ==
Name	Location	Type	Manufacturer	Note
Datanla Waterfall	Đà Lạt	Coaster	Wiegand	
