= Pollock Building =

United States historic place in Williams, Arizona

- U.S. Historic district – Contributing property
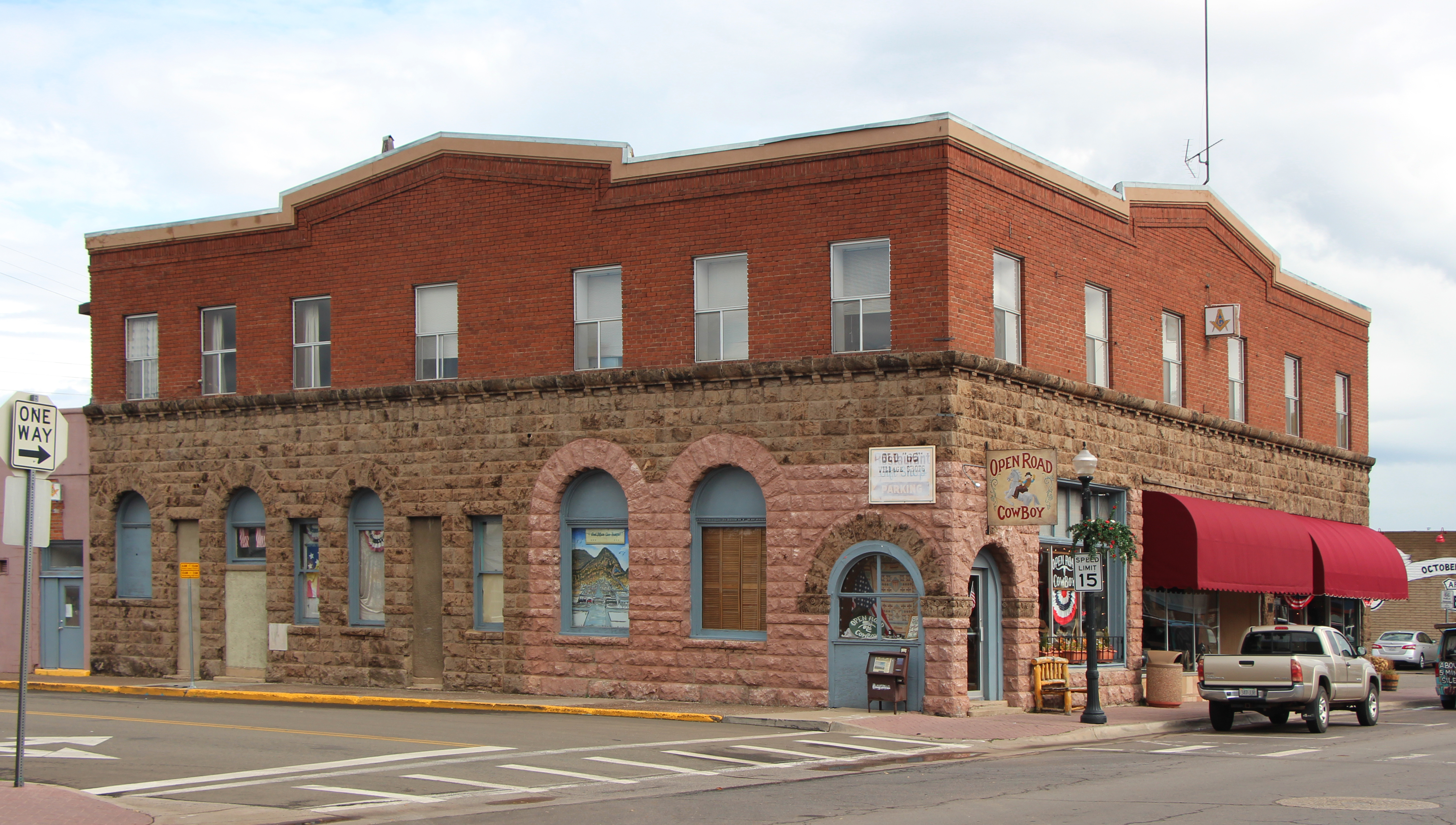

The Pollock Building, sometimes known as the Williams Masonic Lodge, is a historic building in Williams, Arizona. It is a contributing property of the Williams Historic Business District, which is on the National Register of Historic Places for Coconino County, Arizona.

The building is an example of two different types of architecture, the Romanesque of the late 1800s as well as the more modern brick construction methods of the early 20th century. The original building, built in 1901, was constructed almost entirely out of local stone, with little to no wood in case of fire. The building served as a bank as well as housing several different stores. In 1927 a Masonic organization purchased the building and began construction on a second story made of brick. This building is still in use to this day, and demonstrates how different architectural influences have affected Northern Arizona architecture.

== History ==
The Pollock Building was constructed in 1901 by T. E. Pollock after a devastating fire that destroyed much of Williams, Arizona, the same year. Pollock, a prominent businessman in Northern Arizona, made this building the location for his Arizona Central Bank. Along with the bank, the Pollock Building also housed several businesses including Canall's Arizona Telephone and Telegraph Company, the Williams News, and Perkins "Dime" Store. After 1917 Pollock moved his bank to a new building. Other businesses began to move out, and by the time the Masons purchased the building in 1927, it was mostly vacated. Through fundraising and several business ventures, the Masonic lodge was able to begin construction on a brick second story to house their lodge by 1928. After completing the second story the Masons began renovating the first floor, dividing it into three separate stores.

== Construction ==
The original building, constructed by T. E. Pollock, was built using local stone that was used in many of the buildings in Flagstaff and Williams Arizona. The main purpose behind using primarily stone in large buildings was the tendency for fires in this region. Nearly ever city in Northern Arizona experienced devastating fires that often destroyed entire towns. But with the use of stone as the primary construction material of new buildings, this hazard became of little concern.

Like many buildings of this era, it expressed a Romanesque art style with ornately carved, arched doorways, and round head windows along the side of the building. The lower story was constructed with local stone because of its abundance. The second story added in 1927 is made up of much lighter brick to ensure the building's stability. This upper section had the sole purpose of housing the Williams Masonic Lodge while the bottom floor continued as a place of business.

== Gallery ==
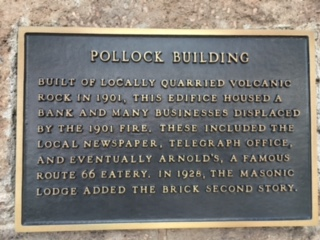
Pollock Building historical marker

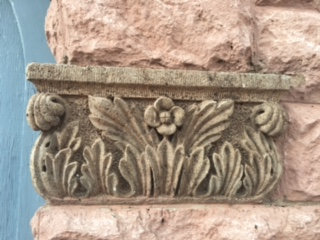
Carved archways on the front of the building

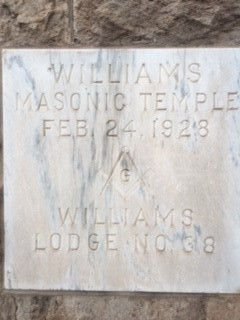
Cornerstone of the Williams Masonic Lodge
