= H.A. Clark Memorial Field =

Airfield in Williams, Coconino County, Arizona

- IATA: none; ICAO: KCMR; FAA LID: CMR

Summary
- Airport type: Public
- Location: Williams, Arizona
- Elevation AMSL: 6,691 ft (2,039 m)
- Coordinates: 35°18′19.7″N 112°11′39.8″W

Map
- Location within Arizona Location within the United States

Runways
Direction	Length		Surface
Direction	ft	m	Surface
18/36	6,003	1,830	Asphalt
- Source: Federal Aviation Administration

H.A. Clark Memorial Field (ICAO: KCMR, FAA LID: CMR) is a public-use airport located in Williams, Arizona. The Federal Aviation Administration location identifier (LID) used to be P32.

== Facilities and aircraft ==
H.A. Clark Memorial Field covers an area of 303 acres (123 ha) at an elevation of 6,691 feet (2,039 m) above mean sea level. It has one runway:

- 18/36 is 6,003 by 100 feet (1,830 x 30 m) with an asphalt surface.

For the 12-month period ending May 11, 2022 the airport had 16,110 aircraft operations, an average of 44 per day: 92% general aviation, 7% air taxi, and <1% military. At that time there were 2 aircraft based at this airport: both single-engine.

== Accidents and incidents ==
- On April 18, 2021, a 1946 Cessna 140, flying from Vista, California, crashed near the airport, killing the two occupants, 37 year old Timothy Michael Gill and 38 year old Joylani Roseann Kamalu. A later report said the airplane was coming from Sedona Airport in Sedona, Arizona, instead.

== See also ==
- List of airports in Arizona
