= Urban Route 66, Williams =

Historic area in Arizona, US

- U.S. National Register of Historic Places
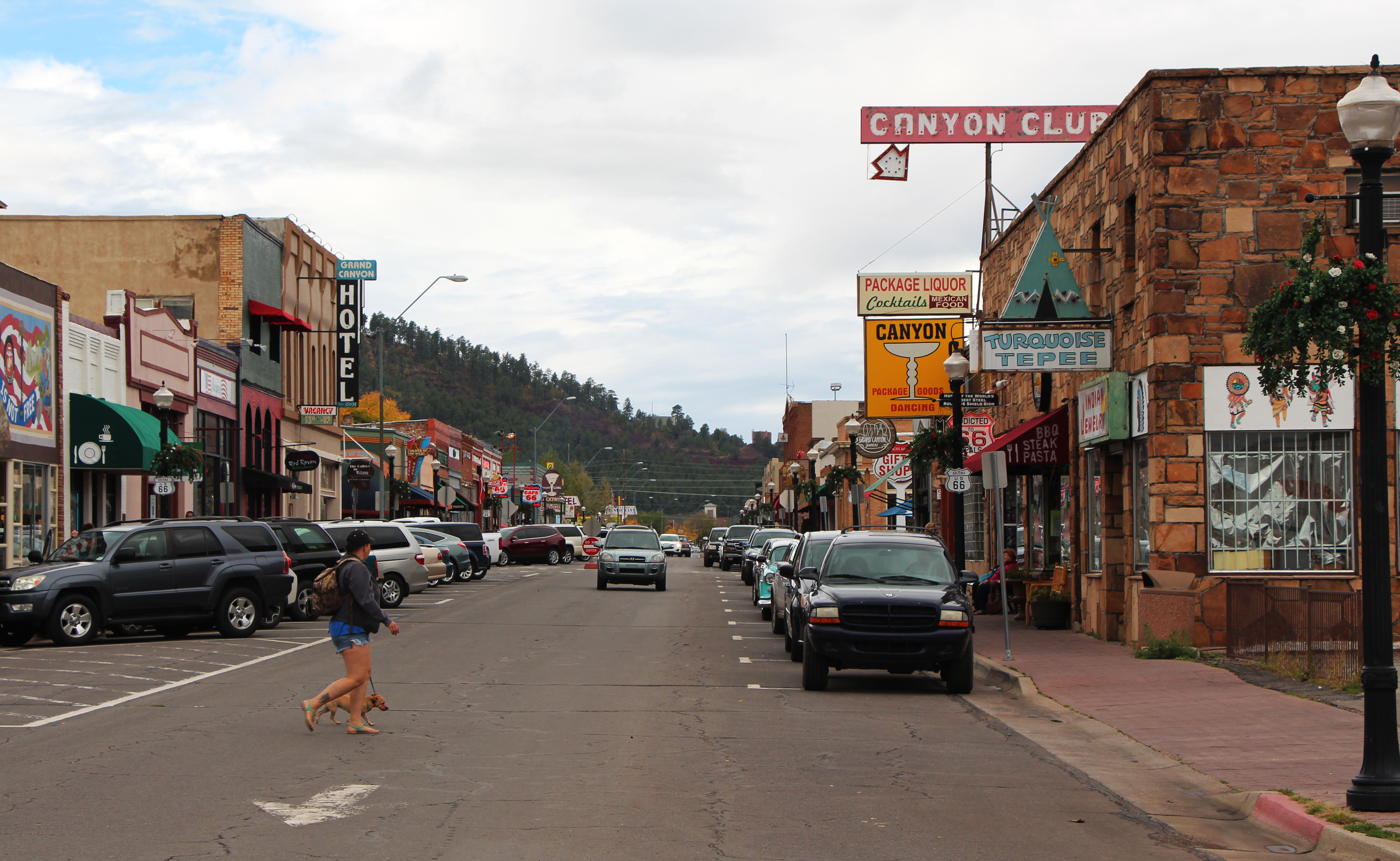

- Location within Arizona Location within the United States
- Location: Bill Williams Ave. between Sixth St. and Pine St., Williams, Arizona
- Coordinates: 35°14′56″N 112°11′31″W
- Area: 3.2 acres (1.3 ha)
- MPS: Historic US Route 66 in Arizona MPS
- NRHP reference No.: 89000376
- Added to NRHP: May 19, 1989

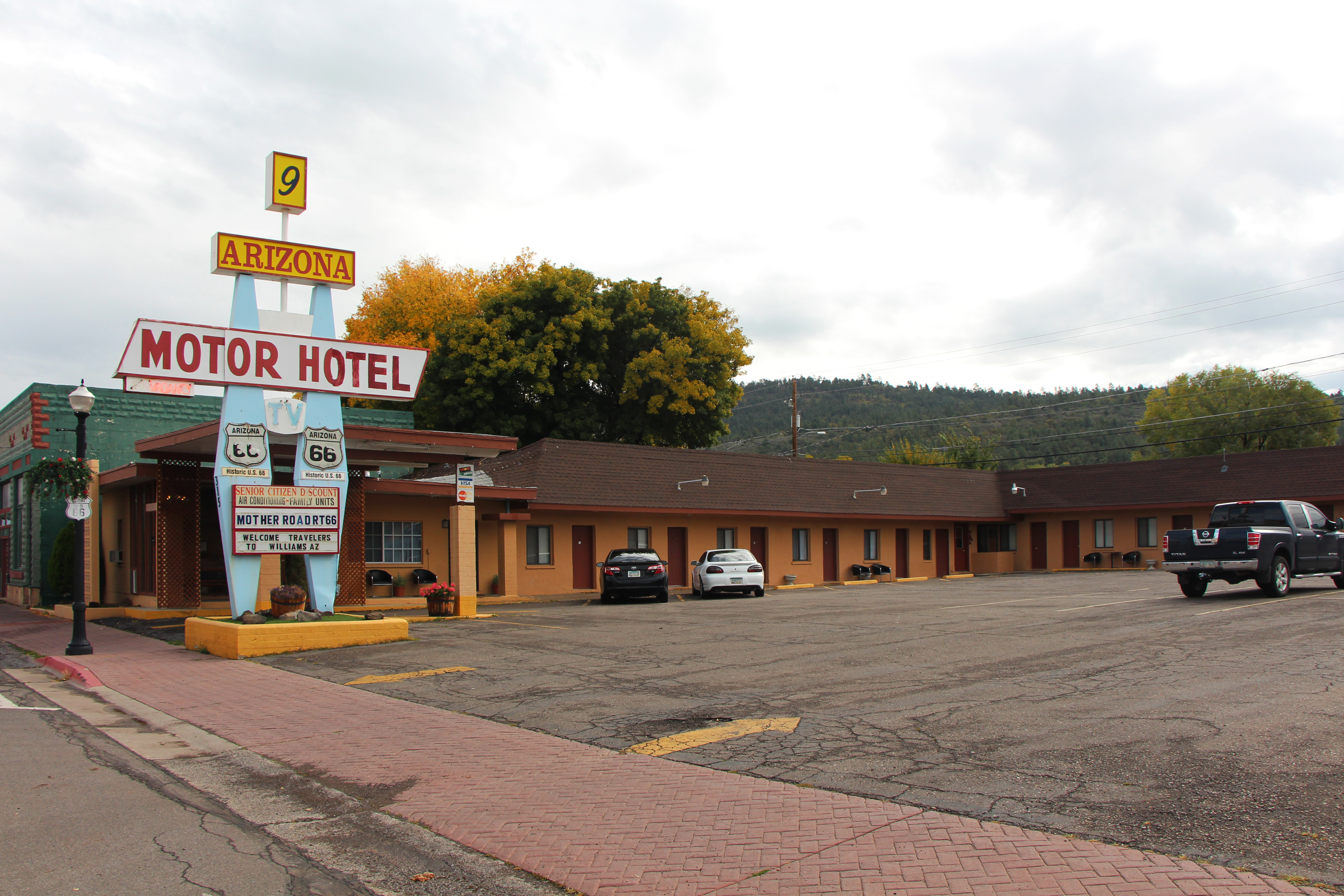
Motor Hotel, southeast corner of 4th and U.S. Route 66

U.S. Route 66 through Williams, Arizona began as a dirt street in the center of town which was later cindered and then paved. Despite some modern encroachments, most of U.S. Route 66 through Williams is lined with properties dating from the historic period. The four block long Williams Historic Business District was listed on the National Register of Historic Places on December 20, 1984.

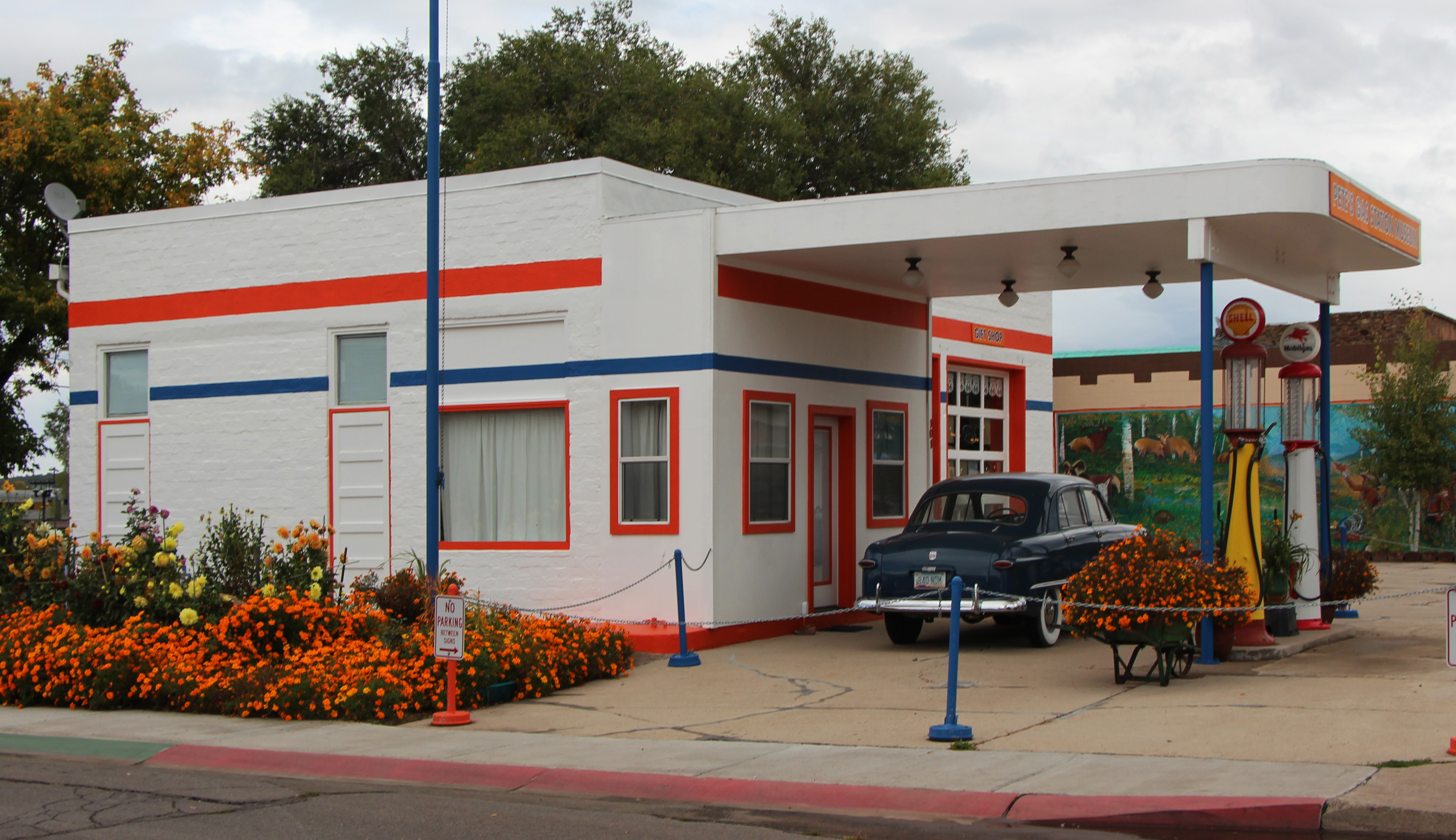
Vintage Gas Station, northeast corner of 1st St. and U.S. Route 66

It is flanked on the east and west by a commercial strip with motels, service stations, and restaurants dating to the 1920s, 1930s, and 1940s. One block of this commercial strip is west of the business district, and four blocks are to the east. The distribution and construction dates of these associated properties in Williams are directly related to construction of U.S. Route 66.

Unlike many stretches of U.S. Route 66 today, it is a good example of what the highway "looked like" during its heyday.

Williams continues to cater to the tourist trade, although Interstate 40 bypassed Route 66 on October 13, 1984.

Notable buildings Along Bill Williams Avenue
Name	Year Built	Architectural Style	Comments
Rock Building Rock Building, 326 W. Route 66	1936		
Babbitt-Polson Building Babbitt-Polson Building, 314 W. Route 66	1907	Only Art Deco style building in Historic District	Originally five smaller buildings combined and covered with stucco; housed grocery, hardware, department stores and bakery
Bennett's Auto Bennett's Auto, 239 W. Route 66	1930's	Modern Style	Gas station during heyday of Route 66 when gas sold for $0.16/gallon
The Postal Telegraph Co. The Postal Telegraph Co., 239 W. Route 66	1910		Operated until 1940's
Unknown named original building Unknown Building, 229 Route 66	ca. 1910		
Rittenhouse Haberdashery Rittenhouse Haberdashery, 225 W. Route 66	ca. 1910		Was a men's clothing store for 60+ years
Grand Canyon Drug Company Grand Canyon Drug Company, 221 W. Route 66	ca. 1912		Pharmacy and soda fountain in front, doctor's office in rear
Old Parlor Pool Hall Old Parlor Pool Hall, 217 W. Route 66	ca. 1910		
Lebsch Confectiionery Lebesch Confectionery, 213 W. Route 66	ca. 1914		
Dime Store Dime Store, 209 W. Route 66	ca. 1912		
Duffy Brother's Grocery Duffy Brother's Grocery Store, 201 W. Route 66	1912		Originally a bank, mostly grocery store, also a dime store. Original tin ceiling
Citizens Bank Citizen Bank, 202 W. Route 66	1918	Neoclassical revival	Financial center of lumber, ranching, and railroad operations; closed in 1958
Sultana Theatre Sultana Theatre, 301 W. Route 66	1912		Saloon, billiard hall, silent movie theatre; liquor and gambling during prohibition; first "talkie" in Northern Arizona shown in 1930
Pollock Building Pollock Building, 104 N. 3rd Street, Williams, AZ	First floor constructed after 1901 fire; 2nd floor 1927	"Rusticated" Romanesque Revival	Originally bank, has been newspaper, telephone/telegraph office. Constructed of locally quarried dacite; 2nd story brick
Grand Canyon Hotel Grand Canyon Hotel, 145 W. Route 66	1892	Victorian Commercial style	Has survived several fires; the ground floor has served as a drug store, grocery store, dance hall, curio shop, and a meeting hall for Knights of Pythias Lodge
Unknown originally named building Unknown Named Building, 135 W. Route 66	1907		
Old Post Office Old Post Office, 132 W. Route 66	ca 1907		
General Store General Store, 129 W. Route 66	1907		
Adams Grocery Adams Grocery, 125 W. Route 66	ca. 1907		
Bowden Building Bowden Building, 114 W. Route 66	1947		Flagstones quarried from "Flagstone Capital of the World", 18 miles west of Williams; built during the post-WWII migration to California
