= Dogtown Reservoir =

Lake in Coconino County, Arizona

- Location within Arizona
- Location: Coconino County, Arizona, United States
- Coordinates: 35°12′15″N 112°7′31″W
- Type: Reservoir
- Basin countries: United States
- Surface area: 50 acres (20 ha)
- Average depth: 15 ft (4.6 m)
- Surface elevation: 7,070 ft (2,150 m)

Dogtown Reservoir is located near Williams in North Central Arizona, United States. Recreational facilities at the reservoir are maintained under the authority of the Kaibab National Forest.

== Fish species ==
- Rainbow Trout
- Brown Trout
- Largemouth Bass
- Crappie
- Sunfish
- Catfish (Channel)
