= American Frontiers: A Public Lands Journey =

US advertising campaign

American Frontiers: A Public Lands Journey was a non-profit publicity project executed from July to September 2002 which was intended to raise awareness about public lands in the United States. It involved teams of travelers making their way across the United States, from Mexico to Canada, traversing exclusively public lands and avoiding private estates.

== Background ==
In 2002, the non-profit Public Lands Interpretive Association (PLIA) partnered with the National Geographic Society, federal and state land management agencies, private businesses, and other organizations in an attempt to focus national attention on American public estate by highlighting the experiences of two groups of travelers who followed a route from Mexico to Canada that stayed on public lands the entire way - "the first ever made entirely on public lands". This project, known as American Frontiers: A Public Lands Journey, aimed to create broad national exposure about the role and relevance of public lands.

== Trek ==
On July 31, 2002, two teams of travelers started simultaneously from the Mexican and Canadian borders in New Mexico and Montana. During the next two months, they travelled more than 2,600 miles and crossed six states, entirely on public lands.

The trekkers travelled using various modes of transportation, including foot, horseback, mountain bikes, ATVs, off-road motorcycles, canoes, whitewater rafts, motorboats, and four-wheel-drive vehicles.

The teams met sixty days later on National Public Lands Day in the Uinta-Wasatch-Cache National Forest near Salt Lake City, Utah.

== Teams ==
The North Team left from the Canada–US border in Waterton-Glacier International Peace Park, Montana, and travelled south toward Salt Lake City, Utah.

North Team trekkers
Name	Trek duties	Home state
Michael Murphy	National Geographic Society (NGS) teacher	California
Roberto Carlo	Trekker	New York
Dana Bell	Trekker	California
Charlotte Talley Stutz	Trekker	South Carolina

North Support Team
Name	Trek duties	Home state
Charlie Thorpe	Team leader	Alabama
Robert Ashley	Education outreach coordinator / NGS teacher alternate	Illinois
Bob Van Deven	Media & special events coordinator / 1st alternate	Arizona
Stephen Braunlich	General logistics	Virginia
Cheryl Fusco	Route logistics / supply & equipment manager	Florida
Sidna Small	Food and beverage manager	Kansas
Paul Bucca	Food and beverage manager	Alabama
Ravinda Gupta	Medical support	North Carolina
Michelle Wiliams	Medical support	New York

The South Team left from the Mexico–US border west of Las Cruces, New Mexico, and travelled north to Salt Lake City, Utah.

South Team trekkers
Name	Trek duties	Home state
Catherine Kiffe	National Geographic Society teacher	Louisiana
Jan Nesset	Trekker	Montana
Richard Tyrrell	Trekker	Pennsylvania
Julie Overbaugh	Trekker	Alaska

South Support Team
Name	Trek duties	Home state
Bob Hammond	Team leader	Washington, DC
Kay Gandy	Education outreach coordinator / NGS teacher alternate	Louisiana
Jessica Terrell	PR/media & special events coordinator / 1st alternate	Missouri
Jacob McLeod	General logistics / 2nd alternate	Florida
Rob Monnig	Route logistics / supply & equipment manager	Kentucky
Sam Altman	Food and beverage manager	Kentucky
Lorie McGraw	Technical support	South Carolina
Vipul Lakhami	Medical support	North Carolina

== Education ==
American Frontiers attempted to present a balanced view of America's public lands – their history and their uses – engaging the two teams in special public land showcase events, round table discussions, backcountry classrooms, and en route visits to schools and communities. Trek updates were shown on the television show National Geographic Today and through daily postings by team members on the American Frontiers website.

=== Trek events ===
Both teams took part in events along their trek. These events were hosted by US Fish & Wildlife, US Forest Service, Bureau of Land Management, US Geological Survey, and others.

The North Team's events included a tour of the OCI Trona Mine near Green River, Wyoming; attending a wild horse and burro adoption event in Jackson, Wyoming; and paddling across Clark Canyon Reservoir in a dugout canoe, following the route of the Lewis and Clark Expedition.

The South Team's events included a Wilderness Roundtable discussion in Silver City, New Mexico, about the importance of the Gila Wilderness in the lives of surrounding communities; a discussion about ATV use in the Fishlake National Forest in Utah; and a presentation on condor reintroduction in the Kaibab National Forest.

=== Geography Action! 2002 ===
American Frontiers: A Public Lands Journey inspired the National Geographic Society's Geography Action! 2002 curriculum, aimed at school-aged children.
