= Williams Historic Business District =

Historic district in Arizona, United States

- U.S. National Register of Historic Places
- U.S. Historic district
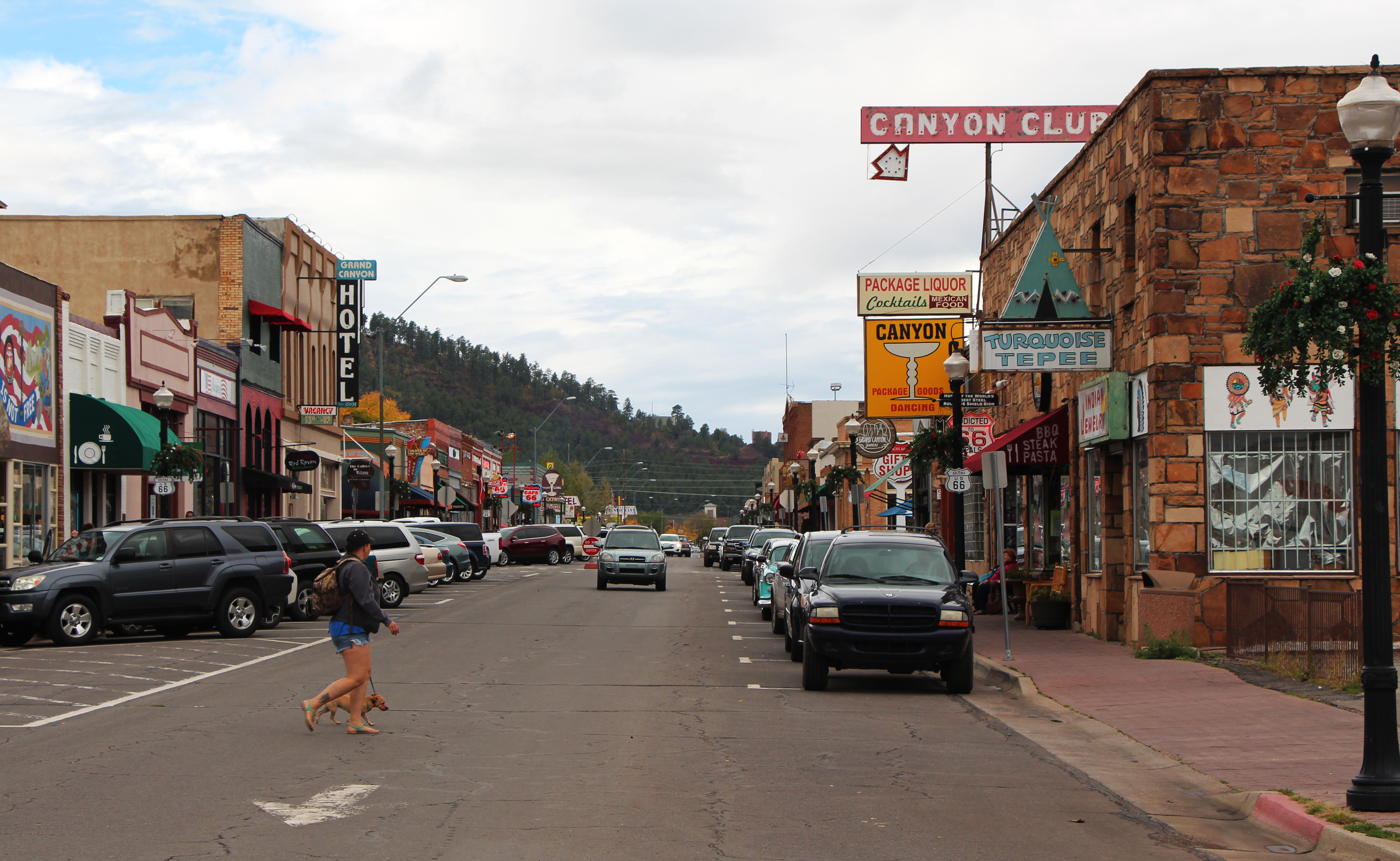
- Looking west from 1st Street, down Route 66, Williams, AZ

- Location within Arizona Location within the United States
- Location: Roughly bounded by Grant and Railroad Aves., and 1st and 4th Sts., Williams, Arizona
- Coordinates: 35.2505°N 112.18839°W
- Area: 25 acres (10 ha)
- Built: 1890
- Architect: Multiple
- Architectural style: Romanesque, Victorian Commercial
- NRHP reference No.: 84000436
- Added to NRHP: December 20, 1984

The Williams Historic Business District is significant for its long time close association with the American development of tourism, which in turn became a principal local industry. The reasons for this were that the District straddled the Atchison, Topeka and Santa Fe Railway (now the Southwest Chief) and U.S. Highway 66, two significant national transportation arteries, as well as being at the southern terminus of both rail and highway links to the Grand Canyon. The District is also historically significant because of the role it played in the cycles of opening of the frontier west, from ranching to railroading and lumbering.

The Urban Route 66, Williams was listed on the National Register of Historic places May 19, 1989.

The Williams Historic Business District is architecturally significant because it contains within its boundaries an important selection of late 19th and early 20th Century vernacular architecture.

All of the buildings are two-story or less; most are single-story. Several of the buildings constitute examples of a particular architectural style: the Fray Marcos Hotel with its Renaissance Revival characteristics; the Cabinet Saloon and the Pollock Building made of native dacite as examples of Romanesque Revival, and the Tetzlaff Building, a yellow brick interpretation of Victorian Romanesque.

The boundaries of the District form an irregular area generally bounded by 4th St. on the west, 1st street on east, Grant Ave. on the south, and the Fray Marcos Hotel on the north. It lies in the center of the City of Williams and also includes the businesses associated with the Atchison, Topeka and Santa Fe Railway; U.S. Route 66 runs down the center of the District as Bill Williams Avenue.

== Notable buildings ==
Name	Year Built	Architectural Style	Comments
Fray Marcos Hotel Fray Marcos Hotel, 235 N. Grand Canyon Blvd, Williams, AZ	1908	Renaissance Revival	The Fray Marcos Hotel is one of the most historically significant buildings in the District because of its long term status as a "Harvey House" and its association with the Santa Fe Railway Co. on its main east-west line to California. It also served the passenger railway business during its heyday when the Grand Canyon was a prime attraction and travel was by rail. Its initial construction began in 1901 when a small curio shop was erected. It was added to for the next 20 years producing one of the few good examples of Renaissance Revival buildings in Arizona
Babbitt-Polson Warehouse Babbitt-Polson Warehouse, NW of Visitors Center, Williams, AZ	Late 1890s		Grain, coal and hardware delivered by Santa Fe Railroad stored here
Rock Building Rock Building, 326 W. Route 66, Williams, AZ	1936		
Babbitt-Polson Building Babbitt-Polson Building, 314 W. Route 66, Williams, AZ	1907	Only Art Deco style building in Historic District	Originally five smaller buildings combined and covered with stucco; housed grocery, hardware, department stores and bakery
Bennett's Auto Bennett's Auto, 239 W. Route 66, Williams, AZ	1930's	Modern Style	Gas station during heyday of Route 66 when gas sold for $0.16/gallon
The Postal Telegraph Co. The Postal Telegraph Co., 239 W. Route 66, Williams, AZ	1910		Operated until 1940's
Unknown named original building Unknown Building, 229 Route 66, Williams, AZ	ca. 1910		
Rittenhouse Haberdashery Rittenhouse Haberdashery, 225 W. Route 66, Williams, AZ	ca. 1910		Was a men's clothing store for 60+ years
Grand Canyon Drug Company Grand Canyon Drug Company, 221 W. Route 66, Williams, AZ	ca. 1912		Pharmacy and soda fountain in front, doctor's office in rear
Old Parlor Pool Hall Old Parlor Pool Hall, 217 W. Route 66, Williams, AZ	ca. 1910		
Lebsch Confectiionery Lebesch Confectionery, 213 W. Route 66, Williams, AZ	ca. 1914		
Dime Store Dime Store, 209 W. Route 66, Williams, AZ	ca. 1912		
Duffy Brother's Grocery Duffy Brother's Grocery Store, 201 W. Route 66, Williams, AZ	1912		Originally a bank, mostly grocery store, also a dime store. Original tin ceiling
Citizens Bank Citizen Bank, 202 W. Route 66, Williams, AZ	1918	Neoclassical revival	Financial center of lumber, ranching, and railroad operations; closed in 1958
Sultana Theatre Sultana Theatre, 301 W. Route 66, Williams, AZ	1912		Saloon, billiard hall, silent movie theatre; liquor and gambling during prohibition; first "talkie" in Northern Arizona shown in 1930
Pollock Building Pollock Building, 104 N. 3rd Street, Williams, AZ	First floor constructed after 1901 fire; 2nd floor 1927	"Rusticated" Romanesque Revival	Originally bank, has been newspaper, telephone/telegraph office. Constructed of locally quarried dacite; 2nd story brick
Grand Canyon Hotel Grand Canyon Hotel, 145 W. Route 66, Williams, AZ	1912	Victorian Commercial style	Has survived several fires; the ground floor has served as a drug store, grocery store, dance hall, curio shop, and a meeting hall for Knights of Pythias Lodge
Unknown originally named building Unknown Named Building, 135 W. Route 66, Williams, AZ	1907		
Old Post Office Old Post Office, 132 W. Route 66, Williams, AZ	ca 1907		
General Store General Store, 129 W. Route 66, Williams, AZ	1907		
Adams Grocery Adams Grocery, 125 W. Route 66, Williams, AZ	ca. 1907		
Bowden Building Bowden Building, 114 W. Route 66, Williams, AZ	1947		Flagstones quarried from "Flagstone Capital of the World", 18 miles west of Williams; built during the post-WWII migration to California
Whiskey Alley Saloon Whiskey Alley Saloon, 109 W. Railroad Ave., Williams, AZ	ca. 1910	Victorian Commercial style	One of the oldest buildings along Railroad Ave.; originally two stories, with top floor a hotel; In the 1920s was known as the "Maggie Torrez Mexican Food Restaurant."
Tetzlaff Building Tetzlaff Building, 137 W. Railroad Ave., Williams, Az	ca, 1897	Victorian Romanesque	Originally a saloon and bordello; 8 rooms for prostitutes, had an elegant parlor, and a 2-story outhouse. Had whisky, pool, and poker tables on ground floor. Chinese restaurant, opium den at the back of the building. Its brick construction credited with stopping fires in 1901 and 1903 that burned down "Saloon Row", or this stretch of Railroad Ave
The Cabinet Saloon The Cabinet Saloon, 141 W. Railroad Ave., Williams, Az	ca. 1893	Romanesque Revival style	One of the oldest buildings in Williams; advertised as "Leading Sporting Resort in Williams"; survived several fires due to stone construction; was used as a bar scene in the 1988 movie Midnight Run
Red Cross Garage Red Cross Garage, 221 W. Railroad Ave., Williams, Az	ca. 1913		Served travelers—both wagons and cars; the opposite end of the building was a bowling alley
