= Kaibab Lake =

Lake in Coconino County, Arizona

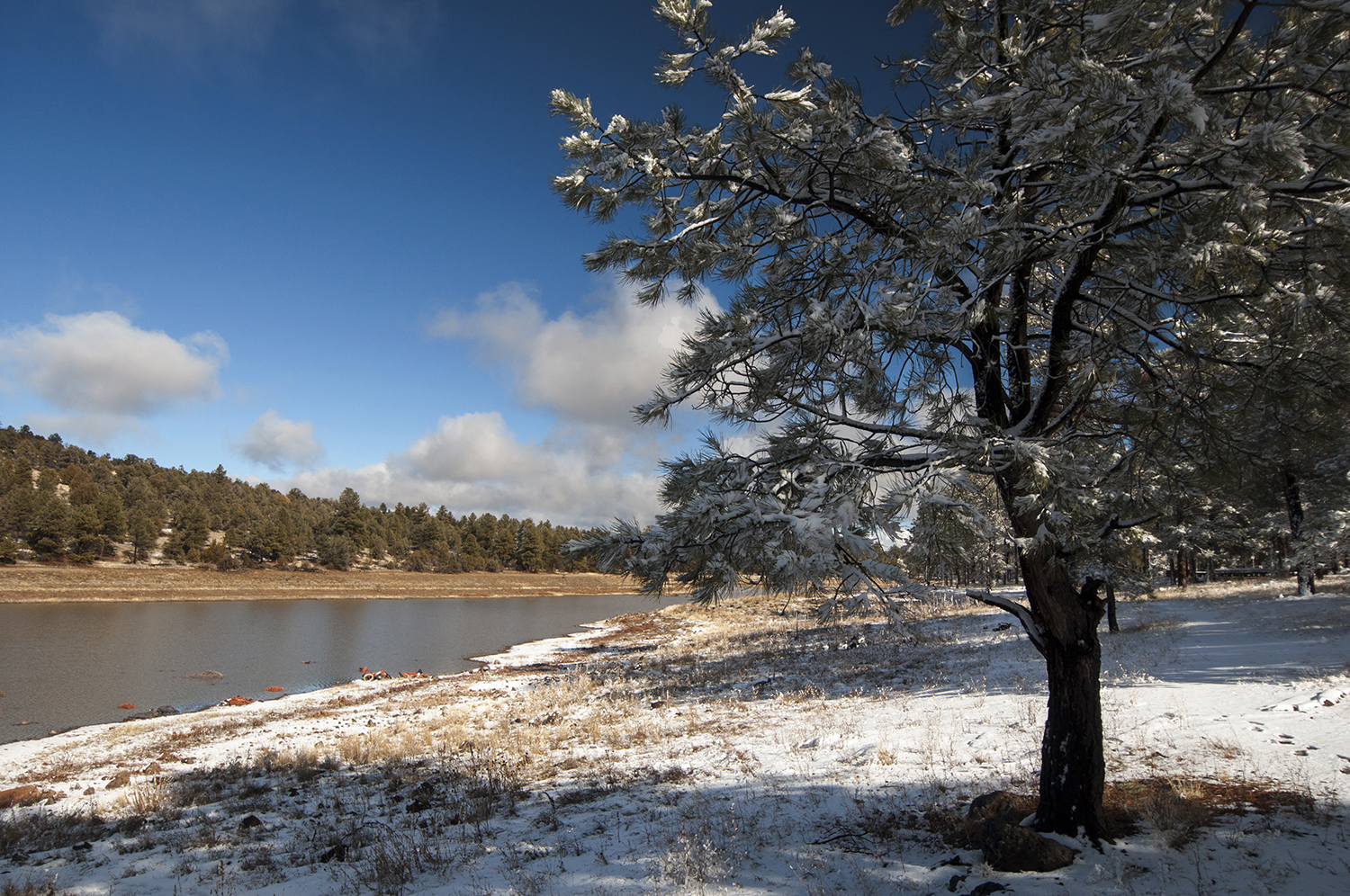
- Kaibab Lake in the winter

- Location within Arizona Location within the United States
- Location: Coconino County, Arizona, United States
- Coordinates: 35.2850°N 112.1545°W
- Type: reservoir
- Basin countries: United States
- Max. length: 1.03 mi (1.66 km)
- Max. width: 0.22 mi (0.35 km)
- Surface area: 45 acres (18 ha)
- Average depth: 37 ft (11 m)
- Surface elevation: 6,790 ft (2,070 m)

Kaibab Lake is located about 4 mi (6.4 km) northeast of Williams in North Central Arizona. Camping is permitted at the campgrounds managed by the Public Lands Interpretive Association.

== Fish species ==
- Rainbow Trout
- Largemouth Bass
- Sunfish
- Catfish (Channel)
- Black crappie
- Bluegill
