= Cooperating association =

Type of auxiliary organization

A cooperating association, also known as an interpretive association or a natural history association, supports the interpretive, educational and scientific programs and services of a governmental land management agency such as the National Park Service, USDA Forest Service, US Fish and Wildlife Service, Bureau of Land Management, US Army Corps of Engineers, or state park departments.

Associations assist in the production of site-specific products, distribute educational and scientific publications produced by agencies, donate materials for use in interpretive programs and exhibits, and work to secure grants and funding. This is accomplished through bookstore sales, membership support, publication and product development, research funding, and other educational programs and activities. They must hold a federally tax-exempt, not-for-profit status under Section 501(c)(3) of the Internal Revenue Code.

== Purpose ==
The primary purpose of cooperating associations is to support the educational, scientific, historical, and interpretive activities of the National Park Service, primarily through the retail sale of educational products and services to national park visitors.

== History ==
After the founding of the National Park Service in 1916 several non-profit organizations were formed to support educational and interpretive programs and projects not covered by government funding, the first being the Yosemite Association which was formed in 1923. Several similar nonprofit organizations became known as cooperating associations by 1936, and were formally recognized by Congress in 1946 (Public Law 79-633).

== Types of cooperating associations ==
Types of cooperating associations
Type	Example
Single location and single government agency	Merritt Island Nature Association and the US Fish & Wildlife Service
Multiple locations and single Government agency	Western National Parks Association and the National Park Service
Multiple locations and multiple government agencies	Public Lands Interpretive Association and the Forest Service, Bureau of Land Management, US Fish & Wildlife Services

== Authorization and affiliation ==
=== National Park Service ===
Within the National Park Service, authority to designate or affiliate with a cooperating association is assigned to the regional directors and cannot be re-delegated. In the case of organizations serving multiple regions, which includes Eastern National and Western National Parks Association, the Director of the National Park Service signs the agreements. In the fiscal year 2008, 71 associations operated more than 100 outlets in 325 units of the National Park Service.

=== The USDA Forest Service ===
Within the Forest Service, authority is assumed to lie with the regional foresters, but may be re-delegated to forest supervisors for single site agreements. The Forest Service currently works with 24 cooperating associations.

=== The Bureau of Land Management ===
Within the Bureau of Land Management, authority to designate or affiliate with a cooperating association is assigned to the state director but can be re-delegated to district managers. As of 2010, the Bureau of Land Management works with 21 cooperating associations in all twelve western states.

=== US Fish and Wildlife Service ===
Within the US Fish and Wildlife Service, authority is assumed to lie with the regional director but may be re-delegated to refuge managers for single site agreements. The United States Fish and Wildlife Service currently holds agreements with 8 cooperating associations.

=== US Army Corps of Engineers ===
The US Army Corps of Engineers currently works with 3 cooperating agreements. Authority is held by the Commanding General and Chief of Engineers.

=== Other cooperating association partners ===
- Municipal agencies
- National Scenic Byways
- United States Bureau of Reclamation
- State parks
- U.S Geological Survey
- Other qualified not-for-profit organizations

=== Friends groups ===
Friends groups are non-profit organizations that partner with public lands agencies to accomplish activities that typically benefit a specific park or public lands area. While some friends groups also function as cooperating associations, the two terms are not interchangeable, as the authority to operate interpretive sales outlets on public lands is governed by specific agreements and authorities.
