= Public Lands Interpretive Association =

Public Lands Interpretive Association (PLIA) is a cooperating (or interpretive) association whose mission is to “inspire and educate the public about the natural and cultural heritage resources of America’s public lands.” PLIA operates https://www.publiclands.org where maps can be purchased and an interactive recreation map can be accessed to find public lands sites. PLIA provides those wanting to visit public lands with information and educational materials such as up-to-date fire news and alerts, and an online map center with Bureau of Land Management, Forest Service, and other maps helpful to users of public lands.

PLIA is one of more than hundred 501c(3) not-for-profit interpretive associations which support public land agencies throughout the United States. The national umbrella organization of interpretive associations is the Public Lands Alliance.

== History ==
PLIA (formerly Southwest Natural and Cultural Heritage Association) was formed in 1981, and is affiliated with the USDA Forest Service and the Bureau of Land Management.

Revenues are derived from PLIA sales outlets, a campground concession, publishing and product development, online sales, donations. Net revenues support PLIA’s interpretive and educational efforts.

== Sales Outlets and Areas Managed by PLIA ==
=== Arizona ===
USDA Forest Service:

- Apache Sitgreaves NF:

- Clifton Ranger District Office, Clifton

- Coronado NF:

- Sabino Canyon Visitor Center, Tucson

- Palisades Visitor Center, Mt. Lemmon

- Sierra Vista Ranger District Office, Hereford

=== New Mexico ===
USDA Forest Service:

- Gila NF:

- Glenwood Ranger District Office, Glenwood

- Lincoln NF:

- Sacramento Ranger District Office, Cloudcroft

- Smokey Bear Ranger District Office, Ruidoso

Bureau of Land Management:

- Fort Craig Historic Site, Socorro
- New Mexico Public Lands Information Center, Santa Fe
- Rio Grande Gorge Visitor Center, Pilar
- Wild Rivers Recreation Area, Cerro

- Art Zimmerman Visitors Center

- Valley of Fires National Recreation Area, Carrizozo

- Valley of Fires National Recreation Area Visitor Center

== Campgrounds ==
Since 1991, PLIA has operated four campgrounds, doing business as Southwest Recreation, under a special use permit on the Williams Ranger District of the Kaibab National Forest near Williams, Arizona.

Campground locations:

- Kaibab Lake
- White Horse Lake
- Dogtown Lake

== American Frontiers: A Public Lands Journey ==
In 2002, PLIA mapped out a Canada-to-Mexico trek exclusively on public lands called American Frontiers: A Public Lands Journey. This was the first trek through the United States done entirely on public land.

== Publications ==
Publications
Date	Publication
2016	Field Guide to the Rio Grande del Norte National Monument
2015	Kaibab National Forest Campgrounds Brochure (Dogtown Lake, Kaibab Lake, Whitehorse Lake)
2012	Field Guide to Sabino Canyon
2010, 2013	Six New Mexico Recreational Maps
2009	Ducks at a Distance, 12th edition
2004, 2008	Trail Guide to Lincoln National Forest, 2nd Revised Edition
2001	Out and About in a Day: Outdoor Fun on Northern Utah’s Public Lands
1999	Wild and Scenic Rio Chama: River Guide
1999	Trail Guide to Lincoln National Forest
1998	Merritt Island National Wildlife Refuge
1997	Dolores River Guide
1997	Grand Staircase Escalante Visitor Map & Guide
1997	Wichita Mountains National Wildlife Refuge
1995	Trail Guide to Pecos Wilderness
1994	Wild and Scenic Rio Grande: River Guide
1994	Field Guide to Bosque del Apache National Wildlife Refuge
1994	Visitor Guide to Sandia Mountains
1994	The Escalante Community
1993	Sabino Canyon
1992	Visitor Guide to Coconino National Forest
1992	A Birder's Guide to the Aransas National Wildlife Refuge
1991	Visitor Guide to Mogollon Rim
1991	The Anasazi: Why Did They Leave? Where Did They Go?
1990	Visitor Guide to Kaibab National Forest (North)
1990	Visitor Guide to Kaibab National Forest (South)
1990	11,000 Years on Tonto National Forest
1988	From A to Z: The Biography of Arthur W. Zimmerman
1987	Heron Flats Trail Guide
