= Poozeum =

Coprolite museum in Williams, Arizona, U.S.

- Established: 2014
- Location: Williams, Arizona, US
- Coordinates: 35°15′04″N 112°11′16″W
- Type: Private museum
- Key holdings: Barnum
- Collection size: 8,000 coprolites
- Owner: George Frandsen
- Website: poozeum.com

The Poozeum is a museum in Williams, Arizona, United States, dedicated to coprolites (fossilized feces). It was founded in 2014 as a website and resource center by George Frandsen, who owns the world's largest collection of coprolites. Pieces from Frandsen's collection served as a traveling exhibition before the Poozeum opened its physical location in 2024.

The Poozeum includes 8,000 coprolites, including Barnum, the largest coprolite by a carnivore to have been discovered, a 9.28 kg (20.5 lb) specimen believed to be from a Tyrannosaurus rex.

== History ==
Poozeum founder George Frandsen began collecting coprolites as an 18-year-old, purchasing his first piece of fossilized feces from a rock and fossil store in Moab, Utah. He expanded his collection over the years, and by 2016 it included 1,277 specimens and was recognized as the largest collection of its kind in the world, earning it a Guinness World Record. By 2021, the collection had grown to 5,000 coprolites. To differentiate coprolites from rocks, Frandsen examines their shape, size, surface texture, contents/inclusions, location, and chemistry.

Frandsen was motivated to establish the Poozeum due to the lack of coprolite representation in museums. The Poozeum was established as an online gallery in 2014. Frandsen, then based in Florida, would also lend his coprolites to museums as a traveling exhibition. In 2024, Frandsen quit his corporate job, sold his house, and moved to Arizona to open a physical museum for the collection. The Poozeum opened in Williams, Arizona, along Route 66, on May 18, 2024.

== Operations ==
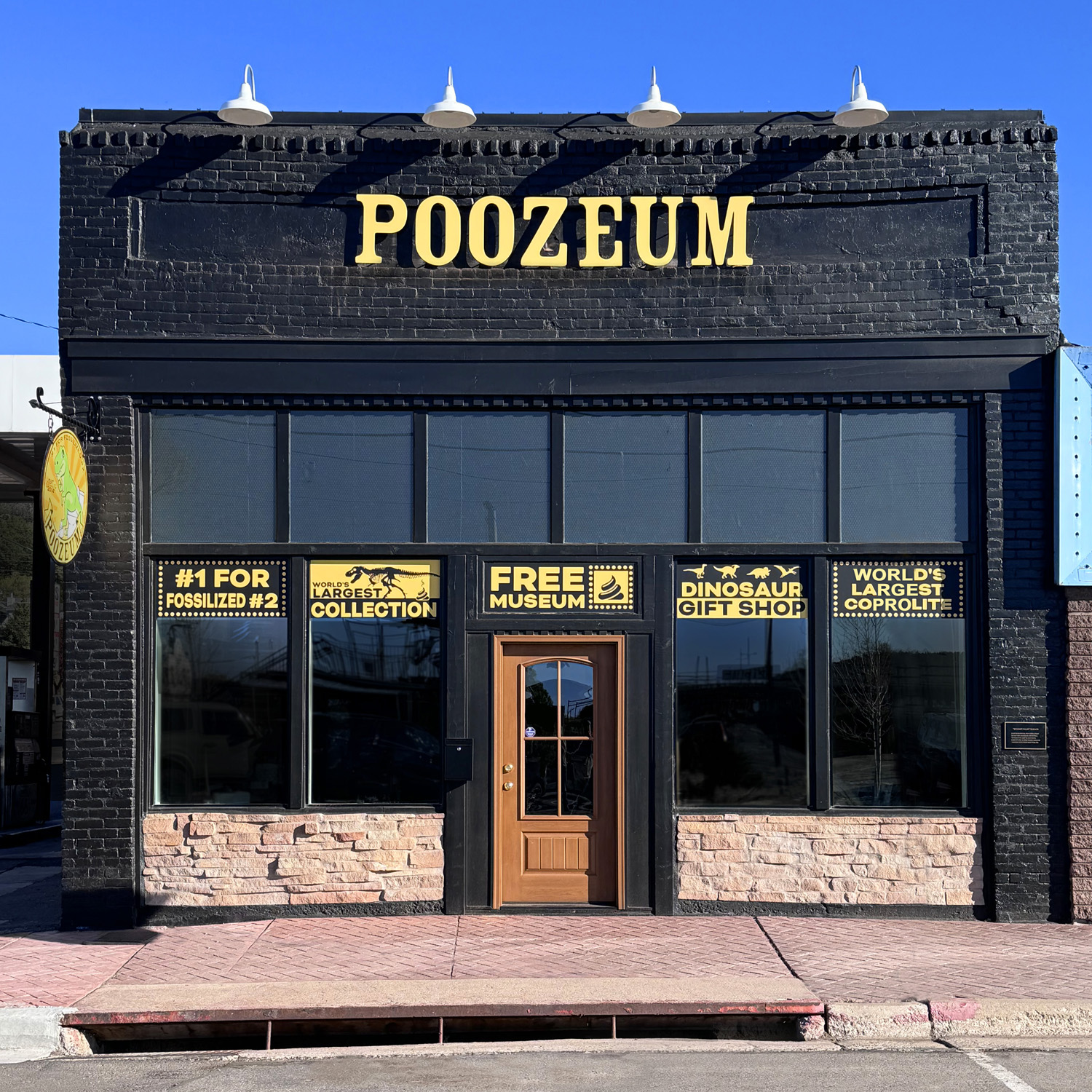
The Poozeum Museum & Gift Shop

It has the slogan, "#1 for fossilized #2", and bills itself as the "world's premier dinosaur poop museum and gift shop", selling dinosaur-themed merchandise. Entry to the museum is free to the public.

== Coprolite collection ==
The Poozeum holds Frandsen's collection, which as of 2024 numbers 8,000 coprolites. It includes coprolites dating from 10,000 years ago to 400 mya. The coprolites range in size from tiny pebble-sized specimens to a behemoth weighing over 9 kg (20 lb). The collection includes crocodilian coprolites as well as those from dinosaurs.

The museum includes a replica of Titanosaur poop, measuring 4 ft (1.2 m) in length. Aside from the collection of coprolites, the museum has a bronze statue of a Tyrannosaurus rex squatting on a toilet. The statue, named The Stinker, is a nod to Auguste Rodin's The Thinker.

=== Barnum, the largest carnivore coprolite ===
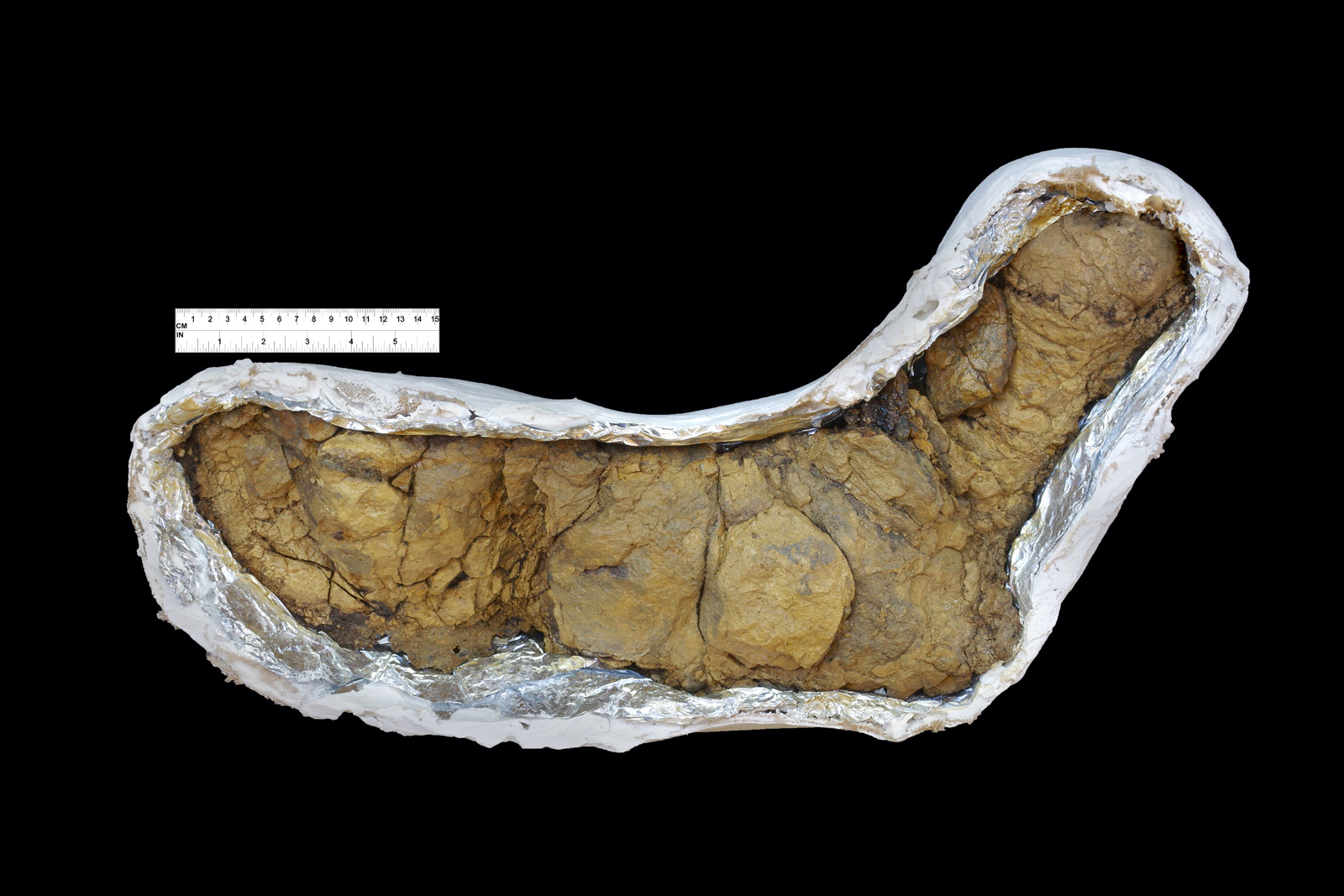
Barnum, believed to have been defecated by a Tyrannosaurus rex, is the largest known coprolite from a carnivore.

The coprolite Barnum is the largest known specimen from a carnivore. Dating from the Late Cretaceous, it is believed to have come from a Tyrannosaurus rex and was discovered in the Hell Creek Formation on a ranch near Buffalo, South Dakota. It was given the name Barnum for Barnum Brown, the paleontologist who originally discovered the T. rex, and for the American showman P. T. Barnum. The coprolite is 67.5 cm (26.6 in) long by 15.7 cm (6.2 in) wide and weighs 9.28 kg (20.5 lb). An analysis of the coprolite using X-ray fluorescence determined that significant quantities of calcium and phosphorus were present. Crushed bone inclusions were also found within the specimen. Barnum holds the Guinness World Record for being the "world's largest fossilized excrement from a carnivore".

=== Other coprolites ===
Frandsen purchased from an online vendor a coprolite found near Summerville, South Carolina, which displayed bite marks. The apparently unpalatable specimen was consistent with the shape and size of coprolites of crocodilians.

Precious, a 1.92 kg (4.2 lb) coprolite, is the largest true-to-form coprolite ever discovered.

== Gallery ==
Coprolites from the Poozeum
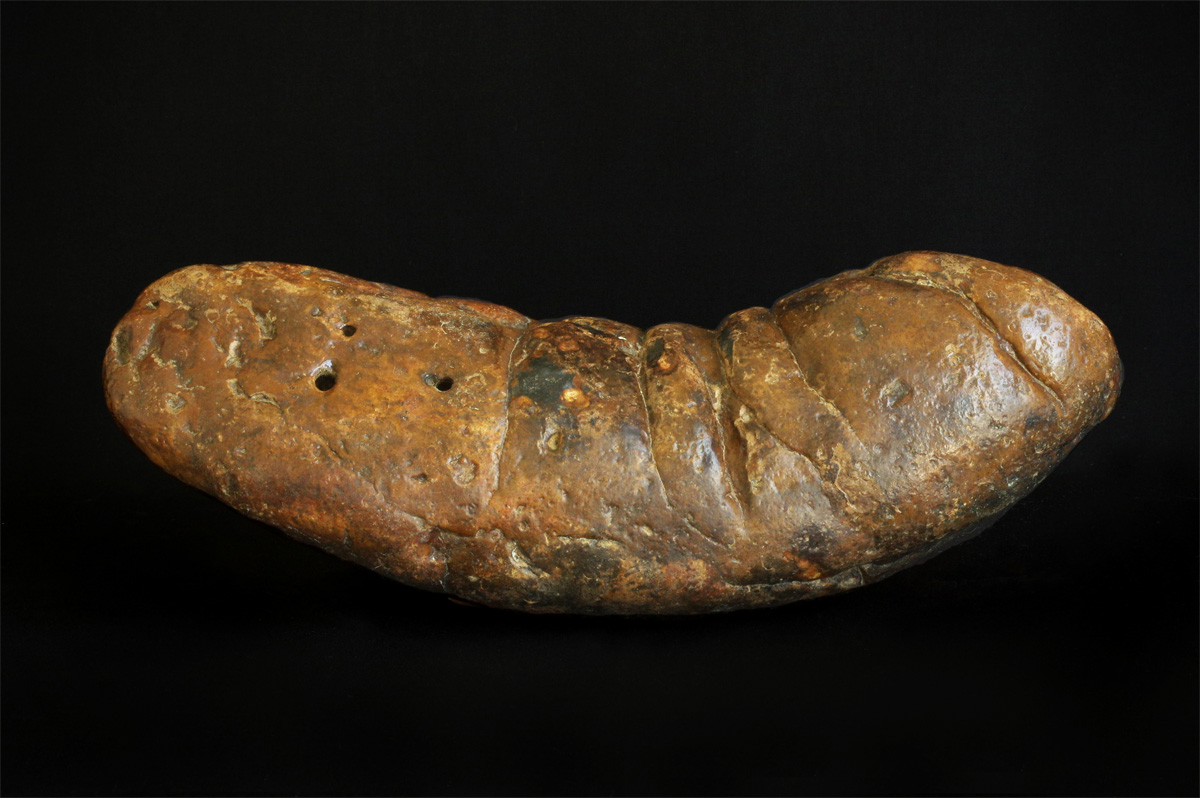
The Kraken, a coprolite from the Miocene weighing 1.056 kg (2.33 lb)

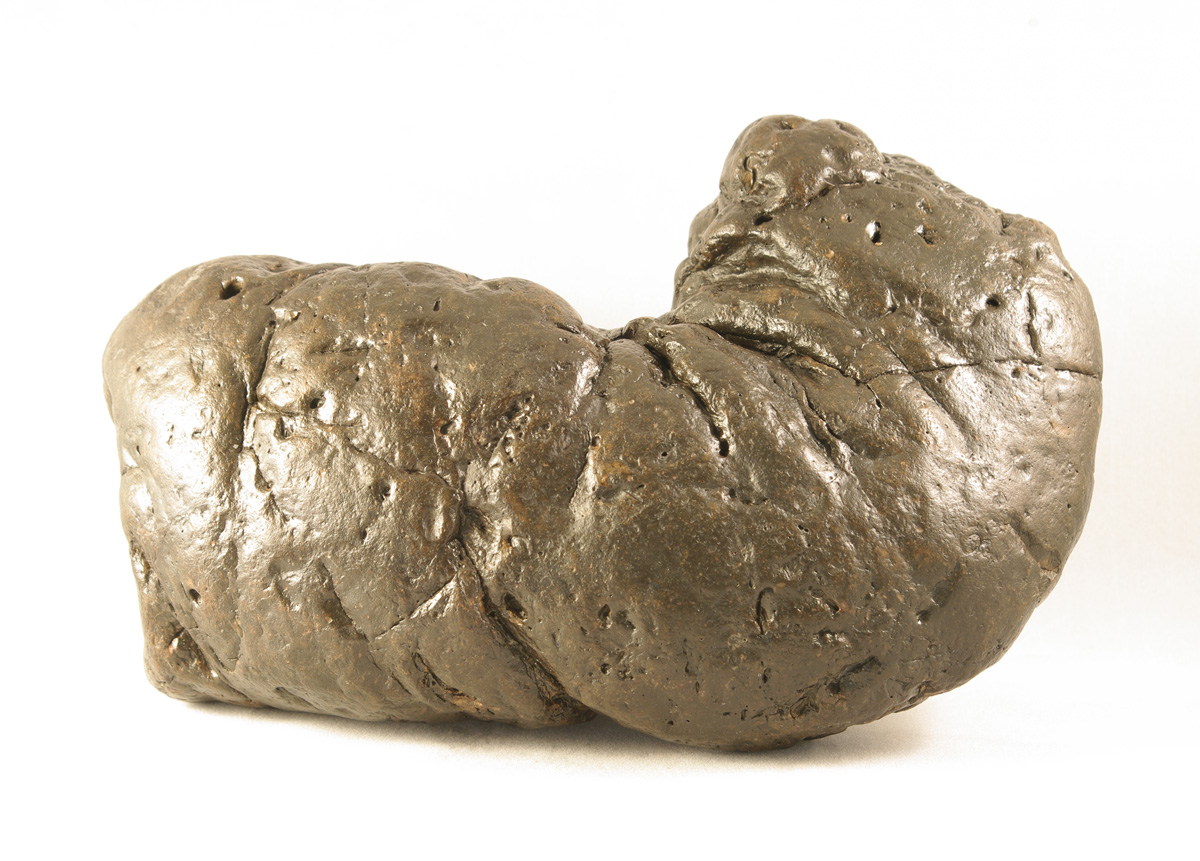
Precious, a 1.92 kg (4.2 lb) coprolite that would be over 254 mm (10.0 in) long were it unbent

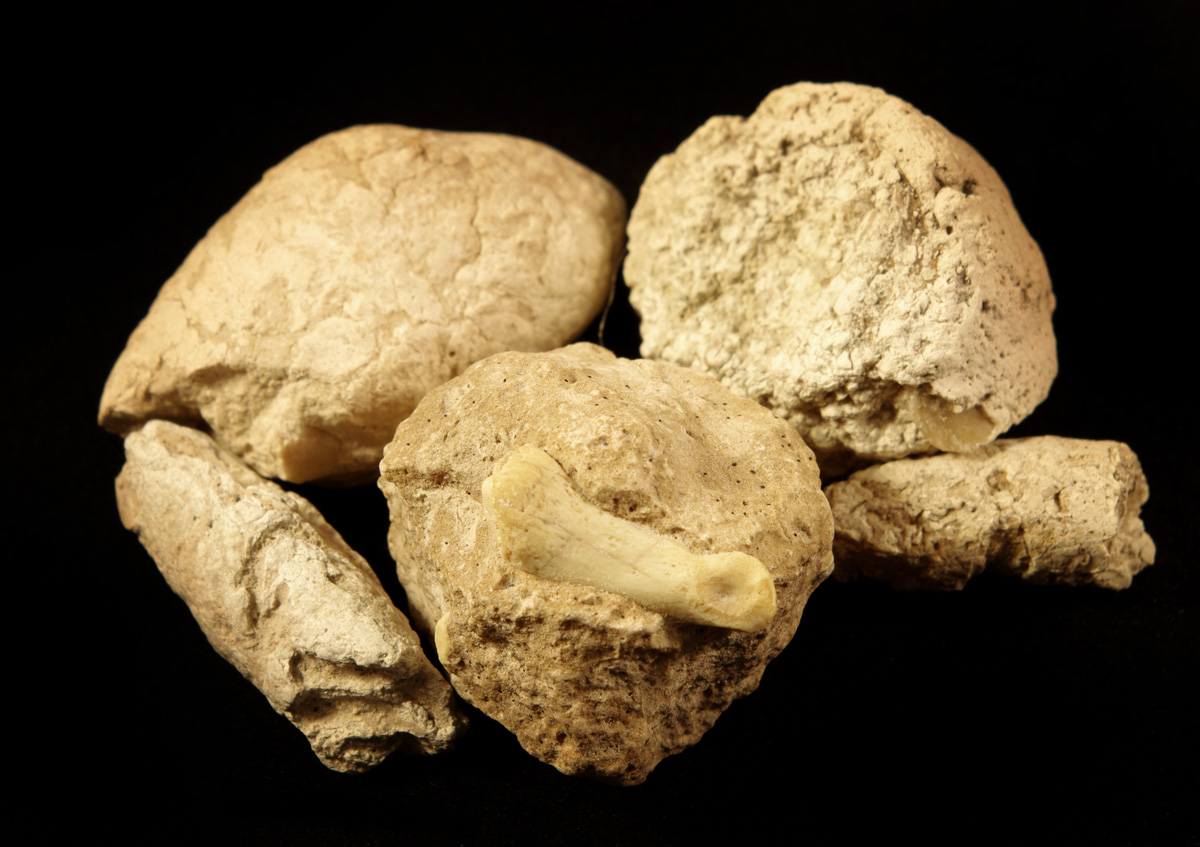
A coprolite containing a complete toe bone from a Leptomeryx, a small deer-like ruminant

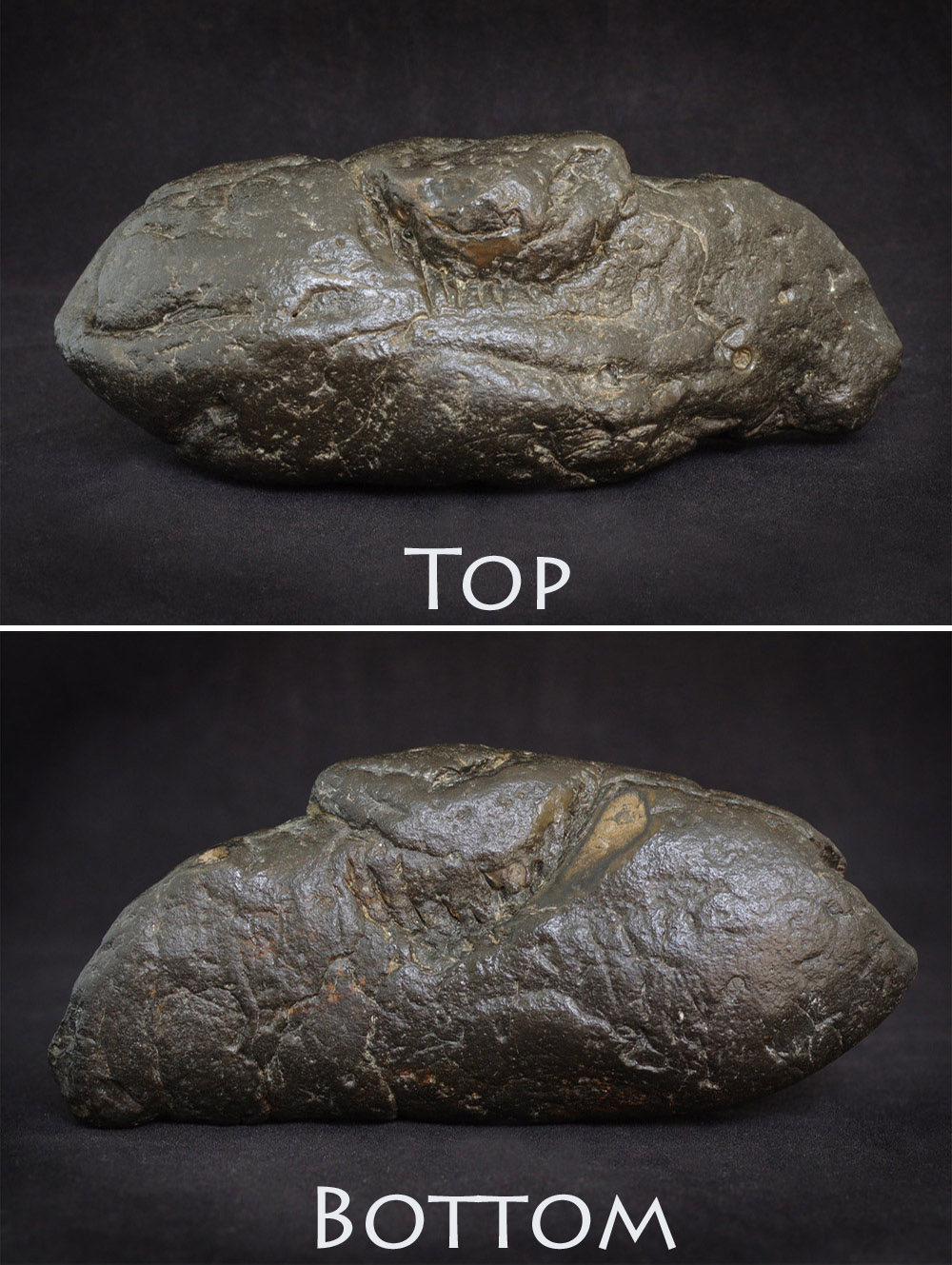
A coprolite with distinct bite marks, possibly from a prehistoric gar fish

== See also ==
- Lloyds Bank coprolite
