= Alpine Slide at Magic Mountain =

Amusement park in California

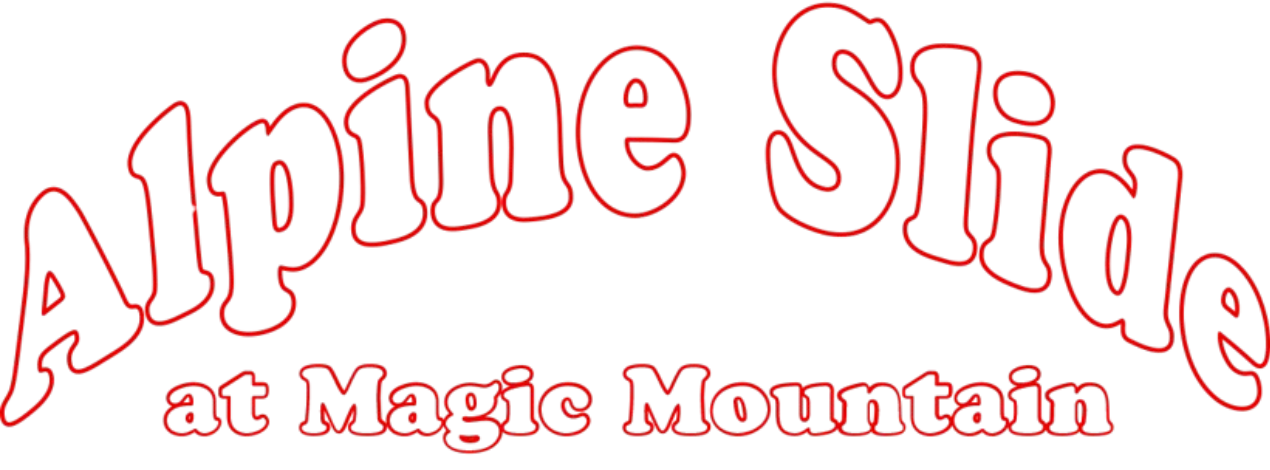

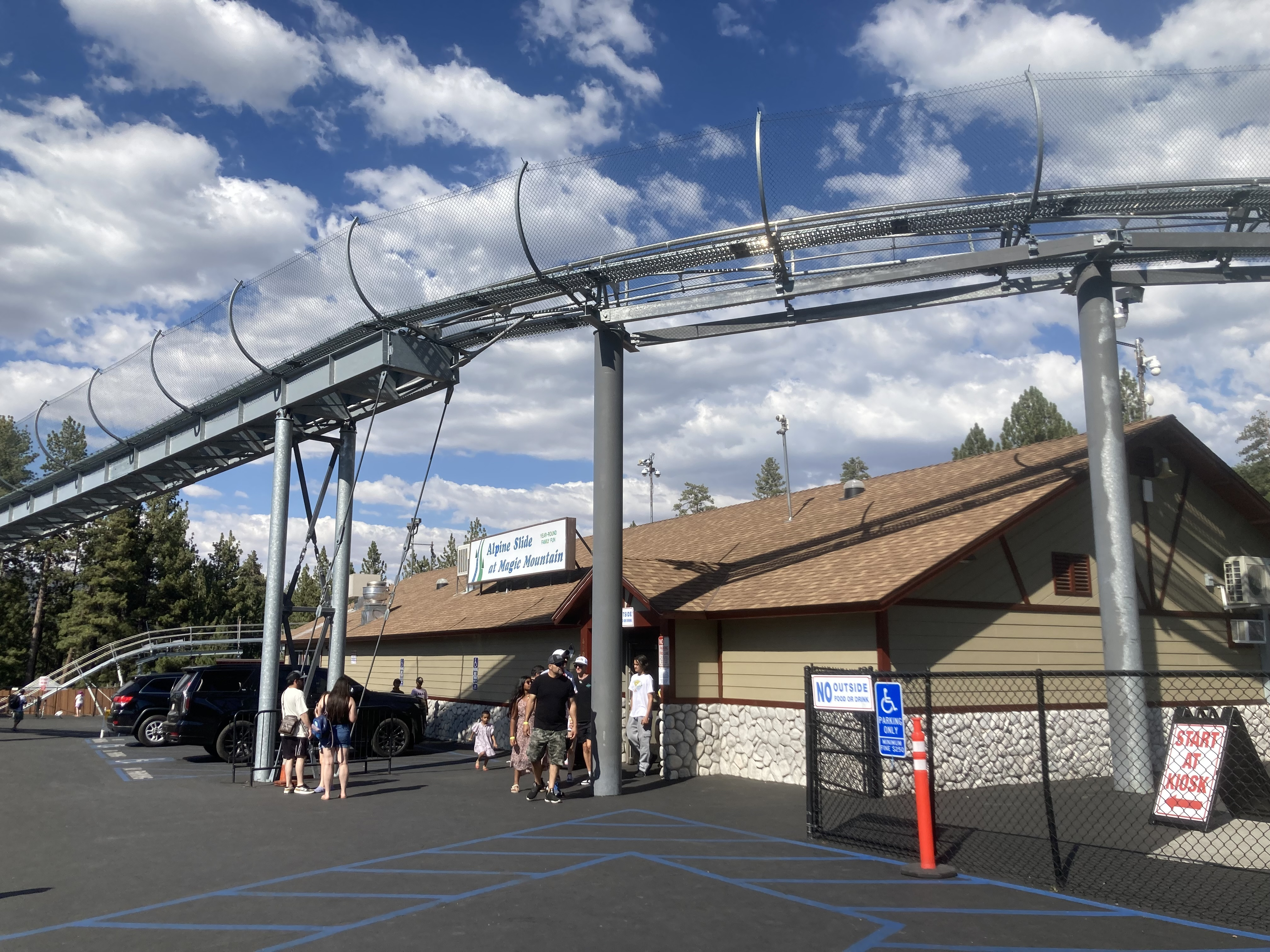
- Entrance to the park
- Interactive map of Alpine Slide at Magic Mountain
- Location: 800 Wildrose Ln, Big Bear Lake, CA 92315
- Coordinates: 34.2383°N 116.9210°W
- Status: Operating
- Opened: July 8, 1983
- Owner: Bruce Voigt; Kim Voigt
- Operated by: Bruce Voigt; Kim Voigt
- General manager: Julie Eubanks

Attractions
- Total: 6
- Roller coasters: 1
- Website: alpineslidebigbear.com

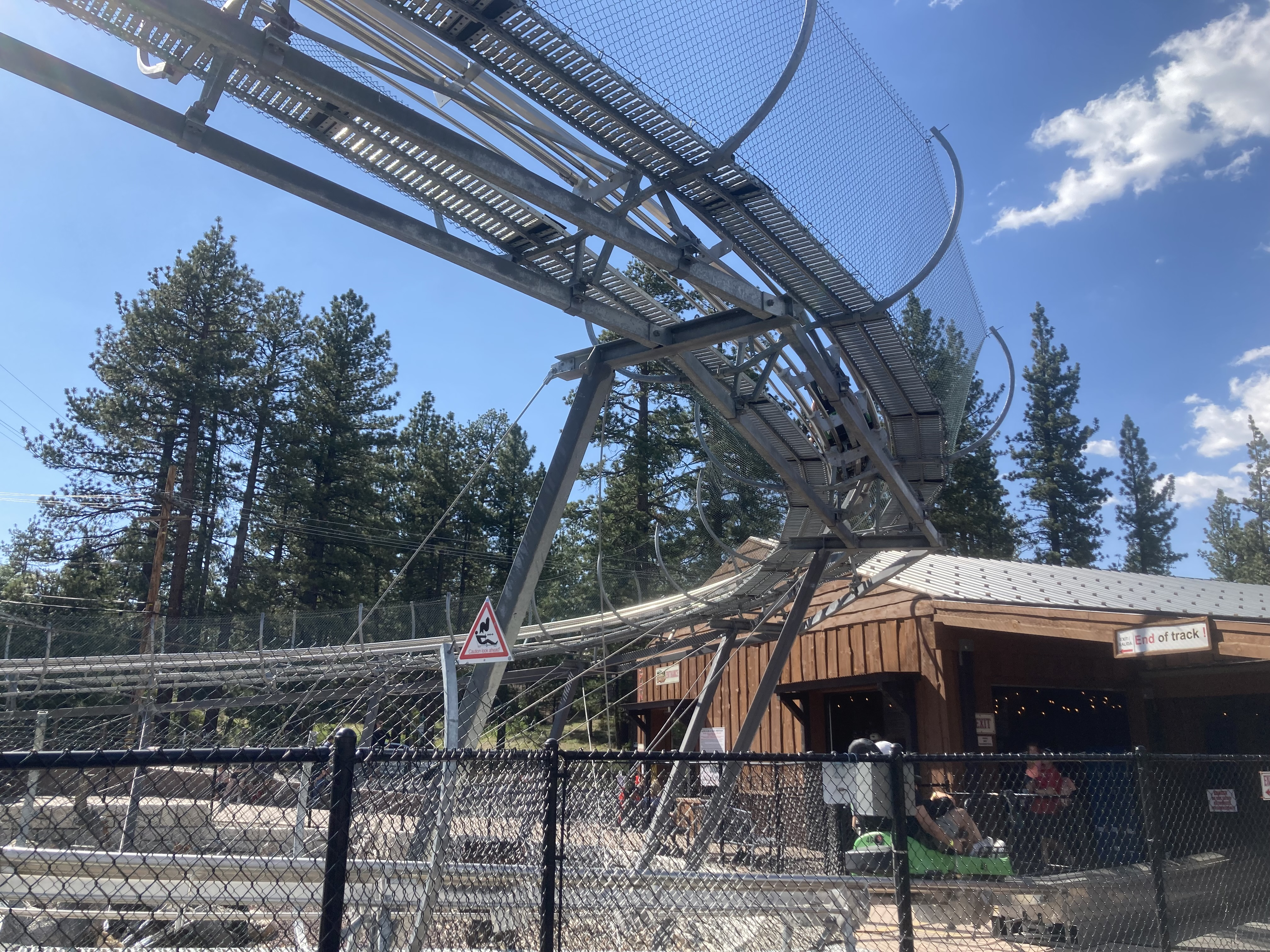
The end of the Mineshaft Coaster

The Alpine Slide at Magic Mountain is an amusement park in Big Bear Lake, California. It is known for its namesake slide that can be ridden down the mountain and its mountain coaster, the Mineshaft Coaster. This coaster is the first and only mountain coaster in California. The park is owned and operated by Bruce and Kim Voigt, who have the same position at the Canyon Coaster Adventure Park in Williams, Arizona.

== History ==
The Alpine Slide at Magic Mountain was established on July 8, 1983.

The Soaring Eagle ride was added in 2018. The Mineshaft Coaster opened on May 19, 2021.

== Features ==
The Alpine slide, for which the park is named, has riders go down one of two 0.25 mi (0.40 km) cement slides on wheeled sleds. The Mineshaft Coaster is approximately 1 mi (1.6 km) long and lasts 7 to 9 minutes, peaking at 30 mph (48 km/h). The track includes hairpin turns, tunnels, and corkscrew turns that are built into the mountain. Riders can control the speed and braking of the coaster. Other attractions include go-karts, an 18-hole miniature golf course, snow tubing, a fast and short sky ride called the Soaring Eagle, and two water slides. The water slide is only available to be ridden in the summer and one can only participate in the go-karts, miniature golf, and snow tubing in the winter. There is also a snack bar.
