= Canyon Coaster Adventure Park =

Amusement park in Arizona, US

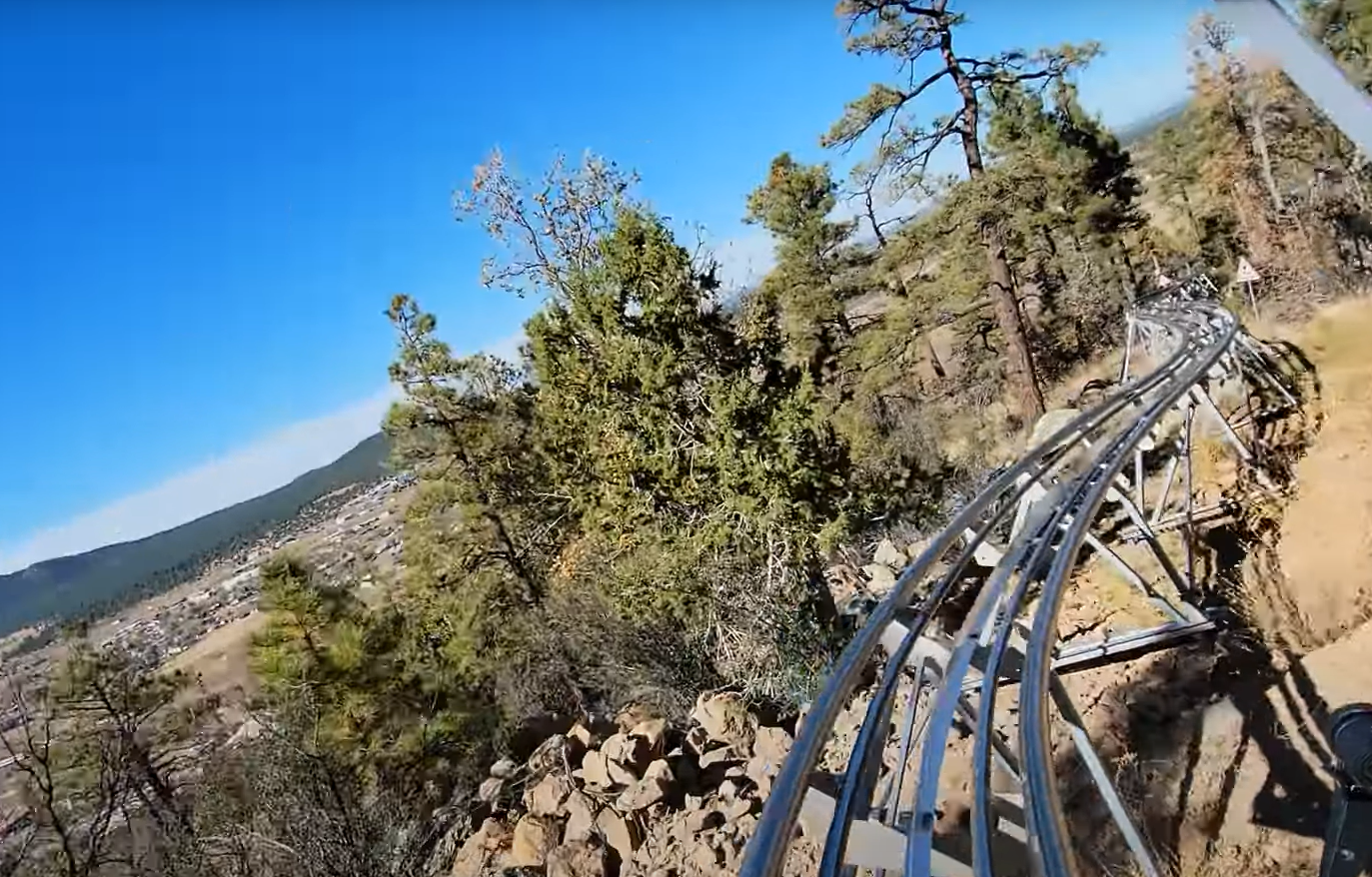
- The ride in 2022
- Interactive map of Canyon Coaster Adventure Park
- Location: 700 E Rte 66, Williams, AZ 86046
- Coordinates: 35.2528°N 112.1803°W
- Status: Operating
- Opened: April 8, 2022
- Owner: Bruce Voigt; Kim Voigt
- Operated by: Bruce Voigt; Kim Voigt
- Area: 13 acres (5.3 ha)

Attractions
- Total: 2
- Roller coasters: 1
- Website: canyoncoasteradventurepark.com

Canyon Coaster Adventure Park is an amusement park in Williams, Arizona. Founded in 2022, the 13 acres (5.3 ha) park is known for its Canyon Coaster, a mountain coaster, but also offers tubing in both summer and winter. It is the first mountain coaster in Arizona.

== History ==
The park was created by Bruce and Kim Voigt, who had previously opened the Mineshaft Coaster at the Alpine Slide at Magic Mountain in Big Bear Lake, California, and Scott and Louis Towsley. The Williams Planning and Zoning Commission approved the rezoning of a parcel of land on William's east side for a theme park in December 2020. Many citizens opposed the decision as it was near a residential area and visitors may create noise and traffic. The park was delayed from a fall opening due to supply chain issues. It soft-opened on April 8, 2022, to residents of Williams and nearby cities.

== Features ==
The Canyon Coaster, the park's namesake, has a backdrop of mountains along its 1 mi (1.6 km)-long track. It is 35 ft (11 m) tall and is built into the mountain, offering natural curves that go with the landscape. Riders can control the speed and braking of the cart. It also offers tubing, where in the summer there are 400 ft (120 m) of the track as opposed to winter where the natural mountain is used. Two conveyor lifts serve in both seasons. A bar and grill operates at the park.
