= Williams, Arizona =

City in Coconino County, Arizona

- City
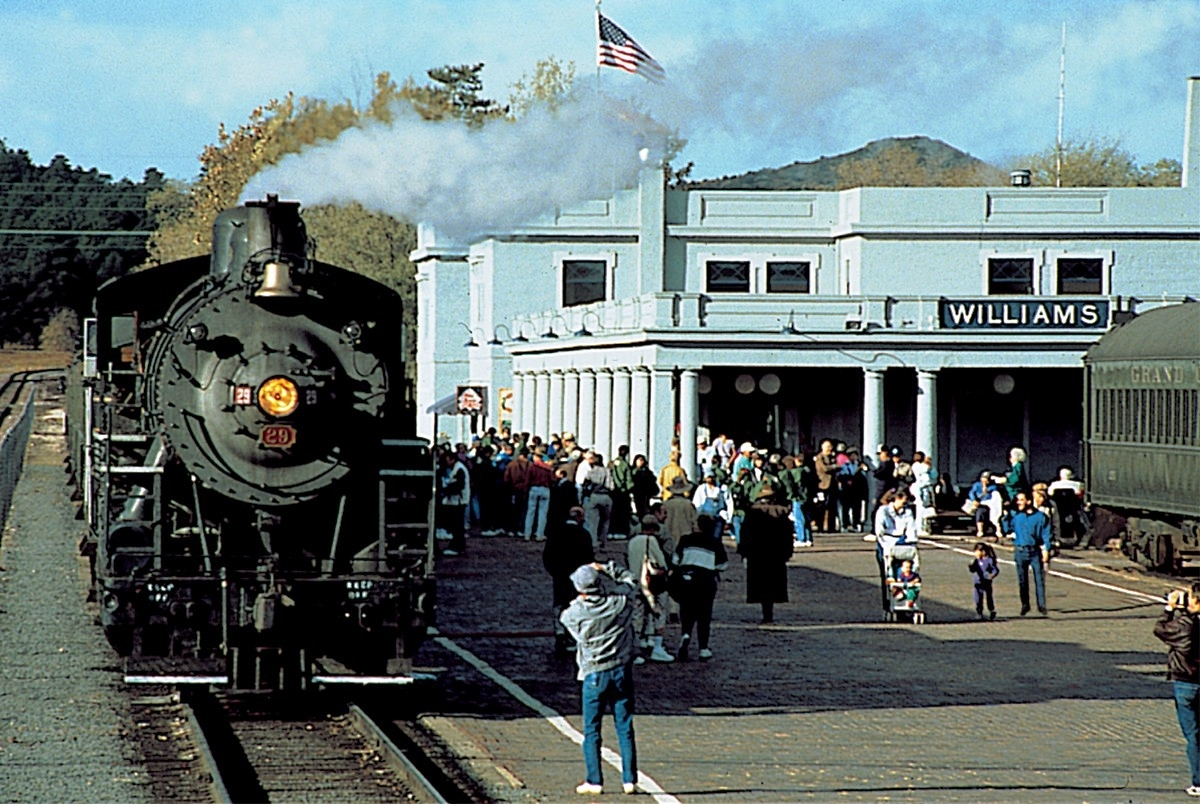
- Steam locomotive 29 and train sitting at Williams Depot, 1993
- Nickname: Gateway to the Grand Canyon
- Location of Williams in Coconino County, Arizona

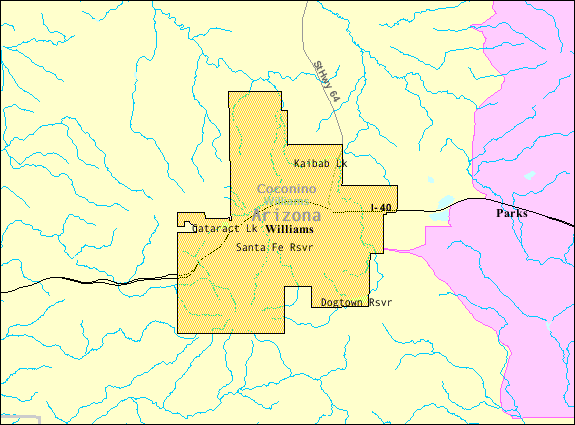
- U.S. Census Map

- Location in the United States Williams (the United States)
- Coordinates: 35°15′34″N 112°09′04″W
- Country: United States
- State: Arizona
- County: Coconino
- Settled: 1881
- Incorporated: July 9, 1901

Government
  - Type: Council-Manager
  - Mayor: Don Dent
  - Vice Mayor: Frank McNelly
  - City Manager: Tim Pettit

Area
  - Total: 44.17 sq mi (114.41 km^{2})
  - Land: 43.83 sq mi (113.52 km^{2})
  - Water: 0.34 sq mi (0.89 km^{2})
- Elevation: 6,916 ft (2,108 m)

Population (2020)
  - Total: 3,202
  - Density: 73.1/sq mi (28.21/km^{2})
- Time zone: UTC−7 (MST)
- ZIP code: 86046
- Area code: 928
- FIPS code: 04-83160
- GNIS feature ID: 2412267
- Website: City of Williams

Williams is a city in Coconino County, Arizona, United States, located west of Flagstaff. As of the 2020 census, Williams had a population of 3,202. It lies on the routes of Historic Route 66 and Interstate 40. It is also the southern terminus of the Grand Canyon Railway, which takes visitors to Grand Canyon Village.

Also known as the "Gateway to the Grand Canyon", Williams was the last city on Historic Route 66 to be bypassed by Interstate 40.

The Historic Downtown District covers six blocks.

== History ==
Founded in 1881, Williams was named for William Sherley "Old Bill" Williams (1787–1849), a famous trapper, trader, scout and mountain man, who often trapped in the area. A statue of "Old Bill" stands in Monument Park, located on the west side of the city. The large mountain directly to the south is named Bill Williams Mountain. The city was incorporated on July 9, 1901.

Williams was the last city whose section of Route 66 was bypassed, due to lawsuits that kept the last section of Interstate 40 in Arizona from being built around the city. After settlements called for the state to build three Williams exits, the suits were dropped and I-40 was completed. On October 13, 1984, Interstate 40 was opened around the town and newspapers the next day reported the essential end of US 66. The following year, Route 66 was decommissioned.

The Williams Historic Business District and Urban Route 66, Williams were added to the National Register of Historic Places in 1984 and 1989, respectively.

== Geography ==
Bill Williams Mountain rises to an elevation of 9,256 feet (2,821 m) just south of Williams. According to the United States Census Bureau, the city has a total area of 43.8 square miles (113 km^{2}), of which 43.5 square miles (113 km^{2}) is land and 0.3 square miles (0.78 km^{2}), or 0.66%, is water.

=== Climate ===
On average in Williams, December is the coldest month, July is the warmest month, and August is the wettest month. The hottest temperature recorded in Williams was 102 °F (39 °C) in 1909; the coldest temperature recorded was −25 °F (−32 °C) in 1937. It has a temperate oceanic climate (Köppen: Cfb), a rarity in Arizona. All months average between freezing and 71.6 °F (22 °C) and six months average above 50 °F (10 °C).

Climate data for Williams, Arizona (1991–2020 normals, extremes 1897–present)
| Month | Jan | Feb | Mar | Apr | May | Jun | Jul | Aug | Sep | Oct | Nov | Dec | Year |
|---|---|---|---|---|---|---|---|---|---|---|---|---|---|
| Record high °F (°C) | 74 (23) | 74 (23) | 76 (24) | 87 (31) | 92 (33) | 100 (38) | 102 (39) | 101 (38) | 93 (34) | 86 (30) | 80 (27) | 74 (23) | 102 (39) |
| Mean maximum °F (°C) | 58.6 (14.8) | 60.6 (15.9) | 66.7 (19.3) | 73.9 (23.3) | 81.7 (27.6) | 90.0 (32.2) | 92.1 (33.4) | 88.7 (31.5) | 83.9 (28.8) | 77.4 (25.2) | 68.1 (20.1) | 60.2 (15.7) | 93.0 (33.9) |
| Mean daily maximum °F (°C) | 47.2 (8.4) | 49.2 (9.6) | 55.6 (13.1) | 62.3 (16.8) | 71.2 (21.8) | 81.8 (27.7) | 84.1 (28.9) | 81.5 (27.5) | 76.4 (24.7) | 66.7 (19.3) | 55.7 (13.2) | 47.0 (8.3) | 64.9 (18.3) |
| Daily mean °F (°C) | 34.3 (1.3) | 35.9 (2.2) | 41.2 (5.1) | 46.8 (8.2) | 55.1 (12.8) | 64.9 (18.3) | 68.8 (20.4) | 66.9 (19.4) | 61.5 (16.4) | 51.3 (10.7) | 41.7 (5.4) | 33.9 (1.1) | 50.2 (10.1) |
| Mean daily minimum °F (°C) | 21.4 (−5.9) | 22.7 (−5.2) | 26.8 (−2.9) | 31.3 (−0.4) | 39.1 (3.9) | 47.9 (8.8) | 53.6 (12.0) | 52.3 (11.3) | 46.6 (8.1) | 36.0 (2.2) | 27.6 (−2.4) | 20.8 (−6.2) | 35.5 (1.9) |
| Mean minimum °F (°C) | 7.4 (−13.7) | 8.5 (−13.1) | 14.0 (−10.0) | 20.7 (−6.3) | 27.7 (−2.4) | 36.4 (2.4) | 47.7 (8.7) | 47.0 (8.3) | 36.6 (2.6) | 23.3 (−4.8) | 13.6 (−10.2) | 6.6 (−14.1) | 2.6 (−16.3) |
| Record low °F (°C) | −25 (−32) | −18 (−28) | −6 (−21) | 2 (−17) | 8 (−13) | 22 (−6) | 32 (0) | 32 (0) | 11 (−12) | 7 (−14) | −7 (−22) | −17 (−27) | −25 (−32) |
| Average precipitation inches (mm) | 2.17 (55) | 2.61 (66) | 2.00 (51) | 0.87 (22) | 0.76 (19) | 0.38 (9.7) | 2.98 (76) | 3.38 (86) | 1.59 (40) | 1.59 (40) | 1.34 (34) | 1.94 (49) | 21.61 (549) |
| Average snowfall inches (cm) | 16.8 (43) | 12.4 (31) | 11.1 (28) | 5.7 (14) | 0.1 (0.25) | 0.0 (0.0) | 0.0 (0.0) | 0.0 (0.0) | 0.0 (0.0) | 0.7 (1.8) | 4.8 (12) | 13.5 (34) | 65.1 (165) |
| Average extreme snow depth inches (cm) | 7 (18) | 6 (15) | 5 (13) | 2 (5.1) | 0 (0) | 0 (0) | 0 (0) | 0 (0) | 0 (0) | 0 (0) | 2 (5.1) | 5 (13) | 7 (18) |
| Average precipitation days (≥ 0.01 inch) | 6.6 | 6.4 | 5.9 | 3.7 | 4.1 | 2.5 | 10.8 | 12.6 | 6.5 | 4.4 | 3.9 | 5.8 | 73.2 |
| Average snowy days (≥ 0.1 inch) | 3.8 | 3.9 | 2.9 | 1.6 | 0.1 | 0.0 | 0.0 | 0.0 | 0.0 | 0.2 | 1.7 | 3.3 | 17.5 |
Source: NOAA

== Demographics ==
Historical population
| Census | Pop. | Note | %± |
|---|---|---|---|
| 1890 | 199 | | — |
| 1910 | 1,267 | | — |
| 1920 | 1,350 | | 6.6% |
| 1930 | 2,166 | | 60.4% |
| 1940 | 2,622 | | 21.1% |
| 1950 | 2,152 | | −17.9% |
| 1960 | 3,559 | | 65.4% |
| 1970 | 2,386 | | −33.0% |
| 1980 | 2,266 | | −5.0% |
| 1990 | 2,532 | | 11.7% |
| 2000 | 2,842 | | 12.2% |
| 2010 | 3,023 | | 6.4% |
| 2020 | 3,202 | | 5.9% |
U.S. Decennial Census

=== 2020 census ===
As of the 2020 census, Williams had a population of 3,202. The median age was 42.0 years. 23.7% of residents were under the age of 18 and 20.5% of residents were 65 years of age or older. For every 100 females there were 97.7 males, and for every 100 females age 18 and over there were 99.0 males age 18 and over.

0.0% of residents lived in urban areas, while 100.0% lived in rural areas.

There were 1,307 households in Williams, of which 31.8% had children under the age of 18 living in them. Of all households, 46.2% were married-couple households, 21.2% were households with a male householder and no spouse or partner present, and 25.2% were households with a female householder and no spouse or partner present. About 27.7% of all households were made up of individuals and 11.8% had someone living alone who was 65 years of age or older.

There were 1,638 housing units, of which 20.2% were vacant. The homeowner vacancy rate was 3.1% and the rental vacancy rate was 12.0%.

Racial composition as of the 2020 census
| Race | Number | Percent |
|---|---|---|
| White | 2,062 | 64.4% |
| Black or African American | 55 | 1.7% |
| American Indian and Alaska Native | 71 | 2.2% |
| Asian | 55 | 1.7% |
| Native Hawaiian and Other Pacific Islander | 2 | 0.1% |
| Some other race | 461 | 14.4% |
| Two or more races | 496 | 15.5% |
| Hispanic or Latino (of any race) | 1,089 | 34.0% |

=== 2000 census ===
As of the 2000 census, there were 2,842 people, 1,057 households, and 733 families residing in the city. The population density was 65.3 inhabitants per square mile (25.2/km^{2}). There were 1,204 housing units at an average density of 27.7 per square mile (10.7/km^{2}). The racial makeup of the city was 77.1% White, 2.9% Black or African American, 1.7% Native American, 1.3% Asian, <0.1% Pacific Islander, 14.2% from other races, and 2.7% from two or more races. 32.3% of the population were Hispanic or Latino of any race.

There were 1,057 households, out of which 36.2% had children under the age of 18 living with them, 51.1% were married couples living together, 13.3% had a female householder with no husband present, and 30.6% were non-families. 26.6% of all households were made up of individuals, and 11.4% had someone living alone who was 65 years of age or older. The average household size was 2.69 and the average family size was 3.24.

In the city, the age distribution of the population shows 29.8% under the age of 18, 8.6% from 18 to 24, 28.3% from 25 to 44, 22.2% from 45 to 64, and 11.1% who were 65 years of age or older. The median age was 35 years. For every 100 females, there were 103.4 males. For every 100 females age 18 and over, there were 96.4 males.

The median income for a household in the city was $32,455, and the median income for a family was $39,063. Males had a median income of $27,237 versus $25,162 for females. The per capita income for the city was $16,223. About 9.9% of families and 12.8% of the population were below the poverty line, including 18.2% of those under age 18 and 11.6% of those age 65 or over.

== Economy ==
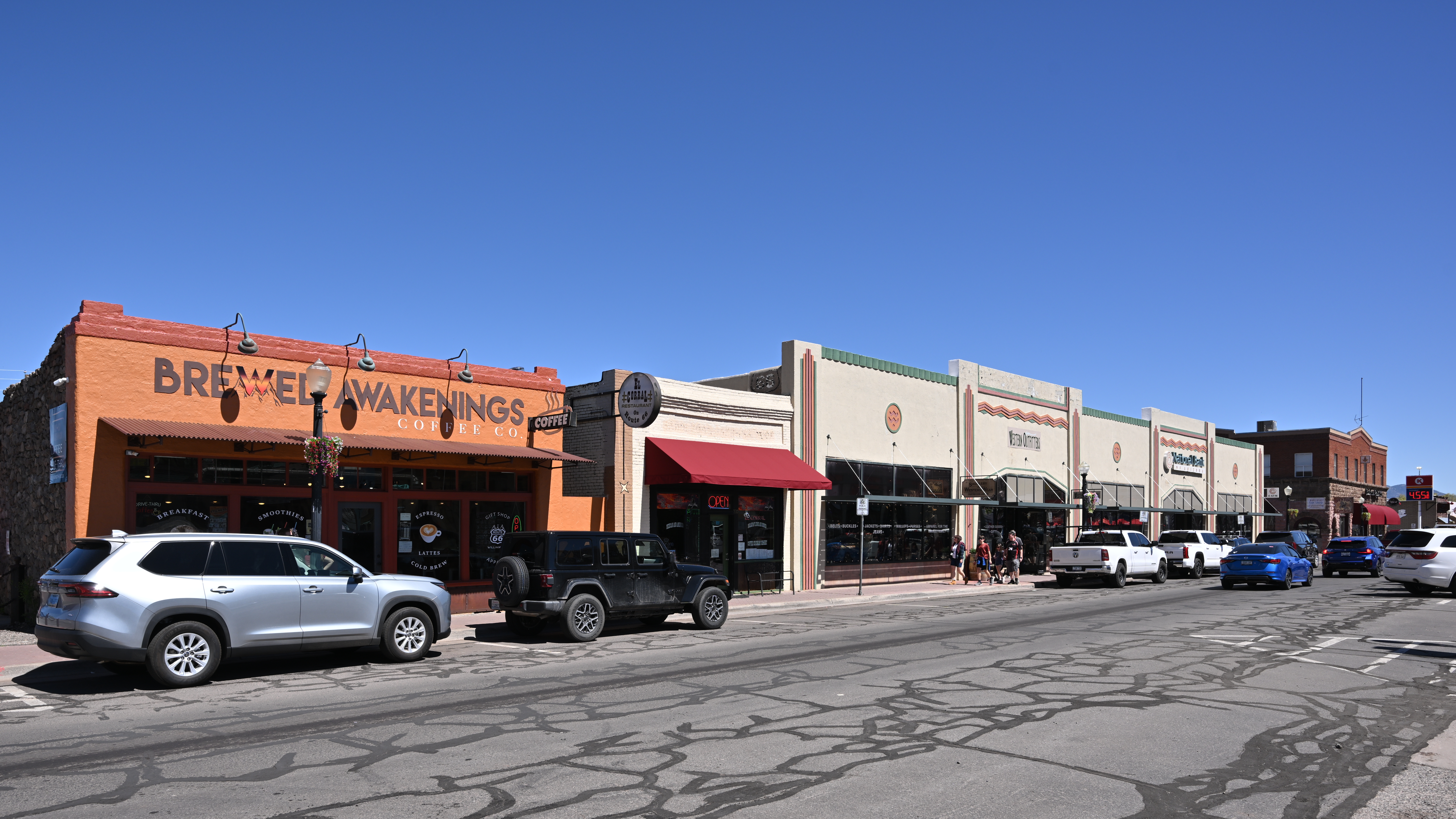
Row of shops in Williams, AZ

The majority of economic activity for Williams is derived from tourism. Williams is approximately a one-hour, sixty mile car drive from the South Entrance of the Grand Canyon, and forty-two miles west of the City of Flagstaff via the Interstate 40. Other notable Williams attractions include Bearizona Wildlife Park, the Grand Canyon Railway & Hotel, Grand Canyon Deer Farm, Canyon Coaster Adventure Park, Pete's Route 66 Gas Station Museum, the Planes of Fame Air Museum and the Poozeum.

== Arts and culture ==
Williams has an arts and cultural events schedule that runs year-round. Starting in December and running through January, The Polar Express operated by the Grand Canyon Railway is a train ride based on the popular children's book The Polar Express written by Chris Van Allsburg. The city also hosts the Historic Route 66 Car Show featuring automobiles from Route 66's heyday. During the summer months The Cataract Creek Gang acts out a gun fight every night in the streets of Williams. This cast of Old West characters also tend to "rob" the Grand Canyon Railway train upon its return from the canyon.

== Parks and recreation ==
The city of Williams Parks and Recreation Department operates several parks and public facilities throughout the city. Recreation Center is centered around youth activities and entertainment and features an indoor basketball court called the "Shed". Besides playing basketball at the shed, it hosts Williams youth cheerleaders, Williams Folklorico Dancers, Youth basketball teams, and other groups or events. Sylvia Lopez, Parks and Recreation Manager, Dec 14, 2022 Public Announcement The city hosts a public swimming pool located at the Williams Aquatic Center, an indoor facility offering seasonal and recreational swimming activities. The pool is open the Saturday before Memorial Day and closes the Saturday before Labor Day every year. Cureton Park offers softball, baseball and basketball courts, picnic area and public restrooms. Buckskinner Park has a basketball and volleyball court and a lake that is stocked regularly by the Arizona Game and Fish Department and features a trail head to several trails maintained by the United States Forest Service. Cataract Lake County Park is a joint venture between Coconino County and the City of Williams and includes several barbecue pits, a playground and public restroom facilities including a lake stocked regularly by the Arizona Game and Fish Department. Dogtown Reservoir and its recreational facilities are nearby. The city also maintains a rodeo facility that hosts the annual Williams Reunion Rodeo.

== Government ==
The City of Williams has adopted the Council-Manager form of government. The Williams City Council is the city's legislative body. The seven-member council oversees the operations of the city government and sets policy by approving programs, appropriating funds, enacting laws and appointing the City Manager and other officers such as the City Attorney, City Clerk and City Magistrate. Williams' Mayor and City Council are elected at large. The Mayor serves a two-year term and Council members serve overlapping four-year terms.

The City Manager is appointed by, and serves at the pleasure of, the City Council and is responsible for overseeing the daily operations of the city. The role of the City Manager is to execute the policies and programs established by the City Council and to provide administrative leadership and management of municipal operations.

Federally, Williams is part of Arizona's 2nd congressional district.

== Education ==
Williams is served by the Williams Unified School District. Two schools, Williams Elementary Middle School, and Williams High School, serve the city. A charter school, Heritage Elementary Charter School, also provides services.

== Media ==
=== Film ===
Films shot in and around Williams include:

- Guns of the Timberland (1960), starring Alan Ladd, Frankie Avalon and Jeanne Crain
- Midnight Run (1988), starring Robert De Niro and Charles Grodin
- Nurse Betty (2000), starring Morgan Freeman, Renée Zellweger and Chris Rock
- Speechless (1994), starring Michael Keaton, Geena Davis and Christopher Reeve

=== Print ===
The weekly Williams News has been published in town since 1892. It is owned by Western News & Info.

== Infrastructure ==
=== Transportation ===
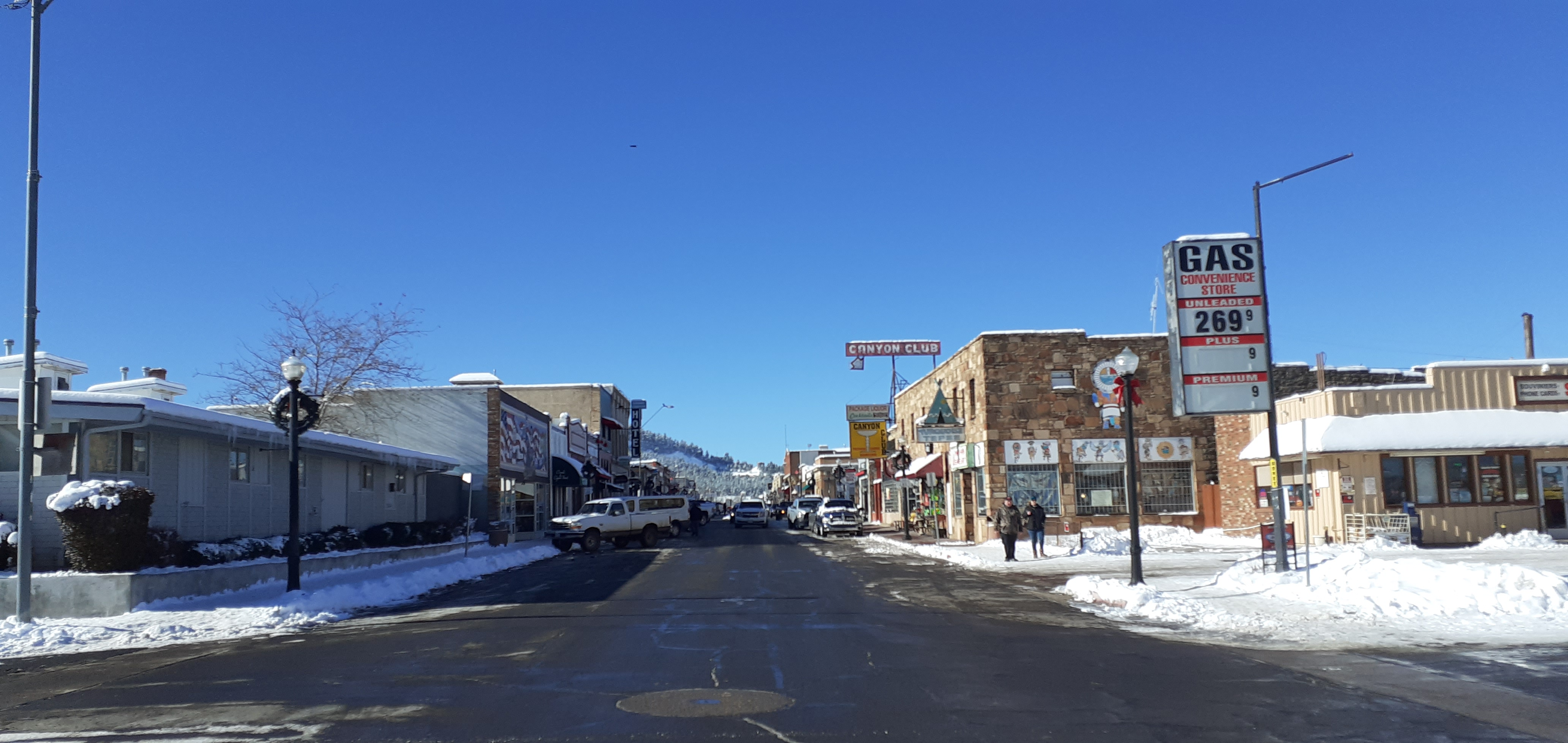
Williams town center

Amtrak‘s Southwest Chief train served Williams between 1999 and 2017, calling at Williams Junction, 3 miles (4.8 km) east of town. Passengers were shuttled from the station to downtown Williams by Amtrak Thruway. Following the closure of Williams Junction in 2018, Amtrak introduced a new Thruway bus service between Williams and Flagstaff.

The surviving downtown station is the southern terminus of the Grand Canyon Railway.

Williams has a small general aviation airport, the H.A. Clark Memorial Field.

== Notable people ==
- Hap Collard, Major League Baseball pitcher
- Diana Gabaldon, writer and actress known for the Outlander novels and Outlander TV series
- Ross Hagen, voice actor, director, screenwriter and producer
- Billy Hatcher, baseball player and coach
- Tom Ray, animator for Warner Brothers cartoons
- Old Bill Williams, namesake of the town

== See also ==
- Keyhole Sink
- Kaibab Lake
- Dogtown Lake
- Media related to Williams, Arizona at Wikimedia Commons
