= List of Arizona state parks =

Location of state parks within Arizona

This is a list of individual parks within the Arizona State Parks & Trails system. An Arizona state park is a protected area in the U.S. state of Arizona managed wholly or partly by Arizona State Parks & Trails. The system includes 33 units -- 15 camping parks, 8 historic parks, 1 memorial state park, and 8 recreation parks for day-use only. One park, San Rafael State Natural Area, is not open to the public.

For information about the managing agency, see Arizona State Parks & Trails.

== Arizona state parks ==
Name	County	Size (Note: All data come from respective park webpages unless otherwise noted.)		Elevation		Estab- lished	Image	Remarks
Name	County	acres	ha	ft	m	Estab- lished	Image	Remarks
Alamo Lake State Park	La Paz & Mohave	4,900	2,000	1,300	400	1969		Features a remote reservoir on the Bill Williams River with bass fishing and stargazing
Buckskin Mountain State Park	La Paz	1,677	679	420	130	1967		Provides water recreation on the Colorado River in the Parker Valley
Catalina State Park	Pima	5,493	2,223	2,650	810	1974		Preserves a diverse desert landscape at the foot of the Santa Catalina Mountains
Cattail Cove State Park	Mohave	2,000	810	450	140	1970		Provides water recreation on Lake Havasu
Colorado River State Historic Park	Yuma	10	4.0	120	37	1997		
Dankworth Pond State Park	Graham							Companion to Roper Lake State Park
Dead Horse Ranch State Park	Yavapai	423	171	3,300	1,000	1972		Provides outdoor recreation along the Verde River
Fool Hollow Lake Recreation Area	Navajo	800	320	6,300	1,900	1994		Surrounds a 150-acre (61 ha) mountain reservoir
Fort Verde State Historic Park	Yavapai	11	4.5	3,260	990	1970		Interprets the best-preserved Indian Wars-era fort in Arizona, active from 1871 to 1891
Granite Mountain Hotshots Memorial State Park	Yavapai	320	130	4,318–5,460	1,316–1,664	2016		Memorial to the nineteen members of the Granite Mountain Hotshots who died there on June 30, 2013, while fighting the Yarnell Hill Fire
Homolovi State Park	Navajo	4,500	1,800	4,900	1,500	1986		Preserves several pueblo ruins and other Ancestral Puebloan archaeological sites
Jerome State Historic Park	Yavapai	2	0.81	5,000	1,500	1957		Honors the Douglas family of mining entrepreneurs in their 1916 adobe mansion
Kartchner Caverns State Park	Cochise	550	220	4,700	1,400	1988		Preserves a limestone cave kept in near-pristine condition since its discovery in 1974
Lake Havasu State Park	Mohave	928	376	480	150	1965		Provides water recreation on Lake Havasu
Lost Dutchman State Park	Pinal	320	130	2,000	610	1977		Faces the Superstition Mountains, where the Lost Dutchman's Gold Mine is said to be hidden
Lyman Lake State Park	Apache	1,200	490	6,000	1,800	1960		Features Lyman Reservoir and a 14th Century pueblo ruin
McFarland State Historic Park	Pinal			1,500	460	1974		Preserves a courthouse and jail from the Arizona Territory era
Oracle State Park	Pinal	3,948	1,598	3,700	1,100	1986		Features an environmental learning center, historic ranch house, and wildlife habitat in the foothills of the Santa Catalina Mountains
Patagonia Lake State Park	Santa Cruz	2,658	1,076	3,750	1,140	1974		Provides recreational opportunities on Patagonia Lake
Picacho Peak State Park	Pinal	3,747	1,516	2,000	610	1965		Features a distinctive 3,374-foot (1,028 m) peak and spring wildflowers
Red Rock State Park	Yavapai	286	116	3,900	1,200	1986		Preserves a section of scenic red rock canyon
Riordan Mansion State Historic Park	Coconino	5	2.0	6,900	2,100	1978		Interprets the 1904 adjoined homes of lumber-baron brothers Timothy and Michael Riordan
River Island State Park	La Paz							Companion to Buckskin Mountain State Park
Rockin' River Ranch State Park	Yavapai	209	85	3,130	950	2024		Confluence of the Verde River and West Clear Creek
Roper Lake State Park	Graham	338	137	3,130	950	1972		Features a 32-acre (13 ha) fishing reservoir and a pond fed by a natural hot spring
San Rafael State Natural Area	Santa Cruz	3,557	1,439	4,750	1,450	1999		Preserves a native grassland largely free of invasive plants. A former ranch complex is now a district on the National Register of Historic Places. Not open to the public
Slide Rock State Park	Coconino	43	17	4,930	1,500	1985		Features a natural waterslide and historic apple orchard in Oak Creek Canyon
Sonoita Creek State Natural Area	Santa Cruz	9,584	3,879	3,750	1,140	1994		Preserves a diverse transition zone around Sonoita Creek adjacent to Patagonia Lake State Park
Tombstone Courthouse State Historic Park	Cochise			4,539	1,383	1959		Preserves the historic 1882 courthouse, sheriff's office, and jail
Tonto Natural Bridge State Park	Gila	161	65	4,530	1,380	1969		Features the world's largest natural arch made of travertine
Tubac Presidio State Historic Park	Santa Cruz			3,500	1,100	1958		Preserves the ruins of the 1753 Presidio San Ignacio de Tubac, an 1885 schoolhouse, and other structures
Verde River Greenway State Natural Area	Yavapai	480	190	3,300	1,000	1986		Preserves a 6-mile (9.7 km) section of the Verde River adjacent to Dead Horse Ranch State Park
Yuma Quartermaster Depot State Historic Park	Yuma			120	37	1997		Interprets an 1864 U.S. Army facility that supplied 14 military posts around the Southwest
Yuma Territorial Prison State Historic Park	Yuma			120	37	1960		Interprets Arizona Territory prison that operated from 1876 to 1909

== See also ==
- List of U.S. national parks
