= Patagonia (disambiguation) =

Patagonia is a region of South America, shared between Argentina and Chile.

Patagonia may also refer to:

== Places ==
- Patagonia, Arizona, US
- Patagonia Lake, in Arizona
- Patagonia Mountains, in Arizona

== Animals ==
- Patagonia (mammal), extinct genus from Argentina
- Patagonia, a snout moth genus in tribe Phycitini

== Arts, entertainment, and media ==
- Patagonia (film), 2010
- Patagonia Mail, the fictional employer of the airmail pilot Fabien, in Antoine Saint-Exupéry's novel Night Flight
- In Patagonia, a travel book by Bruce Chatwin

== Other uses ==
- ARA Patagonia, an AOR supply ship of the Argentine Navy
- Banco Patagonia, an Argentine bank
- Patagonia, Inc., an American outdoor clothing and gear company based in Ventura, California
- Pattie Gonia, an American drag queen
