= Patagonia Lake State Park =

Protected area in Arizona

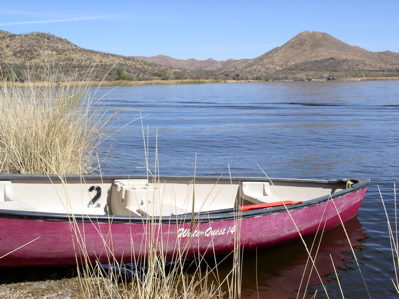

- Location within Arizona
- Location: Santa Cruz County, Arizona, United States
- Coordinates: 31°29′18″N 110°51′13″W
- Area: 2,658 acres (1,076 ha)
- Elevation: 3,750 ft (1,140 m)
- Established: 1974
- Administrator: Arizona State Parks & Trails
- Visitors: 152,781 (in 2024)
- Website: Official website

Patagonia Lake State Park is a state park of Arizona, United States, on State Route 82, 7 miles (11 km) south of Patagonia, Arizona, containing Patagonia Lake. The 2.5-mile-long (4.0 km), 250-acre (100 ha) lake is a popular southern Arizona site for fishing, camping, boat rental, picnicking, hiking, and birding. Located inside the park is the recently established Sonoita Creek State Natural Area, Arizona's first major state natural area. Created by the damming of Sonoita Creek, the lake is habitat for reproducing largemouth bass, black crappie, bluegill, green sunfish, flathead catfish, threadfin shad, redear sunfish, channel catfish, and American bullfrogs. Rainbow trout are stocked every three weeks from October to March. Sonoita Creek contains black bullhead, red shiner, mosquitofish, crayfish, American bullfrogs, largemouth bass, Gila topminnows, speckled dace, longfin dace, Sonora suckers, and desert suckers. Special events include an annual mariachi festival in March and bird tours and interpretive programs on request.

Part of the natural area is old-growth forest and recognized by Old-Growth Forest Network. The 873-acre preserve protects a magnificent example of the rare Fremont cottonwood-Goodding willow riparian forest. Some of the trees are among the largest (more than 100 feet tall) and oldest (130 years old) Fremont cottonwood trees in this country.
