= Tonto Natural Bridge =

Landform in Gila County, Arizona

Tonto Natural Bridge State Park
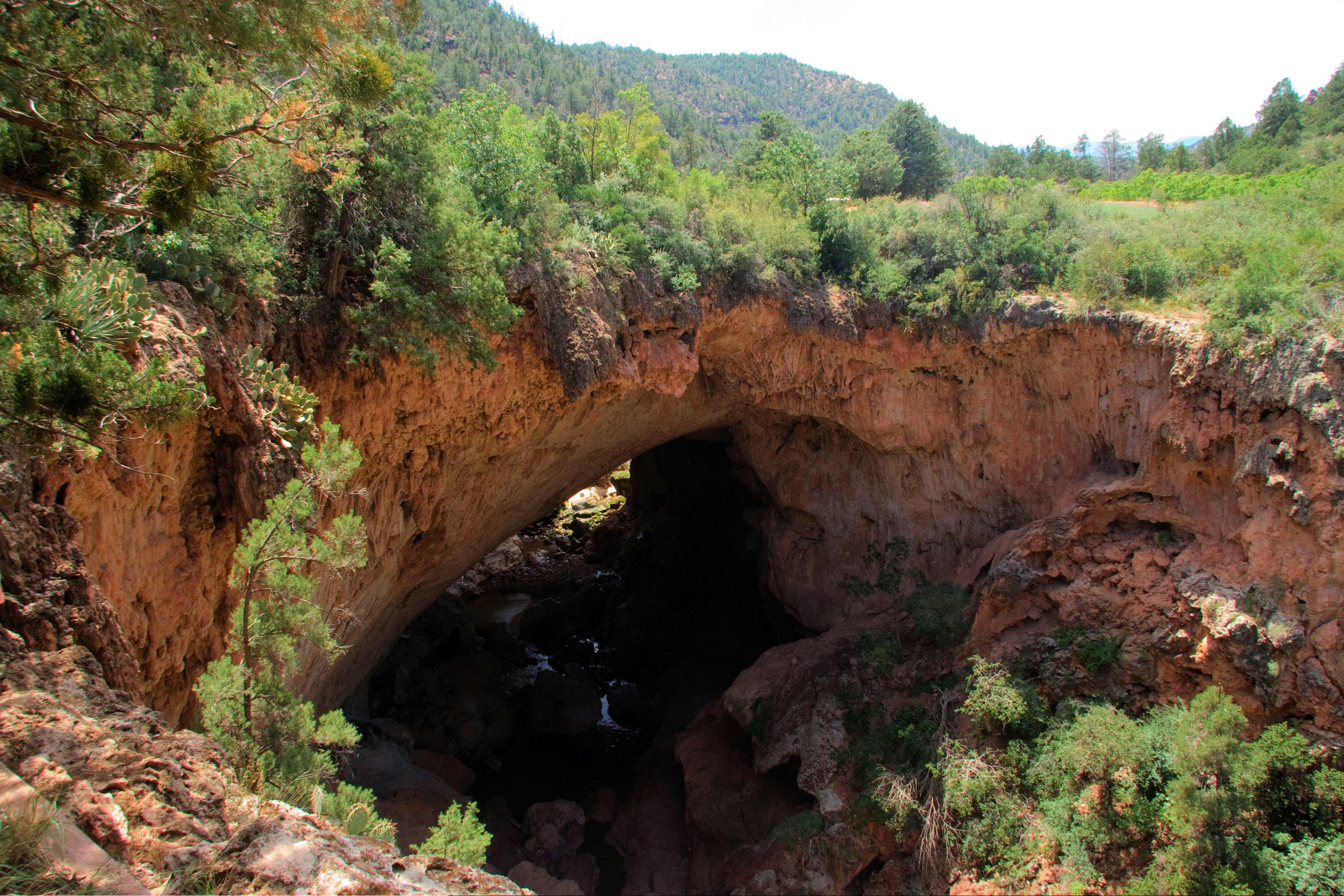

- Location within Arizona
- Location: Gila County, Arizona, United States
- Coordinates: 34°20′05″N 111°25′16″W
- Area: 161 acres (65 ha)
- Elevation: 4,530 ft (1,380 m)
- Established: 1969
- Administrator: Arizona State Parks & Trails
- Visitors: 69,42 (in 2024)
- Website: Official website
- Arizona State Parks

Tonto Natural Bridge is a natural arch in Arizona, United States, that is the central feature of Tonto Natural Bridge State Park. Believed to be the largest natural travertine bridge in the world, Tonto Natural Bridge stands over a 400-foot-long (120 m) tunnel that measures 150 feet (46 m) at its widest point and reaches a height of 183 feet (56 m). The state park is located off State Route 87 ten miles (16 km) north of Payson, Arizona.

== History ==
This natural bridge was first documented by David Gowan, a Scotsman, in 1877 while hiding from Apache tribe members. Gowan was impressed by the location and persuaded his family to emigrate and live there. Gowan also tried to claim the land for himself under squatter's rights. David Gowan died in January 1926. When deputy sheriff Jim Kline on his regular two weeks' visit, couldn't locate Gowan at his little cabin, he looked around and secured the help of a posse, which found David's body in nearby Deer Creek. The remains were buried just where they were found beside the creek.

Gowan family members lived near the bridge until 1948. Their lodge building survives to this day and is included in the National Register of Historic Places. In 1948, Glen L. Randall, a native of Pine, Arizona, purchased the Tonto Natural Bridge, the Lodge including 160 acres surrounding the natural wonder with his father Walter Randall and a brother owning a portion of it also. After Randall's death in 1967, his wife Eloise Kleinman Randall sold the property and it eventually was made into a State Park.

== Park facilities ==
Walking trails at the park include the Pine Creek Trail (0.5 miles (0.80 km) long), Waterfall Trail (600-foot (180 m) round trip to waterfall cave), and Gowan Trail (0.5-mile (0.80 km) long, ending at an observation deck in the creek bottom).

== Closure and reopening ==
It was announced in early 2010 that the park was scheduled to close on June 3, 2010, because of budget cuts and to allow for repairs to the historic lodge. Three groups eventually donated funds to allow the park to stay open until the end of September 2011. The park was reopened 5 days a week in 2013. As of 2025, the Tonto Natural Bridge State Park is open on a daily basis.

== Climate ==
According to the Köppen Climate Classification system, Tonto Natural Bridge State Park has a hot-summer mediterranean climate, abbreviated "Csa" on climate maps. The hottest temperature recorded in Tonto Natural Bridge State Park was 109 °F (42.8 °C) on June 27, 1970, while the coldest temperature recorded was 0 °F (−17.8 °C) on January 13, 1963.

Climate data for Tonto Natural Bridge, Arizona, 1991–2020 normals, extremes 1914–present
Month	Jan	Feb	Mar	Apr	May	Jun	Jul	Aug	Sep	Oct	Nov	Dec	Year
Record high °F (°C)	74 (23)	80 (27)	84 (29)	87 (31)	97 (36)	109 (43)	106 (41)	102 (39)	103 (39)	92 (33)	83 (28)	83 (28)	109 (43)
Mean maximum °F (°C)	64.5 (18.1)	68.7 (20.4)	75.7 (24.3)	82.6 (28.1)	88.9 (31.6)	97.2 (36.2)	98.3 (36.8)	96.2 (35.7)	92.2 (33.4)	84.4 (29.1)	75.9 (24.4)	65.7 (18.7)	99.9 (37.7)
Mean daily maximum °F (°C)	53.9 (12.2)	57.2 (14.0)	63.8 (17.7)	70.4 (21.3)	78.5 (25.8)	88.0 (31.1)	90.7 (32.6)	88.8 (31.6)	83.6 (28.7)	74.4 (23.6)	63.0 (17.2)	53.3 (11.8)	72.1 (22.3)
Daily mean °F (°C)	41.9 (5.5)	44.6 (7.0)	49.9 (9.9)	55.5 (13.1)	63.0 (17.2)	72.8 (22.7)	77.7 (25.4)	75.4 (24.1)	70.0 (21.1)	60.4 (15.8)	49.6 (9.8)	41.8 (5.4)	58.5 (14.8)
Mean daily minimum °F (°C)	30.0 (−1.1)	31.9 (−0.1)	35.9 (2.2)	40.7 (4.8)	47.6 (8.7)	57.7 (14.3)	64.7 (18.2)	62.1 (16.7)	56.5 (13.6)	46.4 (8.0)	36.3 (2.4)	30.2 (−1.0)	45.0 (7.2)
Mean minimum °F (°C)	17.5 (−8.1)	18.4 (−7.6)	25.1 (−3.8)	29.4 (−1.4)	35.9 (2.2)	48.6 (9.2)	56.1 (13.4)	55.7 (13.2)	45.7 (7.6)	32.3 (0.2)	23.8 (−4.6)	19.1 (−7.2)	13.3 (−10.4)
Record low °F (°C)	0 (−18)	8 (−13)	8 (−13)	22 (−6)	24 (−4)	36 (2)	44 (7)	37 (3)	31 (−1)	22 (−6)	10 (−12)	4 (−16)	0 (−18)
Average precipitation inches (mm)	2.94 (75)	2.79 (71)	1.94 (49)	0.80 (20)	0.59 (15)	0.28 (7.1)	2.67 (68)	2.62 (67)	1.95 (50)	1.30 (33)	1.60 (41)	2.24 (57)	21.72 (553.1)
Average snowfall inches (cm)	3.5 (8.9)	2.1 (5.3)	2.5 (6.4)	0.0 (0.0)	0.0 (0.0)	0.0 (0.0)	0.0 (0.0)	0.0 (0.0)	0.0 (0.0)	0.0 (0.0)	0.5 (1.3)	2.9 (7.4)	11.5 (29.3)
Average precipitation days (≥ 0.01 in)	6.8	5.4	4.5	2.6	2.6	1.6	11.8	9.3	6.3	3.1	3.0	7.8	64.8
Average snowy days (≥ 0.1 in)	1.0	0.6	0.6	0.0	0.0	0.0	0.0	0.0	0.0	0.0	0.1	0.9	3.2
Source 1: NOAA
Source 2: National Weather Service (mean maxima/minima, snow/snow days, precip days 2006–2020)
