= Tubac Presidio State Historic Park =

Park in Santa Cruz County, Arizona

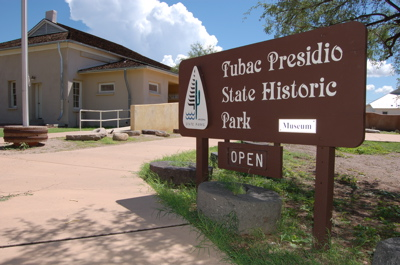

- Location within Arizona
- Location: Santa Cruz County, Arizona, United States
- Coordinates: 31°36′42″N 111°02′52″W
- Elevation: 3,500 ft (1,100 m)
- Established: 1958
- Administrator: Arizona State Parks & Trails and Friends of Tubac Presidio State Historic Park and Museum
- Visitors: 3,884 (in 2024)
- Website: Official website

Tubac Presidio State Historic Park, located in Tubac, Arizona, United States, preserves the ruins of the Presidio San Ignacio de Tubac and various other buildings, thereby presenting a timeline of European settlement in this Southern Arizona town. The park contains a museum, a number of historic sites, an underground archeology exhibit displaying the excavated foundations of the Tubac Presidio, and a picnic area. Various cultural events are held on-site throughout the year including Anza Days in October.

Until recently, the park was administered by Arizona State Parks and is the first park in the Arizona state park system. As a result of budget cutbacks, the Tubac Presidio was scheduled to be closed in 2010, but was rescued by local residents and the Tubac Historical Society. It is now operated by The Friends of the Presidio, a 501 (c)(3) nonprofit and staffed with dedicated volunteers.

== History ==
As the Spanish Empire attempted to expand into the frontiers of New Spain, Catholic missions were established throughout modern-day Mexico and the southwestern United States. Of these many churches, one was established at nearby Tumacácori in 1691 and Tubac, then a small Pima Indian village, was set up as a mission farm and ranch. Spanish colonists started to colonize the area in the 1730s; twenty years later the Pimas, led by Luis of Saric, led an uprising against the Spanish in 1751 and the settlement at Tubac was destroyed. A year later, the Pimas surrendered and the Presidio San Ignacio de Tubac was established to protect the town and the surrounding area from further rebellion. Tubac became the first European settlement in what today is the state of Arizona.

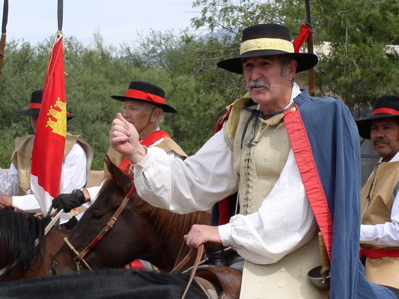
Reenactment of the arrival of de Anza at Tubac, Arizona during Anza Days at Tubac Presidio State Historic Park.

Threatened by the establishment of a Russian fort immediately north of the San Francisco Bay area, the Spanish sent Juan Bautista de Anza to establish an overland route to and a presidio and mission in the San Francisco area. The expedition passed through Tubac in early 1774. In 1776, the Tubac garrison was moved north to Tucson, leaving Tubac undefended against Apache raids. As a result, the presidio was reactivated in 1787 with Pima\O'odham Indian troops and Spanish officers.

Tubac became part of an independent Mexico in 1821 and then part of the United States in 1854 as a result of the Gadsden Purchase. With the arrival of the Americans came Charles D. Poston, who established the Sonora Exploring and Mining Company in Tubac. Poston performed marriages, granted divorces, officiated baptisms, printed his own money to pay his employees, and even established Arizona's first newspaper in 1859. The following year, Tubac became the largest town in the state. The prosperity was not to last, however, as the area's soldiers were called away to fight in the American Civil War. The town was again unprotected from the Apaches. The routing of the railroad through Tucson to the north and the discovery of silver around Tombstone to the east meant that Tubac would never regain its importance.

== Park facilities and events ==
The centerpiece of the exhibits at Tubac Presidio State Historic Park is the underground display of the presidio's foundations. Excavated in 1974 by archeologists from the University of Arizona, portions of the presidio's foundation and walls can be viewed by visitors. Visitors may also enter the furnished 1885 schoolhouse, complete with desks, chalkboards, and a potbelly stove. Other buildings on site include the 1914 Otero Hall, which houses exhibitions, a visitor center, the Rojas House, occupied by the same family for about one hundred years, and a museum with displays from the various historic periods of settlement in Tubac, including American Indian (pre-1752), Spanish Colonial (1752–1821), Mexican Republic (1821–1854), and Anglo Territorial (1854–1912). Adjacent to the park grounds is St. Ann's Church, which was built on the ruins of the former Iglésia de Santa Gertrudis, and the trailhead of the Tubac-to-Tumacácori portion of the Juan Bautista de Anza National Historic Trail.

Every October, the park hosts Anza Days to commemorate the arrival of Juan Bautista de Anza at the Tubac Presidio. The Anza Trail Color Guard arrive from nearby Tumacácori and discuss de Anza's trip to San Francisco.

== Gallery ==
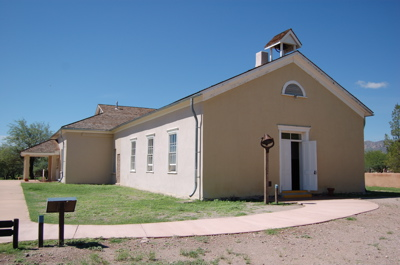
Exterior of the Old Tubac Schoolhouse

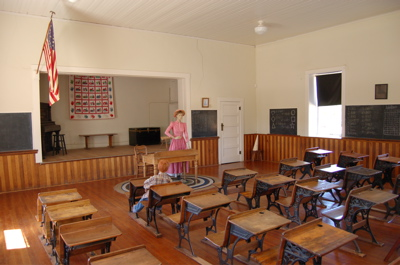
Interior of the Old Tubac Schoolhouse

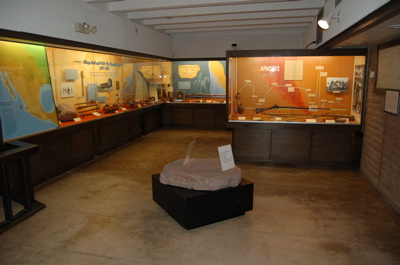
Interior of Museum at Tubac Presidio State Historic Park

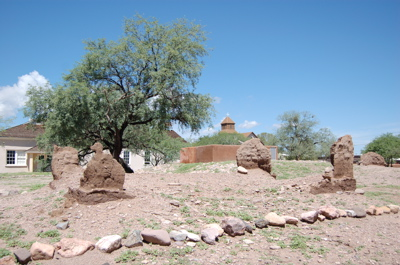
Adobe Ruins of Tubac Presidio. Above-ground ruins date from the early 1900s while below-ground foundations are from the mid- to late 1700s

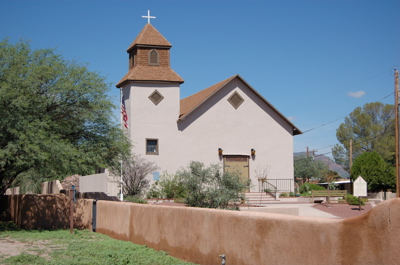
St. Ann's Church (adjacent to park grounds) built on the ruins of the former Iglésia de Santa Gertrudis

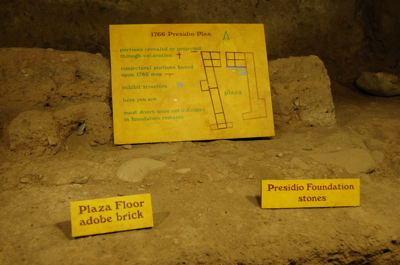
Underground archeology exhibit of the foundation of the Tubac Presidio
