= Patagonia Lake =

Reservoir in Santa Cruz County, Arizona, US

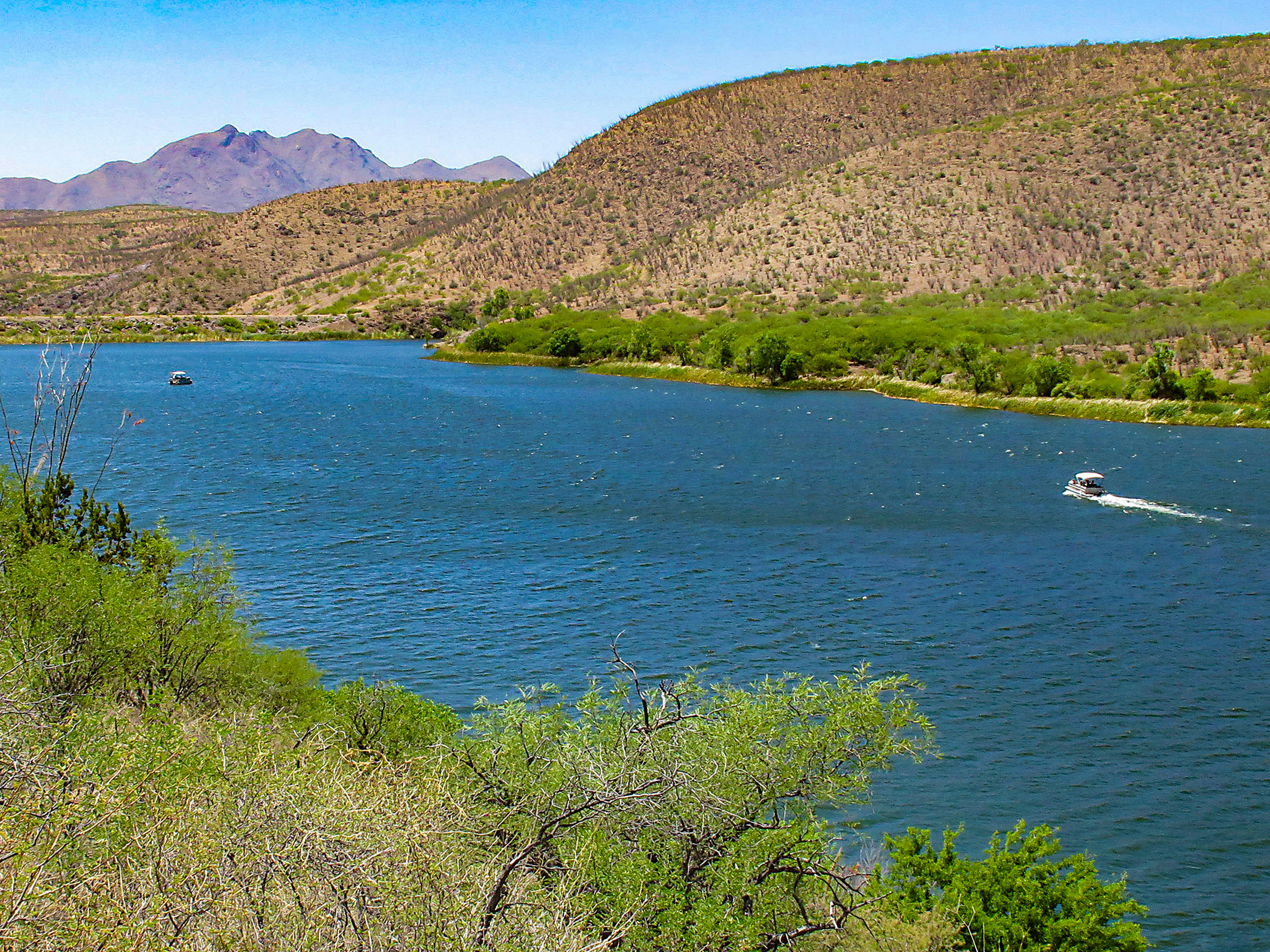
- Patagonia Lake, May 2018

- Location within Arizona
- Location: Santa Cruz County, Arizona; United States
- Coordinates: 31°29′42″N 110°51′34″W
- Type: reservoir
- Primary inflows: Sonoita Creek
- Primary outflows: Sonoita Creek
- Basin countries: United States
- Managing agency: Arizona State Parks
- Surface area: 265 acres (107 ha)
- Average depth: 90 ft (27 m)
- Max. depth: 120 ft (37 m)
- Surface elevation: 4,050 ft (1,230 m)
- Settlements: Patagonia

Patagonia Lake is a man-made reservoir in Santa Cruz County, Arizona, United States, located southwest of the town of Patagonia, Arizona and northeast of Nogales. The lake was created by damming Sonoita Creek, and is a popular area for boating and sport fishing. Facilities are maintained by Arizona State Parks as part of Patagonia Lake State Park.

== Fish species ==
Reproducing fish species located in Patagonia Lake are largemouth bass, black crappie, bluegill, green sunfish, flathead catfish, threadfin shad, redear sunfish, channel catfish, and American bullfrogs. Rainbow trout are stocked every three weeks from October to March.

== See also ==
- List of dams and reservoirs in Arizona
