= Slide Rock State Park =

State park in Arizona, United States

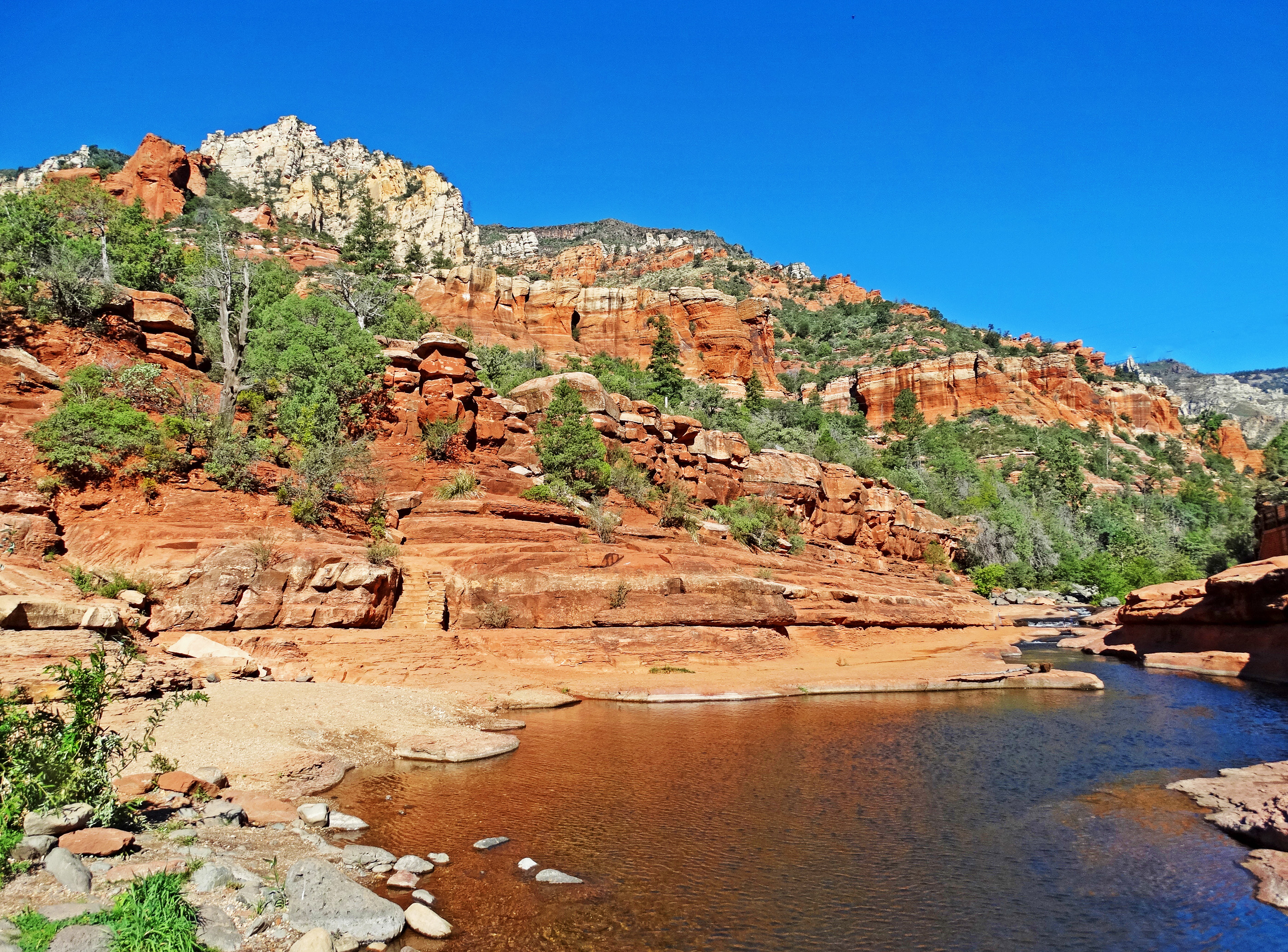

- Location within Arizona
- Location: Coconino County, Arizona, United States
- Coordinates: 34°56′40″N 111°45′10″W
- Area: 43 acres (17 ha)
- Elevation: 4,930 ft (1,500 m)
- Established: 1985
- Administrator: Arizona State Parks & Trails; United States Forest Service
- Visitors: 278,330 (in 2024)
- Website: Official website

Slide Rock State Park is an Arizona State Park located in Oak Creek Canyon 7 miles (11 km) north of Sedona, Arizona, United States. It takes its name from a natural water slide formed by the slippery bed of Oak Creek. Slide Rock State Park is located on Coconino National Forest land and is co-managed by the Arizona State Parks agency and the United States Forest Service. Tall red rock formations that are typical of the region also surround the park, which contains a 43-acre (17 ha) working apple farm. Slide Rock State Park is one of the most visited tourist attractions in Arizona, regularly attracting over a quarter of a million annual visitors (278,330 in 2024).

== History ==
The land was first developed by Frank L. Pendley, who arrived in the canyon in 1907 and acquired title to the land under the Homestead Act in 1910. Pendley developed an irrigation system which is still in use today and planted an apple orchard in 1912. The state completed a road through the canyon in 1914, and Pendley built rustic tourist cabins in 1933 that in part survive today.

The park was purchased by Arizona State Parks from the Arizona Parklands Foundation on July 10, 1985, and officially dedicated as Slide Rock State Park in October 1987. The Pendley Homestead Historic District was accepted onto the National Register of Historic Places on December 23, 1991. The apple farm is one of the few homesteads still preserved in Oak Creek Canyon.

Films shot in the area include Angel and the Badman (1946), Broken Arrow (1950), Drum Beat (1954), and Gun Fury (1953).

== Recreation ==
There are three hiking trails in Slide Rock State Park: Pendley Homestead Trail (.25 mile), Slide Rock Route (.3 mile) and Clifftop Nature Trail (.25 mile).

== Gallery ==
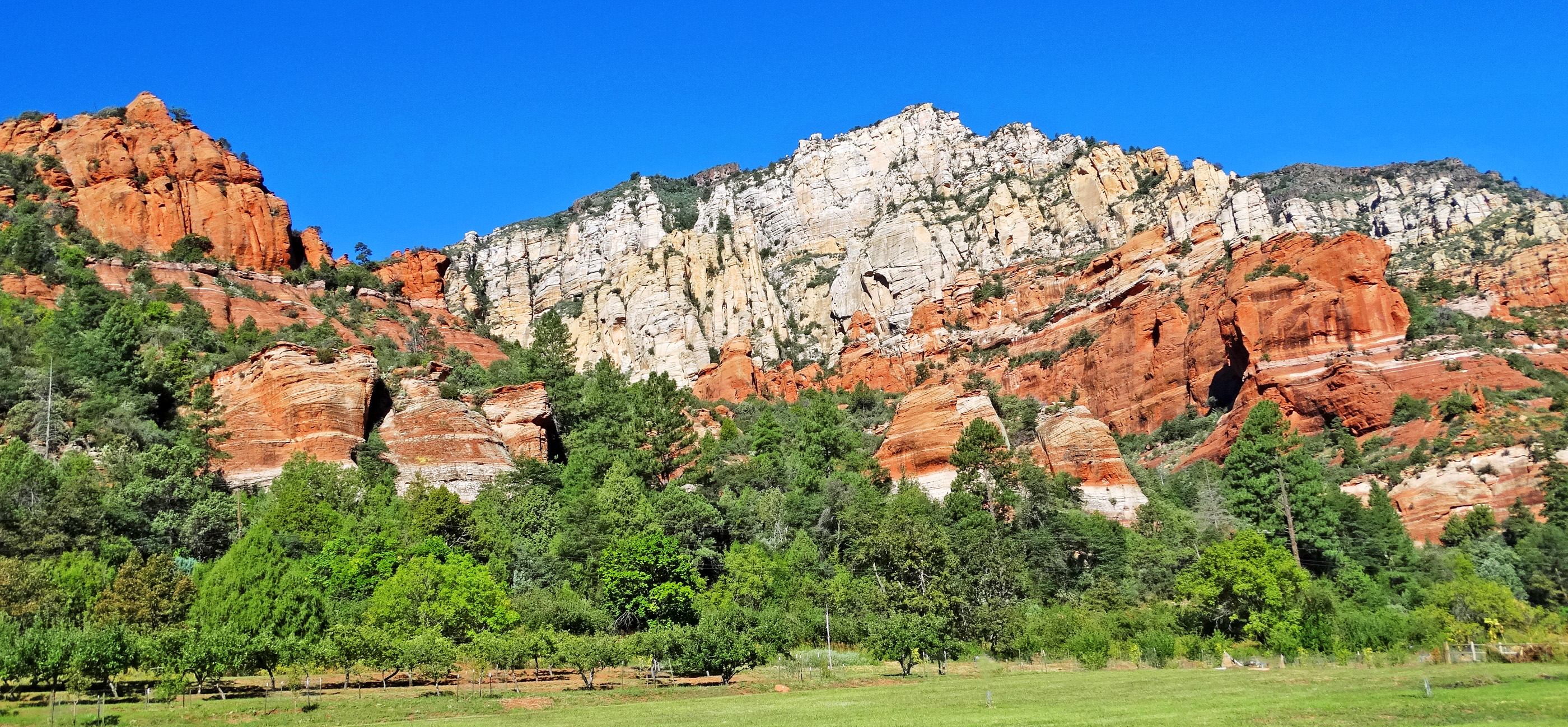
Oak Creek Canyon

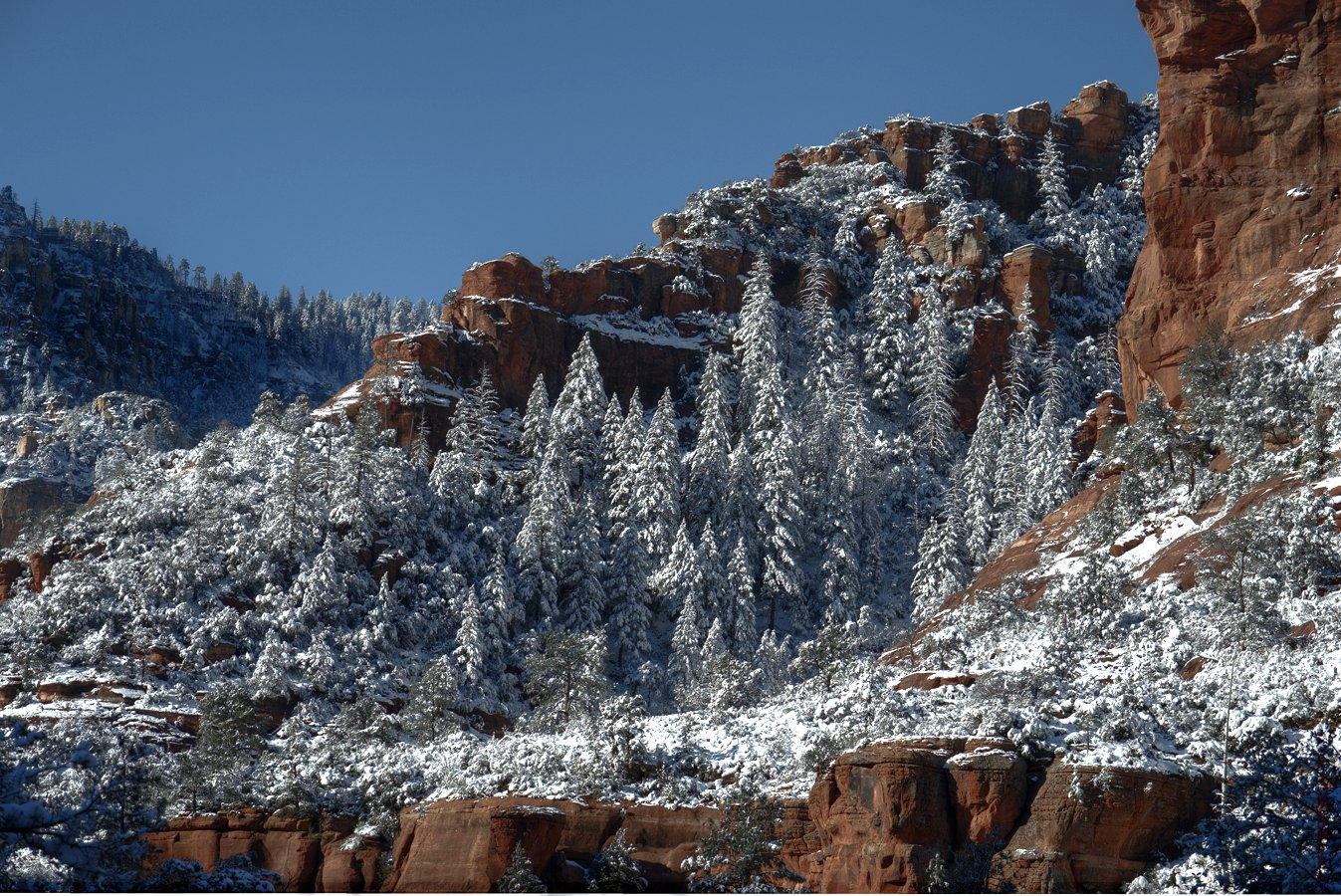
Slide Rock State Park during the 2011 winter season

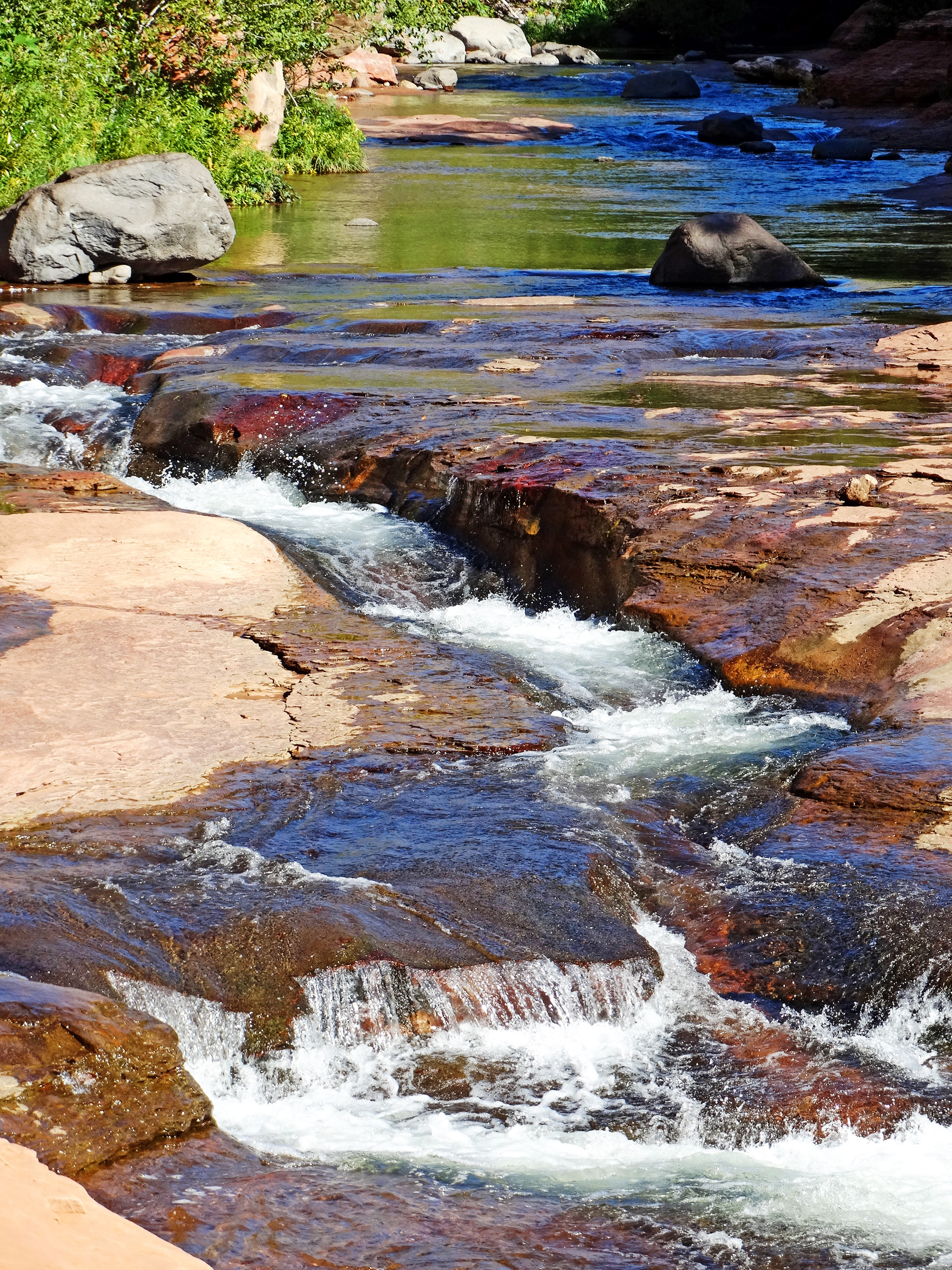
Oak Creek Cascades

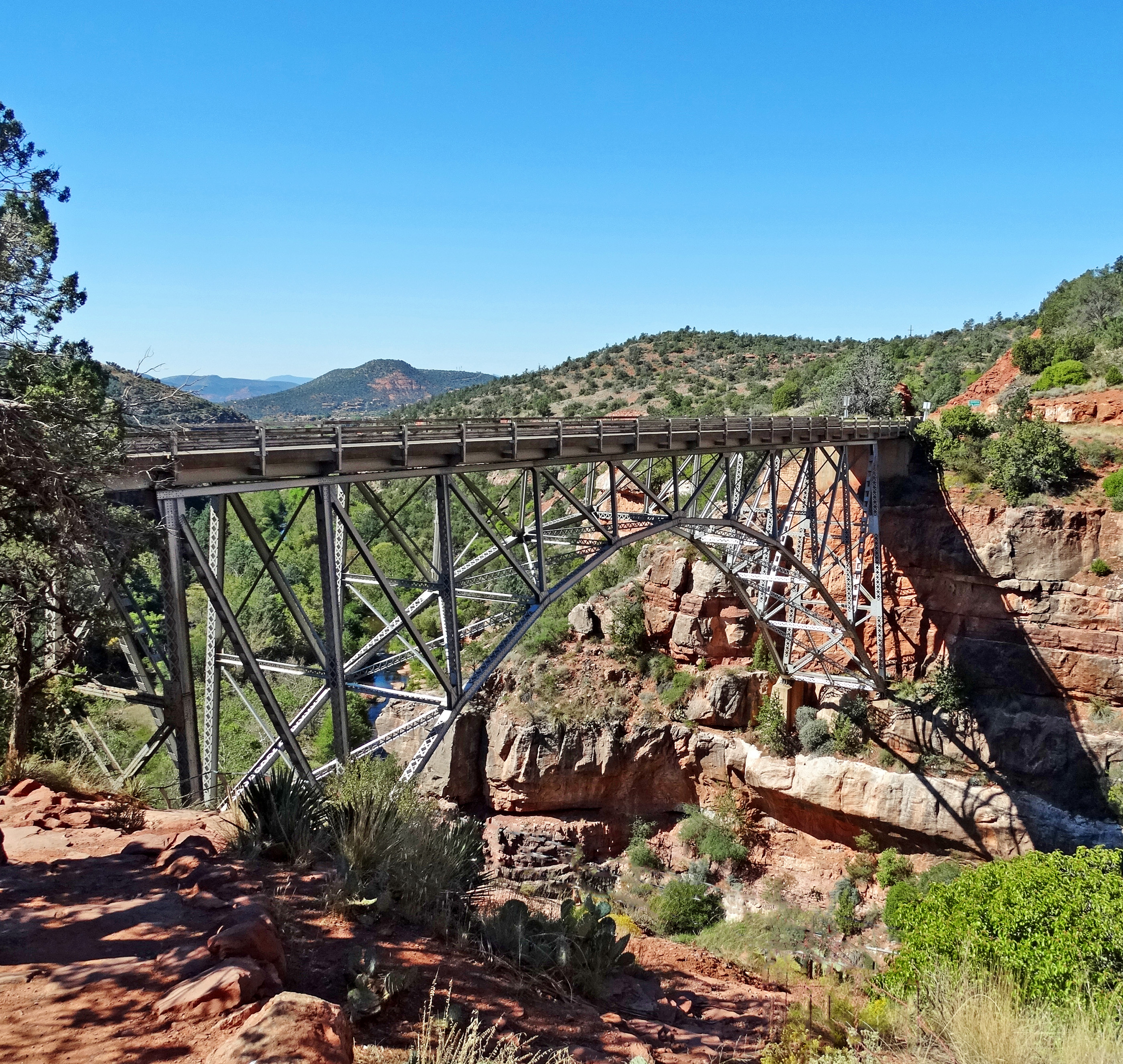
Midgley Bridge

== See also ==
- Schnebly Hill Formation
