= Dead Horse Ranch State Park =

Protected area in Yavapai County, Arizona

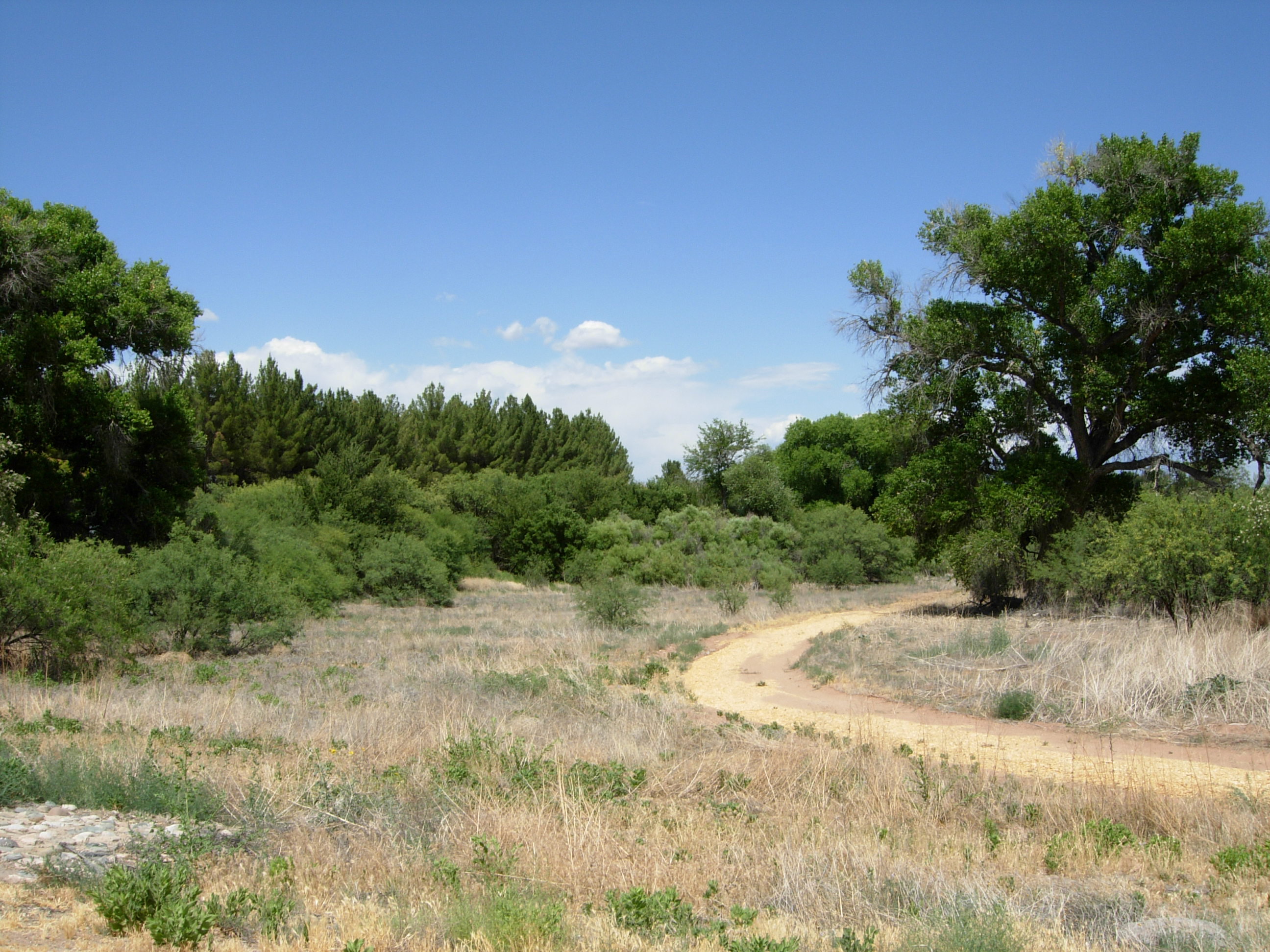

- Location within Arizona
- Interactive map of Dead Horse Ranch State Park
- Location: Yavapai County, Arizona, United States
- Coordinates: 34°45′11″N 112°01′20″W
- Area: 423 acres (171 ha)
- Elevation: 3,300 ft (1,000 m)
- Established: 1972
- Administrator: Arizona State Parks & Trails
- Visitors: 126,072 (in 2024)
- Website: Official website

Dead Horse Ranch State Park is a state park of Arizona, United States, on the Verde River in an area known as the Verde River Greenway. Located at approximately 3,300 feet (1,000 m) elevation, Dead Horse Ranch State Park covers 423 acres (1.71 km^{2}) of land with 10 miles (16 km) of hiking trails, 150 campground sites and several picnic areas, along with 23 group camping sites. It also offers trailhead access to the Dead Horse Trail System, located on adjacent Coconino National Forest land. The ranch was originally named by the Ireys family, who sold the land to the state of Arizona to become a state park.

== Events ==
The annual Verde Valley Birding and Nature Festival, the "Birdy Verde", with emphasis on birdwatching, is held each April. In 2010, about 70 field trips were offered for the four-day event, many led by nationally recognized experts. Headquarters for the festival is at Dead Horse Ranch, but events are held throughout the Verde Valley.

Verde River Day is held annually in September at the park to celebrate the protection of the river's riparian habitat.
