= Cattail Cove State Park =

Park in Mohave County, Arizona

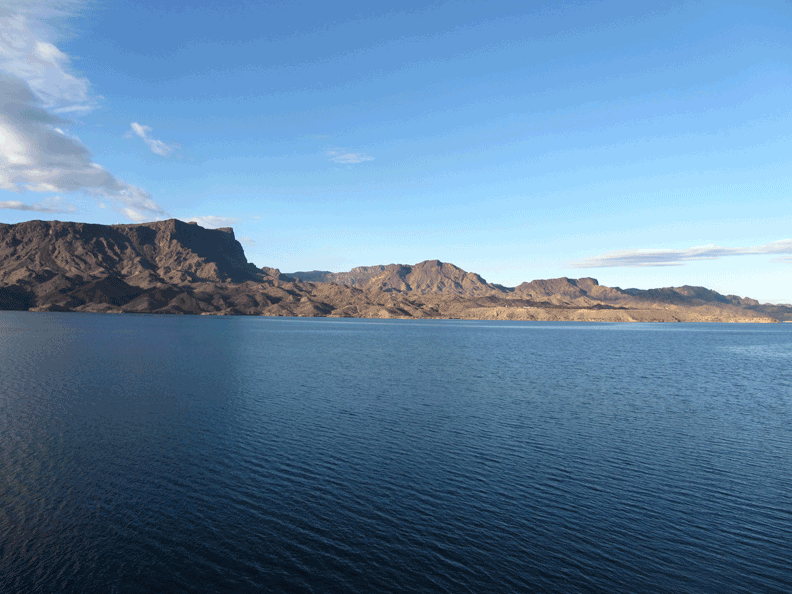

- Location within Arizona
- Interactive map of Cattail Cove State Park
- Location: Mohave County, Arizona, United States
- Coordinates: 34°21′18″N 114°09′57″W
- Area: 2,000 acres (810 ha)
- Elevation: 450 ft (140 m)
- Established: 1970
- Administrator: Arizona State Parks & Trails
- Visitors: 53,576 (in 2024)
- Website: Official website

Cattail Cove State Park is a state park of Arizona, United States, on the shore of Lake Havasu. The park is located on Arizona State Route 95 in far southern Mohave County, about 19 miles (31 km) from Lake Havasu City and 8 miles (13 km) from Parker Strip. The park is public land managed by the Arizona State Parks, and available to the public for recreational purposes.
