= Red Rock State Park =

Protected area in Arizona, United States

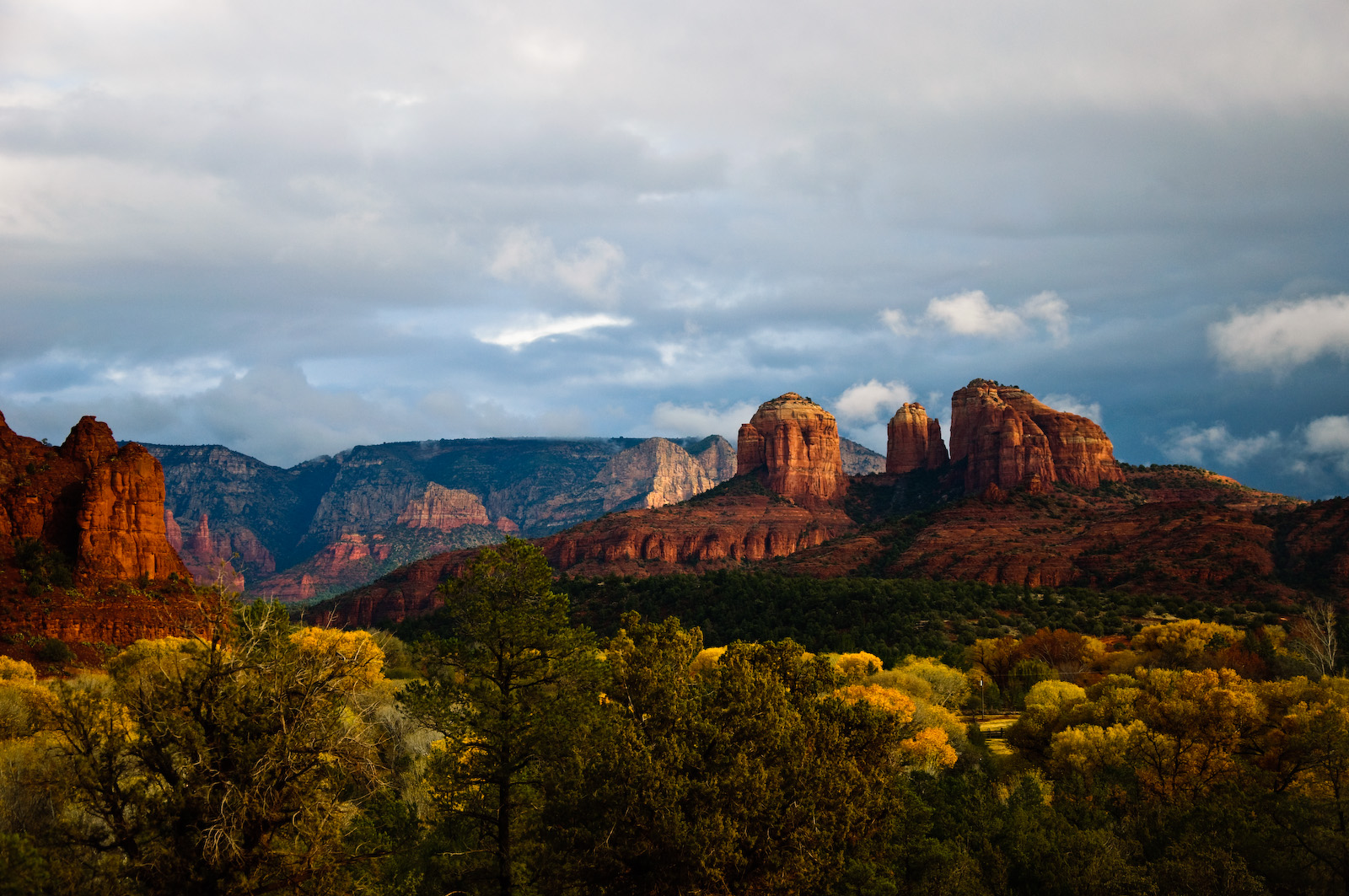
- Looking west-northwest toward Cathedral Rock and the Mogollon Rim

- Location within Arizona
- Location: Yavapai County, Arizona, United States
- Coordinates: 34°49′08″N 111°50′12″W
- Area: 286 acres (116 ha)
- Elevation: 3,990 ft (1,220 m)
- Established: 1986
- Administrator: Arizona State Parks & Trails
- Visitors: 51,950 (in 2024)
- Website: Official website

Red Rock State Park is a 286-acre (116 ha) state park of Arizona, United States, featuring a red sandstone canyon five miles (8.0 km) southwest the city of Sedona. The main mission of this day-use park is the preservation of the riparian habitat along Oak Creek. Red Rock State Park serves as an environmental education facility for the public and for school or private groups, and provides limited passive recreational opportunities.

== Natural history ==
Red Rock State Park includes a 1.4-mile (2.3 km) stretch of Oak Creek, which upstream flows through Oak Creek Canyon in Coconino National Forest. The rich riparian zone along the creek supports a diverse array of species. Trees in this habitat include Fremont cottonwood, Arizona sycamore, velvet ash, and Arizona alder. Oak Creek supports rare native fish, several frog species, and the threatened Sonora mud turtle.

Away from the creek the dominant trees are velvet mesquite, netleaf hackberry, Utah juniper, and alligator juniper. Bird species found in the area include the common black hawk, wood duck, and common merganser. Lower Oak Creek, which includes the state park, has been designated an Important Bird Area. Large mammals include the cougar, coyote, mule deer, collared peccary, and river otter. Introduced species found in the park include giant reed, tamarisk, Johnson grass, and tumbleweed.

== Cultural history ==
Red Rock State Park was previously a part of a ranch, Smoke Trail Ranch. In 1941 it was purchased by Jack Frye, then-president of Trans World Airlines, as a southwestern retreat for himself and his wife Helen. Helen Frye maintained the property for many years after Jack's death in 1959. In the early 1970s she sold 330 acres (130 ha) to a real estate development company, who planned to build a resort complex. The deal fell through from lack of funds. In 1976 the property was transferred to Eckankar, a new religious movement that Helen Frye belonged to, who planned a private retreat for their members.

In the fall on 1980 a group of friends hiking along Oak Creek were informed by an Eckankar representative that they were trespassing on private property. The group happened to include Bruce Babbitt, then-governor of Arizona. Concerned about loss of public access along waterways, Babbitt researched the property and noted its potential for a full-fledged state park. After determining the willingness of all parties involved, Babbitt pursued a three-way land exchange: Eckankar would sell 286 acres (116 ha) of the Smoke Trail Ranch to Anamax Mining Company (owner of the Twin Buttes mine), who would donate the land to the state in exchange for 3,947 acres (1,597 ha) of Arizona State Land Department property they had been leasing in Pima County. Since state law only provided for such exchanges within a county, the Arizona Legislature had to pass new legislation allowing trans-county trades. The enabling law and the transfers were completed in 1981.

Development was slowed by budget cuts in the following years and a new land exchange with the federal government involving Red Rock and Lake Havasu State Park. Red Rock State Park opened to the public and was dedicated on October 19, 1991.

=== Motion pictures ===
Red Rock State Park has been featured in movies including Rocky Mountain (1950), Fort Defiance (1950), Red Mountain (1951), Escape from Fort Bravo (1953), Fort Massacre (1957), A Distant Trumpet (1963), The Hallelujah Trail (1965), and The Legend of the Boy and the Eagle (1967).

== Recreation ==
The park's visitor center contains interpretive exhibits, a movie theater, Junior Ranger Programs, and a gift shop. There are several ramadas which can be reserved for private events, including weddings. Red Rock State Park has a network of trails totaling 5 miles (8.0 km). From the park visitors can access mountain biking and horseback riding trails on adjacent U.S. Forest Service land.

== See also ==
- Schnebly Hill Formation
