= Riordan Mansion State Historic Park =

Protected area in Flagstaff, Arizona, US

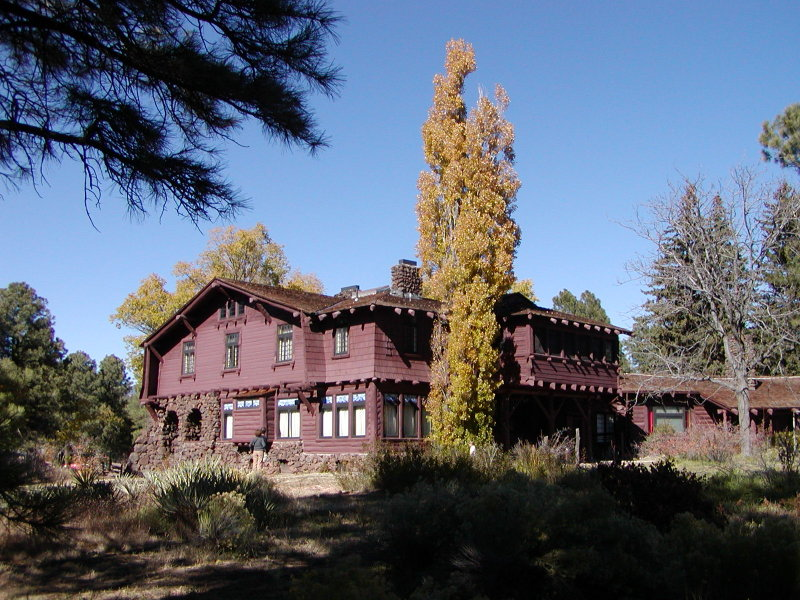

- Location within Arizona
- Location: Flagstaff, Arizona, United States
- Coordinates: 35°11′16″N 111°39′29″W
- Area: 5 acres (2.0 ha)
- Elevation: 6,900 ft (2,100 m)
- Established: 1978
- Administrator: Arizona State Parks & Trails
- Visitors: 12,273 (in 2024)
- Website: Official website

Riordan Mansion State Historic Park is a historic site in Flagstaff, Arizona, bordering Northern Arizona University, that preserves the duplex mansion of lumber barons Timothy and Michael Riordan.

== Origin ==
This park features the duplex home of Timothy and Michael Riordan, lumber baron brothers who married sisters, Caroline and Elizabeth Metz. The brothers were members of an important Arizona Territorial family who played a role in the development of Flagstaff and northern Arizona and were involved in lumber, railroads, cattle, banking, and politics.

Cooperatively the Riordan brothers built their thirteen thousand square foot mansion in 1904 while Arizona was still a territory. The home consisted of two similar six thousand square foot wings for each family, connected by a large common room.

Charles Whittlesey was the architect for the Riordan homes. He also was the architect for the El Tovar Hotel at the Grand Canyon. Architectural similarities between the structures can be found in the massive stone arches at porch corners as well as exterior elements that reflect the surrounding landscape like log planks, wood shingles, and native stone.

== Park history ==
On November 15, 1978, after over a year of planning and negotiations, Arizona State Parks received a warranty deed conveying the Riordan homes, much of their contents and 5 acres (2.0 ha) of land surrounding the structures for state park purposes.

The public opening of the Park was held on August 4, 1983, and only included the Timothy A. Riordan (east) side of the house. This was the results of cooperative efforts of the family owner, Robert Chambers, who had died in 1980, and the Arizona State Park board members and personnel. On April 27, 2002, the Michael J. Riordan (west) side was opened for self-guided tours. (Note: The park was scheduled to close on February 22, 2010, for an undetermined amount of time due to state budget cutting, but its contract with the Arizona State Parks system was renewed for another three years under the condition it self-funded. The Riordan Action Network Group, a team of local volunteers, fund-raised to keep the park open and pay the staff salaries. In the wake of the threatened closure, the park maintained very few staff and relied on volunteers to maintain the mansion and provide educational tours.)
