= Lake Havasu =

Human-made reservoir on the Colorado River in Arizona and California, United States

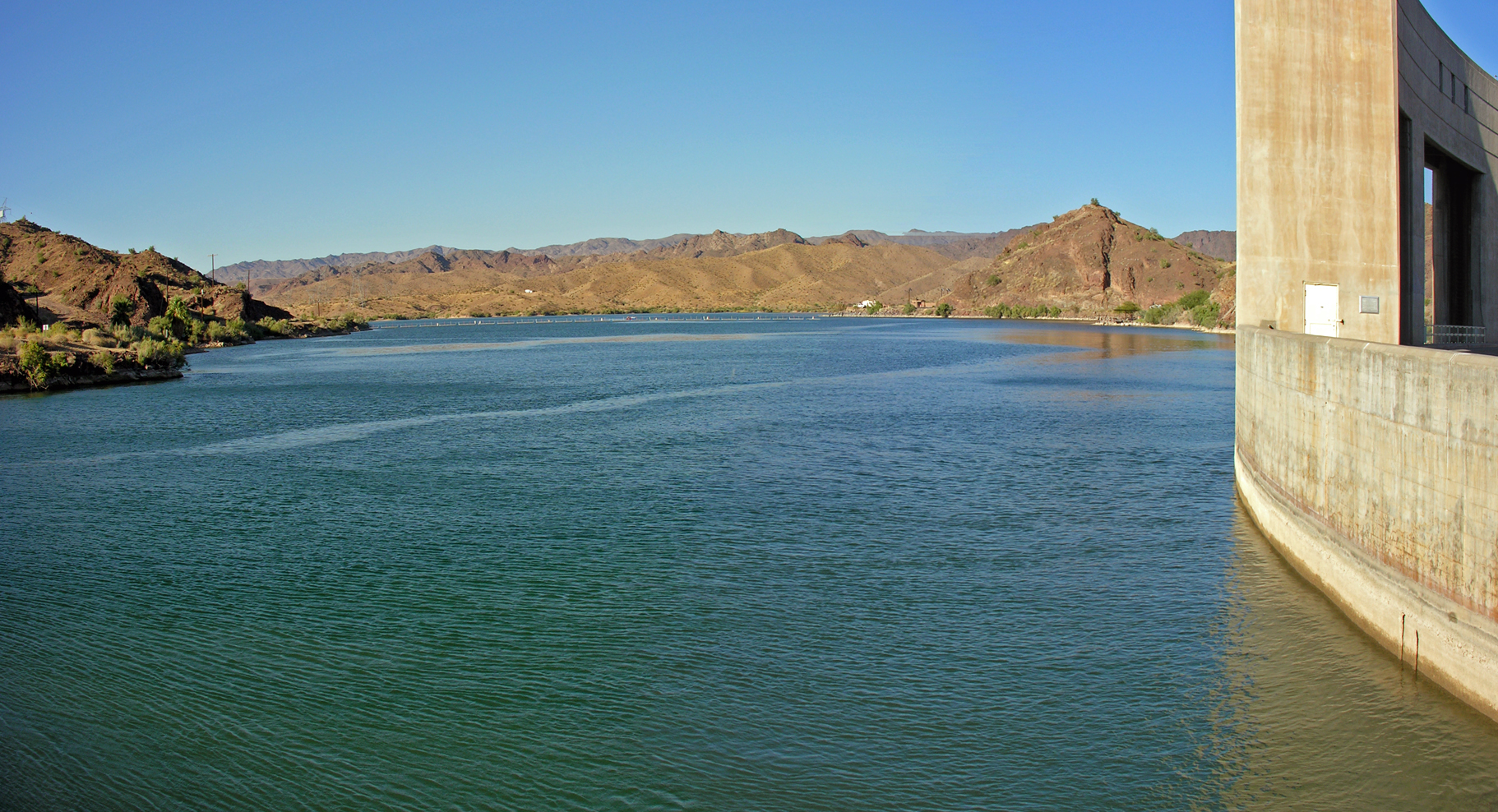
- View of the lake from Parker Dam

- Location within California Location within Arizona Location within the United States
- Location: Arizona, California
- Coordinates: 34°29′N 114°23′W
- Type: Reservoir
- Primary inflows: Colorado River
- Primary outflows: Colorado River
- Basin countries: United States
- Max. length: 26.3 miles (42.3 km)
- Max. width: 2.85 miles (4.59 km)
- Surface area: 19,300 acres (7,800 ha)
- Average depth: 35 ft (11 m)
- Max. depth: 90 ft (27 m)
- Surface elevation: 448 ft (137 m)
- Islands: 1
- Settlements: Lake Havasu City, Arizona

Lake Havasu (/ˈhɑːvəsuː/ HAH-və-soo) is a large reservoir formed by Parker Dam on the Colorado River, on the border between San Bernardino County, California, and Mohave County, Arizona. Lake Havasu City sits on the Arizonan side of the lake with its Californian counterpart of Havasu Lake directly across the lake. The reservoir has an available capacity of 619,400 acre-feet (0.7640 km^{3}). The concrete arch dam was built by the United States Bureau of Reclamation between 1934 and 1938. The lake's primary purpose is to store water for pumping into two aqueducts. Prior to the dam construction, the area was home to the Mojave people. The lake was named (in 1939) after the Mojave word for blue. In the early 19th century, it was frequented by beaver trappers. Spaniards also began to mine the areas along the river.

Lake Havasu is legally and structurally mandated to maintain a near-constant water elevation between 445 and 450 feet, even during severe Colorado River droughts. As a critical extraction point for major aqueducts, upstream reservoirs like Lake Mead and Lake Powell must absorb basin-wide water deficits to keep Lake Havasu functional.

== Aqueducts ==
Mark Wilmer Pumping Plant pumps water into the Central Arizona Project Aqueduct. Whitsett Pumping Plant is located on the lake, and lifts the water 291 feet (89 m) for the Colorado River Aqueduct. Gene Pumping Plant, south of Gene Wash Reservoir, is west-southwest of Parker Dam and gives the water an additional boost of 303 feet (92 m). The Colorado River Aqueduct has three more pumping plants: Iron Mountain (144 feet (44 m)), Eagle Mountain (438 feet (134 m)), and Julian Hinds (441 feet (134 m)). The total lift is 1,617 feet (493 m).

== Natural history ==
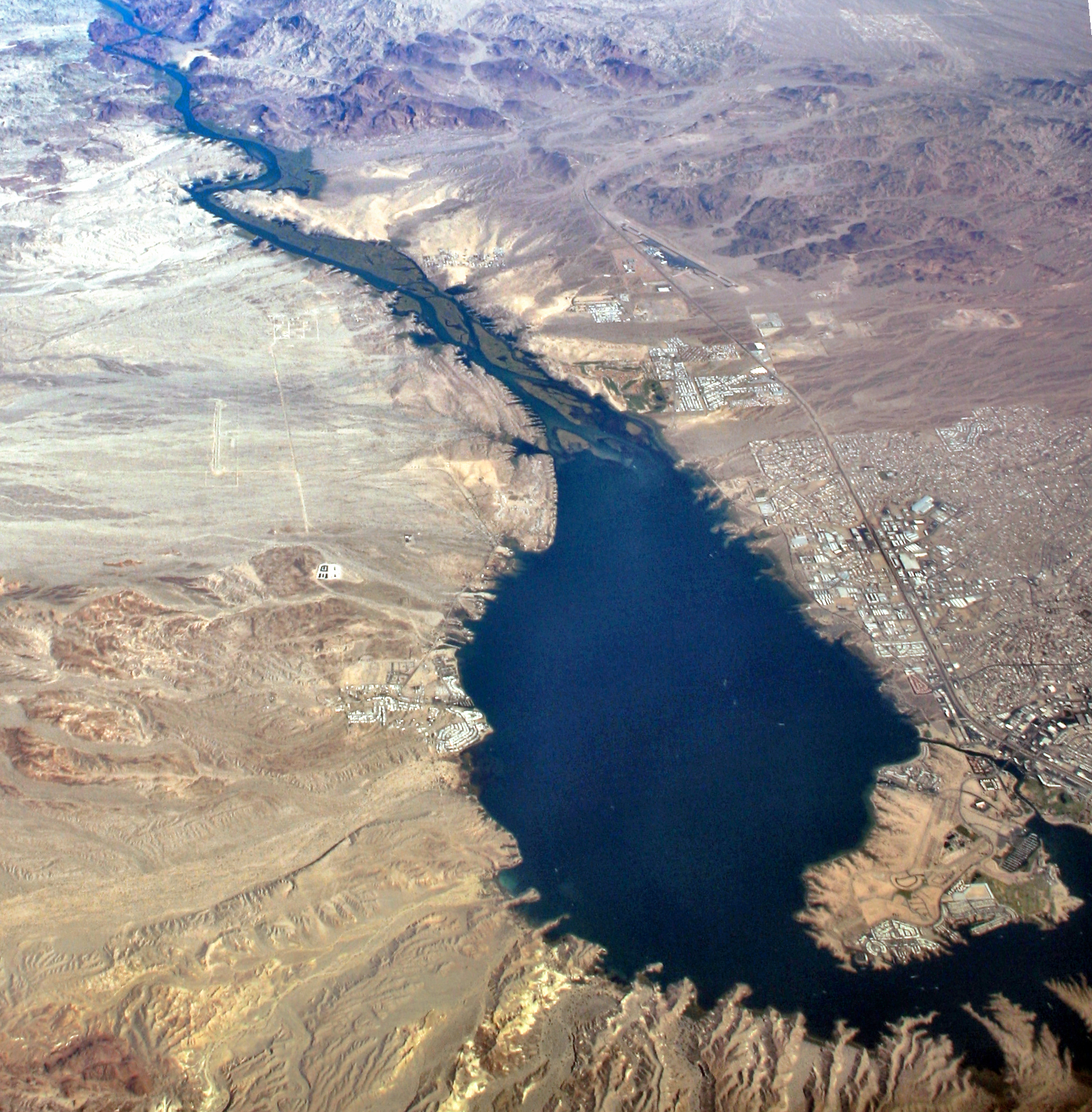
Lake Havasu with Lake Havasu City, Arizona on the east shore (right) and Havasu Lake, California on the western shore (left).

The shorelines are in the ecotone (transition zone) of the higher Mojave Desert to the lower Sonoran Desert and its Californian Colorado Desert ecoregions.

Havasu National Wildlife Refuge is located at the upper end and upriver. Lake Havasu State Park is along the eastern shore in Arizona. The Bill Williams River National Wildlife Refuge extends southeastward up the riparian zone of the Bill Williams River canyon from the southeastern end of the reservoir and dam.

=== Fish ===
Lake Havasu is well known for its recreational fishing and boating, which bring in about a million visitors a year. Fishing tournaments are often held on the lake, where bass are the main catch.

Fish list : Largemouth bass, smallmouth bass, striped bass, carp, channel catfish, flathead catfish, crappie, razorback sucker, sunfish, and redear sunfish.

White sturgeon were stocked in Lake Havasu in 1967 and 1968 from stock obtained from San Pablo Bay, California. While some dead sturgeon were found downstream from Havasu (probably killed during passage over dams), living fish have not been recorded, but may still exist along the southern end of Lake Havasu near Parker Dam.

The California Office of Environmental Health Hazard Assessment (OEHHA) has developed a safe eating advisory for Lake Havasu based on levels of mercury found in fish caught from this water body.

== Recreation ==
The Bureau of Land Management operates 73 campsites on the eastern shore of Lake Havasu. Arizona State Parks operates Lake Havasu State Park and Cattail Cove State Park on the eastern shore of the lake. The northern part of the lake is included in the Havasu National Wildlife Refuge.

Havasu Springs Resort, a BLM concession, operates on the south edge of Lake Havasu. Black Meadow Landing, another BLM concession, operates on the west bank of the lake.

== See also ==
- Lake Havasu City, Arizona
- Robert P. McCulloch
- London Bridge (Lake Havasu City)
- List of dams and reservoirs in California
- List of lakes in California
- List of largest reservoirs of California
- Windsor Beach, Lake Havasu

== Image gallery ==
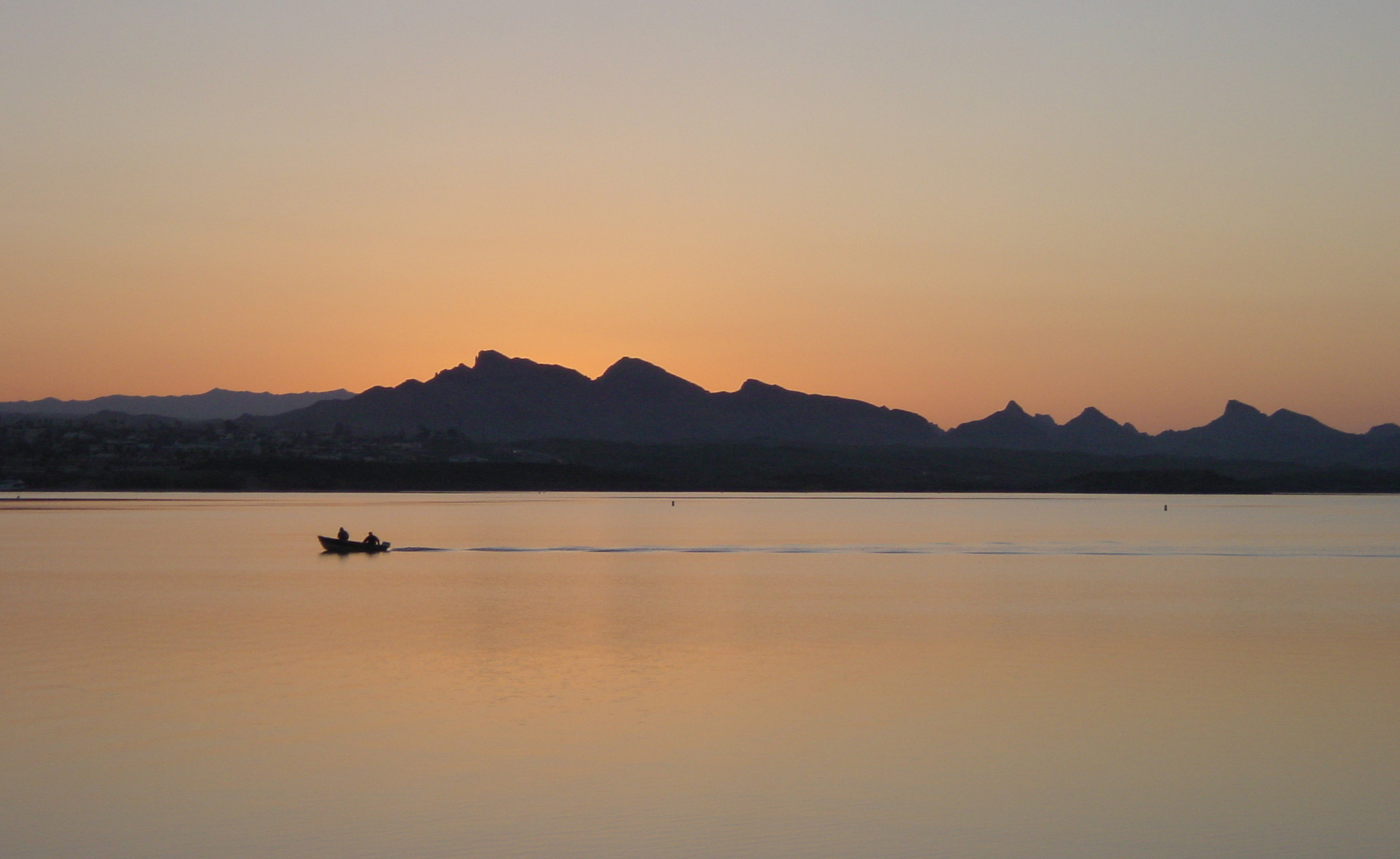
Early-morning fishing on Lake Havasu

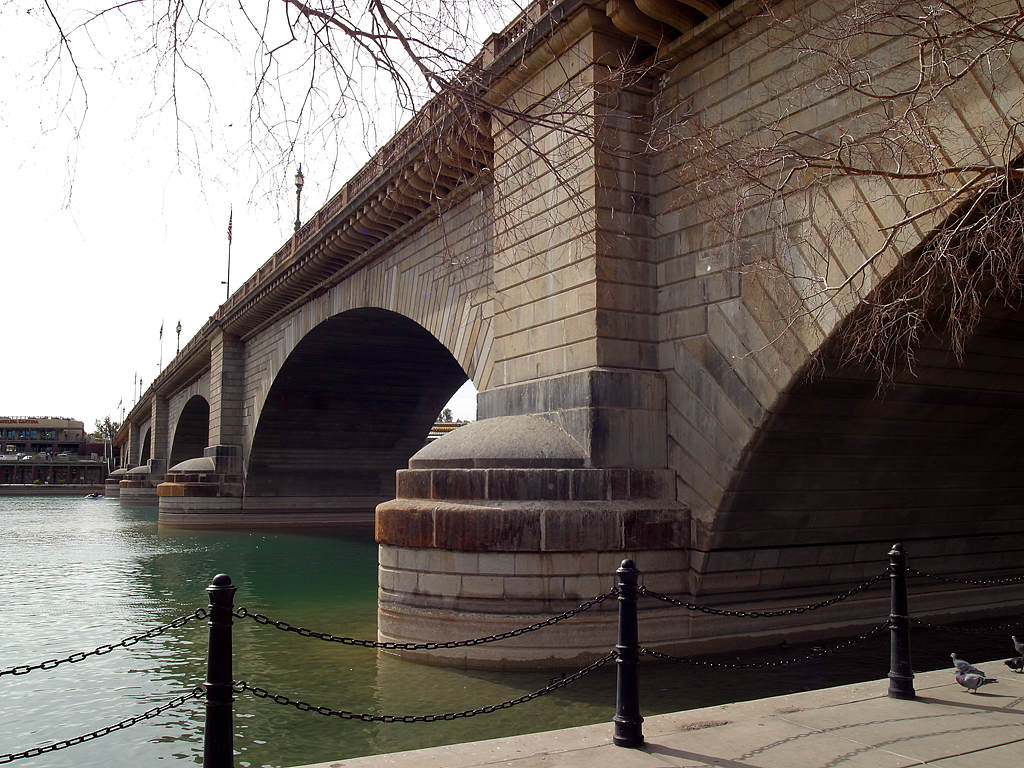
London Bridge at Lake Havasu.

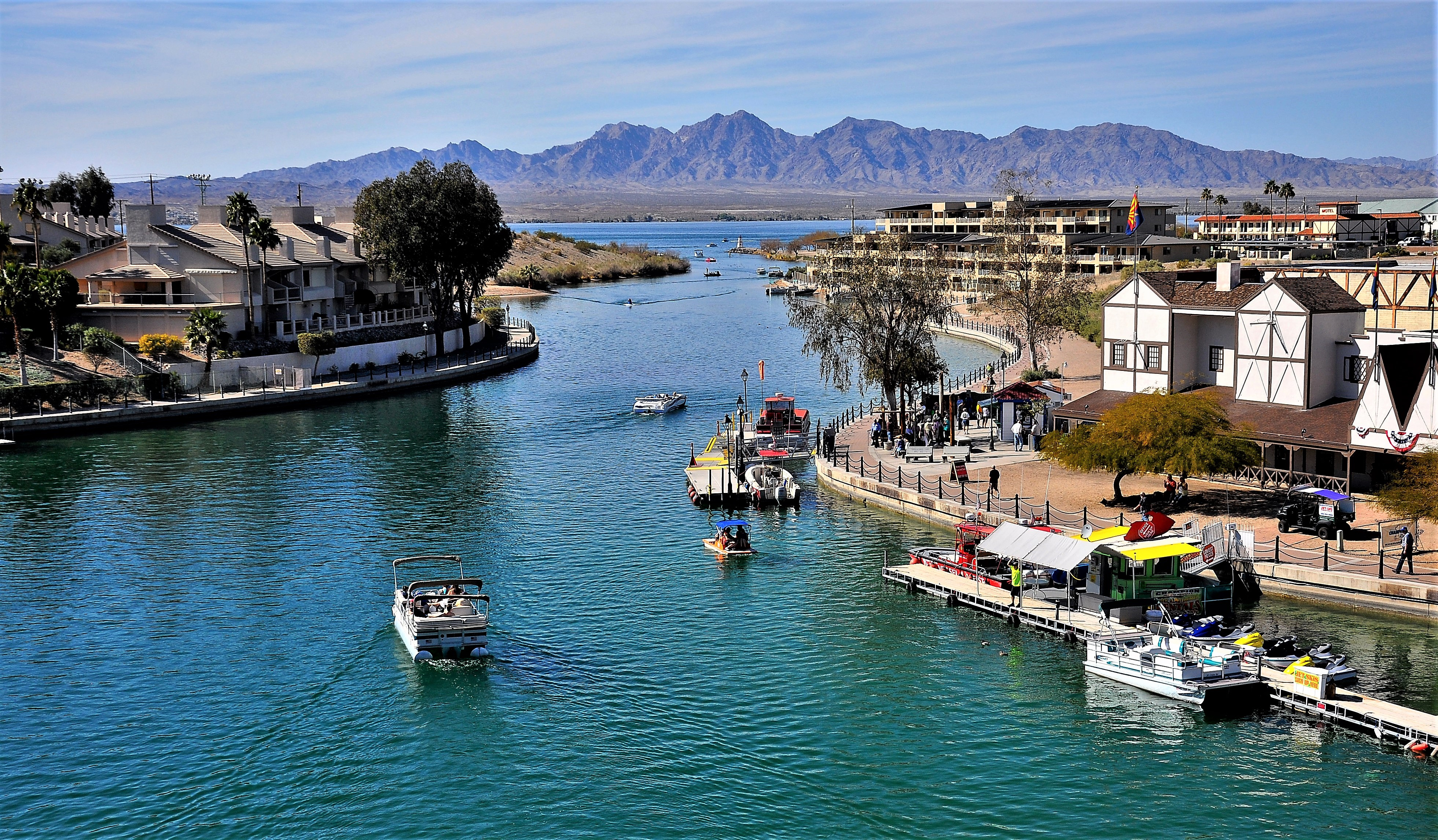
View from London Bridge
