= Roper Lake State Park =

State park in Arizona, US

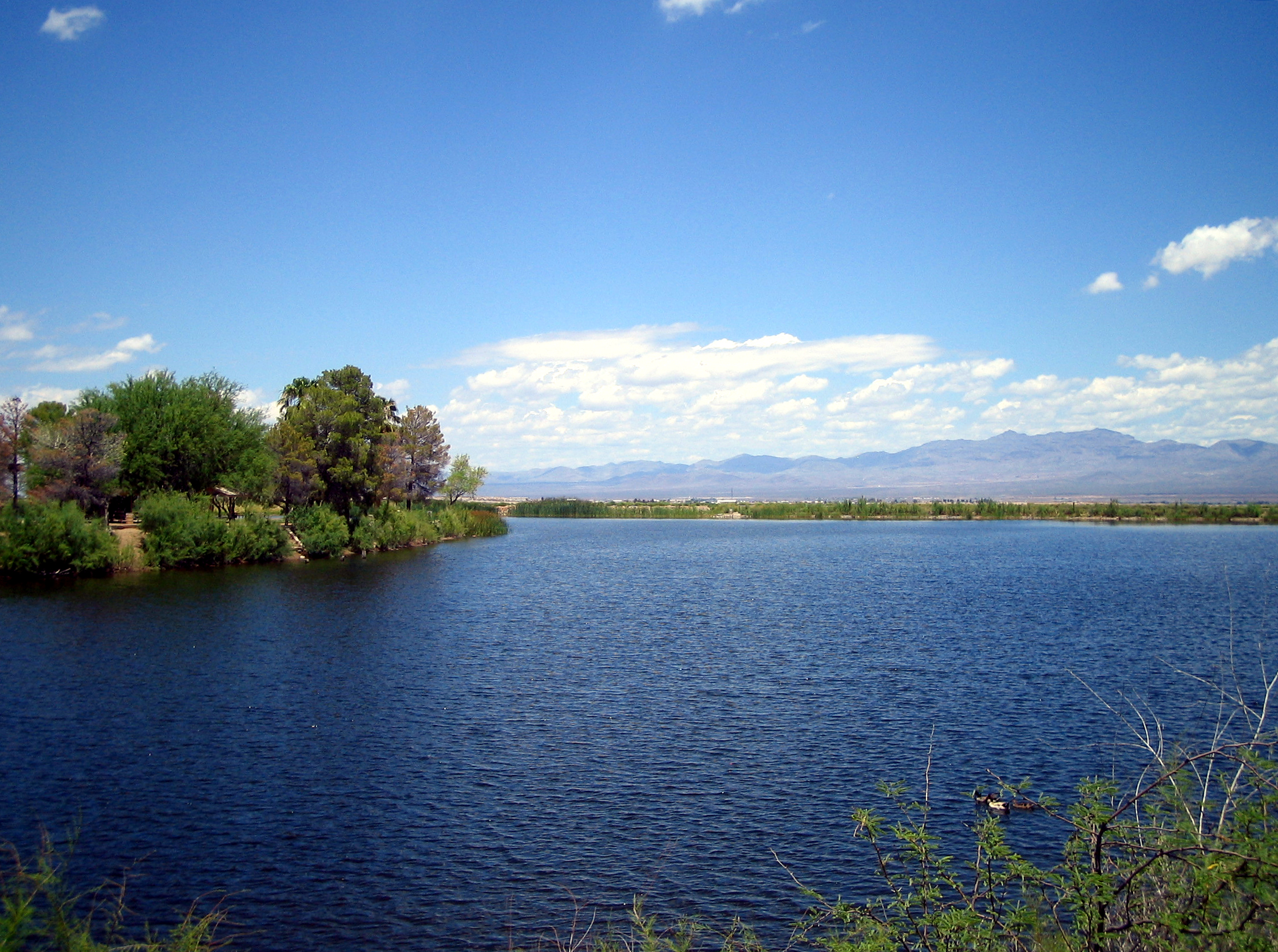
- Roper Lake with Gila Mountains to the northeast

- Location within Arizona
- Location: Madrean Sky Islands, Pinaleño Mountains, Arizona, United States
- Coordinates: 32°45′31″N 109°42′27″W
- Area: 338 acres (137 ha)
- Elevation: 3,130 ft (950 m)
- Established: 1972
- Administrator: Arizona State Parks & Trails
- Visitors: 47,786 (in 2024)
- Website: Official website
Roper Lake
- Location within Arizona
- Location: Graham County, Arizona, United States
- Coordinates: 32°45′21″N 109°42′09″W
- Type: Reservoir
- Primary inflows: Hot spring
- Basin countries: United States
- Surface area: 32 acres (13 ha)
- Average depth: 20 ft (6.1 m)
- Surface elevation: 3,133 ft (955 m)

Roper Lake State Park is a public recreation area of Arizona, United States, surrounding 32-acre (13 ha) Roper Lake. It is surrounded by the sky island Pinaleño Mountains range, which include Mount Graham. The state park is located off U.S. Route 191, five miles (8.0 km) south of Safford, at the Gila River and Valley.

== History ==
Originally developed as a private recreation area in the 1960s, Roper Lake became state-owned when the Arizona Game and Fish Commission acquired it in 1969. The land for the park, formerly a ranch, was purchased by the state in 1972 in order to construct a reservoir. The park opened to the public in 1975.

== Features ==
The park includes a boat ramp, beach for swimming, picnic area, campground, and, cabins. The lake is stocked with bass and trout, and boats are limited to small electric motors. Hiking trails are available, and the park is a place for birdwatching.

Dankworth Pond State Park, located three miles (4.8 km) south, includes a 15-acre (6.1 ha) fishing pond, picnic area, and kayaking.

== Fish species ==
- Rainbow Trout
- Largemouth Bass
- Sunfish
- Channel Catfish
