= Lake Havasu State Park =

State park in Mohave County, Arizona

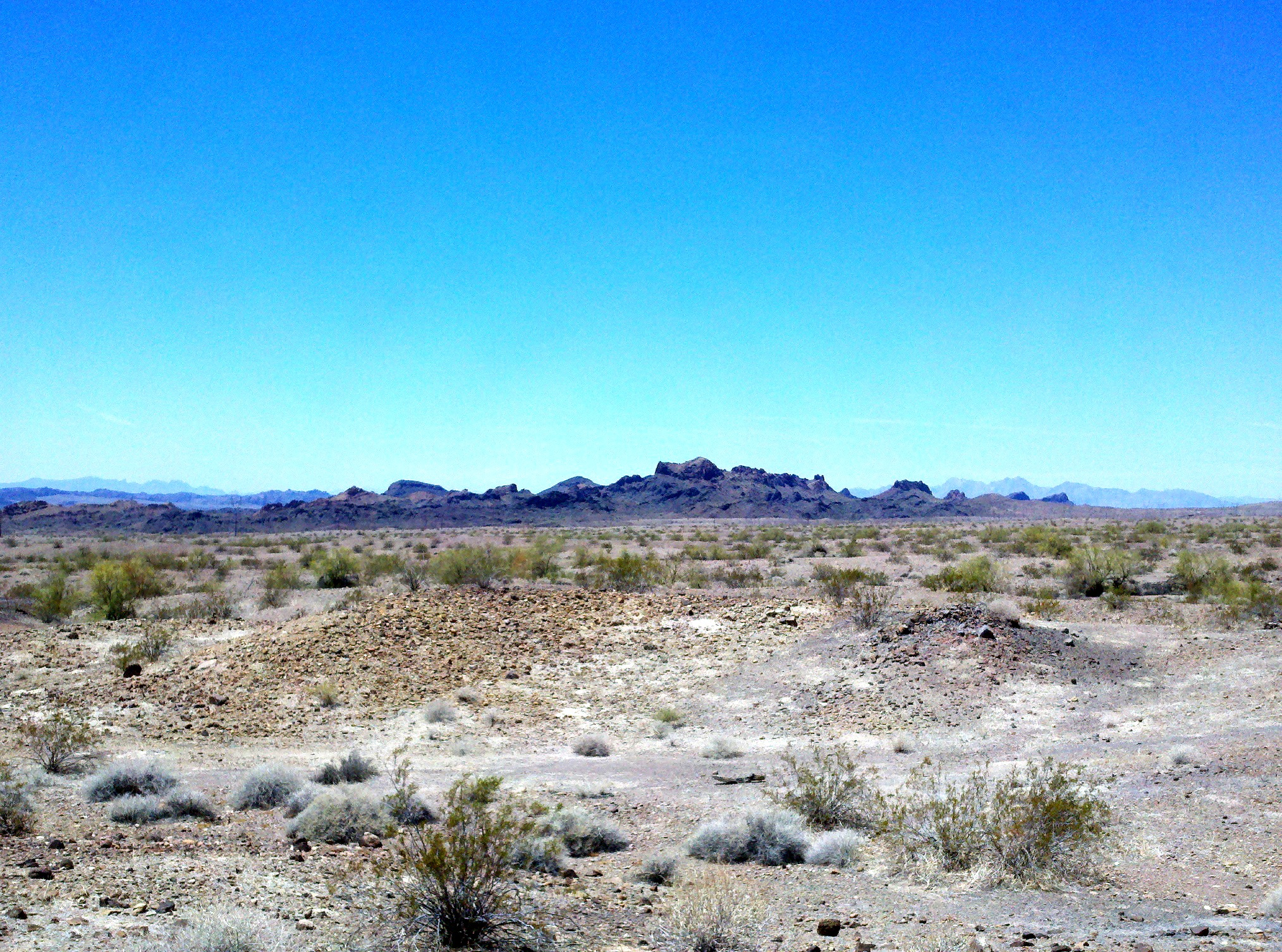
- Mountains at Lake Havasu State Park

- Location within Arizona
- Location: Mohave County, Arizona, United States
- Coordinates: 34°29′36″N 114°21′32″W
- Area: 928 acres (376 ha)
- Elevation: 480 ft (150 m)
- Established: 1965
- Administrator: Arizona State Parks & Trails
- Visitors: 331,442 (in 2024)
- Website: Official website

Lake Havasu State Park is a public recreation area located on Lake Havasu in Mohave County, Arizona, United States. The state park provides outdoor recreation opportunities such as camping, boating, and fishing. The Arroyo-Camino Interpretive Garden displays local desert flora. Windsor Beach includes picnic tables and grills.
