= ARA Patagonia =

Patagonia has been used as the name for a ship in the Argentine Navy three times:

- ARA Patagonia (1885), a protected cruiser
- ARA Patagonia (1926), a transport ship
- ARA Patagonia (B-1), a replenishment oiler
