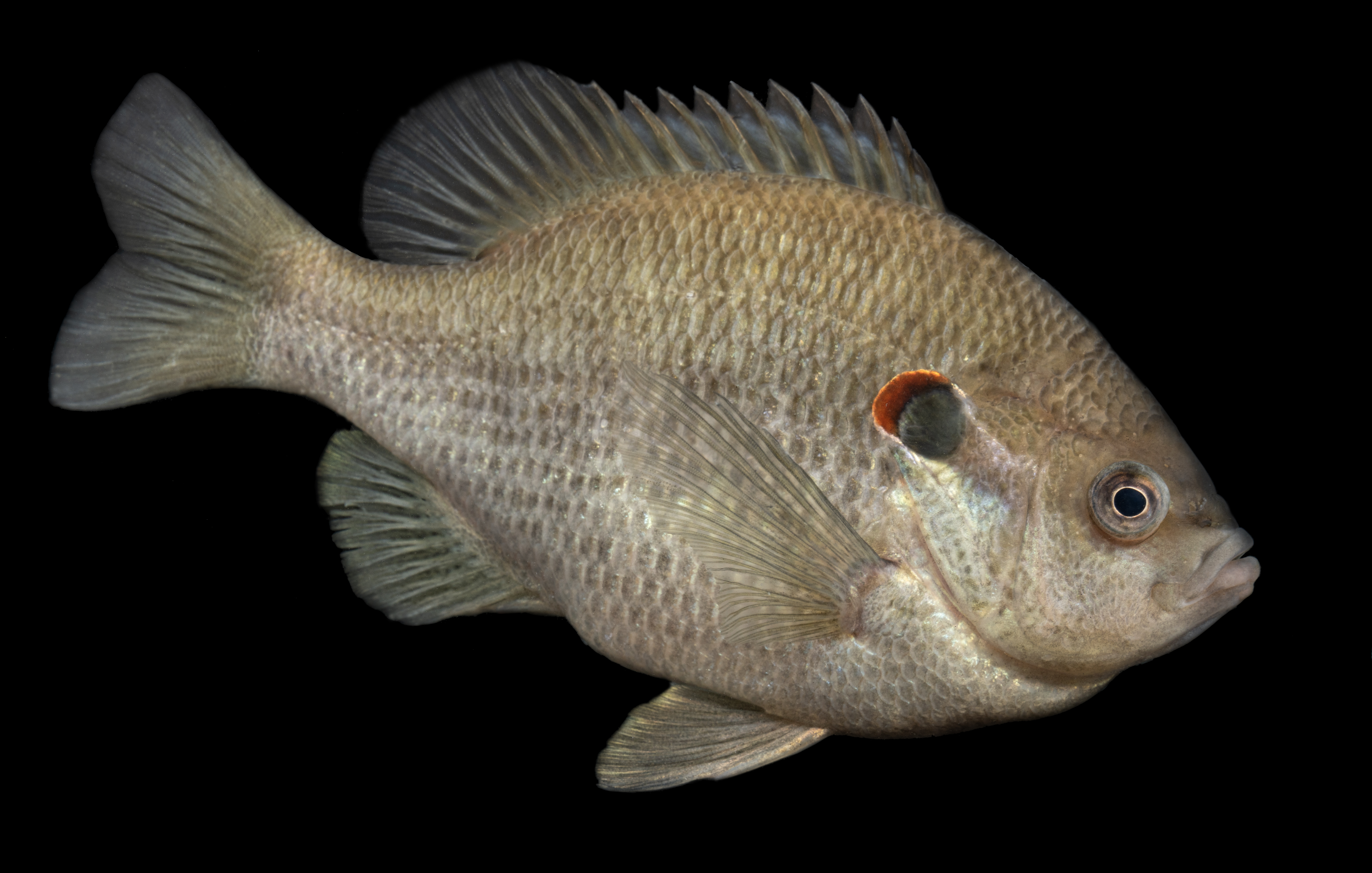

Conservation status
- Least Concern (IUCN 3.1)

Scientific classification
- Kingdom: Animalia
- Phylum: Chordata
- Class: Actinopterygii
- Order: Centrarchiformes
- Family: Centrarchidae
- Genus: Lepomis
- Species: L. microlophus

Binomial name
- Lepomis microlophus (Günther, 1859)

Synonyms
- Pomotis microlophus Günther, 1859

= Redear sunfish =

Redear sunfish Temporal range: Middle Miocene to Recent

Species of fish

The redear sunfish (Lepomis microlophus), also known as the shellcracker, Georgia bream, cherry gill, chinquapin, stumpknocker, and sun perch, is a freshwater fish in the family Centrarchidae and is native to the southeastern United States. Due to its popularity as a sport fish, it has been widely introduced across North America.

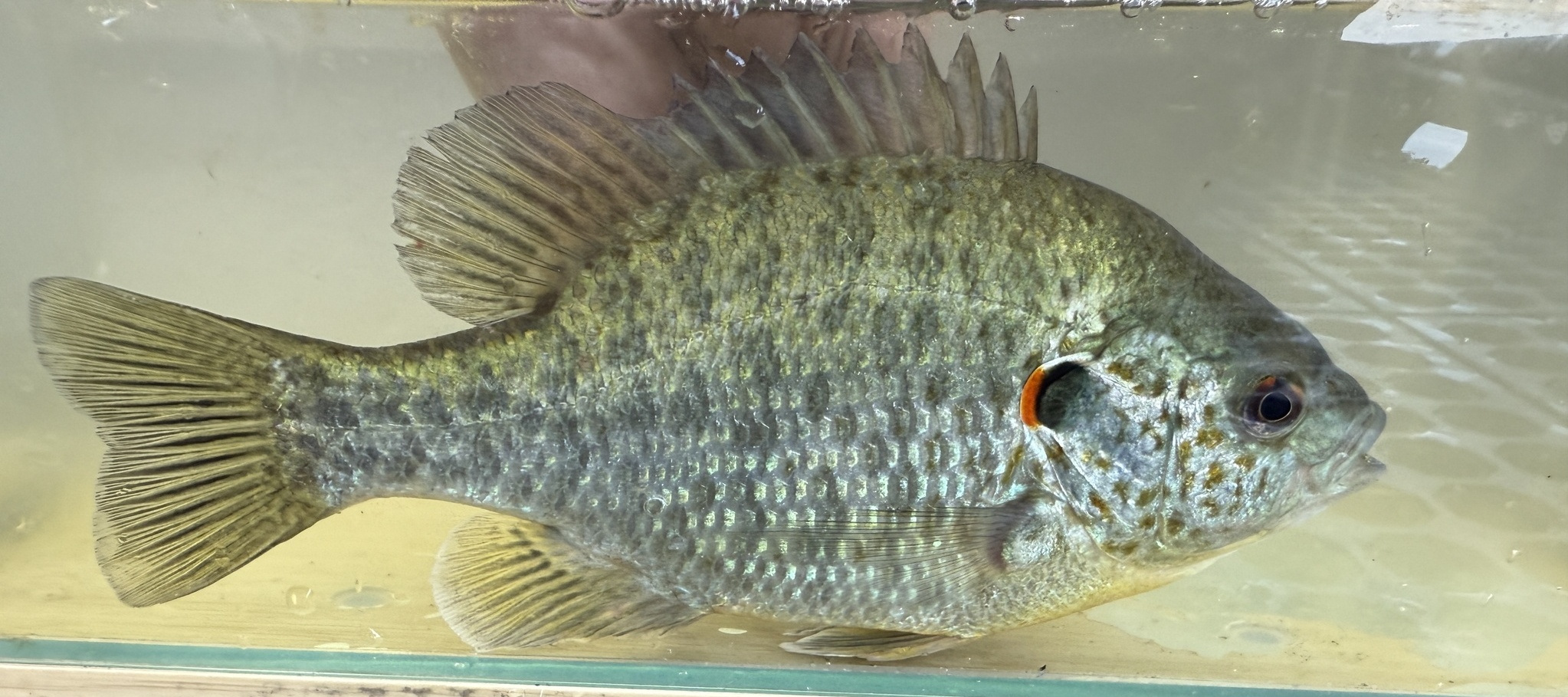
In Ohio

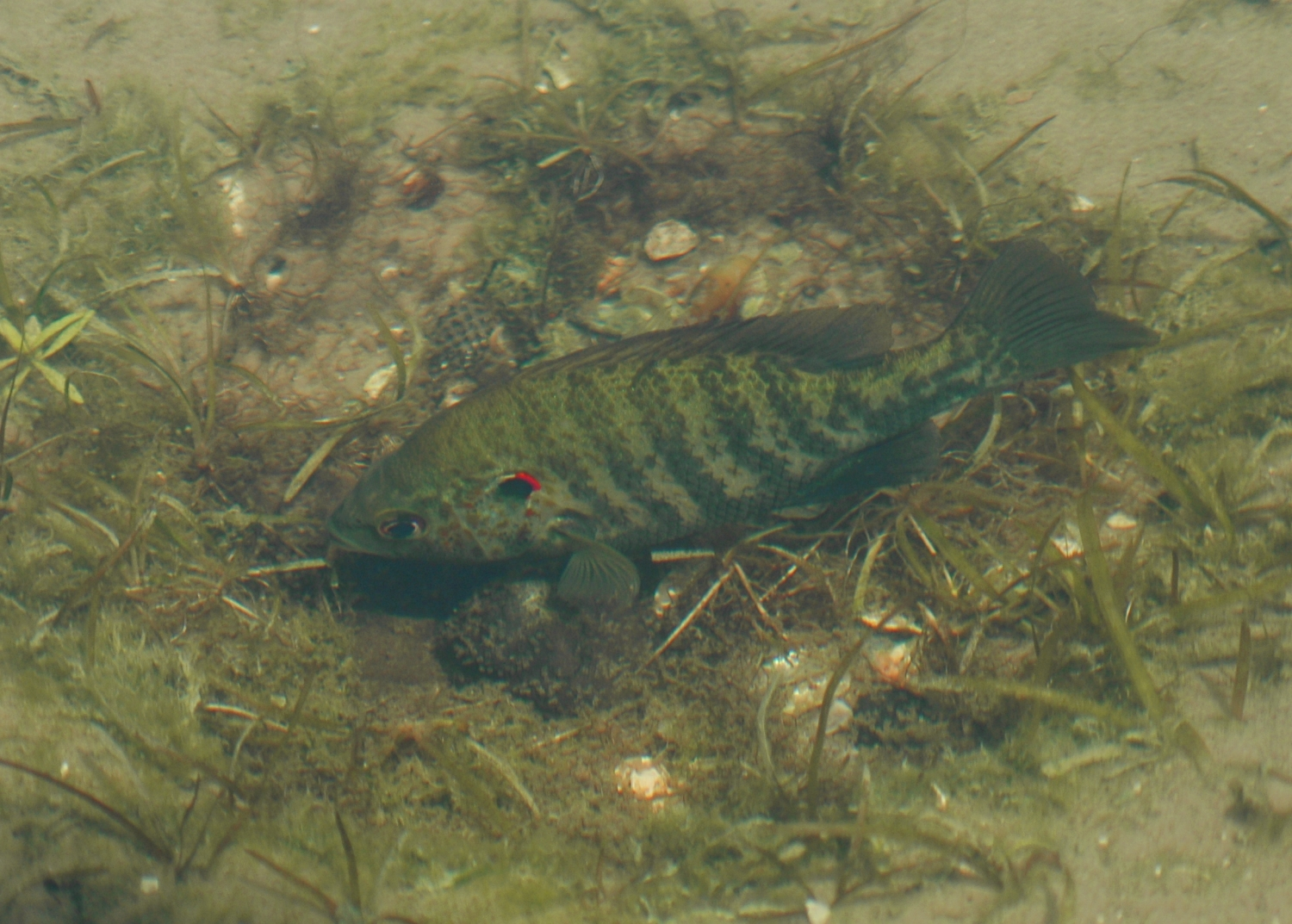
Male redear sunfish guarding eggs

== Description ==
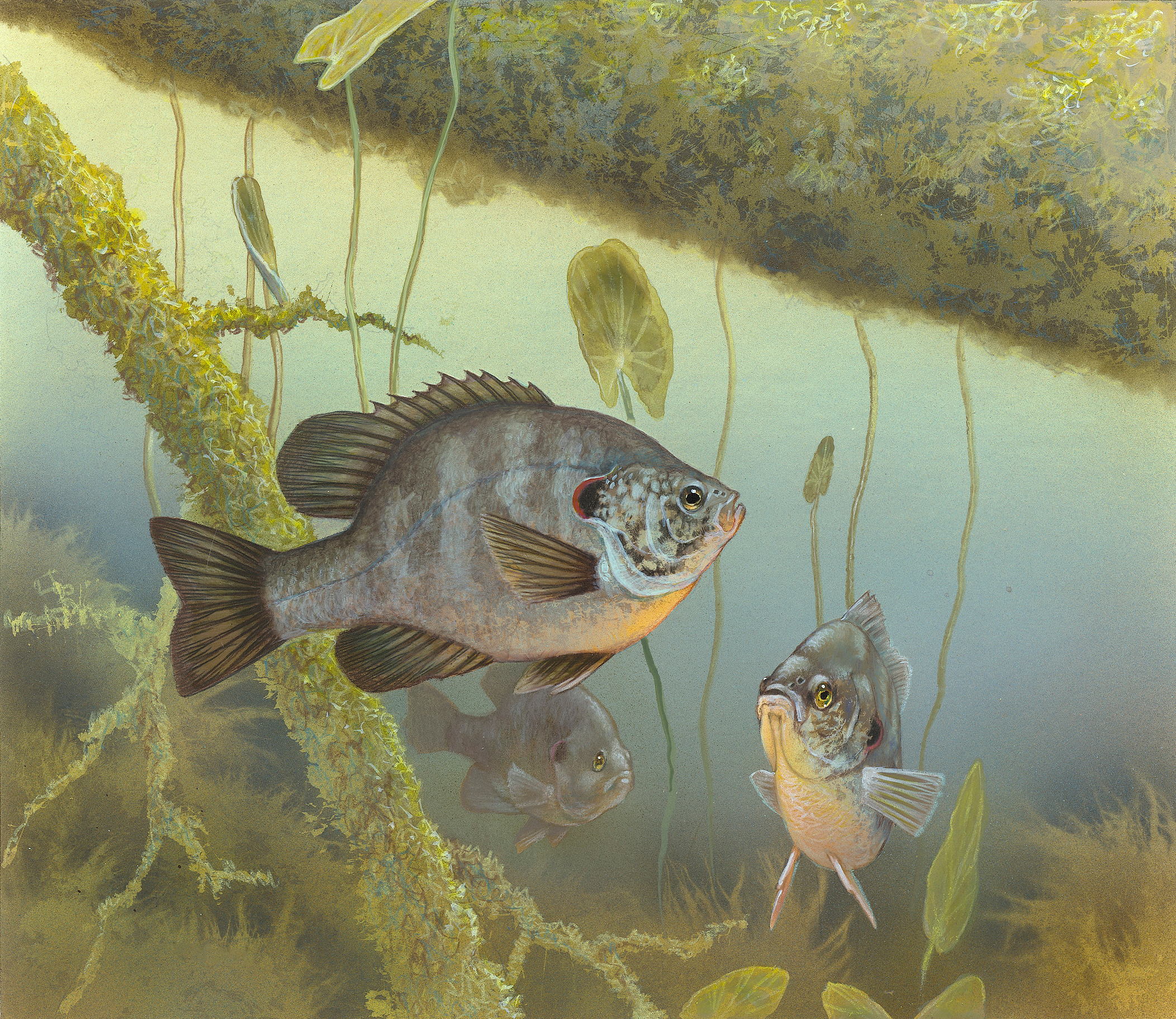
Illustration of the redear sunfish, Lepomis microlophus

Redear sunfish generally resemble bluegill except for coloration and somewhat larger maximum size. The redear sunfish also has faint vertical bars traveling downwards from its dorsal. It is dark-colored dorsally and yellow-green ventrally. Unlike bluegill, the male has a cherry-red edge on its operculum; females have orange coloration in this area. The adult fish are between 20 and 24 cm (7.9 and 9.4 in) in length. Max length is 43.2 cm (17.0 in), compared to a maximum of about 40 cm (16 in) for the bluegill. Redear sunfish on average reach about 0.45 kg (0.99 lb), also larger than the average bluegill.

== Habitat and range ==
Redear sunfish are native to the southeastern United States. They range from North Carolina to Florida, west to southern Illinois and Missouri, and south to the Rio Grande drainage in Texas. However, this fish has been widely introduced to other locations such as the states of Ohio and Arizona.

In the wild, redear sunfish inhabit warm, quiet waters of lakes, ponds, streams, and reservoirs. They prefer to be near logs and vegetation, and tend to congregate in groups around these features. This sunfish is also located in many freshwater marsh wetlands.

== Diet ==
The favorite food of this sunfish is snails, which it obtains by cracking their shells, hence this feisty gamefish's common name: shellcracker. These fish meander along lakebeds, seeking and cracking open snails and other shelled creatures. VanderKooy et al. (2000) observed that large L. microlophus predominantly focus on hard-shelled prey such as ostracods, hydrobiid snails and mussels throughout the entire year. In the same field investigation, it was observed that smaller fish tended to also consume zooplankton, amphipods, chironomid and ceratopongonid larvae and cladocerans, with varied distributions depending on the season. They are also believed to feed on algae, aquatic worms, copepoda, midge larvae, ephemeropteran and odonata nymphs, crayfish, small fish, and fish eggs. Redear sunfish have thick pharyngeal teeth which allow them to crunch exoskeletons. They are even capable of opening small clams. The specialization of this species for the deep-water, mollusk-feeding niche allows it to be introduced to lakes without the risk of competition with fish that prefer shallower water or surface-feeding. In recent years, the stocking of redear has found new allies due to the fish's ability to eat quagga mussels, a prominent invasive species in many freshwater drainages.

== Reproduction ==
During spawning, males congregate and create nests close together in colonies, and females visit to lay eggs. The redear sunfish may occasionally hybridize with other sunfish species.

== Fossil record ==
The redear sunfish is the first-known species of Centrarchidae based on fossil records, as old as 16.3 million years, dating back to the Middle Miocene.

== Relationship with humans ==
Redear sunfish is a popular panfish among recreational anglers. The IGFA all-tackle world record for the species stands at 2.83 kg (6 lb 4 oz) caught in 2021 from Lake Havasu in Arizona.
