= Arizona State Parks & Trails =

Agency overview
- Formed: 1957
- Jurisdiction: State of Arizona
- Headquarters: Phoenix, Arizona
- Agency executive: Bob Broscheid, Director
- Parent department: Arizona Department of Administration
- Website: azstateparks.com

Arizona State Parks & Trails is the state agency responsible for managing Arizona state parks and historic sites. The agency oversees 33 parks encompassing more than 64,000 acres and receives more than 3 million visitors annually.

== History ==
The agency was established in 1957. Its creation reflected the statewide expansion of outdoor recreation and tourism during the decades following World War II. Scholarly work describes how Arizona’s relatively late creation of a state park system influenced its early reliance on interagency partnerships and shared management arrangements.

In 2017, the National Recreation and Park Association awarded Arizona State Parks & Trails its Gold Medal Award for the best-managed state park system in the United States.

The agency was known as Arizona State Parks from its founding until March 2017.

== Holdings ==
The agency manages 33 state parks encompassing more than 64,000 acres statewide and receives more than 3 million visitors annually. Volunteers contributed more than 178,000 service hours statewide in fiscal year 2024.

The system includes:

- 23 recreation parks — 15 with camping and 8 day-use only
- 8 historic parks
- 1 memorial state park
- 1 state natural area

Regional media have profiled the system’s wide range of landscapes and recreation opportunities.

Representative landscapes within the state park system

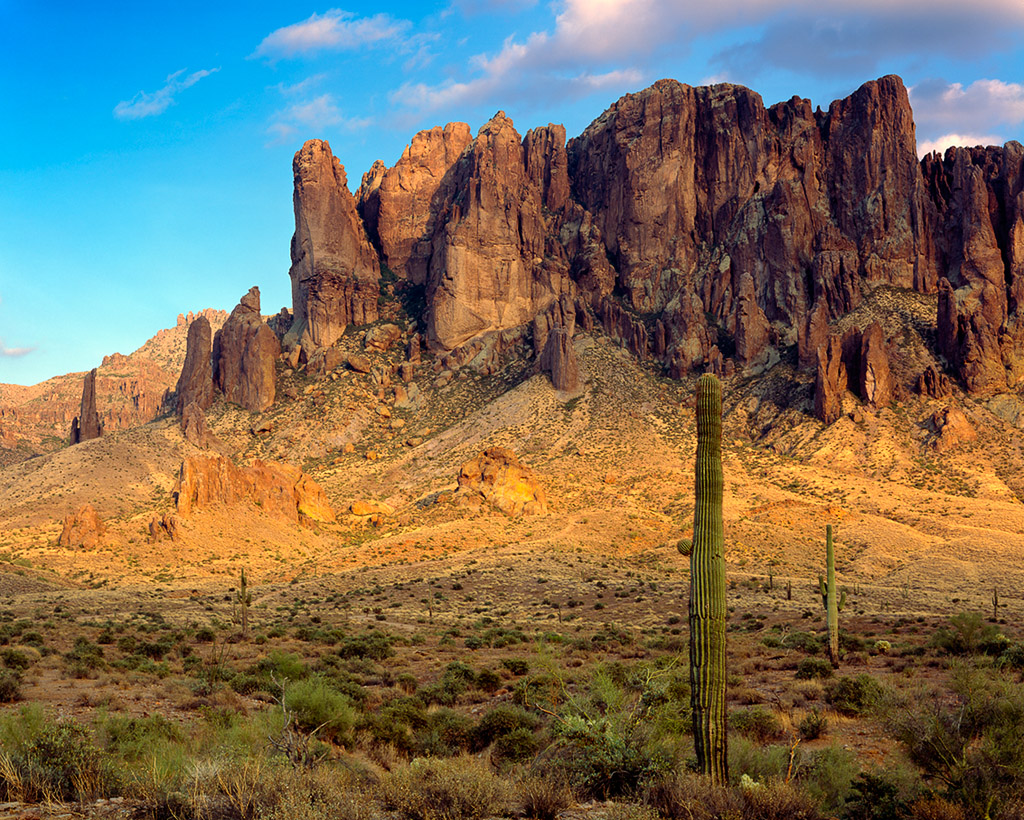
Lost Dutchman

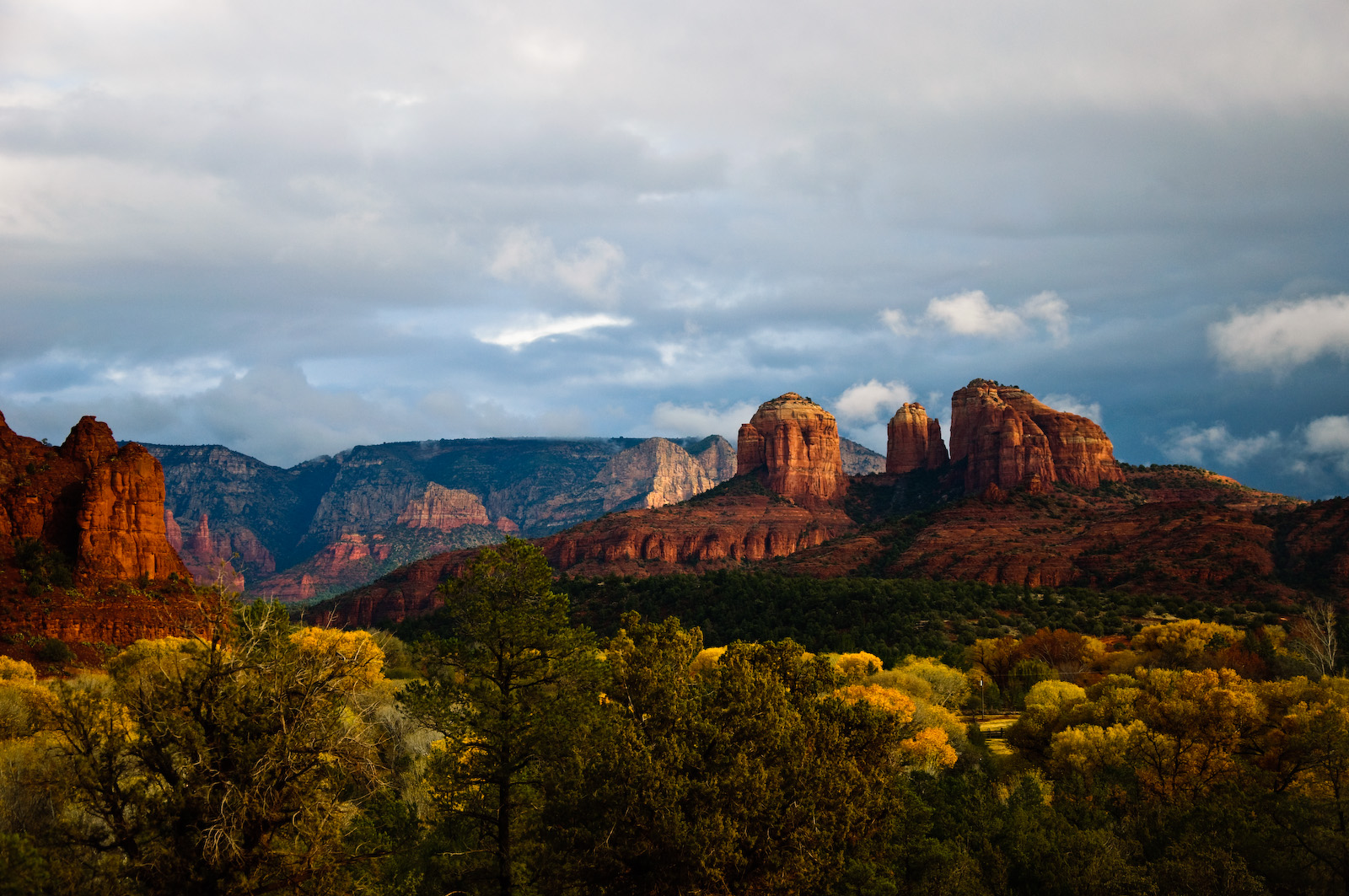
Red Rock

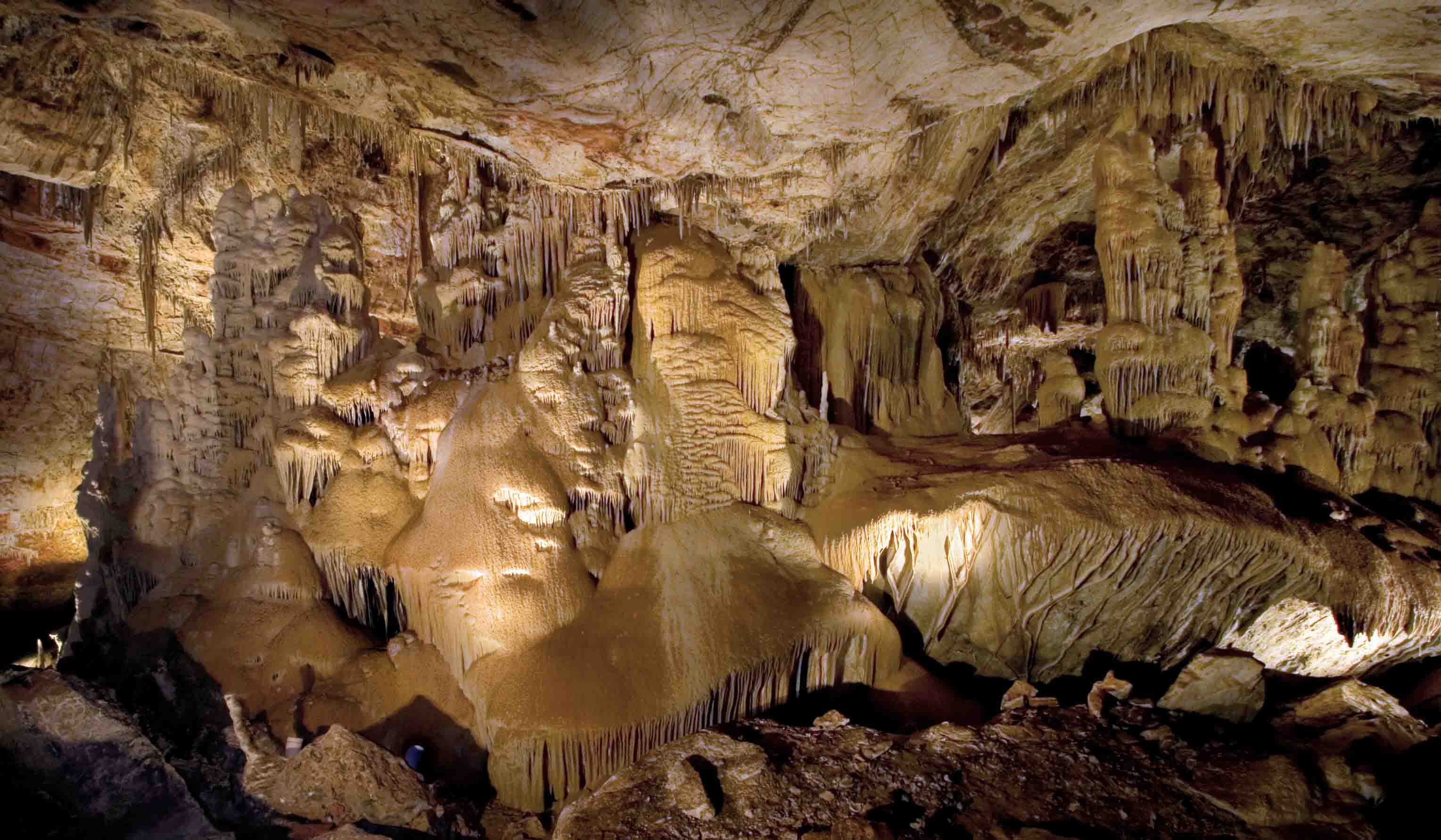
Kartchner Caverns

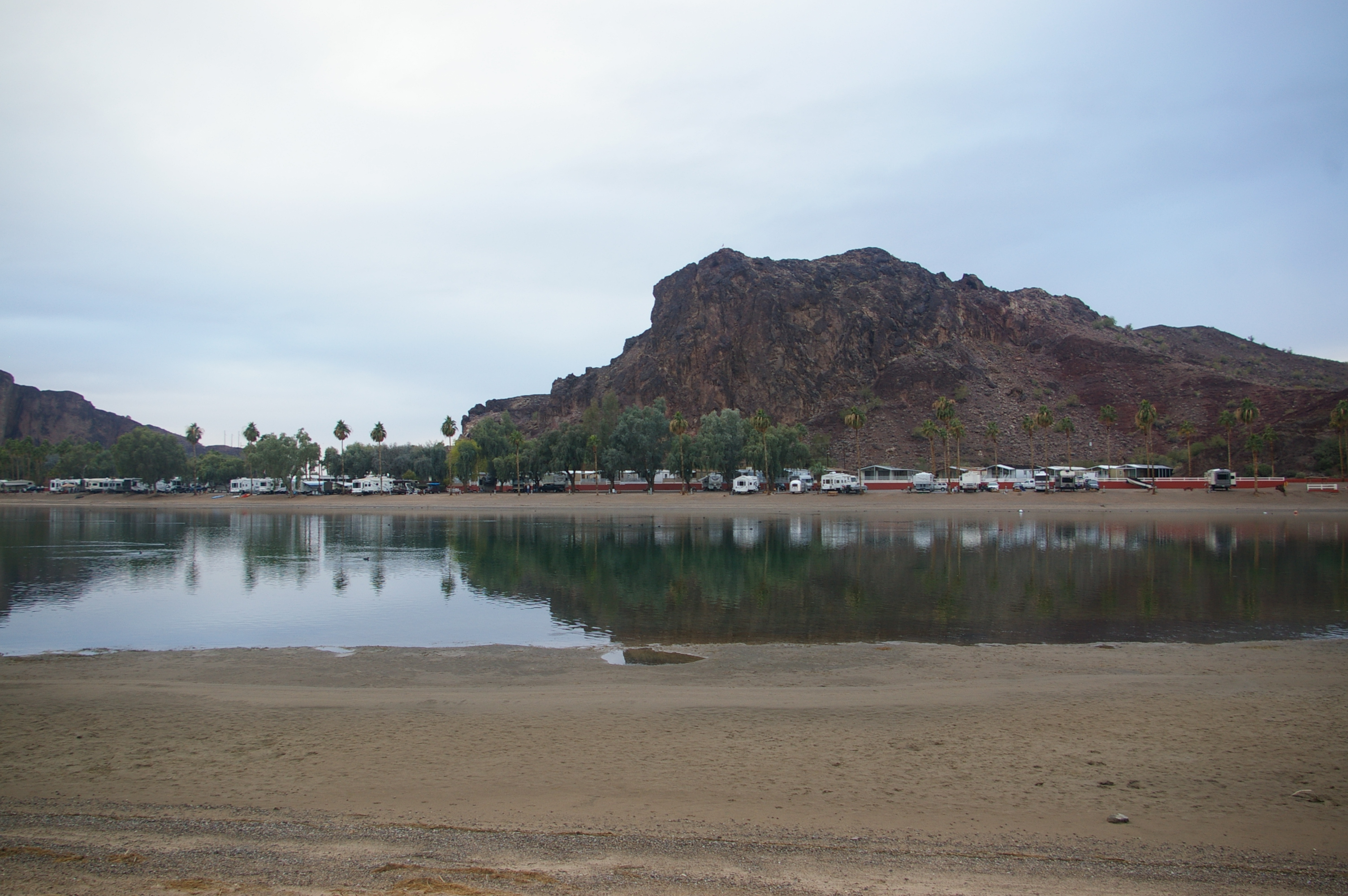
Buckskin Mountain
