= Tucson Arizona Temple =

LDS Church temple

Coordinates: 32°20′18″N 110°56′56″W

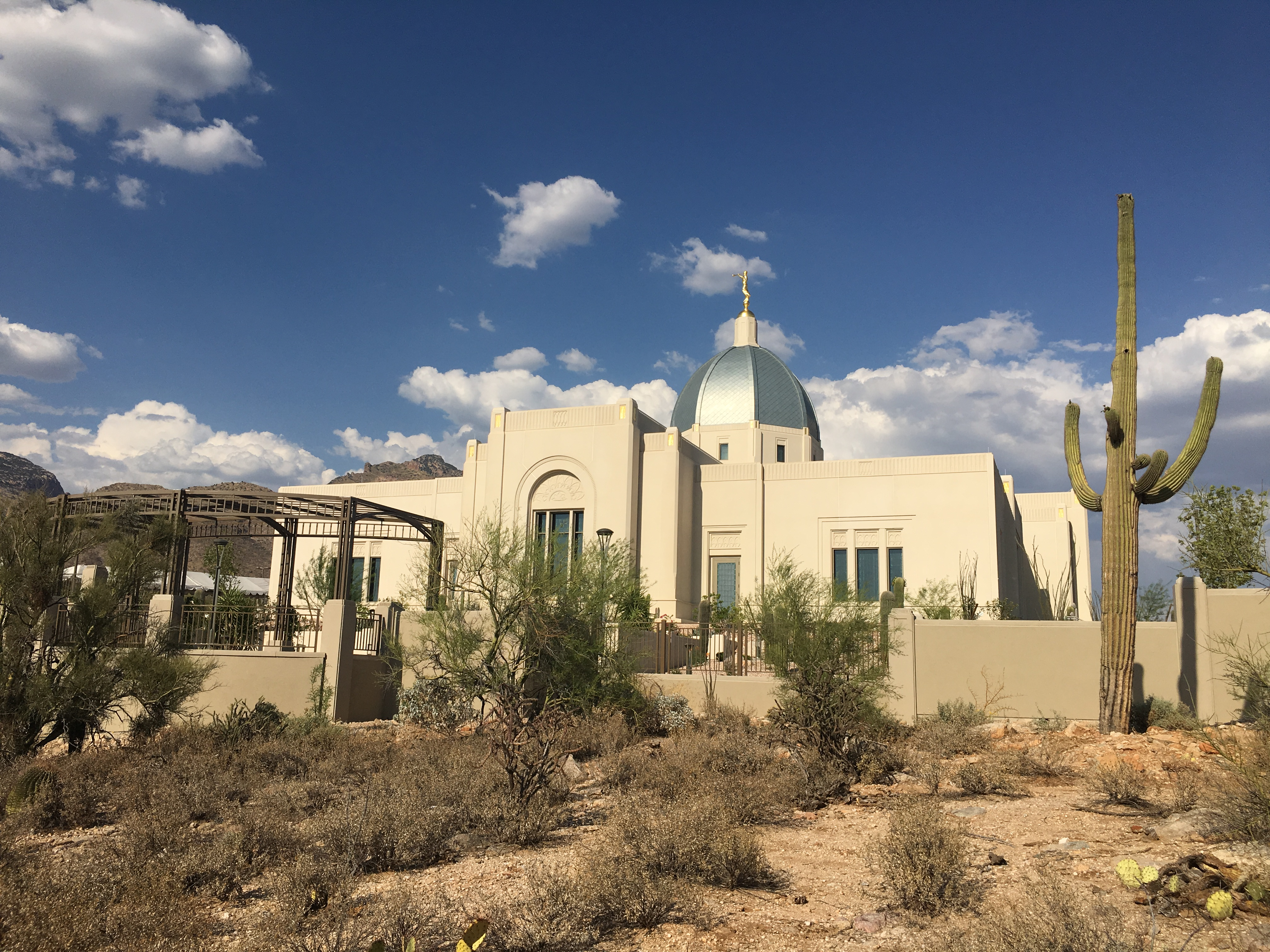
- West facade in June 2017
- Interactive map of Tucson Arizona Temple
- Number: 157
- Dedication: August 13, 2017, by Dieter F. Uchtdorf
- Site: 7 acres (2.8 ha)
- Floor area: 38,216 ft^{2} (3,550.4 m^{2})
- Official website • News & images

Church chronology
← Paris France Temple	Tucson Arizona Temple	→ Meridian Idaho Temple

Additional information
- Announced: October 6, 2012, by Thomas S. Monson
- Groundbreaking: October 17, 2015, by Dieter F. Uchtdorf
- Open house: June 3 – 24, 2017
- Current president: Karl B Kern
- Location: Catalina Foothills, Arizona, U.S.
- Exterior finish: Precast integral colored concrete panels
- Baptistries: 1
- Ordinance rooms: 2
- Sealing rooms: 2

The Tucson Arizona Temple is a temple of the Church of Jesus Christ of Latter-day Saints in Catalina Foothills, Arizona, just north of Tucson. The intent to construct the temple was announced by church president Thomas S. Monson on October 6, 2012, during general conference. The temple is the sixth in Arizona, following those in Mesa, Snowflake, Gila Valley, Gilbert, and Phoenix.

The temple is 38,216 square feet (3,550.4 m^{2}), located on a 7.4-acre (3.0 ha) site, with a dome topped with a statue of the angel Moroni. This temple was designed by FFKR Architects, using an Art Deco style. A groundbreaking ceremony, to signify the beginning of construction, was held on October 17, 2015, conducted by Dieter F. Uchtdorf, who was then in the First Presidency.

== History ==
The temple was announced by Thomas S. Monson on October 6, 2012. On August 7, 2015, the church announced that the temple would be constructed on a property located on N Skyline Drive. Dieter F. Uchtdorf presided at a groundbreaking to signify beginning of construction on October 17, 2015.

After construction was complete, a public open house was held from June 3 to 24, 2017, excluding Sundays. The temple was dedicated on August 13, 2017, by Uchtdorf.

In 2020, like all others in the church, the Tucson Arizona Temple was closed for a time due to the COVID-19 pandemic.

== Design and architecture ==
The Tucson Arizona Temple was designed in the Art Deco style, with Sonoran Desert motifs. Designed by FFKR Architects, its architecture reflects the cultural heritage of the Tucson region and its spiritual significance to the church.

The temple sits on a 7.4-acre plot located in the foothills of the Santa Catalina Mountains, which are the most prominent mountain range in Tucson. A third of the site was left to its natural state, while lawns and flowering annuals cover the remainder.

The temple is 38,216 square feet, constructed with precast integral colored concrete panels, featuring a dome inspired by the 1920s-era Pima County Courthouse, and is notably smaller in height than many other temples due to local zoning ordinances. The exterior is also decorated with “recessed panels featuring a stylized pattern of the ocotillo cactus,” and art glass depicting native flora.

The interior features a Southwestern-inspired Art Deco theme, centered around a color palette of red and orange to reflect the colors of the desert. The interior decorations, including the art glass, utilize “stylized patterns of the native ocotillo, prickly pear cactus, red cactus flowers and orange hues representing the desert sun.”

The temple includes two instruction rooms, two sealing rooms, and a baptistry, each designed for ceremonial use.

The design uses symbolic elements representing the heritage of Tucson and the natural landscapes surrounding the temple, which provides spiritual meaning to its appearance and function. Symbolism is important to church members and includes the temple’s red and orange color palette and depictions of native plants, both of which are intended to represent the natural landscapes of Tucson.

== Temple presidents ==
The church's temples are directed by a temple president and matron, each serving for a term of three years. The president and matron oversee the administration of temple operations and provide guidance and training for both temple patrons and staff. The first president and matron, serving from 2017 to 2020, were James M. Moeller and Marina E. Moeller. As of 2024, the temple’s president and matron are Karl B. Kern and Martha Cummings Kern.

== Admittance ==
Following the completion of the temple, a public open house was held from June 3-24, 2017 (excluding Sundays). The temple was dedicated by Dieter F. Uchtdorf on August 13, 2017, in three sessions.

Like all the church's temples, it is not used for Sunday worship services. To members of the church, temples are regarded as sacred houses of the Lord. Once dedicated, only church members with a current temple recommend can enter for worship.

== See also ==
Temples in Arizona ()
- = Operating
- = Under construction
- = Announced
- = Temporarily Closed

- Comparison of temples of The Church of Jesus Christ of Latter-day Saints
- List of temples of The Church of Jesus Christ of Latter-day Saints
- List of temples of The Church of Jesus Christ of Latter-day Saints by geographic region
- Temple architecture (Latter-day Saints)
- The Church of Jesus Christ of Latter-day Saints in Arizona
