= Wilford, Arizona =

- Ghost town
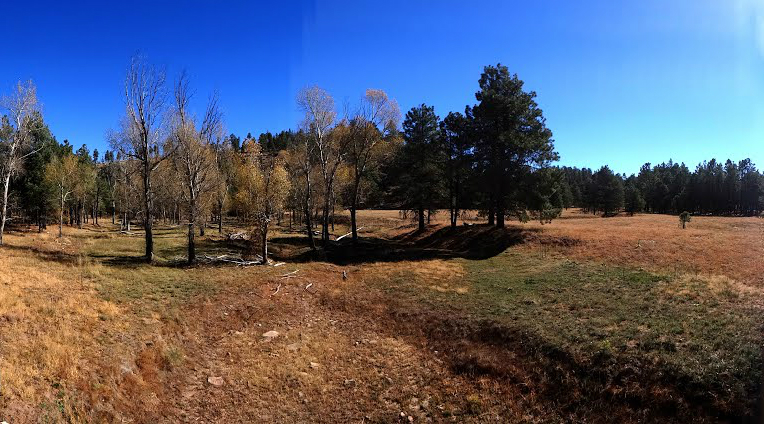

- Location within Arizona Location within the United States
- Coordinates: 34°21′54″N 110°38′44″W
- Country: United States
- State: Arizona
- County: Navajo
- Founded: 1883
- Abandoned: 1926
- Founder: Jerome Jefferson Adams
- Named for: Wilford Woodruff
- Elevation: 6,709 ft (2,045 m)
- Time zone: UTC-7 (MST (no DST))

Wilford is a ghost town in Navajo County, Arizona, United States, located approximately 7 miles south of Heber-Overgaard, along Black Canyon Rd. The town was settled in April 1883 by a group of Latter-day Saints from the failed Brigham City settlement. Wilford was eventually abandoned due to years of overgrazing by cattle. The last residents moved out in 1926.

== History ==
During the 1880s, discouraged Little Colorado River settlers began migrating to the forests of the Mogollon Rim. Wilford was settled in April 1883 by LDS members from Brigham City. Originally called "Adam's Valley", after founder (Jerome Jefferson Adams), the name was changed to "Wilford", President Wilford Woodruff, fourth president of the Church of Jesus Christ of Latter-day Saints (LDS Church), at a quarterly stake conference in August 1883.

Joining the Adams family, from Brigham City, were the Edmund Richardsons, Charles Whitings, Andrew Petersons, and Sullivan Richardsons. These families were later joined by the Brookbanks and Nathanael Porter families. Sunset residents had formed a settlement 3/4 miles south at "The Forks", and former St. Joseph residents lived north in Heber (Heber-Overgaard, Arizona). Over 30 families inhabited these settlements by 1883. At this time, Wilford consisted primarily of single room log cabins. Dry farming and cattle ranching were the primary way of life. Milk, from the cattle, had a number of uses, and abundant crops consisting of corn, potatoes, wheat, squash, melons and popcorn could be traded for goods and services. Childbirth was dangerous to both mother and child at this time. The closest doctor was a 2-day ride.

In February 1885, the Edmunds Act led the LDS Church to counsel polygamists to move south to Mexico and build a city of refuge on the Casas Grandes River in Chihuahua. Nearly half of Wilford's population was lost to the migration. The following year, non-Latter-day Saint families and Hashknife Cowboys began moving into the area, forever changing the atmosphere. The Hashknife cowboys drove herds of cattle for the Aztec Land and Cattle Company. Many residents felt intimidated by the cowboys, but some firmly stood their ground. It was not unheard of, for residents returning home after a leave of absence, to find that Hashknife Cowboys had moved into their vacant cabin. This eventually became such a problem, that law enforcement began getting involved. John Hoyle, a former cook for the Hashknife Outfit, ran a store and ranch in "Hoyle's Canyon" for 3 years before relocating to Heber in 1891.

By 1888, due to years of overgrazing by the cattle of the Aztec Land & Cattle Company, most of the grassy meadows had become eroded washes. Numerous families abandoned the settlement at this time. Some residents relocated to nearby Heber, while others joined their friends in Mexico. Wilford ceased being a town by 1889; then consisting of sparsely populated ranches. The last residents moved out in 1926. Today, loose rock foundations are the only physical evidence of the former settlement.

== See also ==
- Brigham City, Arizona
- Heber, Arizona
- The Church of Jesus Christ of Latter-day Saints in Arizona
