= Phoenix Arizona Temple =

Church of Jesus Christ of Latter-day Saints temple

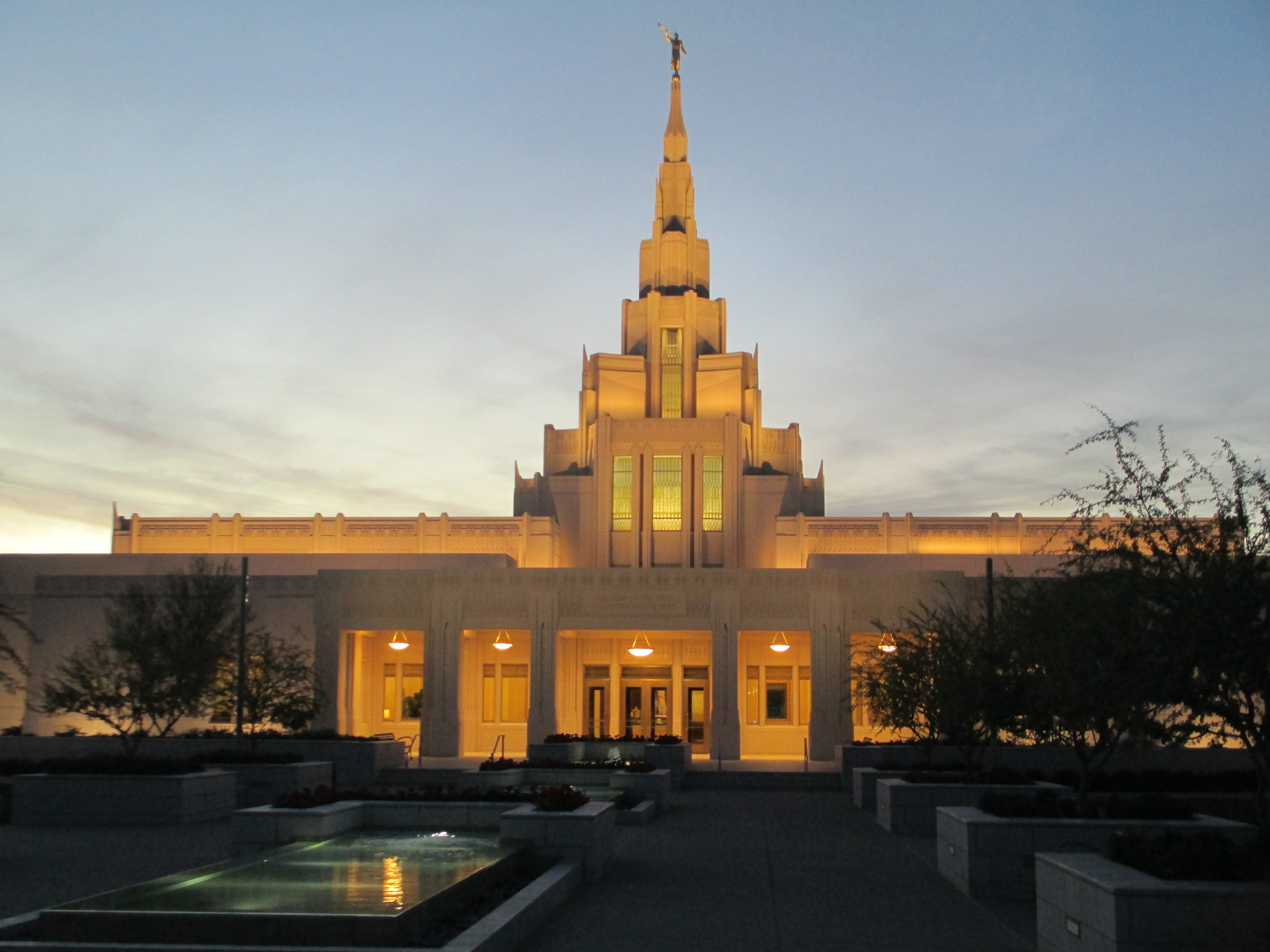
- Temple at sunset
- Interactive map of Phoenix Arizona Temple
- Number: 144
- Dedication: November 16, 2014, by Thomas S. Monson
- Site: 5.19 acres (2.10 ha)
- Floor area: 64,870 ft^{2} (6,027 m^{2})
- Height: 90 ft (27 m)
- Official website • News & images

Church chronology
← Fort Lauderdale Florida Temple	Phoenix Arizona Temple	→ Córdoba Argentina Temple

Additional information
- Announced: May 24, 2008, by Thomas S. Monson
- Groundbreaking: June 4, 2011, by Ronald A. Rasband
- Open house: October 10 – November 1, 2014
- Current president: Paul David Sorensen
- Location: Phoenix, Arizona, U.S.
- Coordinates: 33°41′54.3″N 112°10′20.3″W
- Exterior finish: Precast integral colored concrete panels
- Baptistries: 1
- Ordinance rooms: 2 (two-stage progressive)
- Sealing rooms: 4
- Notes: A public open house was held from October 10 to November 1, 2014.

The Phoenix Arizona Temple is a temple of the Church of Jesus Christ of Latter-day Saints (LDS Church), in Phoenix, Arizona. It was completed in 2014 and is the LDS Church's 144th temple. The announcement on May 24, 2008 of the planned construction of the temple came a month after the Gila Valley and Gilbert temples were announced for Arizona. The temple is the state’s fifth.

The temple has a single attached central spire with a statue of the angel Moroni. This temple was designed by the architectural firm CCBG Architects. A groundbreaking ceremony, to signify the beginning of construction, was held on June 4, 2011, conducted by Ronald A. Rasband.

== History ==
The announcement of plans to build a temple in Phoenix came partly as a response to the high concentration of church members in the area and to help ease the load on the nearby Mesa Arizona Temple.

The original design of the temple, which resembled the Draper Utah Temple, exceeded the maximum height restrictions imposed by existing zoning law and required an exception be granted by the Phoenix city council. The primary issue was not the planned steeple height of 126 feet (38 m), as church steeples are exempt from zoning laws, but the temple's structural height of 40 feet (12 m). The exterior color of the temple was also changed from the traditional white to a more natural stone color in an effort to address the concerns of residents in the neighborhood.

The city council voted to approve the requested zoning exemptions on December 2, 2009. Local residents opposed to the construction mounted a successful campaign to call for a voter referendum on the council's decision, delivering the requisite signatures by December 31, potentially delaying the approval process until September 2011 when the issue could be put to a vote. After a series of talks with the opposition, LDS Church representatives announced on January 26, 2010, that the temple would be redesigned to comply with the zoning restrictions by limiting the structural height to 30 feet (9.1 m), eliminating the need for any exceptions or any further approvals. LDS Church representatives indicated that the redesign process would take from 8 to 12 months. The height of the steeple, building color and lighting are not regulated by zoning laws and it was unclear at that time if the steeple height would be changed with the redesign, or previous design concessions would be retained in the new design.

On August 17, 2010, the redesign was submitted to the city of Phoenix for preliminary approval. A meeting for neighbors of the temple was held that same day. The redesigned structure is 30 feet high with a 90-foot spire. This met the 30-feet zoning limit on building heights, and the total height is 9 feet lower than the previously proposed design.

Ronald A. Rasband, then of the Presidency of the Seventy, presided at a small groundbreaking ceremony held on June 4, 2011. After construction was completed, a public open house was held from October 10 to November 1, 2014. The temple was dedicated on November 16, 2014, by church president Thomas S. Monson, and ended up being the last one he dedicated before his death in early 2018.

In 2020, like all the church's others, the Phoenix Arizona Temple was closed for a time in response to the COVID-19 pandemic.

== Design and architecture ==
The building has desert-inspired architecture, and traditional Latter-day Saint temple design. Designed by CCBG Architects, its architecture reflects both the cultural heritage of Arizona and its spiritual significance to the church.

The temple is on a 5.19-acre plot, with surrounding landscaping including three fountains, as well as desert trees and shrubs. These elements are designed to provide a tranquil setting that enhances the sacred atmosphere of the site.

The structure stands one story tall, constructed with precast integral colored concrete panels. The exterior has carved detailing, especially on the tower that supports the angel Moroni statue.

The interior has “an aloe stalk motif, designs of desert tree leaves, terracotta and turquoise designs, and other earth tones that reflect the desert landscape of the area.” The temple includes two instruction rooms, four sealing rooms, and a baptistry, each designed for ceremonial use.

The design has symbolic elements representing the natural landscapes of Arizona, to provide deeper spiritual meaning to the temple's appearance and function. Symbolism is important to church members and includes the river-inspired fountains, which represent “life-giving water in the arid landscape.”

== Temple presidents ==
The church's temples are directed by a temple president and matron, each serving for a term of three years. The president and matron oversee the administration of temple operations and provide guidance and training for both temple patrons and staff.

Serving from 2014 to 2017, the first president of the Phoenix Arizona Temple was Russell S. Gilliland, with Karen J. Gilliland serving as matron. As of 2024, Paul D. Sorensen is the president, with Julienne K. Sorensen as matron.

== Admittance ==
On August 7, 2014, the church announced the public open house that was held from October 10 to November 1, 2014 (excluding Sundays). The temple was dedicated by Thomas S. Monson on November 16, 2014, in three sessions.

Like all the church's temples, it is not used for Sunday worship services. To members of the church, temples are regarded as sacred houses of the Lord. Once dedicated, only church members with a current temple recommend can enter for worship.

== See also ==
Temples in Arizona ()
- = Operating
- = Under construction
- = Announced
- = Temporarily Closed

- Comparison of temples of The Church of Jesus Christ of Latter-day Saints
- List of temples of The Church of Jesus Christ of Latter-day Saints
- List of temples of The Church of Jesus Christ of Latter-day Saints by geographic region
- Temple architecture (Latter-day Saints)
- The Church of Jesus Christ of Latter-day Saints in Arizona
