= The Church of Jesus Christ of Latter-day Saints in Arizona =

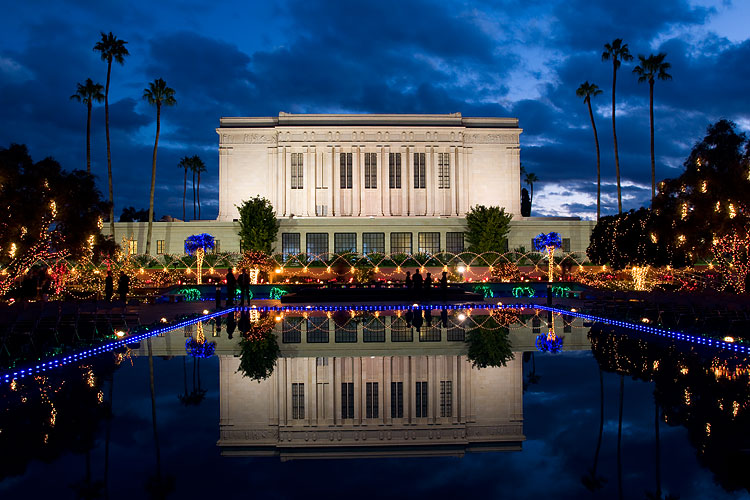
- Christmas Lights at the Mesa Arizona Temple
- Area: US Southwest
- Members: 442,094 (2025)
- Stakes: 120
- Districts: 3
- Wards: 806
- Branches: 86
- Total Congregations: 892
- Missions: 6
- Temples: 6 operating 3 announced 9 total
- FamilySearch Centers: 74

The Church of Jesus Christ of Latter-day Saints is the second-largest religious denomination in Arizona, behind the Roman Catholic Church. In 2025, the church reported 442,094 members in Arizona, about 6% of the state's population. According to the 2014 Pew Forum on Religion & Public Life survey, roughly 5% of Arizonans self-identify most closely with the Church of Jesus Christ of Latter-day Saints.

== History ==
Membership in Arizona
Year	Membership
1920	14,813
1930	18,732
1940	25,272
1950	33,937
1960	60,457
1970	94,249
1980	171,880
*1989	241,000
1999	305,034
2009	374,830
2019	436,521
2025	442,094
*Membership was published as a rounded number. Source: Windall J. Ashton; Jim M. Wall, Deseret News, various years, Church Almanac Country Information: Arizona

=== Mormon Battalion ===
The first presence of Latter-day Saints in Arizona was the Mormon Battalion. They marched through what is now southern Arizona in 1846 on the way to California as part of the Mexican–American War. They encountered wild cattle bulls and killed several of them in defense. They passed through Tucson (then a town of 400–500 inhabitants) causing an attachment of Mexican Forces to flee. They camped at the mouth of the Gila River before entering California.

=== Northern Arizona settlements ===
The next time Latter-day Saints entered the area was in 1858 and 1859, when Jacob Hamblin and his companions camped at Pipe Spring in the northwestern part of present-day Arizona. They did this while journeying to and from their missions among the Moqui (Hopi) Indians east of the Colorado River.

During the 1860s and 1870s, LDS parties explored portions of the area searching for possible settlement sites. Also during this period, isolated ranches and small Mormon settlements were established at Short Creek (now Colorado City), Pipe Spring, Beaver Dam and neighboring Littlefield, and Lee's Ferry, all in the area between the Utah border and the Grand Canyon known as the Arizona Strip.

The first effort at large-scale LDS colonization came in March 1873 when a group of Latter-day Saints was sent from Utah to the Little Colorado River drainage under the direction of Horton D. Height. The colonizers turned back, discouraged by the poor prospects, but a few returned the following year and began farming among the Native Americans at Moencopi. Local hostilities forced the colonists to leave again after a month. A year later, James S. Brown led another small colonizing group that successfully settled at Moencopi, then began exploring the surrounding area. Following these explorations, a large group of settlers, led by Lot Smith, arrived in the spring of 1876 and established four settlements on the Little Colorado, which they called Ballenger's Camp (later renamed Brigham City), Sunset, Obed and Allen City (later renamed St. Joseph, and then Joseph City), along with a support settlement near Mormon Lake with a sawmill, dairy and tannery.

=== Central and southern Arizona settlements ===
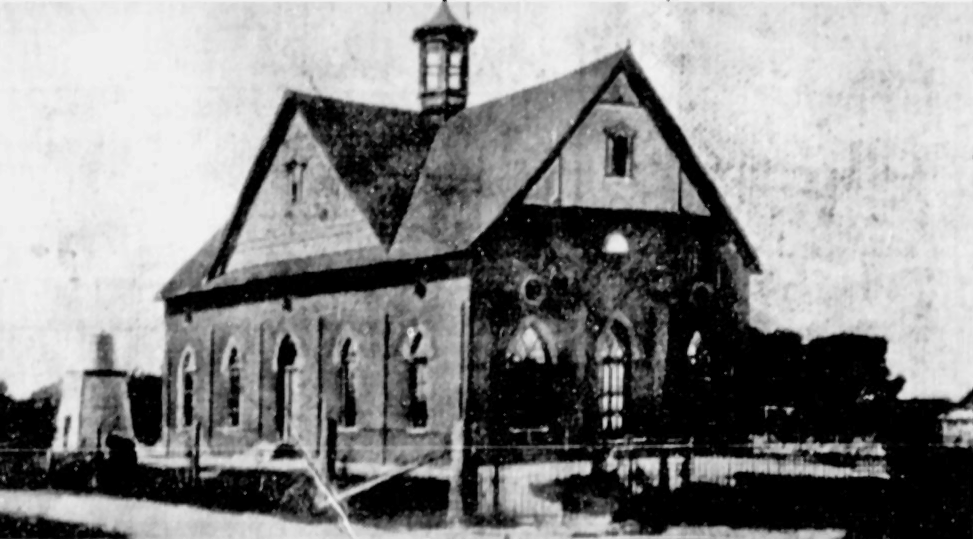
The former Maricopa Stake Tabernacle (1896–1967), in Mesa

Daniel W. Jones was commissioned by Brigham Young to start a Mormon colony within the Salt River Valley of the Arizona Territory. The settlement party arrived at what would become Lehi, Arizona in March 1877. Jones' invitation to local Native Americans to live with them became a point of controversy, and half of the initial colony left, moving on to found St. David, Arizona. In February 1878 the First Mesa Company arrived in Lehi. Rather than accepting an invitation to settle at Jones' settlement, they moved to the top of the mesa, and founded Mesa, Arizona. They dug irrigation canals, incorporating the original Hohokam canals in some places, and within a couple of months water was flowing through them.

Pima was founded in 1879 by Mormon settlers relocating from Forrest Dale, after that location was declared to be on tribal land. Originally named Smithville, it was unlike other Mormon settlements of the era, not being planned by the leaders of the church. Joseph K. Rogers was the first branch president at Pima, being appointed to this office before the settlers arrived. The branch was organized into a ward in 1880. In 1930 the total population of Pima was 980, 666 of whom were LDS, and a total of 1,260 people resided within the Pima ward boundaries.

== County Statistics ==
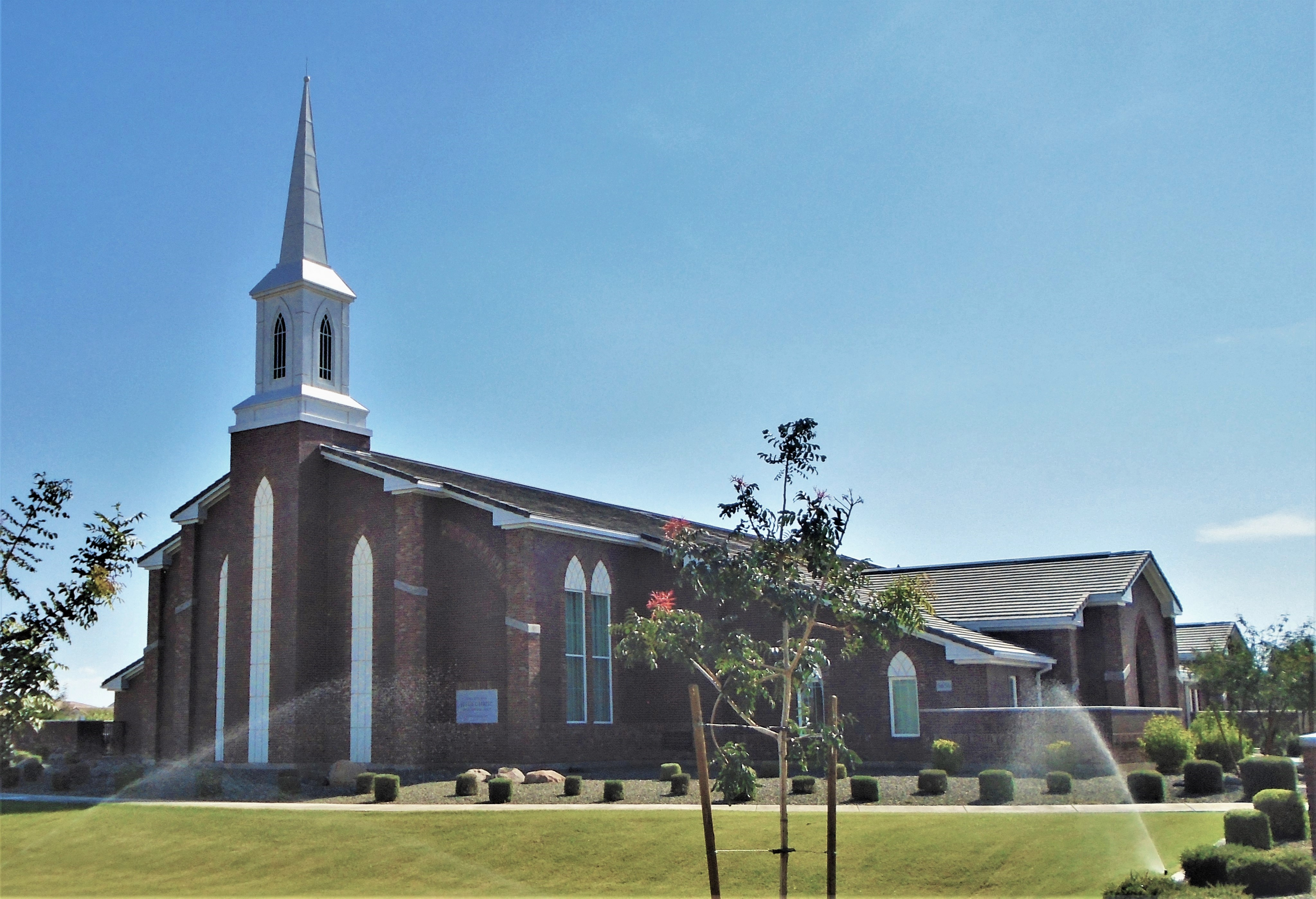
A meetinghouse for the LDS Church in Queen Creek, Arizona.

List of LDS Church adherents in each county as of 2010 according to the Association of Religion Data Archives: Note: Each county adherent count reflects meetinghouse location of congregation and not by location of residence. The census count reflects location of residence, which may skew percent of population where adherents reside in a different county as their congregational meetinghouse.

County	Congregations	Adherents	% of Population
Apache	27	14,950	20.90
Cochise	17	7,933	6.04
Coconino	32	16,633	12.37
Gila	12	4,719	8.81
Graham	29	11,766	31.61
Greenlee	3	1,221	14.47
La Paz	3	991	4.84
Maricopa	503	242,732	6.36
Mohave	12	8,147	4.07
Navajo	53	24,301	22.62
Pima	53	28,659	2.92
Pinal	31	14,082	3.75
Santa Cruz	1	876	1.85
Yavapai	22	9,608	4.55
Yuma	13	6,300	3.22

== Stakes ==
Stake/District	Organized	Mission	Temple
Arizona Central District (Correctional Facility)	4 May 2025		
Arizona Northwest District (Correctional Facility)	4 May 2025		
Arizona South District (Correctional Facility)	4 May 2025		
Buckeye Arizona Stake	13 Dec 1987	Arizona Tempe	Phoenix Arizona
Casa Grande Arizona Stake	13 Oct 1991	Arizona Gilbert	Gilbert Arizona
Centennial Arizona Stake	13 Nov 2016	Arizona Flagstaff	Snowflake Arizona
Chandler Arizona East Stake	17 Sep 2006	Arizona Gilbert	Gilbert Arizona
Chandler Arizona South Stake	28 Feb 2016	Arizona Tempe	Gilbert Arizona
Chandler Arizona Stake	3 Dec 1978	Arizona Tempe	Gilbert Arizona
Chandler Arizona West Stake	20 Oct 1996	Arizona Tempe	Gilbert Arizona
Chinle Arizona Stake	30 Sep 1990	New Mexico Farmington	Farmington New Mexico
Cottonwood Arizona Stake	22 Jan 1978	Arizona Flagstaff	Phoenix Arizona
Duncan Arizona Stake	24 Sep 1978	Arizona Tucson	Gila Valley
Eagar Arizona Stake	25 Jan 1987	Arizona Flagstaff	Snowflake Arizona
Flagstaff Arizona East Stake	7 May 2017	Arizona Flagstaff	Snowflake Arizona
Flagstaff Arizona West Stake	23 Sep 1956	Arizona Flagstaff	Snowflake Arizona
Gilbert Arizona Gateway Stake	17 Apr 2016	Arizona Gilbert	Gilbert Arizona
Gilbert Arizona Greenfield Stake	24 Aug 1975	Arizona Gilbert	Gilbert Arizona
Gilbert Arizona Highland East Stake	24 Nov 1996	Arizona Gilbert	Gilbert Arizona
Gilbert Arizona Highland West Stake	20 May 2012	Arizona Gilbert	Gilbert Arizona
Gilbert Arizona Higley Stake	31 Oct 2004	Arizona Gilbert	Gilbert Arizona
Gilbert Arizona San Tan Stake	3 Dec 2000	Arizona Gilbert	Gilbert Arizona
Gilbert Arizona Seville Stake	17 Feb 2008	Arizona Gilbert	Gilbert Arizona
Gilbert Arizona Stake	18 May 1997	Arizona Gilbert	Gilbert Arizona
Gilbert Arizona Stapley Stake	11 Oct 1981	Arizona Gilbert	Gilbert Arizona
Gilbert Arizona Superstition Springs Stake	12 Nov 2017	Arizona Gilbert	Gilbert Arizona
Gilbert Arizona Val Vista Stake	22 Nov 1987	Arizona Gilbert	Gilbert Arizona
Gilbert Arizona Williams Field Stake	28 Apr 2013	Arizona Gilbert	Gilbert Arizona
Gilbert Arizona YSA Stake	10 Jun 2012	Arizona Gilbert	Gilbert Arizona
Glendale Arizona North Stake	15 Feb 1981	Arizona Phoenix West	Phoenix Arizona
Glendale Arizona Stake	6 May 1973	Arizona Phoenix West	Phoenix Arizona
Globe Arizona Stake	16 Jun 1974	Arizona Mesa	Gilbert Arizona
Goodyear Arizona Stake	9 Dec 2007	Arizona Phoenix West	Phoenix Arizona
Heber Arizona Stake	7 Dec 2025	Arizona Flagstaff	Snowflake Arizona
Holbrook Arizona Stake	22 Nov 1970	Arizona Flagstaff	Snowflake Arizona
Hurricane Utah Stake (Note: Stake located outside Arizona with congregation(s) meeting in Arizona)	3 May 1987	Utah St George	Red Cliffs Utah
Kanab Utah Kaibab Stake	3 May 1987	Utah St George	Red Cliffs Utah
Kingman Arizona North Stake	29 Sep 2024	Nevada Henderson	Las Vegas Nevada
Kingman Arizona Stake	21 Aug 1983	Nevada Henderson	Las Vegas Nevada
Kirtland New Mexico Stake	19 Sep 1982	New Mexico Farmington	Farmington New Mexico
Lake Havasu City Arizona Stake	14 Mar 1976	Nevada Henderson	Las Vegas Nevada
Marana Arizona Stake	25 Oct 2015	Arizona Tucson	Tucson Arizona
Maricopa Arizona Stake	9 Dec 2007	Arizona Tempe	Gilbert Arizona
Mesa Arizona Alma Stake	10 Oct 1971	Arizona Mesa	Mesa Arizona
Mesa Arizona Alta Mesa Stake	14 Mar 1999	Arizona Mesa	Mesa Arizona
Mesa Arizona Boulder Creek Stake	5 Dec 1999	Arizona Gilbert	Gilbert Arizona
Mesa Arizona Central Stake	10 May 1981	Arizona Mesa	Mesa Arizona
Mesa Arizona Citrus Heights Stake	20 Sep 1992	Arizona Mesa	Mesa Arizona
Mesa Arizona Clearview Stake	12 Jun 2016	Arizona Mesa	Mesa Arizona
Mesa Arizona Desert Ridge Stake	18 Jan 2004	Arizona Mesa	Gilbert Arizona
Mesa Arizona East Stake	20 Nov 1955	Arizona Mesa	Mesa Arizona
Mesa Arizona Eastmark Stake	11 Jan 2015	Arizona Gilbert	Gilbert Arizona
Mesa Arizona Flatiron Stake	1 May 2016	Arizona Mesa	Mesa Arizona
Mesa Arizona Hermosa Vista Stake	21 Oct 2007	Arizona Mesa	Mesa Arizona
Mesa Arizona Kimball East Stake	14 Jan 1990	Arizona Mesa	Mesa Arizona
Mesa Arizona Kimball Stake	25 Nov 1979	Arizona Mesa	Mesa Arizona
Mesa Arizona Lehi Stake	6 May 1979	Arizona Mesa	Mesa Arizona
Mesa Arizona Maricopa North Stake	27 Feb 2000	Arizona Mesa	Mesa Arizona
Mesa Arizona Maricopa Stake	10 Dec 1882	Arizona Mesa	Mesa Arizona
Mesa Arizona Mountain View Stake	25 Jan 1987	Arizona Mesa	Mesa Arizona
Mesa Arizona North Stake	7 Nov 1971	Arizona Mesa	Mesa Arizona
Mesa Arizona Red Mountain Stake	6 Mar 2016	Arizona Mesa	Mesa Arizona
Mesa Arizona Salt River Stake	15 Feb 1976	Arizona Mesa	Mesa Arizona
Mesa Arizona Skyline Stake	3 Jun 2001	Arizona Mesa	Mesa Arizona
Mesa Arizona South Stake	18 Nov 1962	Arizona Mesa	Mesa Arizona
Mesa Arizona Stake	8 Dec 1946	Arizona Mesa	Mesa Arizona
Mesa Arizona YSA East Stake	10 Jun 2012	Arizona Mesa	Mesa Arizona
Mesa Arizona YSA West Stake	10 Jun 2012	Arizona Mesa	Mesa Arizona
Mesquite Nevada East Stake	13 Feb 1994	Utah St George	St. George Utah
Page Arizona Stake	10 Mar 1974	New Mexico Farmington	Red Cliffs Utah
Paradise Valley Arizona Stake	9 Sep 1979	Arizona Phoenix East	Mesa Arizona
Payson Arizona Stake	9 Apr 2000	Arizona Flagstaff	Mesa Arizona
Peoria Arizona North Stake	27 Feb 2000	Arizona Phoenix West	Phoenix Arizona
Peoria Arizona Stake	22 Feb 1987	Arizona Phoenix West	Phoenix Arizona
Peralta Trail Arizona Stake	16 Nov 1986	Arizona Mesa	Mesa Arizona
Phoenix Arizona Deer Valley Stake	8 Feb 1981	Arizona Phoenix East	Phoenix Arizona
Phoenix Arizona Desert Hills Stake	16 Oct 2016	Arizona Phoenix East	Phoenix Arizona
Phoenix Arizona East Stake	28 Mar 1954	Arizona Phoenix East	Mesa Arizona
Phoenix Arizona North Stake	19 Jan 1958	Arizona Phoenix East	Phoenix Arizona
Phoenix Arizona South Mountain Stake	21 Aug 2016	Arizona Tempe	Phoenix Arizona
Phoenix Arizona Stake	27 Feb 1938	Arizona Phoenix East	Phoenix Arizona
Phoenix Arizona Thunderbird Park Stake	9 Oct 2016	Arizona Phoenix West	Phoenix Arizona
Phoenix Arizona West Stake	5 Mar 1978	Arizona Phoenix West	Phoenix Arizona
Phoenix Arizona YSA Stake	10 Jun 2012	Arizona Phoenix West	Phoenix Arizona
Pima Arizona Stake	17 Nov 1991	Arizona Tucson	Gila Valley
Prescott Arizona Stake	7 Jun 1970	Arizona Flagstaff	Phoenix Arizona
Prescott Valley Arizona Stake	13 Mar 2011	Arizona Flagstaff	Phoenix Arizona
Queen Creek Arizona Central Stake	10 Apr 2016	Arizona Gilbert	Gilbert Arizona
Queen Creek Arizona East Stake	31 Oct 2004	Arizona Gilbert	Gilbert Arizona
Queen Creek Arizona Empire Stake	29 Jan 2023	Arizona Gilbert	Gilbert Arizona
Queen Creek Arizona Frontier Stake	1 Mar 2026	Arizona Gilbert	Gilbert Arizona
Queen Creek Arizona Heritage Stake	13 Sep 2020	Arizona Gilbert	Gilbert Arizona
Queen Creek Arizona North Stake	17 Feb 2008	Arizona Gilbert	Gilbert Arizona
Queen Creek Arizona Ocotillo Stake	14 Jan 2018	Arizona Gilbert	Gilbert Arizona
Queen Creek Arizona South Stake	30 Oct 2005	Arizona Gilbert	Gilbert Arizona
Queen Creek Arizona Stake	27 Oct 2002	Arizona Gilbert	Gilbert Arizona
Queen Creek Arizona West Stake	21 Sep 2014	Arizona Gilbert	Gilbert Arizona
Safford Arizona Stake	20 Feb 1938	Arizona Tucson	Gila Valley
Sahuarita Arizona Stake	21 Jun 2009	Arizona Tucson	Tucson Arizona
San Tan Valley Arizona North Stake	21 Aug 2016	Arizona Gilbert	Gilbert Arizona
San Tan Valley Arizona Stake	16 Mar 2014	Arizona Gilbert	Gilbert Arizona
Scottsdale Arizona Camelback Stake	22 Mar 1981	Arizona Phoenix East	Mesa Arizona
Scottsdale Arizona North Stake	9 Dec 1962	Arizona Phoenix East	Mesa Arizona
Show Low Arizona Stake	24 Nov 1974	Arizona Flagstaff	Snowflake Arizona
Sierra Vista Arizona Stake	6 Jun 1982	Arizona Tucson	Tucson Arizona
Silver Creek Arizona Stake	30 Nov 1980	Arizona Flagstaff	Snowflake Arizona
Snowflake Arizona Pioneer Stake	4 May 2025	Arizona Flagstaff	Snowflake Arizona
Snowflake Arizona Stake	18 Dec 1887	Arizona Flagstaff	Snowflake Arizona
St David Arizona Stake	2 Mar 1941	Arizona Tucson	Gila Valley
St Johns Arizona Stake	23 Jul 1887	Arizona Flagstaff	Snowflake Arizona
Surprise Arizona North Stake	16 Aug 2009	Arizona Phoenix West	Phoenix Arizona
Surprise Arizona Stake	16 Jan 2005	Arizona Phoenix West	Phoenix Arizona
Surprise Arizona West Stake	11 Dec 2016	Arizona Phoenix West	Phoenix Arizona
Tempe Arizona South Stake	18 Jan 1976	Arizona Tempe	Gilbert Arizona
Tempe Arizona Stake	2 Feb 1964	Arizona Tempe	Mesa Arizona
Tempe Arizona West Stake	8 Jan 1989	Arizona Tempe	Gilbert Arizona
Tempe Arizona YSA Stake	12 Dec 1971	Arizona Tempe	Mesa Arizona
Thatcher Arizona Stake	25 Feb 1883	Arizona Tucson	Gila Valley
Tuba City Arizona Stake	25 Jun 1995	New Mexico Farmington	Snowflake Arizona
Tucson Arizona East Stake	6 Nov 1977	Arizona Tucson	Tucson Arizona
Tucson Arizona North Stake	2 Feb 1969	Arizona Tucson	Tucson Arizona
Tucson Arizona Rincon Stake	3 Mar 1985	Arizona Tucson	Tucson Arizona
Tucson Arizona South Stake	6 Dec 2015	Arizona Tucson	Tucson Arizona
Tucson Arizona Stake	2 Dec 1956	Arizona Tucson	Tucson Arizona
Tucson Arizona West Stake	24 Nov 1996	Arizona Tucson	Tucson Arizona
White Mountain Arizona Stake	26 Mar 1995	Arizona Flagstaff	Snowflake Arizona
Winslow Arizona Stake	17 Sep 1978	Arizona Flagstaff	Snowflake Arizona
Yuma Arizona Stake	27 Apr 1958	Arizona Tempe	San Diego California

== Missions ==
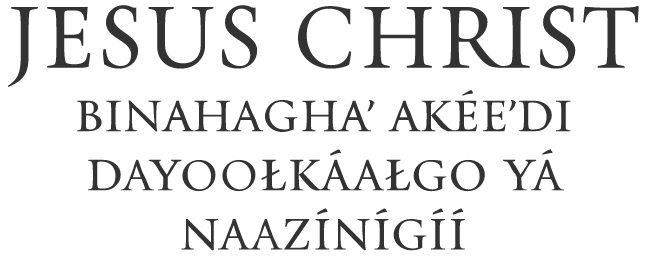
Church logo in Navajo

On March 7, 1943, the Navajo-Zuni Mission was organized, and specialized with teaching Native Americans in their language. This was renamed the Southwest Indian Mission on January 1, 1949, and again the New Mexico-Arizona Mission on October 10, 1972. It was discontinued and transferred into the Arizona Phoenix Mission on July 1, 1984.

On August 1, 1969, the Arizona Mission was organized from the California South Mission, and was renamed the Arizona Tempe Mission on June 20, 1974.

Mission	Organized
Arizona Gilbert Mission	July 1, 2013
Arizona Mesa Mission	July 1, 2002
Arizona Phoenix East Mission	July 1. 2026
Arizona Phoenix West Mission	July 1, 1984
Arizona Flagstaff Mission	July 1, 2013
Arizona Tempe Mission	August 1, 1969
Arizona Tucson Mission	July 1, 1990

Also, the Nevada Las Vegas Mission, the New Mexico Farmington Mission, and the Utah St George Mission covers portions of the state.

== Temples ==
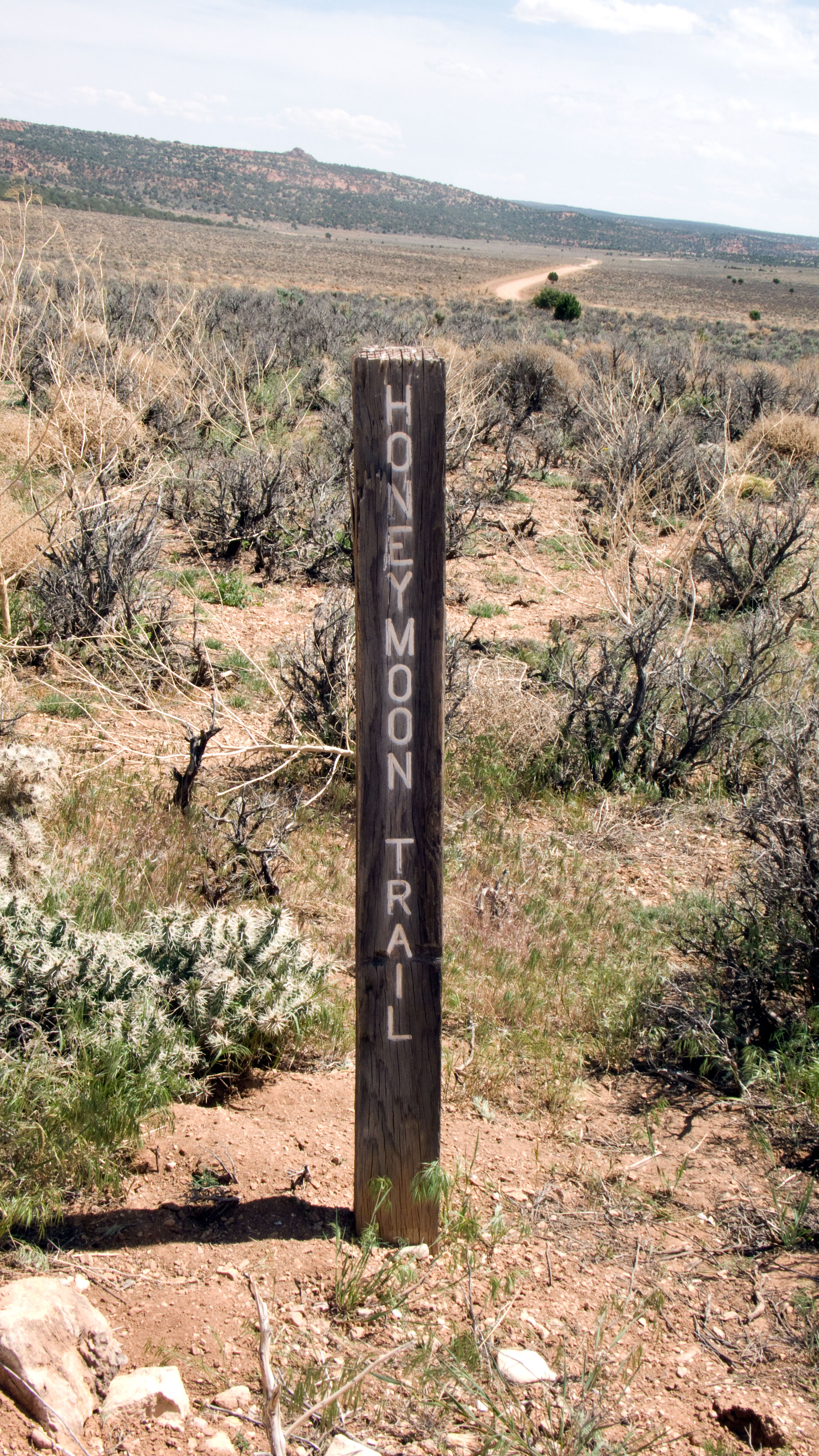
Route marker on House Rock Valley Road for the Honeymoon Trail, which included part of this road

Temples in Arizona ()
- = Operating
- = Under construction
- = Announced
- = Temporarily Closed

On October 23, 1927, the Mesa Arizona Temple was dedicated. Until that time, members had traveled to the St. George Temple. Because of all the bridal parties that traversed the trail during the early years, the wagon road between St. George and the Arizona settlements became known as the Honeymoon Trail. The Mesa Arizona Temple was the first temple in the Church to be rededicated (on April 15, 1975) after extensive remodeling and enlarging to accommodate increased attendance.

On March 3, 2002, a second Arizona temple was dedicated in Snowflake. Since then, a third, The Gila Valley Arizona Temple has been dedicated in Central, Arizona and three additional temples have been dedicated in Gilbert, Phoenix, and Tucson.

7. Mesa Arizona Temple; Official website; News & images	
Location: Announced: Groundbreaking: Dedicated: Rededicated: Size: Style: Notes:	Mesa, Arizona, United States; October 3, 1919 by Heber J. Grant; April 25, 1922 by Heber J. Grant; October 23, 1927 by Heber J. Grant; April 16, 1975 by Spencer W. Kimball; 113,916 sq ft (10,583.1 m^{2}) on a 20-acre (8.1 ha) site Neoclassical Architecture - designed by Don Carlos Young, Jr. and Ramm Hansen; The first temple to offer ordinances in a language other than English (Spanish).
108. Snowflake Arizona Temple; Official website; News & images	
Location: Announced: Groundbreaking: Dedicated: Size: Style:	Snowflake, Arizona, U.S. April 2, 2000 by Gordon B. Hinckley; September 23, 2000 by Rex D. Pinegar; March 3, 2002 by Gordon B. Hinckley; 18,621 sq ft (1,729.9 m^{2}) on a 7.5-acre (3.0 ha) site Classic modern, single-spire design - designed by Trest Polina
132. Gila Valley Arizona Temple; Official website; News & images	
Location: Announced: Groundbreaking: Dedicated: Size: Style:	Central, Arizona, United States; April 26, 2008 by Thomas S. Monson; February 14, 2009 by Neil L. Andersen; May 23, 2010 by Thomas S. Monson; 18,561 sq ft (1,724.4 m^{2}) on a 17-acre (6.9 ha) site {{{design}}} - designed by Gregory B. Lambright
142. Gilbert Arizona Temple; Official website; News & images	
Location: Announced: Groundbreaking: Dedicated: Size: Style: Notes:	Gilbert, Arizona, U.S. April 26, 2008 by Thomas S. Monson; November 13, 2010 by Claudio R. M. Costa; March 2, 2014 by Henry B. Eyring & Thomas S. Monson; 85,326 sq ft (7,927.0 m^{2}) on a 15.38-acre (6.22 ha) site Neoclassical center spire Announced by Thomas S. Monson on April 26, 2008, to be built on the southeast corner of Pecos and Greenfield Roads. A public open house was held from January 18 to February 15, 2014. The temple was formally dedicated on March 2, 2014.
144. Phoenix Arizona Temple; Official website; News & images	
Location: Announced: Groundbreaking: Dedicated: Size: Notes:	Phoenix, Arizona, U.S. May 24, 2008 by Thomas S. Monson; June 4, 2011 by Ronald A. Rasband; November 16, 2014 by Thomas S. Monson; 64,870 sq ft (6,027 m^{2}) on a 5.19-acre (2.10 ha) site A public open house was held from October 10 to November 1, 2014.
157. Tucson Arizona Temple; Official website; News & images	
Location: Announced: Groundbreaking: Dedicated: Size:	Catalina Foothills, Arizona, U.S. October 6, 2012 by Thomas S. Monson; October 17, 2015 by Dieter F. Uchtdorf; August 13, 2017 by Dieter F. Uchtdorf; 38,216 sq ft (3,550.4 m^{2}) on a 7-acre (2.8 ha) site
345. Yuma Arizona Temple (Site announced); Official website; News & images	
Location: Announced: Size:	Yuma, Arizona, United States; 7 April 2024 by Russell M. Nelson; 18,500 sq ft (1,720 m^{2}) on a 7-acre (2.8 ha) site
363. Queen Creek Arizona Temple (Announced); Official website; News & images	
Location: Announced:	Queen Creek, Arizona, United States; 6 October 2024 by Russell M. Nelson
378. Flagstaff Arizona Temple (Site announced); Official website; News & images	
Location: Announced: Size:	Flagstaff, Arizona; 6 April 2025 by Russell M. Nelson; 19,000 sq ft (1,800 m^{2}) on a 7.6-acre (3.1 ha) site

== Communities ==
Latter-day Saints have had a significant role in establishing, settling, and/or populating communities within the "Mormon Corridor", including the following in Arizona:

- Beaver Dam
- Brigham City (ghost town)
- Central
- Eagar
- Fredonia
- Gilbert
- Heber-Overgaard
- Joseph City
- Layton (absorbed by Safford)
- Lee's Ferry
- Lehi (annexed by Mesa)
- Littlefield
- Maryvale in Phoenix
- Mesa
- Mormon Lake
- Obed (ghost town)
- Pomerene
- Pima
- Pine
- Pipe Spring
- Queen Creek
- Safford
- Scottsdale
- St. David
- St. Johns
- Snowflake
- Sunset (ghost town)
- Taylor
- Thatcher
- Tuba City
- Wilford
- Woodruff

== Notable people ==
*Philemon C. Merrill
- Matt Salmon
- John K. Carmack
- Junius Driggs
- Jake Flake
- Jeff Flake
- William J. Flake
- Francis M. Gibbons
- Jacob Hamblin
- Charles E. Jones (judge)
- Daniel Webster Jones (Mormon)
- David Patten Kimball
- Spencer W. Kimball
- Rex E. Lee
- Evan Mecham
- Fred Mortensen
- Charles Sreeve Peterson
- Miles Park Romney
- Eric B. Shumway
- Jesse N. Smith
- Lot Smith
- Delbert L. Stapley
- David King Udall
- Ida Hunt Udall
- Udall family
- Bob Worsley

== See also ==
- Religion in Arizona
- Aztec Land & Cattle Company (1884–1902)
- Mormon colonies in Mexico
- Mormon Corridor
- State of Deseret
- The Church of Jesus Christ of Latter-day Saints membership statistics (United States)
- John Willard Young
