= Pima, Arizona =

Town in Graham County, Arizona, United States

- Town
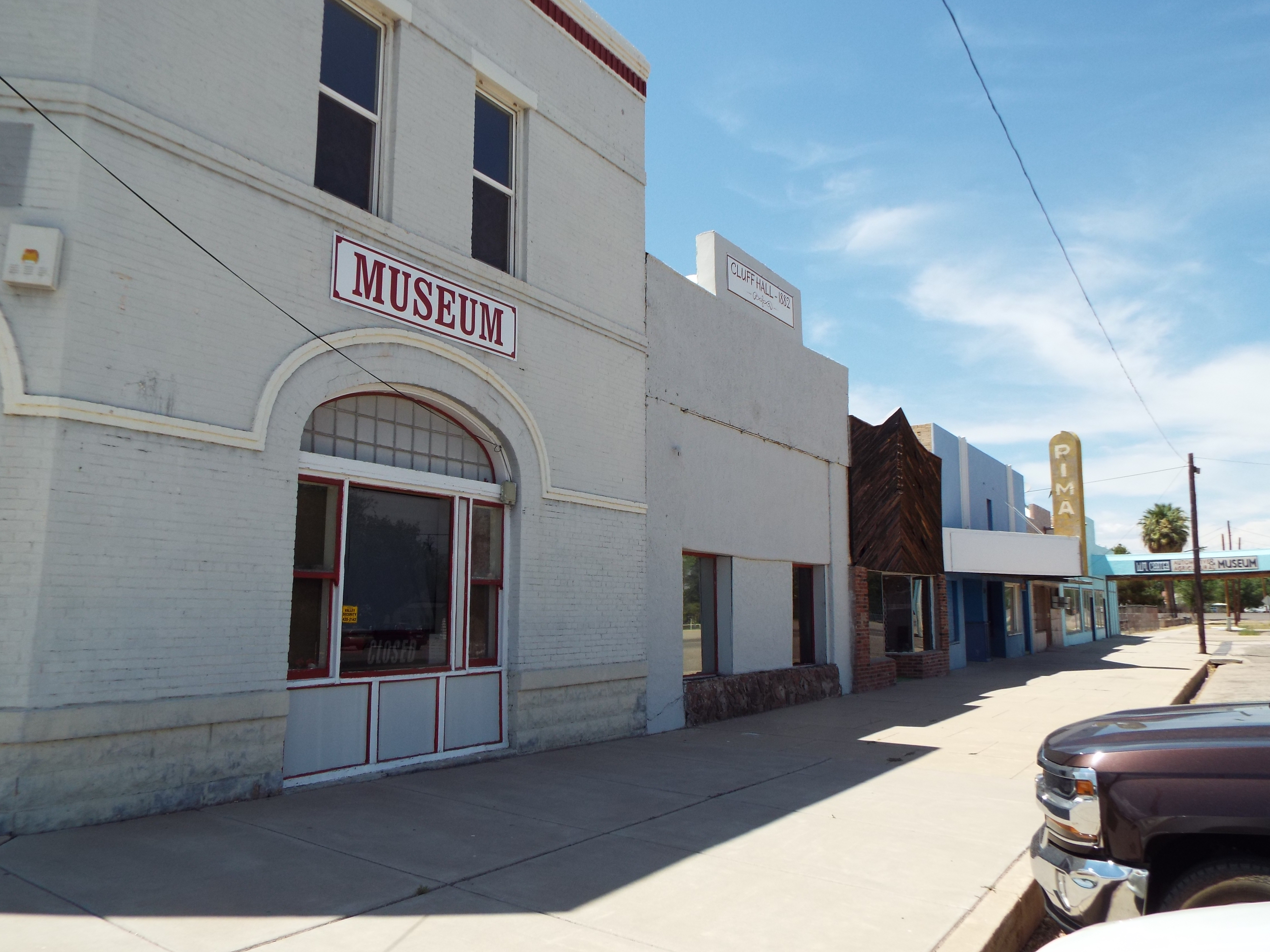
- Downtown Pima

- Flag
- Motto: "Pioneers of the Valley"
- Location of Pima in Graham County, Arizona.

- Location in the United States
- Coordinates: 32°52′32″N 109°50′05″W
- Country: United States
- State: Arizona
- County: Graham

Area
  - Total: 7.36 sq mi (19.05 km^{2})
  - Land: 7.30 sq mi (18.90 km^{2})
  - Water: 0.062 sq mi (0.16 km^{2})
- Elevation: 2,881 ft (878 m)

Population (2020)
  - Total: 2,847
  - Density: 390.2/sq mi (150.67/km^{2})
- Time zone: UTC-7 (MST (no DST))
- ZIP codes: 85535, 85543
- Area code: 928
- FIPS code: 04-55560
- GNIS feature ID: 2413130
- Website: www.pimatown.az.gov

Pima is a town in Graham County, Arizona, United States. As of the 2020 census, Pima had a population of 2,847. Pima is part of the Safford Micropolitan Statistical Area.

Despite its name, it is not located in nearby Pima County.

== History ==
Pima was settled by Mormon settlers in 1879. It was originally named "Smithville". The first settlers had been living in Forrest Dale, but then were told they had to leave because the location was on Indian land. Unlike other Mormon settlements of the era, Smithville was not planned by the leaders of the church.

Joseph K. Rogers was the first branch president at Pima, being appointed to this office before any of the settlers arrived. The branch was organized into a ward in 1880. In 1930 the ward had 666 members. Pima had a population of 980, and a total of 1,260 people resided within the boundaries of the Pima ward. In 1990 Pima had 1,725 residents.

In 1882 Jesse N. Smith predicted that a Mormon temple would one day be built in Pima. The Gila Valley Arizona Temple is currently at a site between Pima and Thatcher in Central, Arizona, within the boundaries of the Pima Arizona Stake of the Church.

== Geography ==
Pima is located in central Graham County in the valley of the Gila River. U.S. Route 70 passes through the town, leading southeast 8 miles (13 km) to Safford, the county seat, and northwest 68 miles (109 km) to Globe.

According to the United States Census Bureau, the town has a total area of 5.9 square miles (15.4 km^{2}), of which 0.04 square miles (0.1 km^{2}), or 0.76%, is water.

== Demographics ==
Historical population
Census	Pop.	Note	%±
1890	750		—
1900	521		−30.5%
1910	500		−4.0%
1920	515		3.0%
1930	980		90.3%
1940	867		−11.5%
1950	824		−5.0%
1960	806		−2.2%
1970	1,184		46.9%
1980	1,599		35.1%
1990	1,725		7.9%
2000	1,989		15.3%
2010	2,387		20.0%
2020	2,847		19.3%
U.S. Decennial Census

=== 2020 census ===
As of the 2020 census, Pima had a population of 2,847. The median age was 30.6 years. 34.5% of residents were under the age of 18 and 13.4% of residents were 65 years of age or older. For every 100 females there were 101.8 males, and for every 100 females age 18 and over there were 98.8 males age 18 and over.

0.0% of residents lived in urban areas, while 100.0% lived in rural areas.

There were 894 households in Pima, of which 45.6% had children under the age of 18 living in them. Of all households, 58.9% were married-couple households, 14.8% were households with a male householder and no spouse or partner present, and 20.9% were households with a female householder and no spouse or partner present. About 16.7% of all households were made up of individuals and 10.0% had someone living alone who was 65 years of age or older.

There were 971 housing units, of which 7.9% were vacant. The homeowner vacancy rate was 1.3% and the rental vacancy rate was 4.3%.

Racial composition as of the 2020 census
Race	Number	Percent
White	2,402	84.4%
Black or African American	7	0.2%
American Indian and Alaska Native	37	1.3%
Asian	3	0.1%
Native Hawaiian and Other Pacific Islander	1	0.0%
Some other race	164	5.8%
Two or more races	233	8.2%
Hispanic or Latino (of any race)	721	25.3%

=== 2000 census ===
As of the census of 2000, there were 1,989 people, 663 households, and 521 families residing in the town. The population density was 787.0 inhabitants per square mile (303.9/km^{2}). There were 735 housing units at an average density of 290.8 per square mile (112.3/km^{2}). The racial makeup of the town was 87.0% White, 0.2% Black or African American, 0.8% Native American, 0.1% Asian, 9.9% from other races, and 2.1% from two or more races. 20.1% of the population were Hispanic or Latino of any race.

There were 663 households, out of which 42.5% had children under the age of 18 living with them, 63.3% were married couples living together, 10.6% had a female householder with no husband present, and 21.4% were non-families. 18.4% of all households were made up of individuals, and 10.3% had someone living alone who was 65 years of age or older. The average household size was 3.00 and the average family size was 3.43.

In the town, the population was spread out, with 34.3% under the age of 18, 9.8% from 18 to 24, 23.4% from 25 to 44, 18.3% from 45 to 64, and 14.2% who were 65 years of age or older. The median age was 30 years. For every 100 females, there were 97.3 males. For every 100 females age 18 and over, there were 89.8 males.

The median income for a household in the town was $30,985, and the median income for a family was $34,900. Males had a median income of $31,765 versus $21,042 for females. The per capita income for the town was $12,896. About 15.0% of families and 19.4% of the population were below the poverty line, including 25.3% of those under age 18 and 15.6% of those age 65 or over.

== Gallery ==
Historic Buildings
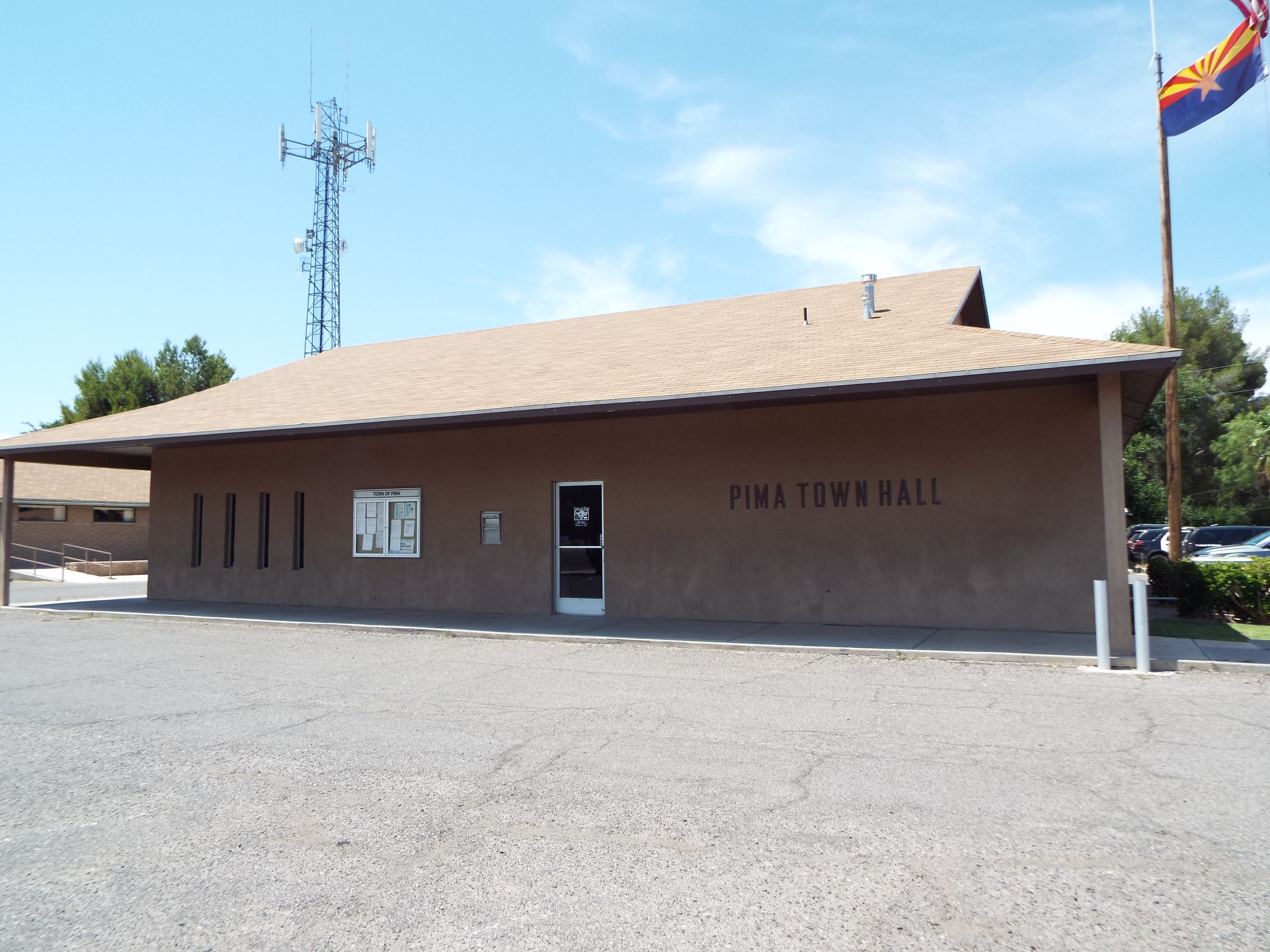
Pima Town Hall

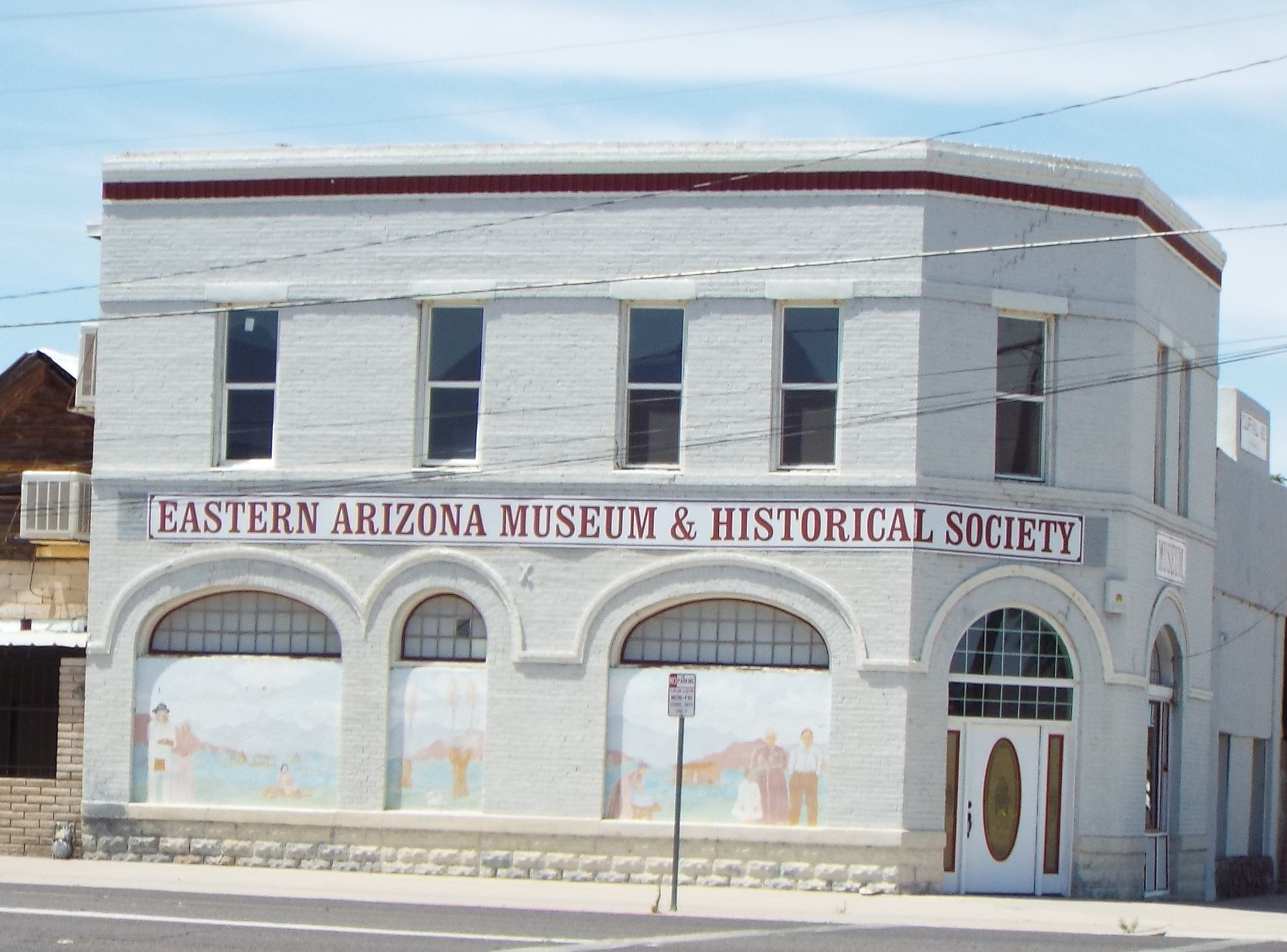
Former Bank of Pima building

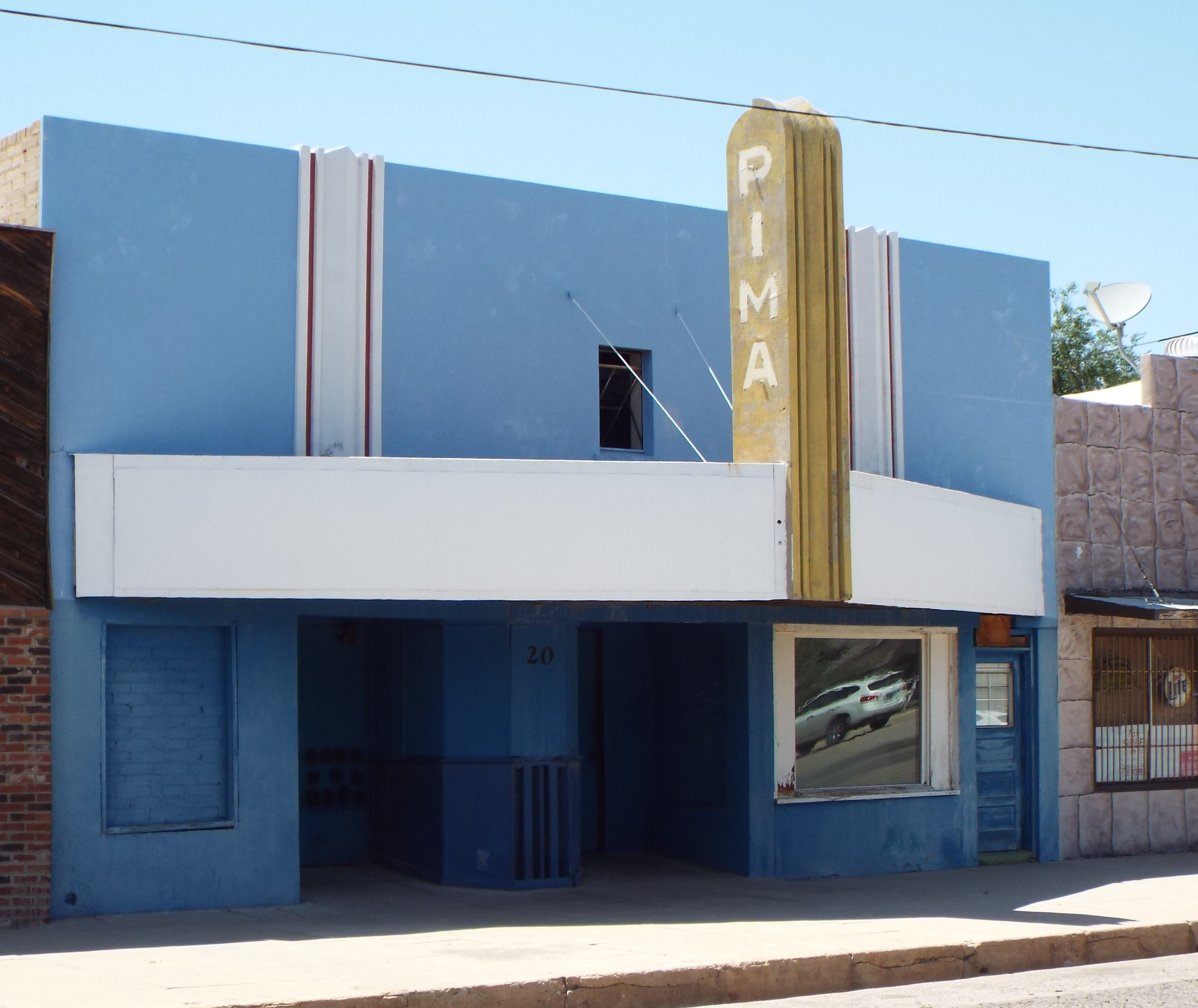
Pima Theater built in 1930

== Transportation ==
San Carlos Apache Nnee Bich'o Nii Transit provides transportation from Pima to the San Carlos Apache Indian Reservation, Safford and Globe.

== See also ==
- List of municipalities in Arizona
- The Church of Jesus Christ of Latter-day Saints in Arizona
