= Jesse N. Smith =

American politician (1934–1906)

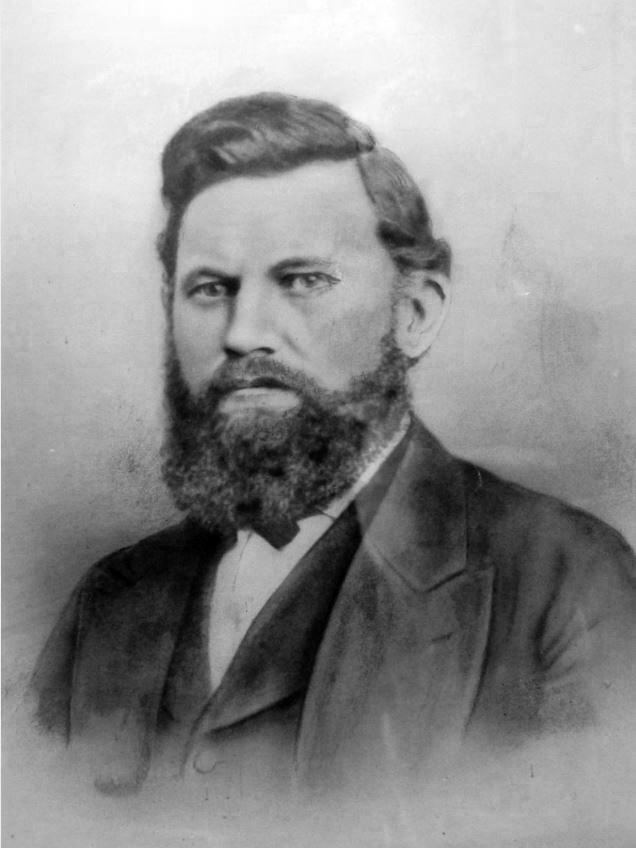
- Family lithograph of Jesse N. Smith

19th Arizona Territorial Legislature

In office
- 1897

24th Utah Territorial Legislatures

In office
- January 12, 1880

22nd Utah Territorial Legislatures

In office
- January 10, 1876

5th Utah Territorial Legislature

In office
- 1855 – 1856

Mayor of Parowan

In office
- 1859 – 1861

Personal details
- Born: Jesse Nathaniel Smith; December 2, 1834; Stockholm, New York, United States
- Died: June 5, 1906 (aged 71); Snowflake, Arizona, United States
- Resting place: R V Mike Ramsay Memorial Cemetery; 34.504°N 110.087°W
- Spouse(s): 5
- Children: 44
- Parents: Silas Smith; Mary Aikens
- Website: www.jessensmith.org

Jesse Nathaniel Smith (December 2, 1834 – June 5, 1906) was a Mormon pioneer, church leader, colonizer, politician and frontiersman. He was a member of the Church of Jesus Christ of Latter-day Saints (LDS Church). He was a first cousin to Joseph Smith, founder of the Latter Day Saint movement.

== Early life ==
Jesse N. Smith was born the youngest of three sons to Silas Smith (1779–1839) and his second wife Mary Aikens (1797–1877) in Stockholm, New York. Both of Smith's grandfathers, Asael Smith (1744–1830) and Nathaniel Aikens (1757–1836), served in the American Revolutionary War. According to Smith, his grandfather Aikens served under General George Washington. Smith's father, Silas, married his first wife, Ruth Stevens, in 1806. Together they had seven children: Charles, Charity, Curtis Stevens, Samuel, Stephen, Susan and Asahel. After the death of his first wife, Silas courted Mary Aikens while she was teaching school in Stockholm and they married in 1828. The oldest child of this union was Silas Sanford Smith (1830–1910) followed by John Aikens Smith (1832–1838). Unfortunately John died due to exposure and unfit conditions from mob persecutions.

Jesse's father was a younger brother of Joseph Smith Sr., making Jesse N. a first cousin of Joseph Smith Jr. Silas was converted when Joseph Sr. and his youngest son Don Carlos Smith visited him in 1830, but was not baptized into the church until 1835 by his nephew Hyrum Smith. Mary joined the church a couple of years later after they moved to Kirtland, Ohio. Mob persecutions sent this Smith family first towards Far West, Missouri and when they learned about Lilburn W. Boggs' Missouri Executive Order 44, nicknamed the "extermination order", they turned back to Illinois. John Aikens died near Louisiana, Missouri and then Silas died while living near Pittsfield, Illinois. Mary was left a widow to raise her two young boys.

Smith's cousin William tried to persuade Mary Aikens Smith against following Brigham Young, but she followed the main body of Latter Day Saints west to the Utah Territory. At the age of twelve, Jesse N. drove his Uncle John's two yokes of oxen on the journey.

== Church service ==
Smith served in many leadership positions for the LDS Church. His cousin George A. Smith, serving as a member of the Quorum of the Twelve Apostles, sent a letter informing him he was to serve as a missionary in Europe. When he arrived in Salt Lake City for departure he was told he would serve in the Scandinavia Mission. In the spring of 1862, at the age of 27, he was asked by Brigham Young to serve as Mission president of that mission. He went home for a brief period, but returned to the Scandinavian Mission again in 1868 to serve as mission president for a second time. He assisted almost 3,000 members of the church in emigrating to America. Smith learned to read and speak Danish on his missions.

Smith served as the first Stake President of the Eastern Arizona Stake from 1879 to 1887 followed by the Snowflake Stake from 1887 until his death. In 1882, he predicted that a temple would be built in Pima, Arizona. The Gila Valley Arizona Temple is between Pima and Thatcher.

== Colonizer ==
Smith helped colonize different Mormon settlements. The church leadership asked him, his mother and brother to help settle Parowan, Utah in 1851. He also helped in creating the settlement of Minersville. In 1878 he went to explore an area in the Arizona Territory where Mormon settlements were being established. Smith returned to report his findings to John Taylor, who had succeeded Young. Taylor asked Smith to relocate there as a church leader. He settled his family in what is now Snowflake, Arizona. In 1884, he was assigned to a committee for the church to purchase land in Mexico for Mormon colonization.

== Statesman ==
Smith was involved in local politics throughout his adult life. He served as Mayor of Parowan from 1859 to 1861, as a member of the 5th Utah Territorial Legislature in 1855–56, the 22nd Utah Territorial Legislature in 1876 and the 24th Utah Territorial Legislature in 1880, and in the 19th Arizona Territorial Legislature in 1897. He was elected probate judge of Iron County in 1866 by Utah Territory Legislators and again appointed by the Arizona territorial governor. He served as a captain in the local militia while in Utah Territory. He also held the positions of Deputy U.S. Marshal, Iron County District Attorney, surveyor, city clerk, town councilman, city magistrate, stockman and established cooperative mercantiles in both Utah and Arizona.

== Wives and children ==
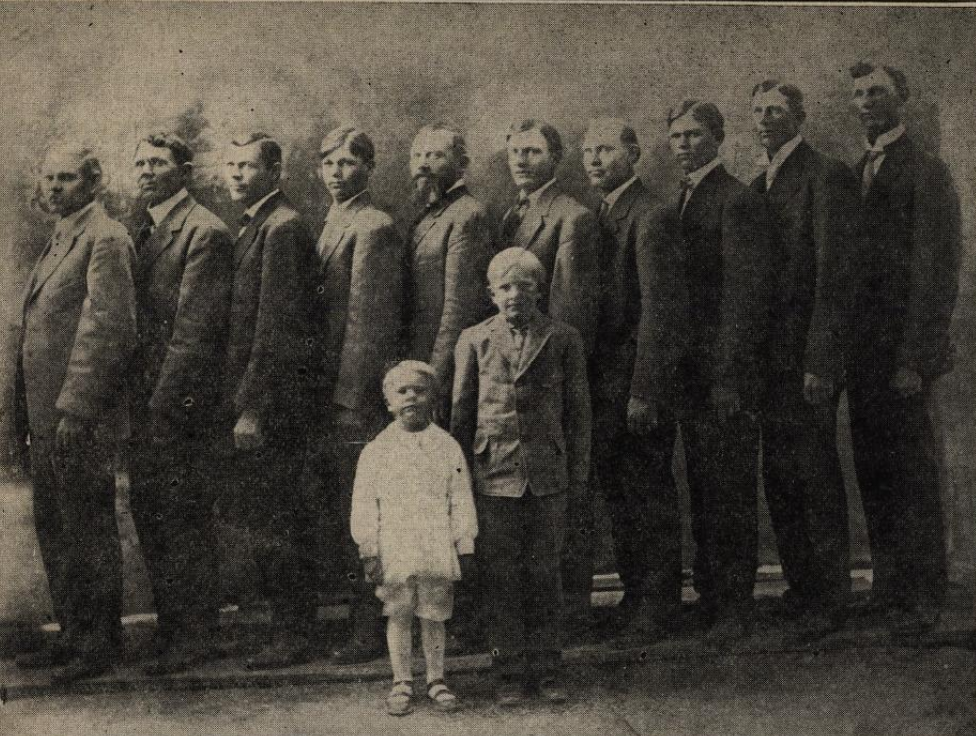
Sons of Jesse N. Smith.

Smith practiced plural marriage. He had five wives and forty-four children. Smith was eighteen years old when his oldest child was born and seventy when his youngest was born. Of the forty-four children, forty-two lived to adulthood, forty were married and thirty-eight had children.

== Death ==
Jesse N. Smith died unexpectedly at his home in Snowflake after battling an illness. Four of his five wives survived him at his death.

== Notable relations ==
- Nephew of Joseph Smith, Sr., Lucy Mack Smith and John Smith
- 1st cousin of Joseph Smith
- 1st cousin of Hyrum Smith
- 1st cousin of Elias Smith
- 1st cousin of Samuel H. Smith
- 1st cousin of William Smith
- 1st cousin of Don Carlos Smith
- 1st cousin of George A. Smith
- 1st cousin, once removed, of John Smith
- 1st cousin, once removed, of Joseph Smith III
- 1st cousin, once removed, of Joseph F. Smith
- 1st cousin, once removed, of Alexander H. Smith
- 1st cousin, once removed, of David Hyrum Smith
- 1st cousin, once removed, of John Henry Smith
- 1st cousin, twice removed, of George Albert Smith
- 1st cousin, twice removed, of Hyrum M. Smith
- 1st cousin, twice removed, of Joseph Fielding Smith
- Great grandfather of Jake Flake
- 3rd great grandfather of Jeff Groscost
- 2nd great grandfather of Jeff Flake
- Daughter Leah married John Hunt Udall
- Son Asahel H. married Pauline Udall, daughter of David King Udall

== See also ==
- The Church of Jesus Christ of Latter-day Saints in Arizona
- List of people with the most children
