= Joseph City Unified School District =

School district in Joseph City, Navajo County, Arizona

Coordinates: 34°57′33″N 110°19′20″W

Joseph City Junior/Senior High School

Location
- 4629 East 2nd North; Joseph City, Arizona 86032; United States

Information
- School type: Public high school
- Motto: "Tradition of Excellence"
- School district: Joseph City Unified School District
- Principal: Eric Miller
- Grades: 6-12
- Enrollment: 119 high school students (2017-18)
- Colors: Navy and gold
- Mascot: Wildcats
- Website: www.jcusd.org

Joseph City Unified School District #2, also known as Joseph City Schools, is a school district headquartered in Joseph City, Arizona.

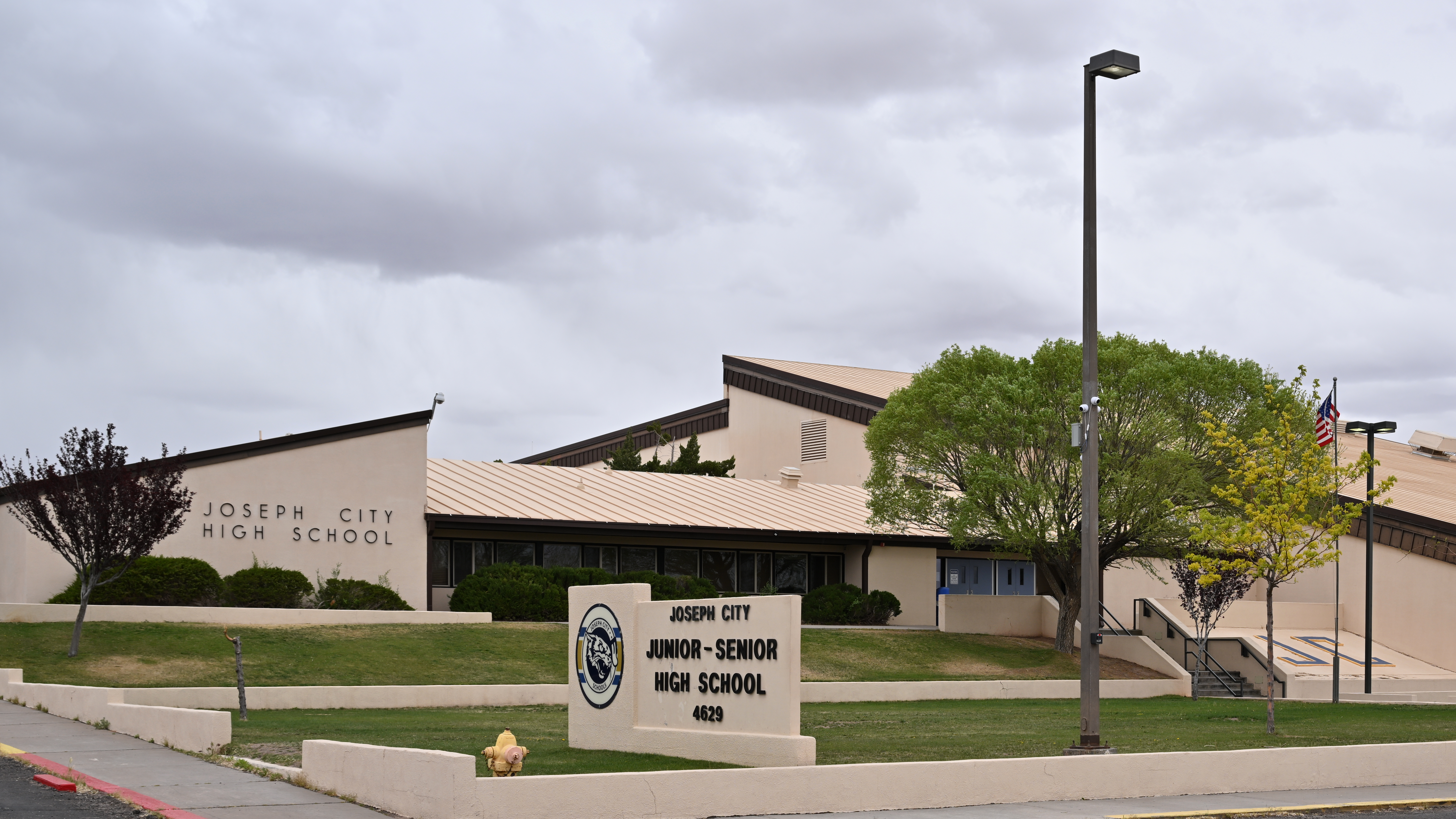
Front of Joseph City High School

Joseph City Junior/Senior High School is its junior high and high school. The district also operates an elementary school.

The district includes Joseph City, a portion of Dilkon, and a very small part of land from Holbrook.

== History ==
In 2013 the district leadership asked voters to approve an "override" of its budget. The measure succeeded, with 180 approving and 77 rejecting, a 70%-30% basis. There were 257 votes total.
