= Obed, Arizona =

Ghost town in Navajo County, Arizona, US

- Ghost town
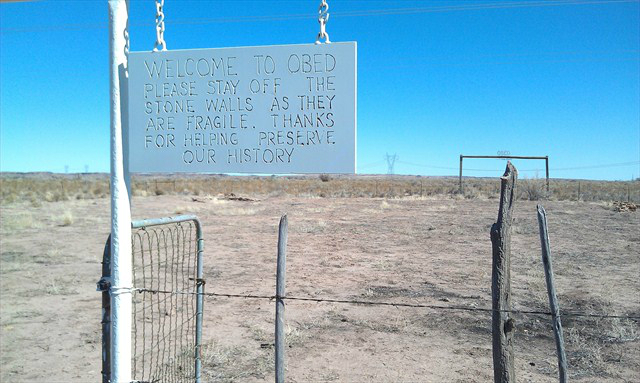

- Location within Arizona Location within the United States
- Coordinates: 34°54′58″N 110°19′25″W
- Country: United States
- State: Arizona
- County: Navajo
- Founded: 1876
- Abandoned: 1877
- Founder: George Lake and Company
- Elevation: 5,023 ft (1,531 m)
- Time zone: UTC-7 (MST (no DST))
  - Summer (DST): UTC-7 (MST)

Obed was a town in Navajo County, Arizona, located approximately three miles south of Joseph City, Arizona. It was settled in 1876 by a group of members of the Church of Jesus Christ of Latter-day Saints under the direction of George Lake.

The settlers built a fort that was twelve rods square with walls that were ten feet high. It had bastions, with portholes for defense at two corners and additional portholes in the surrounding walls. The camp consisted of 123 members, which included John Bloomfield and his wife and nine children. Cottonwood was sawed for lumber. The community had a school house in January 1877 and a denominational school was started the next month, with Phoebe McNeal as teacher.

Numerous problems plagued the settlement. The site was malarial, was selected against LDS Church instruction, and had trouble with brush and log dams washing away. The population took chills and fever and finally abandoned the settlement in March 1877.

Obed was one of four Little Colorado River colonies. The other colonies were Joseph City, Brigham City, and Sunset. Joseph City is the only remaining colony.

== See also ==
- The Church of Jesus Christ of Latter-day Saints in Arizona
