= Joseph City, Arizona =

Unincorporated community in the state of Arizona, United States

- Census-designated place
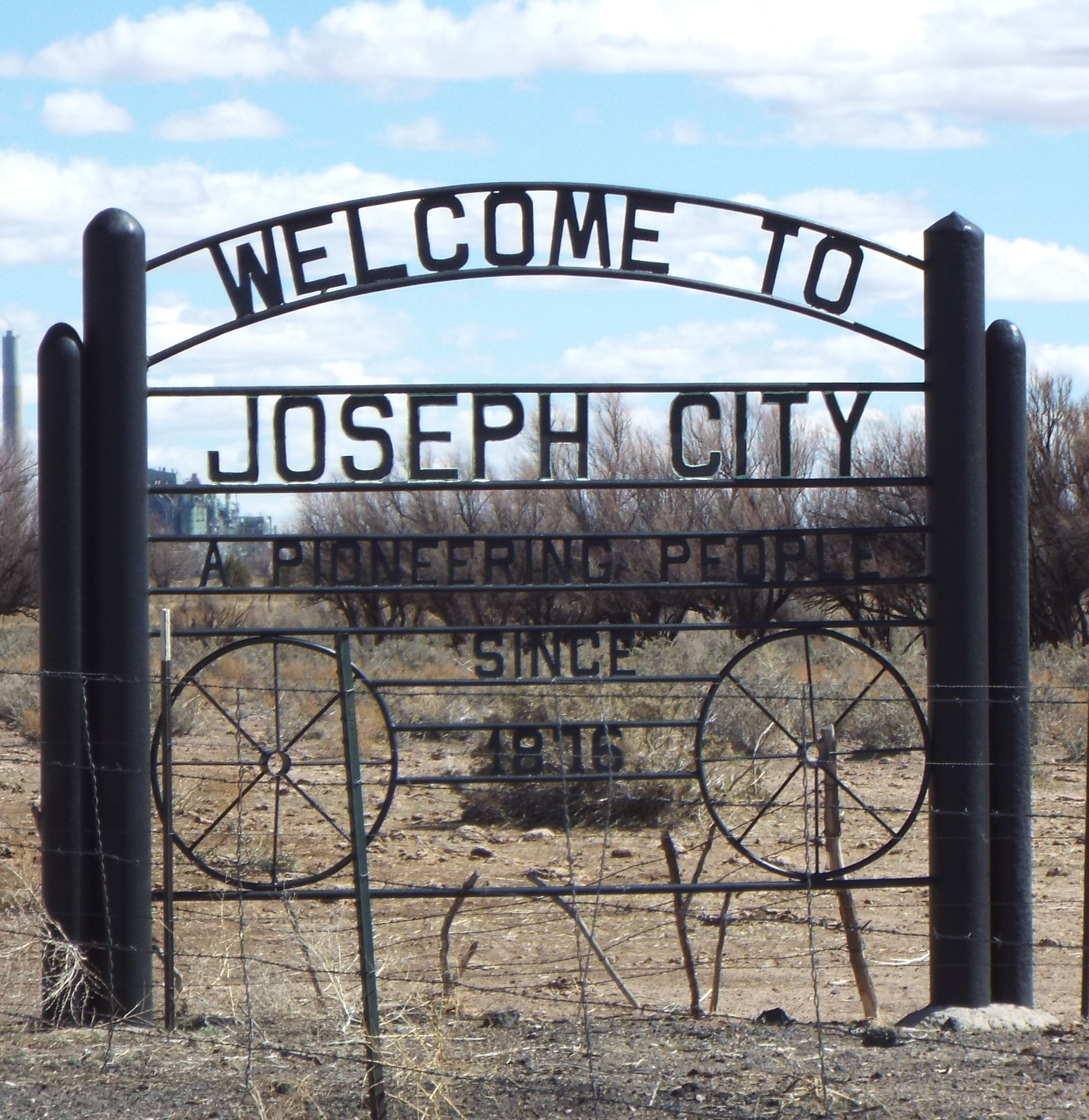

- Location in Navajo County and the state of Arizona

- Location in the United States
- Coordinates: 34°57′21″N 110°20′02″W
- Country: United States
- State: Arizona
- County: Navajo
- Settled: 1876

Area
  - Total: 7.41 sq mi (19.20 km^{2})
  - Land: 7.40 sq mi (19.17 km^{2})
  - Water: 0.015 sq mi (0.04 km^{2})
- Elevation: 5,043 ft (1,537 m)

Population (2020)
  - Total: 1,307
  - Density: 176.6/sq mi (68.19/km^{2})
- Time zone: UTC−7 (MST)
  - Summer (DST): UTC−7 (no DST/PDT)
- ZIP code: 86032
- Area code: 928
- FIPS code: 04-36430
- GNIS ID(s): 2582803

Joseph City (elevation 5,000 ft) is a census-designated place located in Navajo County, Arizona, United States. It is located on Interstate 40, approximately eighty miles east of Flagstaff and about thirty-five miles west of Petrified Forest National Park. In 2010, there were 1,386 inhabitants.

== History ==
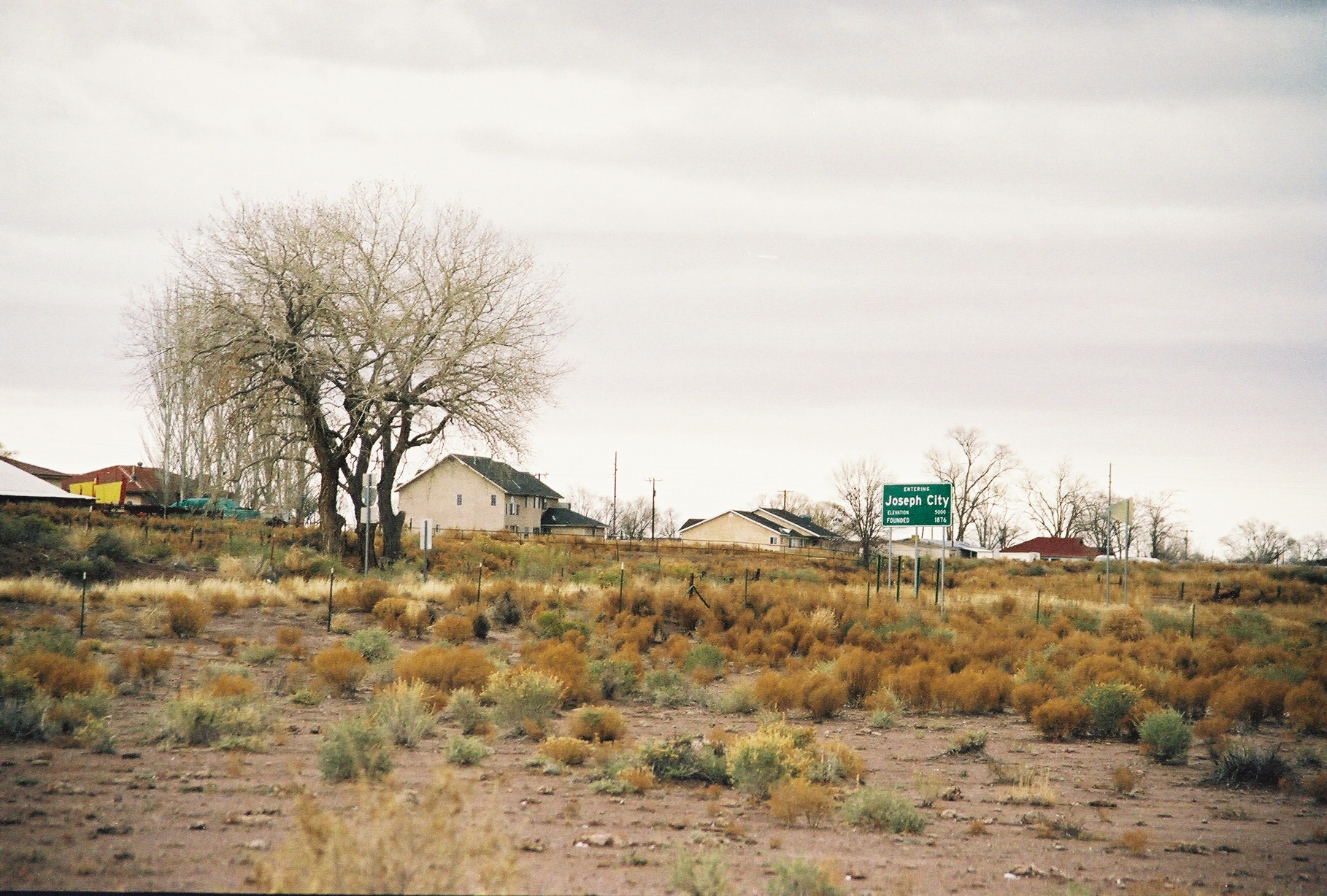
Joseph City in 2004

Joseph City was settled in 1876 by colonists who were members of the Church of Jesus Christ of Latter-day Saints. This band of 73 pioneers was led by Captain William C. Allen. They traveled to the Little Colorado River basin of Arizona. Joseph City was one of four Little Colorado River colonies. The other colonies were Brigham City, Sunset, and Obed. Joseph City is the only remaining colony.

The hardest challenge for the new colonists was trying to get water for their crops. This meant that they had to tame the Little Colorado River, which was difficult due to the flooding season that would destroy dams along the river. The first dam was built in 1876, shortly after the colonists arrived in the area. In the next 18 years the colonists built ten more dams. The eleventh dam was built in 1894. This dam lasted 29 years. In 1923, the eleventh dam was destroyed and the colonists were forced to build a new dam. This dam still stands and directs water to the inhabitants in the city.

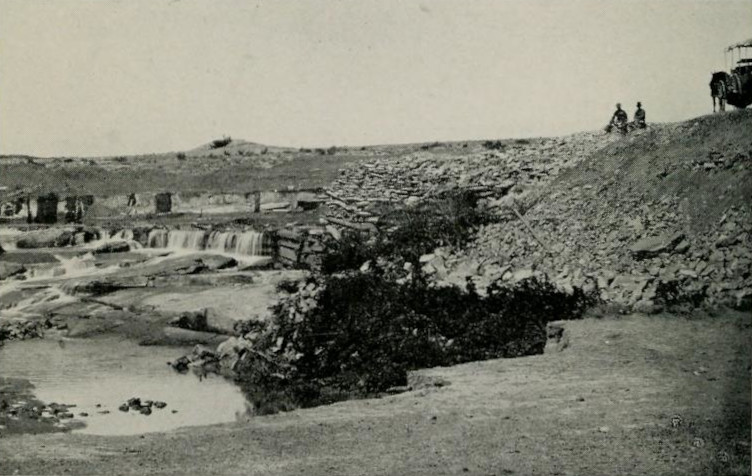
The 1894 dam on the Little Colorado River at St. Joseph

The name of the colony changed twice since its founding. The area settled by Captain Allen's group was called Allen's Camp, in honor of their leader. The name changed in January 1878 to St. Joseph. This change came about when the Little Colorado Stake was organized, to honor Joseph Smith, founder of the Latter Day Saint movement. In 1923 there was a final name change to Joseph City. Due to mail and freight shipment confusion, the Santa Fe Railway, which also ran through Saint Joseph, Missouri, asked St. Joseph, Arizona, to change its name. The residents of the town voted and the name became Joseph City.

== Geography ==
According to the United States Census Bureau, the city has a total area of 7.41 square miles (19.2 km^{2}), of which 7.4 square miles (19 km^{2}) is land and 0.01 square miles (0.026 km^{2}) is water.

=== Climate ===
Joseph City has a semi-arid climate (BSk) with cold to cool winters and hot summers. Although the mean snowfall is 0.16 metres (6.30 in), the median is zero, so the majority of winters do not have measurable snow.

Climate data for Joseph City, Arizona
Month	Jan	Feb	Mar	Apr	May	Jun	Jul	Aug	Sep	Oct	Nov	Dec	Year
Record high °F (°C)	74 (23)	99 (37)	89 (32)	93 (34)	101 (38)	108 (42)	106 (41)	109 (43)	106 (41)	96 (36)	89 (32)	78 (26)	109 (43)
Mean daily maximum °F (°C)	50.6 (10.3)	57.9 (14.4)	65.1 (18.4)	73.3 (22.9)	81.9 (27.7)	92.2 (33.4)	95.4 (35.2)	92.2 (33.4)	86.3 (30.2)	74.7 (23.7)	61.6 (16.4)	51.5 (10.8)	73.6 (23.1)
Mean daily minimum °F (°C)	20.9 (−6.2)	25.2 (−3.8)	30.3 (−0.9)	35.9 (2.2)	43.3 (6.3)	51.4 (10.8)	59.8 (15.4)	59.0 (15.0)	50.9 (10.5)	38.2 (3.4)	27.6 (−2.4)	20.9 (−6.2)	38.6 (3.7)
Record low °F (°C)	−20 (−29)	−19 (−28)	2 (−17)	10 (−12)	13 (−11)	30 (−1)	41 (5)	36 (2)	18 (−8)	15 (−9)	−10 (−23)	−21 (−29)	−21 (−29)
Average precipitation inches (mm)	0.71 (18)	0.66 (17)	0.72 (18)	0.37 (9.4)	0.38 (9.7)	0.20 (5.1)	1.17 (30)	1.51 (38)	1.18 (30)	1.07 (27)	0.66 (17)	0.57 (14)	9.2 (233.2)
Average snowfall inches (cm)	1.5 (3.8)	1.3 (3.3)	0.7 (1.8)	0.8 (2.0)	0 (0)	0 (0)	0 (0)	0 (0)	0 (0)	0 (0)	1.1 (2.8)	0.9 (2.3)	6.3 (16)
Average precipitation days (≥ 0.01 inch)	4.0	3.5	4.6	2.7	3.3	1.6	6.0	8.0	5.4	4.1	3.0	3.6	49.8
Average snowy days (≥ 0.1 inch)	0.8	0.7	0.6	0.1	0	0	0	0	0	0	0.6	0.6	3.4

== Demographics ==
Historical population
Census	Pop.	Note	%±
2010	1,386		—
2020	1,307		−5.7%
U.S. Decennial Census

=== 2020 census ===
As of the 2020 census, Joseph City had a population of 1,307. The median age was 37.1 years. 30.0% of residents were under the age of 18 and 19.0% of residents were 65 years of age or older. For every 100 females there were 88.1 males, and for every 100 females age 18 and over there were 88.7 males age 18 and over.

0.0% of residents lived in urban areas, while 100.0% lived in rural areas.

There were 438 households in Joseph City, of which 33.3% had children under the age of 18 living in them. Of all households, 53.7% were married-couple households, 18.9% were households with a male householder and no spouse or partner present, and 21.2% were households with a female householder and no spouse or partner present. About 24.4% of all households were made up of individuals and 10.7% had someone living alone who was 65 years of age or older.

There were 529 housing units, of which 17.2% were vacant. The homeowner vacancy rate was 1.5% and the rental vacancy rate was 13.3%.

Racial composition as of the 2020 census
Race	Number	Percent
White	957	73.2%
Black or African American	5	0.4%
American Indian and Alaska Native	251	19.2%
Asian	1	0.1%
Native Hawaiian and Other Pacific Islander	3	0.2%
Some other race	24	1.8%
Two or more races	66	5.0%
Hispanic or Latino (of any race)	113	8.6%

== Economy ==
The Cholla Power Plant is located near Joseph City.

== Education ==
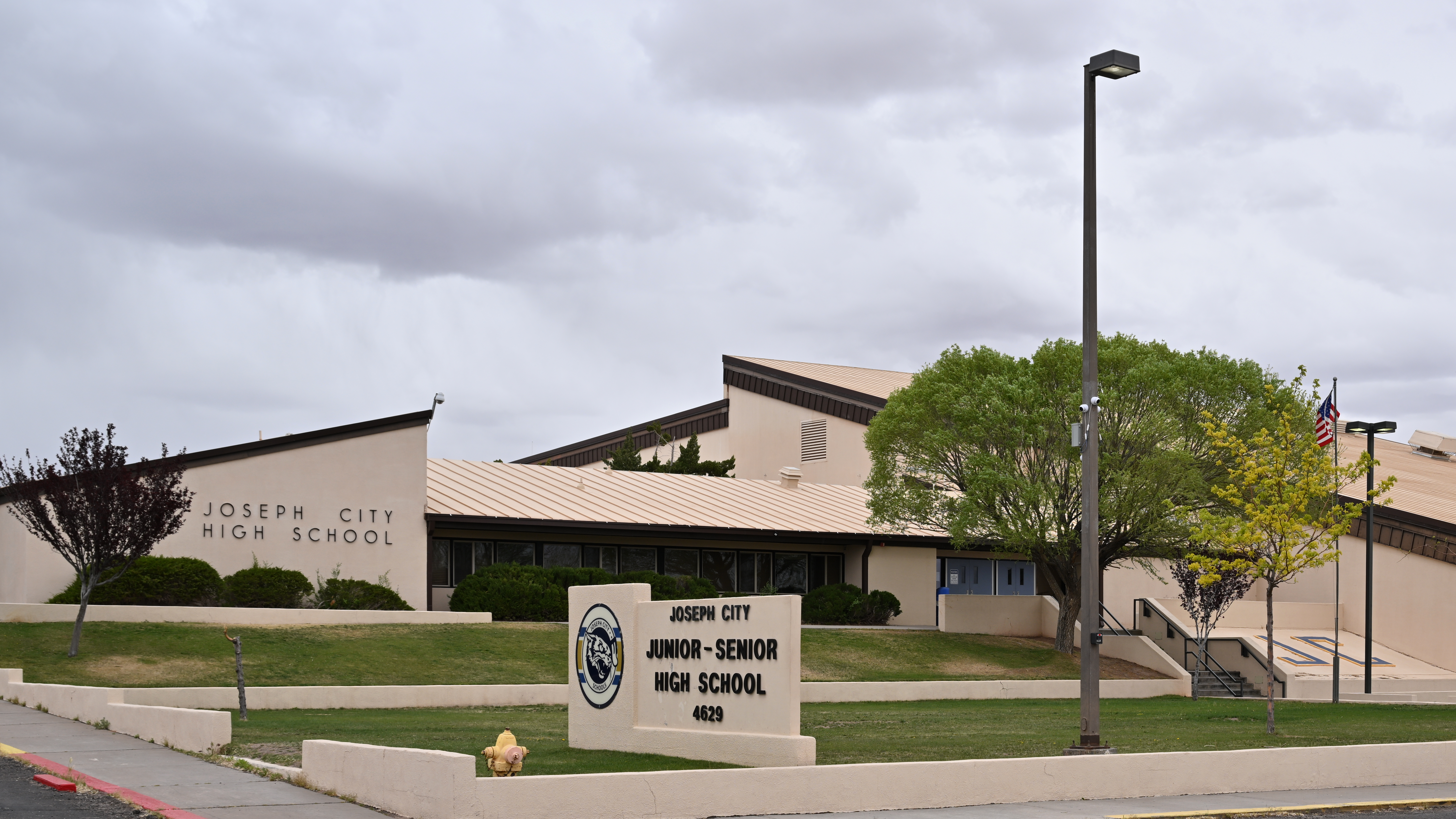
Front of Joseph City High School

Joseph City is served by the Joseph City Unified School District. Two schools, Joseph City Elementary School, and Joseph City High School, serve the community. Their schools have a very high AIMS standard. The current Superintendent of Joseph City Unified School District is Bryan Fields.

== See also ==
- Little Colorado River
- The Church of Jesus Christ of Latter-day Saints in Arizona
