= Central, Arizona =

CDP in Graham County, Arizona

- Census-designated place
- Location of Central in Graham County, Arizona.

- Location within Arizona Location within the United States
- Coordinates: 32°52′23″N 109°47′34″W
- Country: United States
- State: Arizona
- County: Graham

Area
  - Total: 1.68 sq mi (4.34 km^{2})
  - Land: 1.68 sq mi (4.34 km^{2})
  - Water: 0 sq mi (0.00 km^{2})
- Elevation: 2,881 ft (878 m)

Population (2020)
  - Total: 758
  - Density: 452.3/sq mi (174.62/km^{2})
- Time zone: UTC-7 (Mountain (MST))
- ZIP code: 85531
- Area code: 928
- GNIS feature ID: 2582751

Central is a census-designated place in Graham County, Arizona, United States. Its population was 758 as of the 2020 census. It is part of the Safford micropolitan area.

== Description ==
Central is located between the towns of Thatcher and Pima, all west of the Graham County seat, Safford. U.S. Route 70 is the main thoroughfare.

Central has a ZIP Code of 85531; according to the 2020–2024 American Community Survey 5-year estimates, ZIP Code Tabulation Area (ZCTA) 85531 had a population of 657.

== History ==
Central was first homesteaded by the Cluff family in 1880. The Cluffs extended the Central Canal to their lands on the eastern side of Central. Later settlers extended the canal west and north. In 1883, construction began on a one-room white rock building to be used as a church meeting house and school house. By 1884, twenty families, including Cluff, Norton, Shurtz, Bigler, and Webster households resided in Central. In 1978 the streets were named after these early Mormon pioneers. In December 1883, the Central Ward of the Church of Jesus Christ of Latter-day Saints was organized and Joseph Cluff was ordained the first bishop. A new red brick church was built in 1885. It was the first regular meeting house built in this part of Arizona and was also the first home of the LDS Academy from December 1890 to May 1891. A plaque east of Hwy 70 on Central Road commemorates the original home of the St. Joseph Stake Academy that later moved to Thatcher and became Eastern Arizona College.

In 1894, LDS Church historian Andrew Jensen reported on the Central Ward: "Thirty-five families or 178 souls, constitute the Mormon population, and there are only two other families in the district. Central excels in point of large orchards, extensive alfalfa fields and good grain. The meeting house is the only public building in the settlement, in which there is also a small store and a post office. There are a number of fine and comfortable private residences, built mostly of brick and adobe."

A railroad through Central was completed in 1896. The head of the Central Canal washed out in 1905. Since then, the Smithville and Union Canals have been used exclusively.

Central's population was estimated as 100 in the 1960 census.

The Gila Valley Arizona Temple of The Church of Jesus Christ of Latter-day Saints, opened in 2010, is located in Central. The temple is the third LDS temple built in Arizona and the first temple announced by Thomas S. Monson after being sustained as President of the Church in 2008. Monson dedicated the temple on May 23, 2010.

== Geography ==
From its location just south of the Gila River within the Upper Gila Valley, Mount Graham of the Pinaleño Mountains dominates the southern skyline.

== Demographics ==
Historical population
Census	Pop.	Note	%±
1960	100		—
2020	758		—
U.S. Decennial Census

== Notable people ==
- Jack Elam 1920–2003, an actor in 119 movies and 260 television appearances was briefly a resident of Central as a child.
- Dale Smith 1928–2017, grew up in Central. Dale is a 1995 inductee of the Rodeo Hall of Fame of the National Cowboy and Western Heritage Museum. He is a 1979 inductee of the ProRodeo Hall of Fame.
- James Martin Smith 1892–1970, local rancher, farmer, church leader, and politician, was a Democratic party candidate for Arizona governor and owner of the Arizona Journal newspaper.

== See also ==
- List of census-designated places in Arizona
