= Sunset, Arizona =

- Populated place
- Location within Arizona Location within the United States
- Coordinates: 35°02′40″N 110°39′12″W
- Country: United States
- State: Arizona
- County: Navajo
- Founded: 1876
- Abandoned: 1887
- Founder: Lot Smith and Company
- Elevation: 4,895 ft (1,492 m)
- Time zone: UTC-7 (MST (no DST))

Sunset is a populated place and former town in Navajo County, Arizona, United States, located approximately four miles north-west of Winslow. It was settled in 1876 by a group of members of the Church of Jesus Christ of Latter-day Saints under the direction of Lot Smith. Drought and flash flooding that washed away the dams and irrigation systems led to crop failures. It ceased being a town by 1884 and the last settlers moved out in 1888. The channel of the Little Colorado River now runs where the town site used to be. Only the small hilltop Sunset Cemetery remains and is part of the Homolovi State Park.

Sunset was one of four Little Colorado River colonies. The other colonies were Joseph City, Brigham City, and Obed. Joseph City is the only remaining colony.

== See also ==
- The Church of Jesus Christ of Latter-day Saints in Arizona
