= Brigham City, Arizona =

Ghost town in Navajo County

Brigham City
- Ghost town
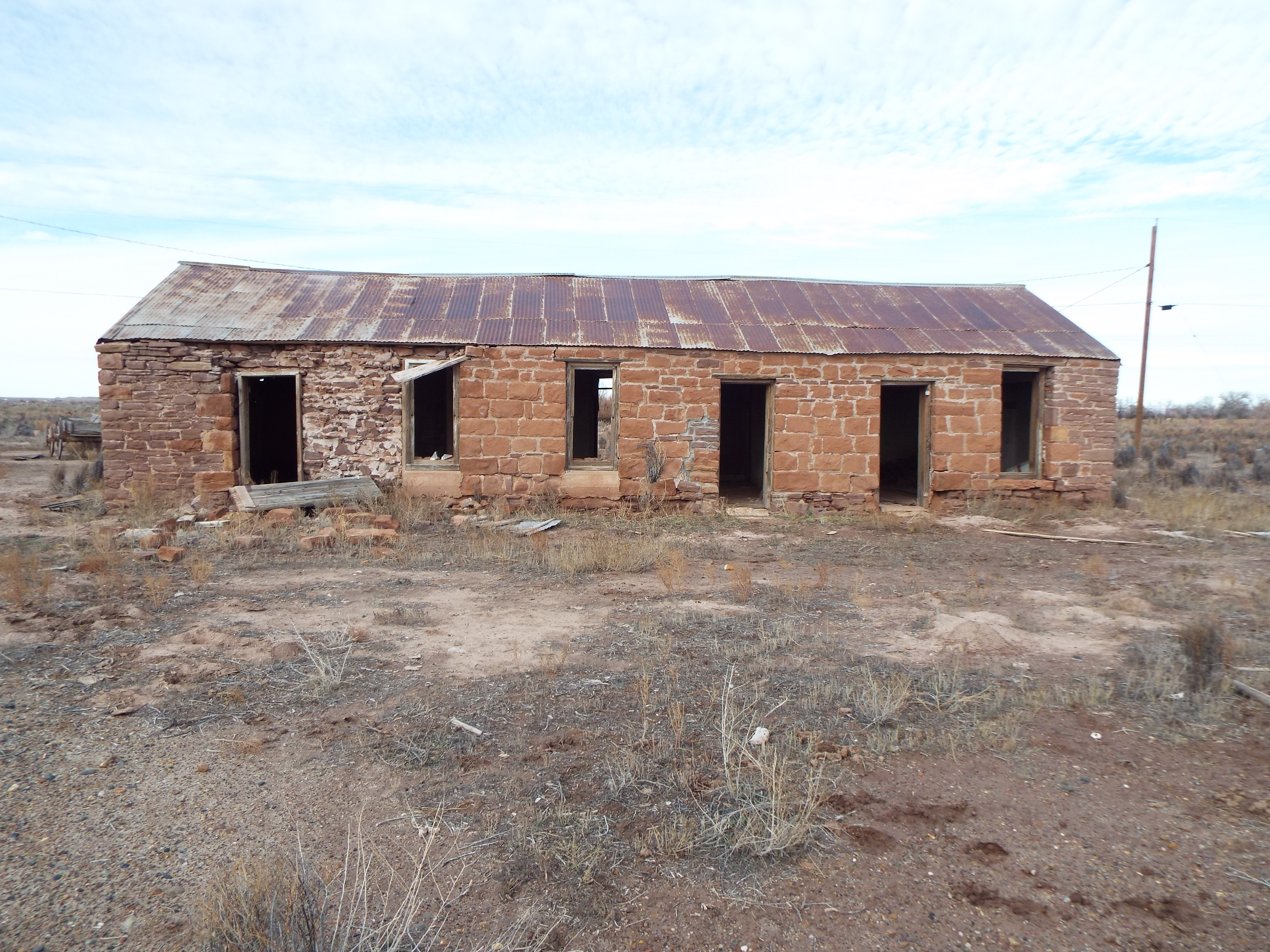

- Location within Arizona
- Coordinates: 35°02′31″N 110°41′04″W
- Country: United States
- State: Arizona
- County: Navajo
- Founded: 1876
- Abandoned: 1881
- Named for: Brigham Young
- Elevation: 4,895 ft (1,492 m)
- Time zone: UTC-7 (MST (no DST))
- Brigham City
- U.S. National Register of Historic Places
- Location within Arizona Location within the United States
- Nearest city: Winslow, Arizona
- Area: 160 acres (65 ha)
- Built: 1876
- NRHP reference No.: 78000558
- Added to NRHP: June 9, 1978

Brigham City is a ghost town in Navajo County, Arizona, United States. Founded by member of the Church of Jesus Christ of Latter-day Saints near the present city of Winslow in 1876, it was one and one-half miles north of Winslow's current city center, along the Little Colorado River. It was organized as a Latter-Day Saints ward in 1878, but by 1881 it had been abandoned.

Twenty Mormon families and fifteen bachelors from Salt Lake City settled the area, and built homes inside protective walls originally measuring 200 feet (61 m) long and 7 feet (2.1 m) high. Flash flooding that washed away the dams and irrigation systems led to crop failures and caused the abandonment of the town by 1881.

The US Census listed its population as 191 in 1880.

Brigham City was one of four Little Colorado River colonies. The other colonies were Joseph City, Sunset, and Obed. Joseph City is the only remaining colony.

Brigham City was added to the National Register of Historic Places as of June 9, 1978, and the remnants are currently undergoing restoration. Only one of the communities' buildings and portions of the encircling wall remain.

Archaeological excavations have been carried out at the location of the grist mill, the pottery, and other features

== Demographics ==
Brigham City appeared in the U.S. Census in 1880, with a population of 191. The original townsite has since been annexed into the city of Winslow and is now a historic site.

== See also ==
- The Church of Jesus Christ of Latter-day Saints in Arizona
- Images of historic Brigham City
