= Snowflake Arizona Temple =

LDS Church in Navajo County, Arizona

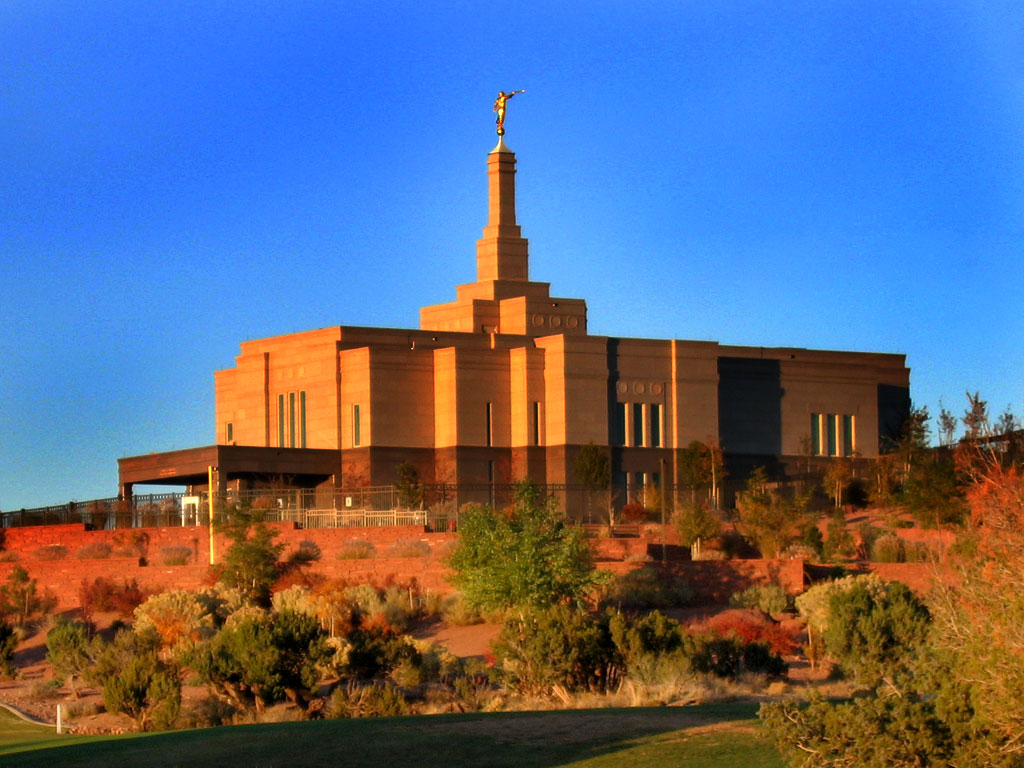
- Interactive map of Snowflake Arizona Temple
- Number: 108
- Dedication: March 3, 2002, by Gordon B. Hinckley
- Site: 7.5 acres (3.0 ha)
- Floor area: 18,621 ft^{2} (1,729.9 m^{2})
- Height: 60 ft (18 m)
- Official website • News & images

Church chronology
← Columbia River Washington Temple	Snowflake Arizona Temple	→ Lubbock Texas Temple

Additional information
- Announced: April 2, 2000, by Gordon B. Hinckley
- Groundbreaking: September 23, 2000, by Rex D. Pinegar
- Open house: February 2–16, 2002
- Current president: Richard Quentin Miller
- Designed by: Trest Polina
- Location: Snowflake, Arizona, U.S.
- Coordinates: 34°30′8.2″N 110°6′40.8″W
- Exterior finish: Two tones of polished granite, Empress White and Majestic Grey, quarried in China
- Design: Classic modern, single-spire design
- Baptistries: 1
- Ordinance rooms: 2 (two-stage progressive)
- Sealing rooms: 2

The Snowflake Arizona Temple is the 108th operating temple of the Church of Jesus Christ of Latter-day Saints. The intent to build the temple was announced on April 2, 2000, by church president Gordon B. Hinckley, during general conference. The temple is the second in Arizona.

The temple has a single attached spire with a statue of the angel Moroni. This temple was designed by Trest Polina of Fanning Bard Tatum Architects of Albuquerque, New Mexico. A groundbreaking ceremony, to signify the beginning of construction, was held on September 23, 2000, conducted by Rex D. Pinegar, a church general authority.

== History ==
Mormon pioneers first settled Snowflake, Arizona in 1878 at the request of church president Brigham Young. The town of Snowflake was named after William J. Flake and Erastus Snow, two of the church's early leaders who helped supervise colonization of the area.

Construction of the temple was announced by Gordon B. Hinckley on April 2, 2000. It is set on a knoll that has become known as "Temple Hill." About eight feet was removed from the top of the knoll so the two-level temple could be built. The lower level is partially set into the knoll. The groundbreaking ceremony took place on September 23, 2000, marking the commencement of construction. The ceremony was presided over by Rex D. Pinegar, a General Authority Seventy, and attended by local church members and community leaders. On January 12, 2002, the church announced that the temple would be open to the public during an open house from February 2-16, 2002 (excluding Sundays). During the open house, 94,416 people visited the temple. Church president Gordon B. Hinckley dedicated the Snowflake Arizona Temple in four sessions on March 3, 2002.

== Design and architecture ==
The building’s architecture is inspired by pioneer and Native American and traditional Latter-day Saint temple design. Designed by Trest Polina of Fanning Bard Tatum Architects, its architecture reflects both the cultural heritage of the Snowflake region and its spiritual significance to the church.

The temple is on a 7.5-acre plot, and surrounding landscaping includes a water feature and plant life that compliments the natural surroundings. These elements are designed to provide a tranquil setting that enhances the sacred atmosphere of the site.

The structure stands two stories tall, constructed with two tones of imported polished Chinese granite. The exterior has resemblance to the Winter Quarters Nebraska Temple.

To reflect the history and culture of the area, the interior features design motifs drawn from pioneer quilt blocks and Native American designs, which appear in decorative painting and carpet throughout the temple. Also on display inside is a hand-painted mural by Native American artist, Linda Turley-Christensen, and other handcrafted artworks by local Native American artists. There is also as a stained-glass triptych which was “previously located in a building owned by another church…on the U.S. eastern seaboard.”

The temple includes two ordinance rooms, two sealing rooms, and a baptistry.

The design uses symbolic elements representing the heritage of the Snowflake area, to provide deeper spiritual meaning to its appearance and function. Symbolism is important to church members and includes rugs, woven baskets, and pottery created by local Native American artists.

== Temple presidents ==
The church's temples are directed by a temple president and matron, each serving for a term of three years. The president and matron oversee the administration of temple operations and provide guidance and training for both temple patrons and staff.

Serving from 2002 to 2005, the first president of the Snowflake Arizona Temple was Leon T. Ballard, with Flora M. Ballard serving as matron. As of 2024, Richard Q. Miller is the president, with Linda L. Miller being the matron.

== Admittance ==
Following the completion of the temple, the church held a public open house from February 2 to 16, 2002 (excluding Sundays). The temple was dedicated by Gordon B. Hinckley on March 3, 2002, in four sessions.

Like all the church's temples, it is not used for Sunday worship services. To members of the church, temples are regarded as sacred houses of the Lord. Once dedicated, only church members with a current temple recommend can enter for worship..

== See also ==
Temples in Arizona ()
- = Operating
- = Under construction
- = Announced
- = Temporarily Closed

- Comparison of temples of The Church of Jesus Christ of Latter-day Saints
- List of temples of The Church of Jesus Christ of Latter-day Saints
- List of temples of The Church of Jesus Christ of Latter-day Saints by geographic region
- Temple architecture (Latter-day Saints)
- The Church of Jesus Christ of Latter-day Saints in Arizona
