= Gila Valley Arizona Temple =

LDS Church temple in Graham County, Arizona

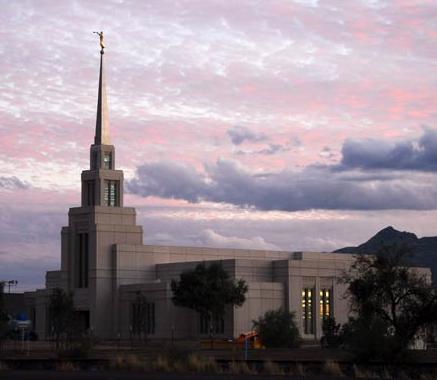
- Exterior, December 2009
- Interactive map of Gila Valley Arizona Temple
- Number: 132
- Dedication: May 23, 2010, by Thomas S. Monson
- Site: 17 acres (6.9 ha)
- Floor area: 18,561 ft^{2} (1,724.4 m^{2})
- Height: 100 ft (30 m)
- Official website • News & images

Church chronology
← Vancouver British Columbia Temple	Gila Valley Arizona Temple	→ Cebu City Philippines Temple

Additional information
- Announced: April 26, 2008, by Thomas S. Monson
- Groundbreaking: February 14, 2009, by Neil L. Andersen
- Open house: April 23 – May 15, 2010
- Current president: Brian J. Kartchner
- Designed by: Gregory B. Lambright
- Location: Central, Arizona, United States
- Coordinates: 32°51′48″N 109°47′23″W
- Exterior finish: Architectural precast stone
- Baptistries: 1
- Ordinance rooms: 2 (two-stage progressive)
- Sealing rooms: 2

The Gila Valley Arizona Temple is a temple of the Church of Jesus Christ of Latter-day Saints (LDS Church) in the Arizona town of Central, between the communities of Pima and Thatcher. The intent to build the temple was announced in a press release on April 26, 2008, by the church's First Presidency. The temple is the third in Arizona.

The temple has a single attached end spire with a statue of the angel Moroni. This temple was crafted by the architectural firm Architectural Nexus. A groundbreaking ceremony, to signify the beginning of construction, was held on February 14, 2009, conducted by Neil L. Andersen.

== History ==
Plans to build the temple announced on April 26, 2008, was done concurrently with the Gilbert Arizona Temple. These were the first temples announced after Thomas S. Monson became the LDS Church's president.

Local church leadership announced on September 21, 2008, that the temple would be built on church-owned property adjacent to U.S. Route 70 in the unincorporated community of Central. A petition to grant an exception to building height restrictions to accommodate a 100-foot-tall (30 m) steeple for the temple was given a favorable recommendation by the Graham County Planning and Zoning Commission and was subsequently approved by the county board of supervisors on October 20.

A groundbreaking and site dedication ceremony took place on February 14, 2009, officially beginning the construction process. The structure was completed on September 22 with the placement of the angel Moroni statue on its steeple. Additional site improvements, including landscaping and interior work, were completed in early 2010.

On December 13, 2009, the church announced the public open house that was held from April 23 to May 15, 2010, excluding Sundays. During the open house, more than 90,000 people visited the temple.

On May 22, 2010, the day before the temple’s dedication, over 1,600 area youth participated in a cultural celebration depicting the church's history in Arizona. More than 3,500 people attended the celebration, including Thomas S. Monson.

The temple was dedicated by Monson on May 23, 2010, in three sessions. During remarks before the dedicatory prayer, Monson noted that an anonymous benefactor, a woman from the area, had given $500,000 to allow the temple to be adorned with much original artwork.

At the time, the new temple served the significant Latter-day Saint population in the eastern part of Arizona's Gila River Valley, who previously had to travel to the Mesa Arizona Temple, 150 miles to the west. The area has a historical significance to the LDS Church; Thatcher, which was founded by Mormon pioneers in 1881, was home to former LDS Church president Spencer W. Kimball during his youth in the early part of the 1900s. Speculation that the area would be home to a temple was made as early as 1882, when Jesse N. Smith predicted that a temple would be built in Thatcher.

In 2020, like all the church's others, the Gila Valley Arizona Temple was closed for a time in response to the COVID-19 pandemic.

== Design and architecture ==
The building has a traditional Latter-day Saint temple design. Designed by Architectural Nexus, its architecture reflects both the cultural heritage of the Gila Valley region and its spiritual significance to the church.

The temple is on a 17-acre plot, with surrounding landscaping of trees and shrubs. The structure stands 104 feet tall, constructed with precast concrete. The exterior has art-glass windows.

The interior has “art-glass windows and murals of local river, desert and mountain landscapes.” The temple includes two sealing rooms, two ordinance rooms, and a baptistry, each designed for ceremonial use.

The design has elements representing Latter-day Saint symbolism, to provide deeper spiritual meaning to its appearance and function. Symbolism is important to church members and include the angel Moroni statue on top of the temple to represent “the restoration of the gospel of Jesus Christ.”

== Temple presidents ==
The church's temples are directed by a temple president and matron, each typically serving for a term of three years. The president and matron oversee the administration of temple operations and provide guidance and training for both temple patrons and staff.

Serving from 2010 to 2012, Keith Crockett was the first president, with Kathleen M. Crockett as matron. As of 2025, Brian J. Kartchner is the president, with Lynda G. Kartchner serving as matron.

== Admittance ==
On December 13, 2009, the church announced the public open house that was held from April 23 to May 15, 2010 (excluding Sundays). The temple was dedicated by Thomas S. Monson on May 23, 2010, in three sessions.

Like all the church's temples, it is not used for Sunday worship services. To members of the church, temples are regarded as sacred houses of the Lord. Once dedicated, only church members with a current temple recommend can enter for worship.

== See also ==
Temples in Arizona ()
- = Operating
- = Under construction
- = Announced
- = Temporarily Closed

- Comparison of temples of The Church of Jesus Christ of Latter-day Saints
- List of temples of The Church of Jesus Christ of Latter-day Saints
- List of temples of The Church of Jesus Christ of Latter-day Saints by geographic region
- Temple architecture (Latter-day Saints)
- The Church of Jesus Christ of Latter-day Saints in Arizona
