= Gilbert Arizona Temple =

LDS Church temple in Arizona

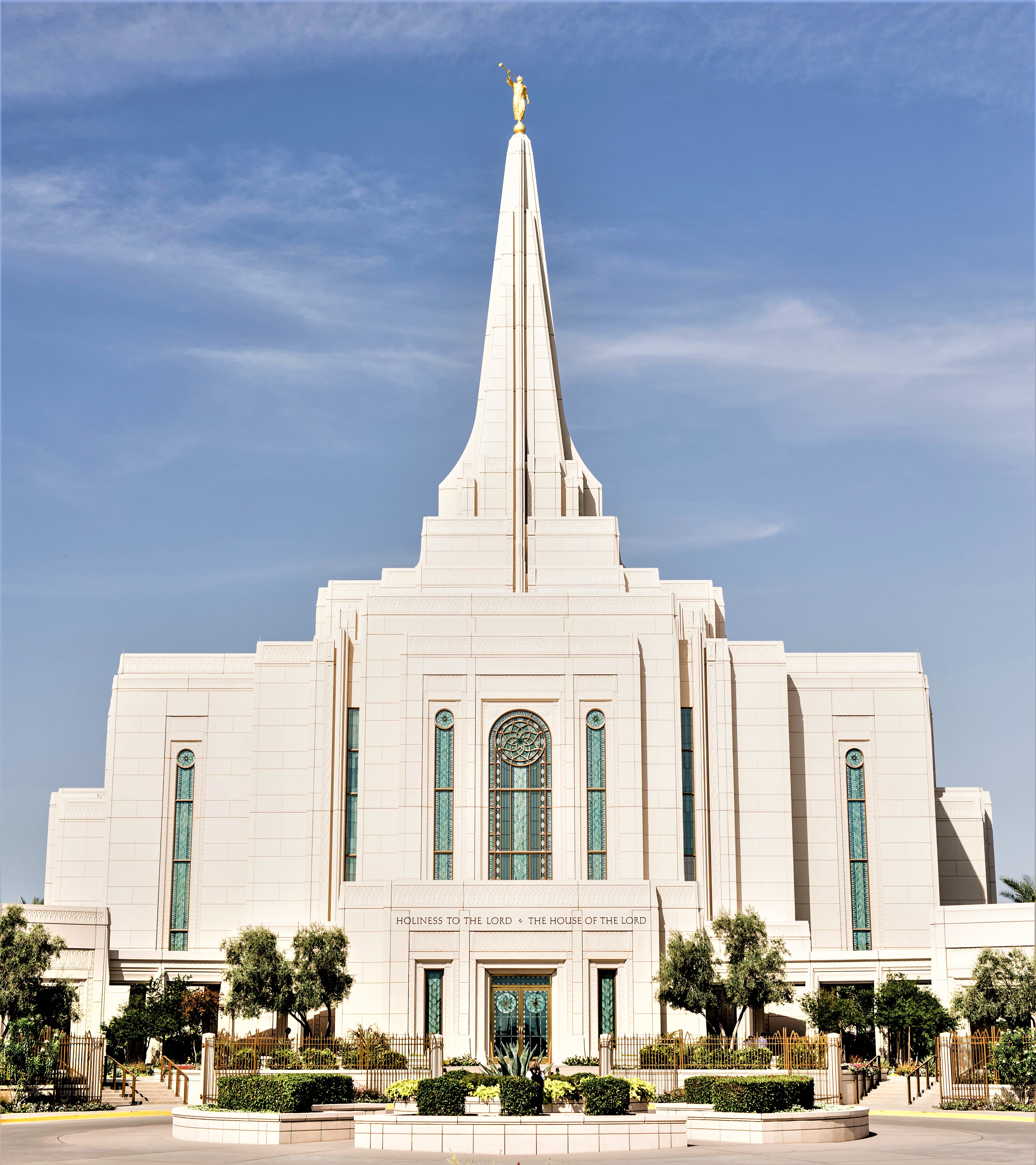
- (2021)
- Interactive map of Gilbert Arizona Temple
- Number: 142
- Dedication: March 2, 2014, by Henry B. Eyring & Thomas S. Monson
- Site: 15.38 acres (6.22 ha)
- Floor area: 85,326 ft^{2} (7,927.0 m^{2})
- Height: 195 ft (59 m)
- Official website • News & images

Church chronology
← Tegucigalpa Honduras Temple	Gilbert Arizona Temple	→ Fort Lauderdale Florida Temple

Additional information
- Announced: April 26, 2008, by Thomas S. Monson
- Groundbreaking: November 13, 2010, by Claudio R. M. Costa
- Open house: January 18, 2014 – February 15, 2014
- Current president: Leonard Greer
- Location: Gilbert, Arizona, U.S.
- Coordinates: 33°17′29.0″N 111°44′14.5″W
- Design: Neoclassical center spire
- Baptistries: 1
- Ordinance rooms: 3 (stationary)
- Sealing rooms: 7
- Clothing rental: Yes
- Notes: Announced by Thomas S. Monson on April 26, 2008, to be built on the southeast corner of Pecos and Greenfield Roads. A public open house was held from January 18 to February 15, 2014. The temple was formally dedicated on March 2, 2014.

The Gilbert Arizona Temple is a temple of the Church of Jesus Christ of Latter-day Saints, located at 3301 South Greenfield Road, at the corner of East Pecos Road in Gilbert, Arizona. The intent to build the temple was announced on April 26, 2008, by church president Thomas S. Monson in a press release. A groundbreaking ceremony, to signify the beginning of construction, was held in 2010. The temple was designed by the architectural firm Architekton. The temple was dedicated in 2014.

== History ==
The April 26, 2008, announcement of the temple's planned construction was made along with the Gila Valley Arizona Temple, the first new temples announced after Thomas S. Monson became the church's president. It is the fourth built in Arizona, and the church's 142nd operating temple.

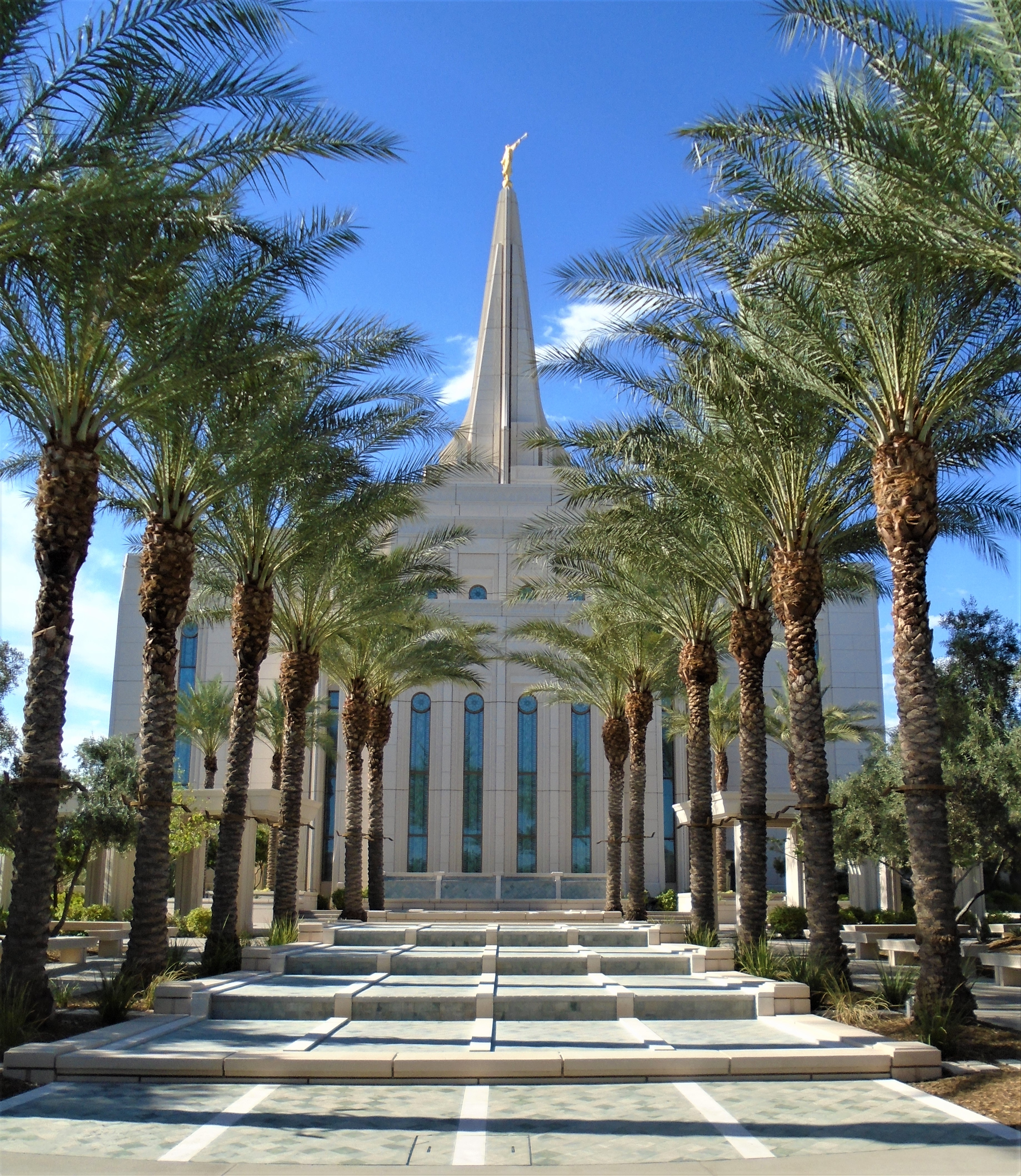
The approach to the temple from the south

The temple is near the intersection of Pecos and Greenfield roads in the southeast Phoenix metropolitan area. It was built due to increasing church members in the area and to help ease the load on the nearby Mesa Arizona Temple.

The Gilbert town council gave unanimous approval to the requested zoning changes in a meeting on September 29, 2009. Key among the requests was an allowance to build to a height of 85 feet, higher than the existing restriction of 45 feet. The temple's planned 180-foot-tall (55 m) steeple did not require an exemption, as the town does not restrict the height of steeples. While not providing a specific timeframe for construction, an anticipated completion within three years was repeated at the meeting.

The temple is on 15.4 acres of land, bounded by Greenfield and Pecos Roads and Somerset and Granview Boulevards. It stands at 195 feet tall with the addition of an angel Moroni statue put in place on May 15, 2012, and is 85,326 square feet. The building's exterior is completed with light cream colored precast concrete with white quartz. The interior is decorated in blues, greens, and earth tones on the walls and stained glass windows with the same scheme. Some limestone completes the beauty of the temple along with eucalyptus wood, white oak, and painted hardwoods.

Claudio R. M. Costa presided at a groundbreaking ceremony on November 13, 2010, with completion of the temple expected to take approximately two years. The design of the temple was overseen by Gregory B. Lambright of Architekton. During construction, a trailer at the site served as a visitors' center, greeting guests and answering questions. A public open house was held from January 18 to February 15, 2014. The temple was dedicated on March 2, 2014, by Henry B. Eyring and Monson. Like all temples built by the church, the temple in Gilbert was built and dedicated as a "refuge from the storms of life and the noise of the world" for church members.

In 2020, like all the church's others, the temple was closed for a time in response to the COVID-19 pandemic.

== Design and architecture ==
The building uses a traditional Latter-day Saint temple design. The landscaping around the temple has fountains, plazas, trellises, arbors, and pergolas.

The temple includes a baptistry, three instruction rooms, and seven sealing rooms.

The design has elements representing Latter-day Saint symbolism, to provide deeper spiritual meaning to its appearance and function. Symbolism is important to church members. These symbols include interlinked agave leaves, representing the "eternal nature of marriage and family."

A cultural celebration was held at the Discovery Park, kitty-corner to the temple, to commemorate the temple’s dedication. Twelve thousand church members participated in the celebration, which featured stories from the Old Testament (Hebrew Bible), the Book of Mormon, and church history.

== Temple presidents ==
The church's temples are directed by a temple president and matron, each serving for a term of three years. The president and matron oversee the administration of temple operations and provide guidance and training for both temple patrons and staff.

The temple's first president was David E. LeSueur, with Nancy L. LeSueur serving as matron. As of 2025, the president is Terry D. Turk, with Janet Turk serving as matron.

== Admittance ==
On October 26, 2013, the church announced that a public open house would be held from January 18-February 15, 2014 (excluding Sundays). The temple was dedicated by Eyring and Monson in three sessions on March 2, 2014. Like all the church's temples, it is not used for Sunday worship services. To members of the church, temples are regarded as sacred houses of God. Once dedicated, only church members with a current temple recommend can enter for worship.

== See also ==
Temples in Arizona ()
- = Operating
- = Under construction
- = Announced
- = Temporarily Closed

- Comparison of temples (LDS Church)
- List of temples (LDS Church)
- List of temples by geographic region (LDS Church)
- Temple architecture (LDS Church)
- The Church of Jesus Christ of Latter-day Saints in Arizona
