= List of historic properties in Snowflake, Arizona =

- Town
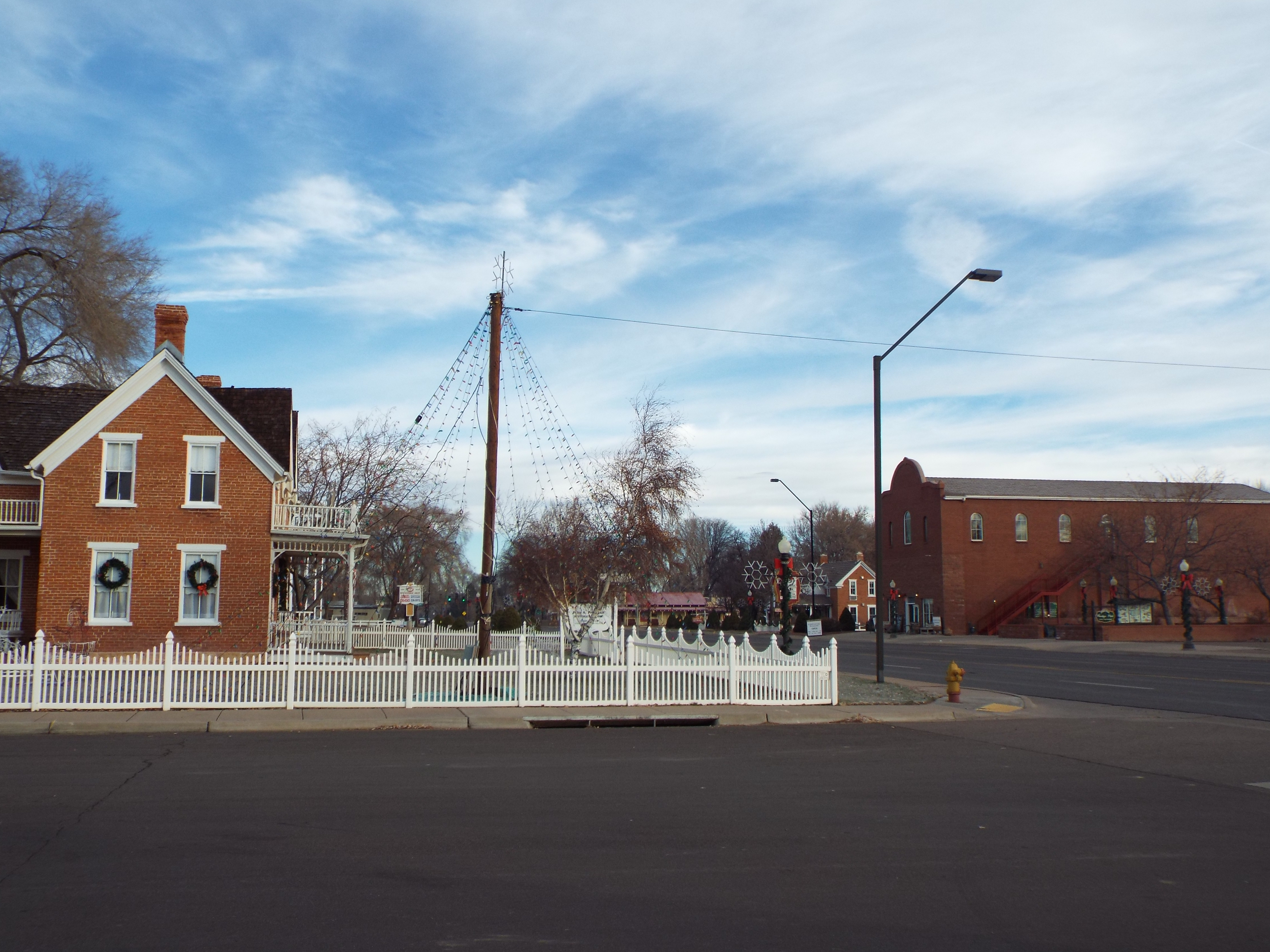
- Snowflake Townsite Historic District

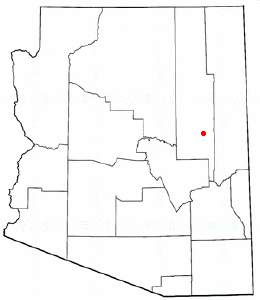
- Map of Snowflake in the Navajo County of the state of Arizona

This is a list which includes a photographic gallery, of historic structures in Snowflake, a town in Navajo County, Arizona, United States. Snowflake was founded in 1878, and incorporated in 1917. Some of the structures of historical significance are individually listed in the National Register of Historic Places. Snowflake has a historical district known as the Snowflake Townsite Historic District. The district is Roughly bounded by 3rd Street North, Stinson, 2nd Street South, and Hulet Street.

== Brief history ==
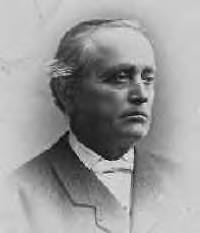
Erastus Snow

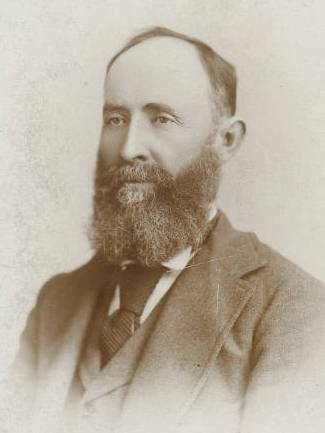
William Jordan Flake

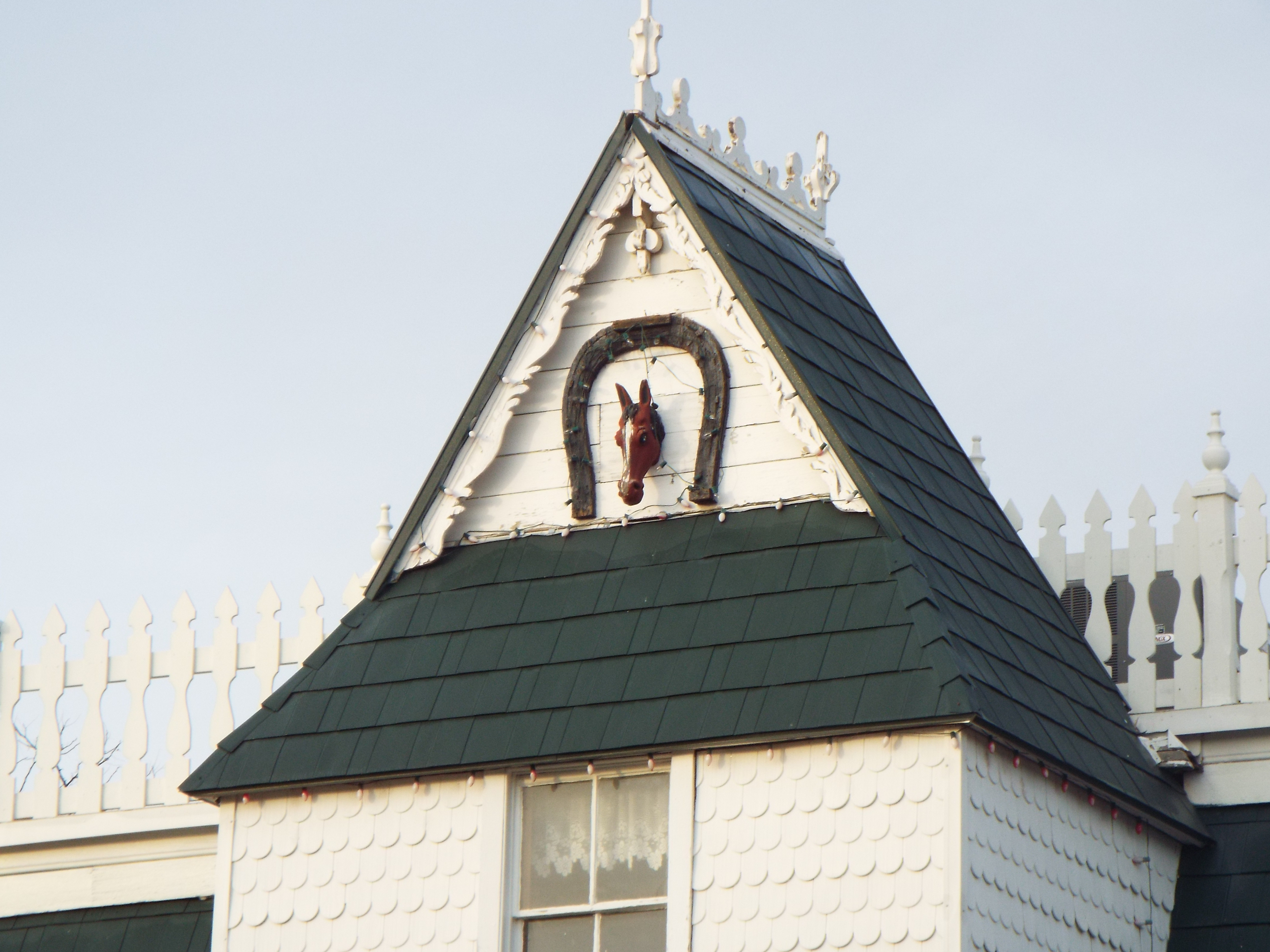
The James M. Flake House

The town of Snowflake is located by the White Mountains of Arizona. The Mogollon, Sinagua, Anasazi and Hohokam Tribes were the primary inhabitants of the region from 1100 to 1400 A.D. The area is home to the White Mountain and San Carlos Apache Tribes.

James Pearce was appointed by Erastus Snow, a Mormon Apostle, to begin the colonization process of the Silver Creek Valley in Arizona. During his journey he stopped at James Stinson's Ranch. Stinson was developing his land and according to Pearce, he asked for too much money and therefore Pearce moved three miles further down and set up a camp. Many families moved to the area where the camp was established and the community of Taylor was founded.

== The founding of Snowflake ==
In 1877, the LDS Church President Brigham Young asked William Jordan Flake, to start a settlement in the northern area of what was then the Arizona Territory. Flake and his family joined a wagon train which was headed for the Little Colorado River region of Arizona. After he arrived there, he was confronted with many hardships and began looking for a new place to live. He met James Stinson and was able to negotiate a price for the ranch which Stinson wanted to sell. Flake returned to Utah to seek the counsel and blessings of Erastus Snow. Snow gave Flake his advice and suggested that Flake divide the Stinson Ranch into city lots and first- and second-class farm plots. There were twenty blocks in the original townsite each containing 4 lots. The townsite was named Snowflake in honor of Erastus Snow and William Flake.

The residential areas of the town grew as settlers moved into Snowflake. The majority of the homes in the Snowflake Townsite Historic District were built of logs or adobe during this period. Skilled artisans were sent by The Church of Jesus Christ of Latter-day Saints in Utah to help with the settlers of new colonies. They taught their skills to the pioneers. Ralph Ramsay carved a horse's head and a large horseshoe in the middle of the third-story gable of the three-story house to adorn the home which he built for James Madison Flake. The first LDS church in Snowflake was the Stinson/Flake Ranch house which is actually the oldest house in Snowflake.

In 1884, the officials of the territorial government used a federal law against polygamy to bring charges against some of the Mormon leaders. William J. Flake was among the accused and he was sent to the territorial prison in Yuma for six months. Fearing further prosecutions other Mormon leaders with plural wives fled the territory, some returning to Utah.

Hard economic times fell upon Snowflake during this period, however, the church in Utah lend them a helping hand. Wilford Woodruff, President of The Church of Jesus Christ of Latter-day Saints and President of the Board of Education for the Church, believed that Snowflake should establish an academy for higher education. He wrote to the LDS Church leadership in regard to his thoughts. The Stake Board of Education in Snowflake approved the construction of the Stake Academy. The original Stake Academy building burned down in 1911 and was replaced by the current structure built in 1911.

Erastus Snow had recently appointed Jessie Nathaniel Smith to the presidency of the newly created Eastern Arizona Stake of Zion. Together with his son-in-law, John Riley Hulet and family, he moved to Snowflake in 1879. Hulet was one of the founders of the Snowflake Cooperative Store and the Arizona Cooperative Mercantile Institution. He became Snowflake's postmaster in 1883.

William Jordan Flake died on August 10, 1932, in Snowflake. He was survived by 11 sons and nine daughters. Erastus Snow died on May 27, 1888, in Salt Lake City, Utah Territory. He was buried at Salt Lake City Cemetery.

Though the Stinson/Flake Ranch House is the oldest house of the original Snowflake townsite, it is not the oldest structure there. The c. 1858, primitive cabin where William Jordan Flake once lived was relocated from Beaver, Utah, by the Flake families and is now located within the property of the house of James Madison Flake and family.

== Snowflake Townsite Historic District ==
The Snowflake Townsite Historic District is roughly bounded by 3rd Street North, Stinson, 2nd Street South, and Hulet Street. The area consists of the 20 block area of the original townsite. The district contains residential and commercial buildings of various styles reflecting the historic appearance and development patterns prevalent in Snowflake and other Mormon-settled towns of the region. The district was listed in the National Register of Historic Places March 20, 1998, reference #98000261.

== Stinson Museum ==
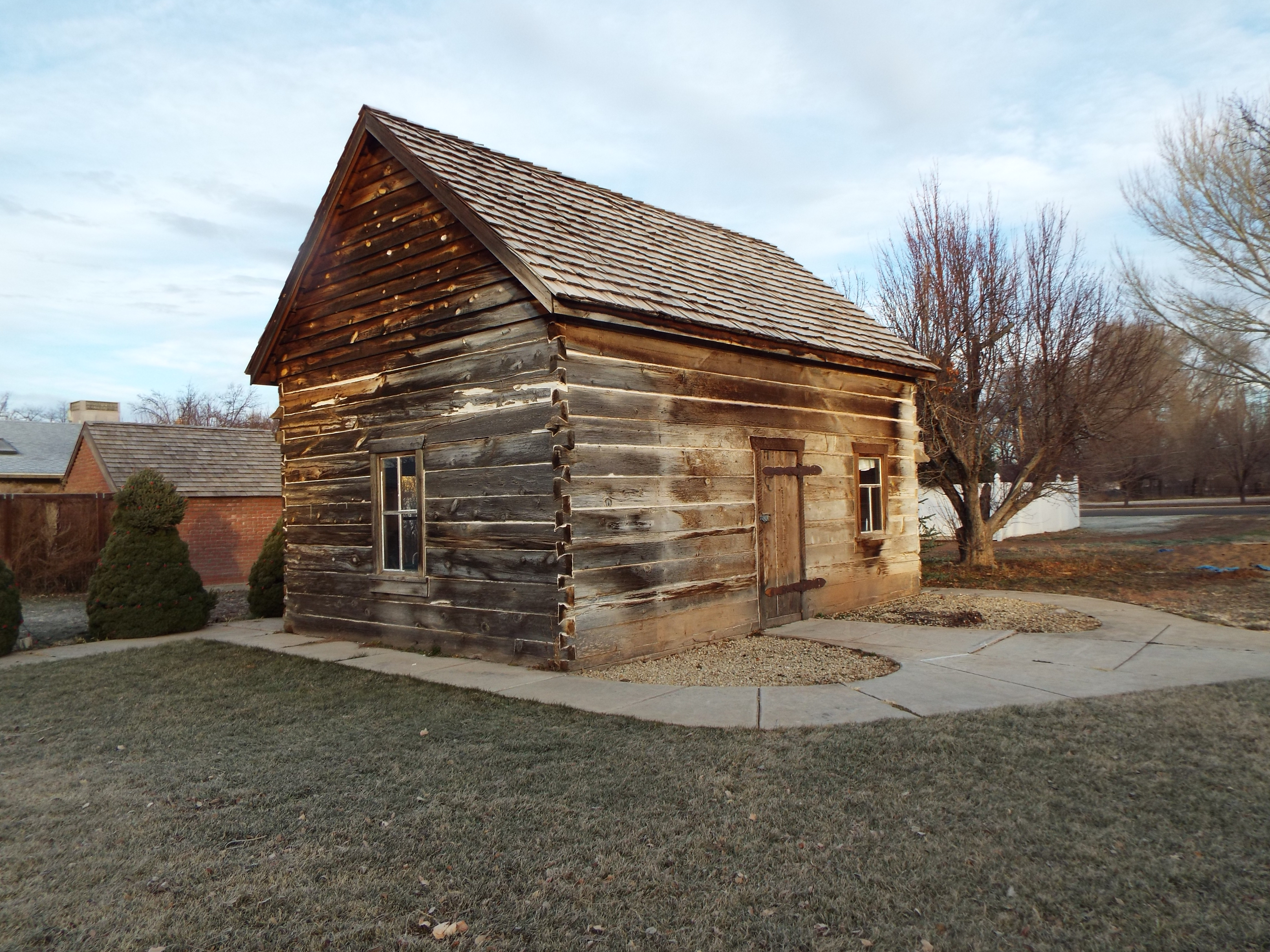
The William Jordan Flake Cabin

The Snowflake/Taylor Chamber of Commerce and the Snowflake Heritage Foundation are in charge of the preservation of the historical structures in Snowflake. Among which are included the Stinson Museum and Pioneer Homes.

The Stinson museum has displays of artifacts and pictures from the early days of Snowflake, from prehistoric Native-American tribes to 19th century pioneers. The museum, which is housed in the old Stinson/Flake Ranch House, is located at 102 N. 1st St. E. Among the historic houses which can be visited are, three which are listed in the National Register of Historic Places, the James M. Flake House, the Jessie N. Smith House, the John A. Freeman House and the William J. Flake Cabin.

== Structures pictured ==
The following historic properties in Snowflake are pictured:

- The James Madison Flake House built in 1896 and located on Stinson and Hunt Sts. Listed in the National Register Places on July 14, 1971, reference: #71000113.
- The John A. Freeman House built in 1893 and located on Main and Freeman Sts. Listed in the National Register Places on November 25, 1980, reference: #80000768.
- The John Riley Hulet House built in 1883 and located on Hulet Ave. and Smith St. Listed in the National Register Places on March 25, 1980, reference: #80000769.
- The Jessie Nathaniel Smith House built in 1906 and located on 203 W. Smith Ave. Listed in the National Register Places on July 14, 1971, reference: #71000114.
- The Sank and Louise Flake House built in 1920 and located on Stinson and Hunt Sts.
- The Stinson/Flake Ranch House built in 1878 and located on Freeman Ave and Stinson St. This structure now houses the Stinson Museum. Listed in the National Register Places on March 10, 1982, reference: #82001621.
- The William Jordan Flake Cabin built in 1858 and located on Stinson and Hunt Sts.
- The Snowflake Stake Academy Building built in 1913 and located on Ballard and Hulet Aves. Listed in the National Register Places on March 25, 1980, reference: #80000770.
- The Flake Brothers Store built in 1912 and located on Main Street.
Historic Snowflake, Arizona

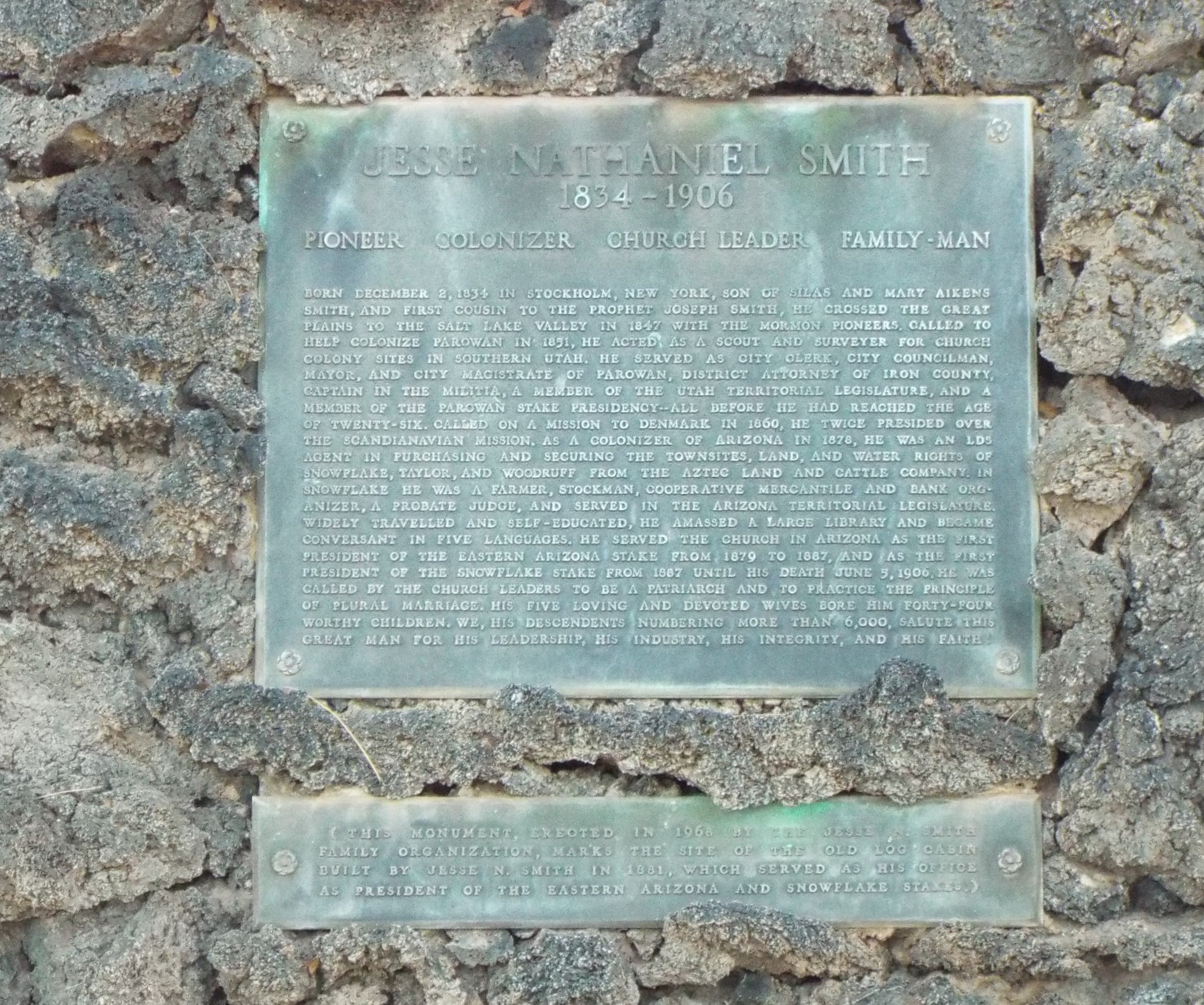
Jessie Nathaniel Smith House Marker

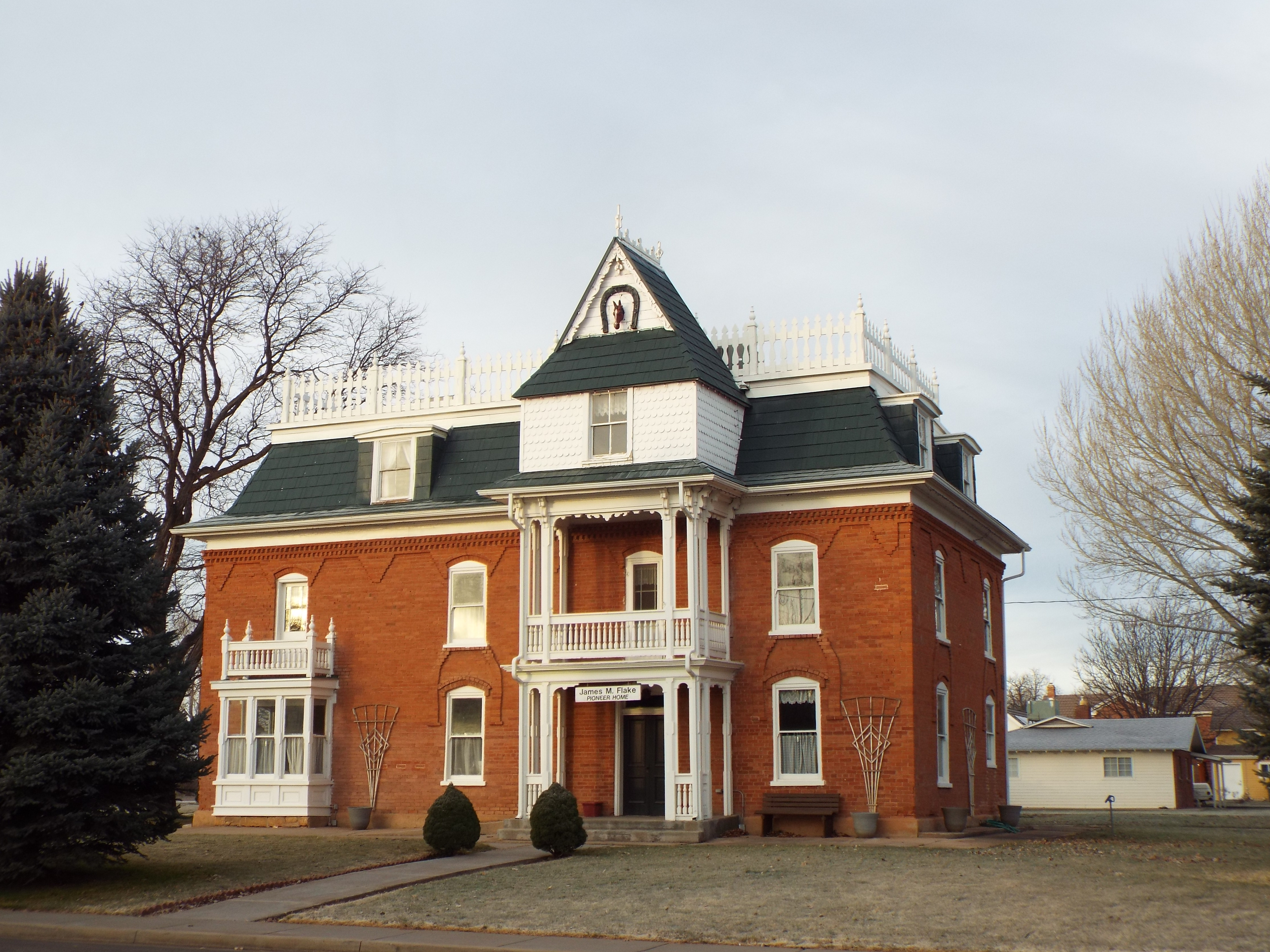
James Madison Flake House – 1896

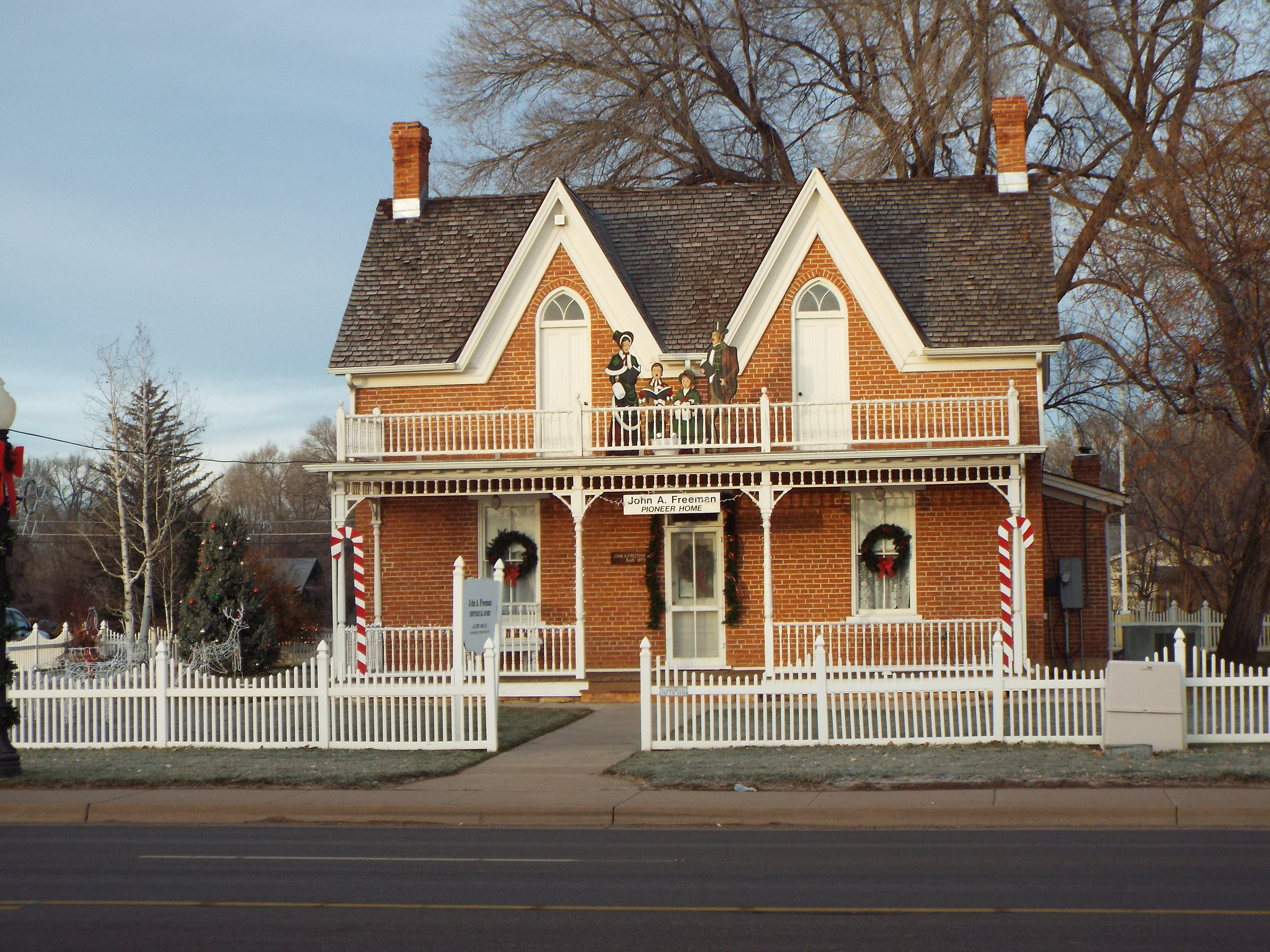
John A. Freeman House – 1893

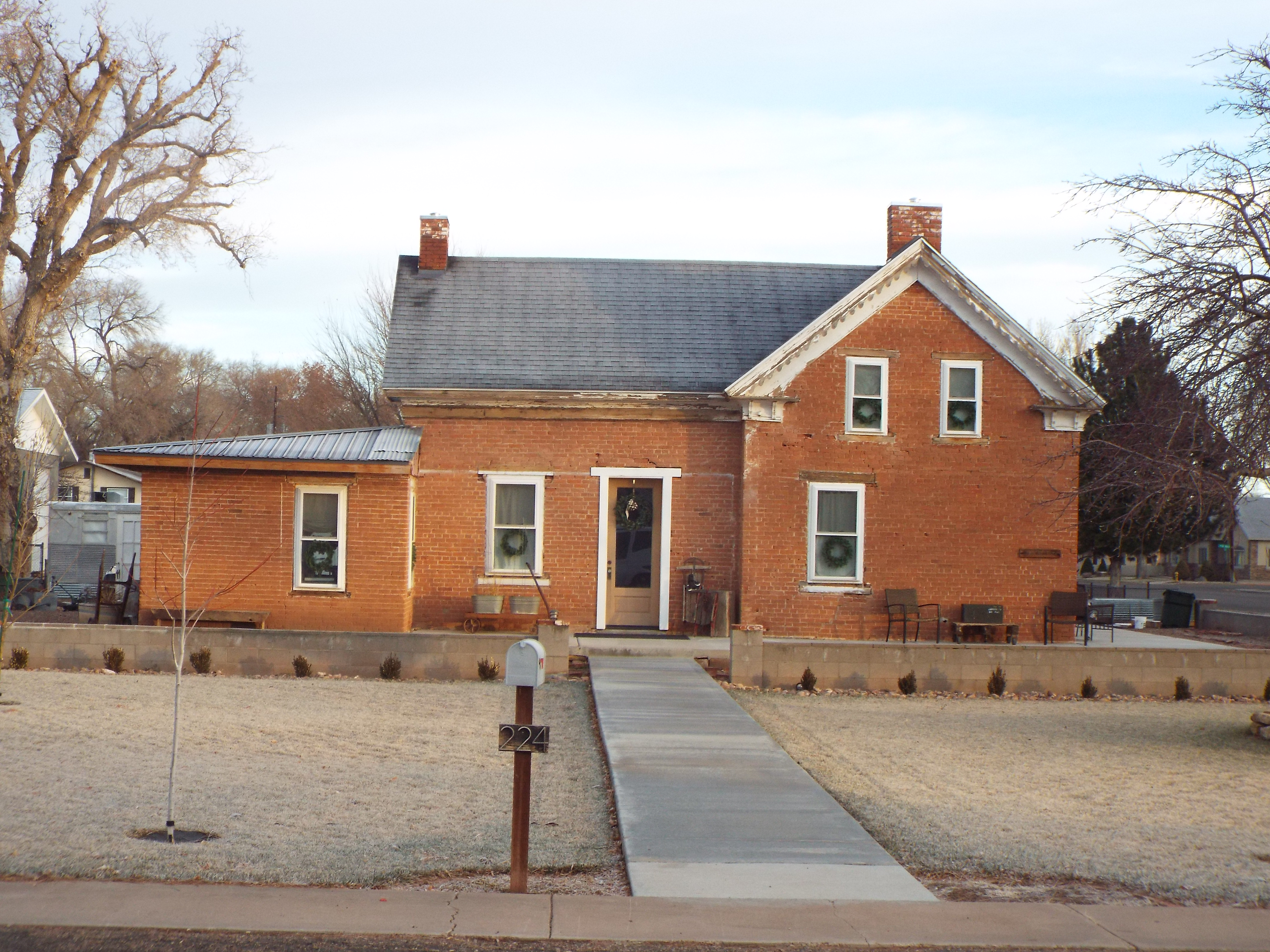
John Riley Hulet House – 1883

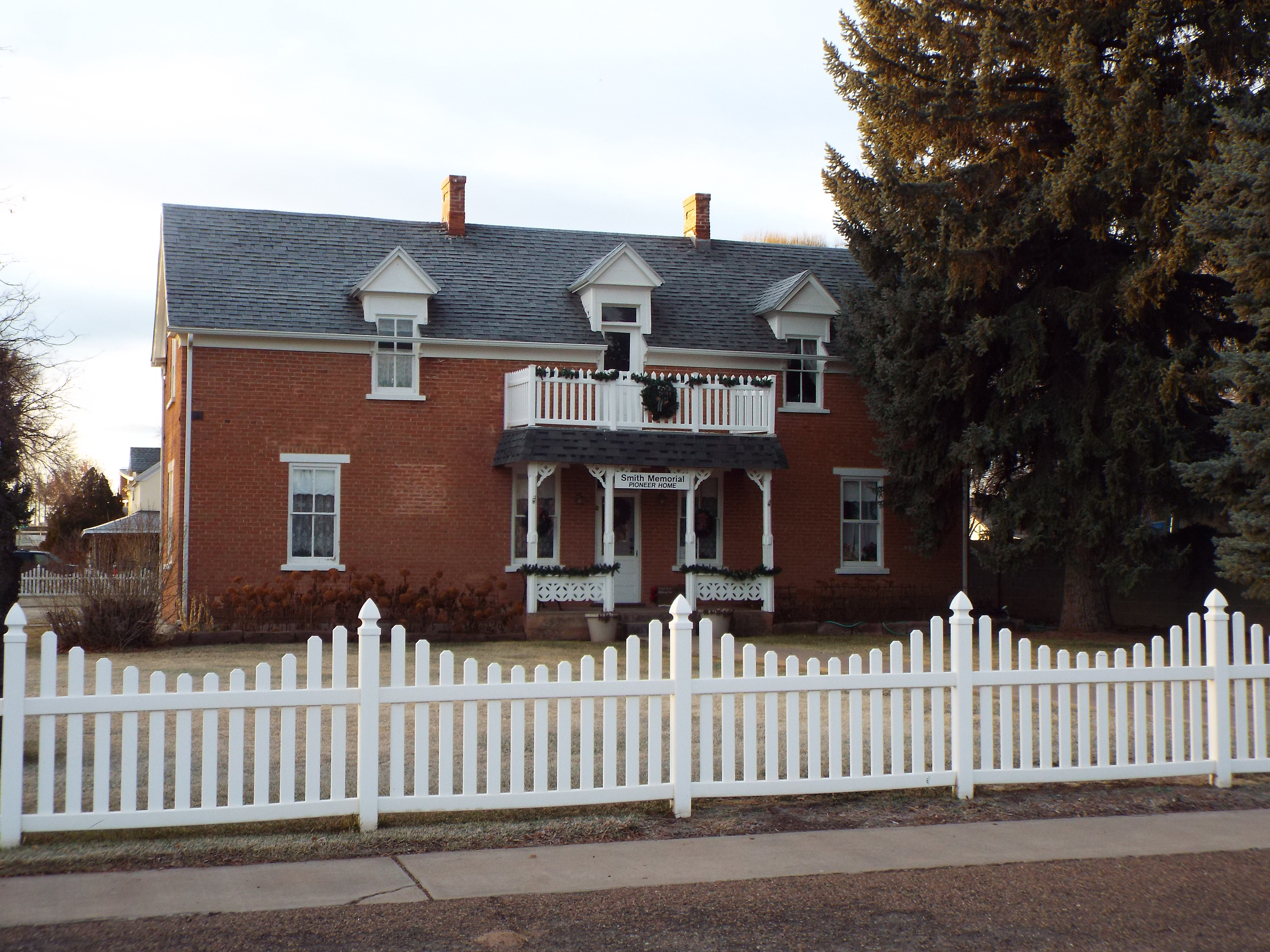
Jessie Nathaniel Smith House – 1906

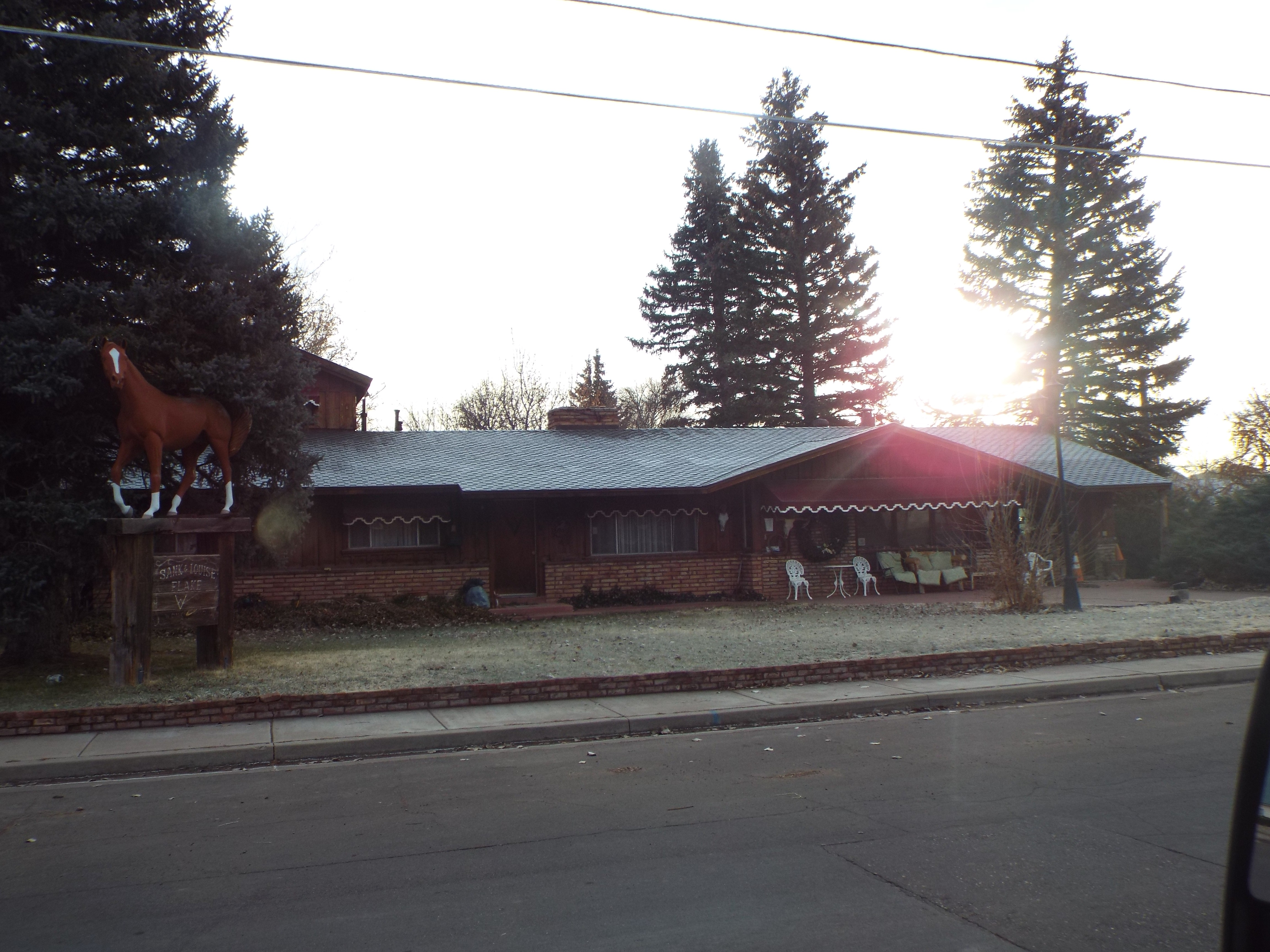
Sank and Louise Flake House – 1920

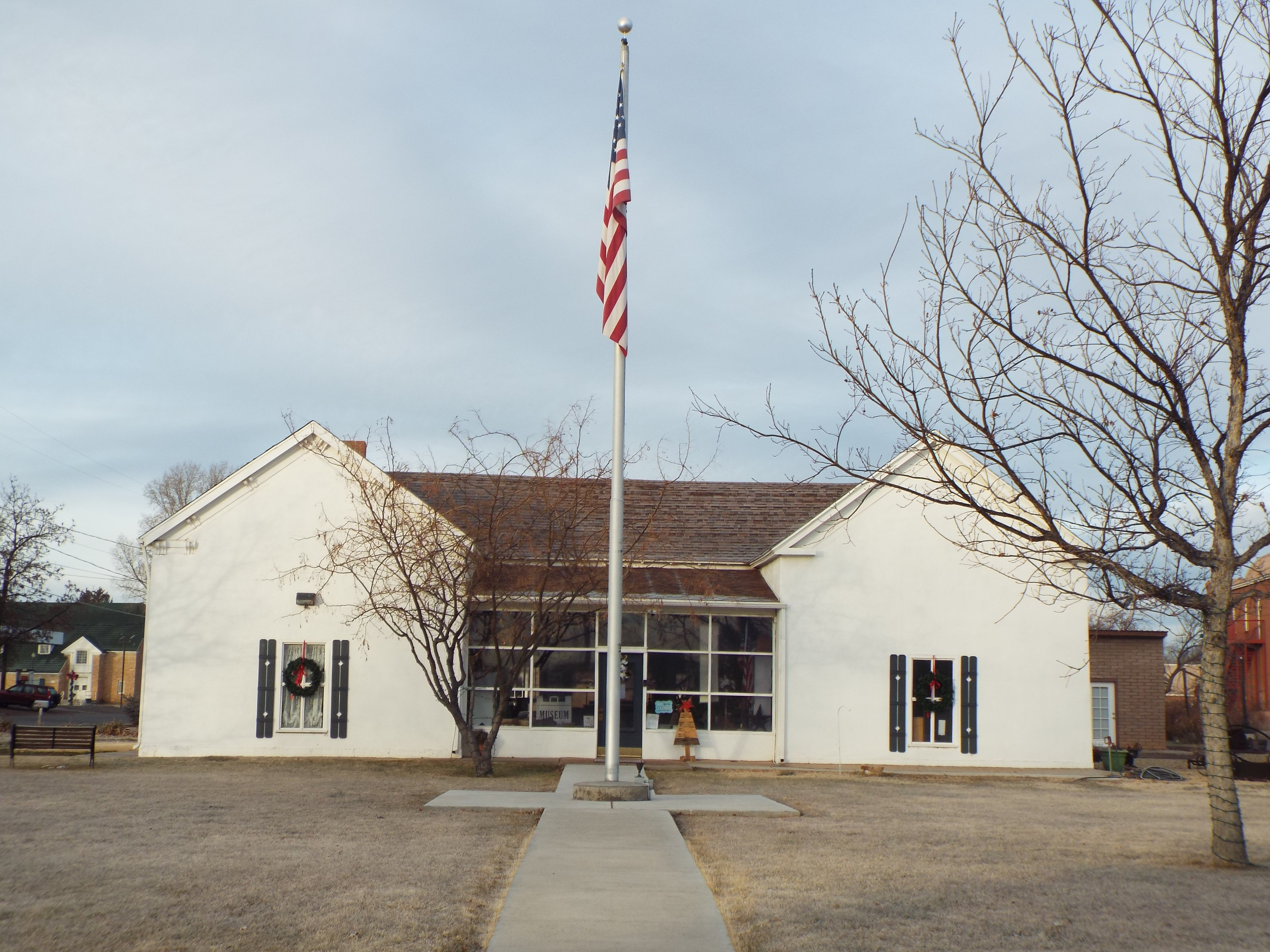
Stinson/Flake Ranch House – 1878

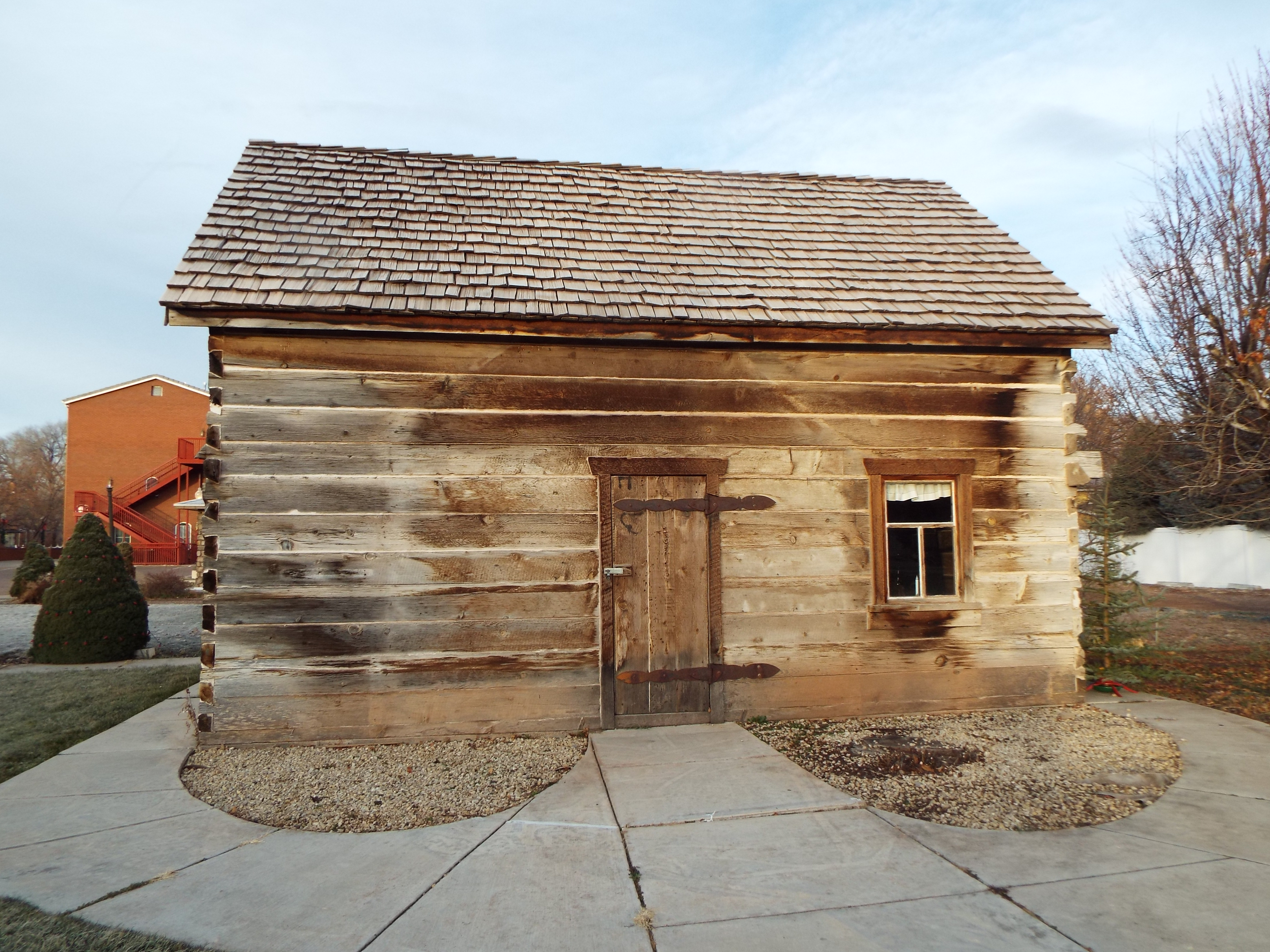
William Jordan Flake Cabin – 1858

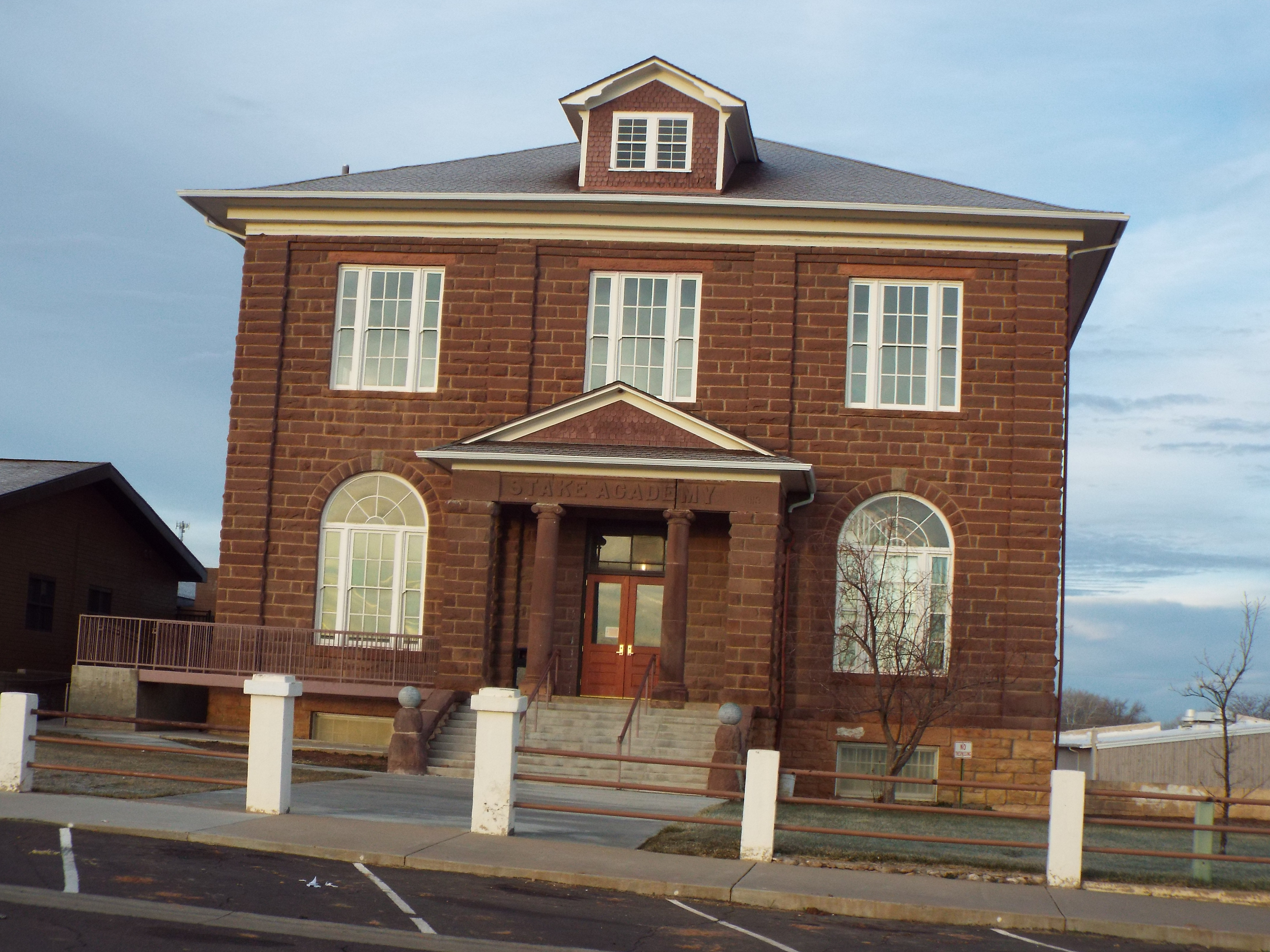
Snowflake Stake Academy Building – 1913

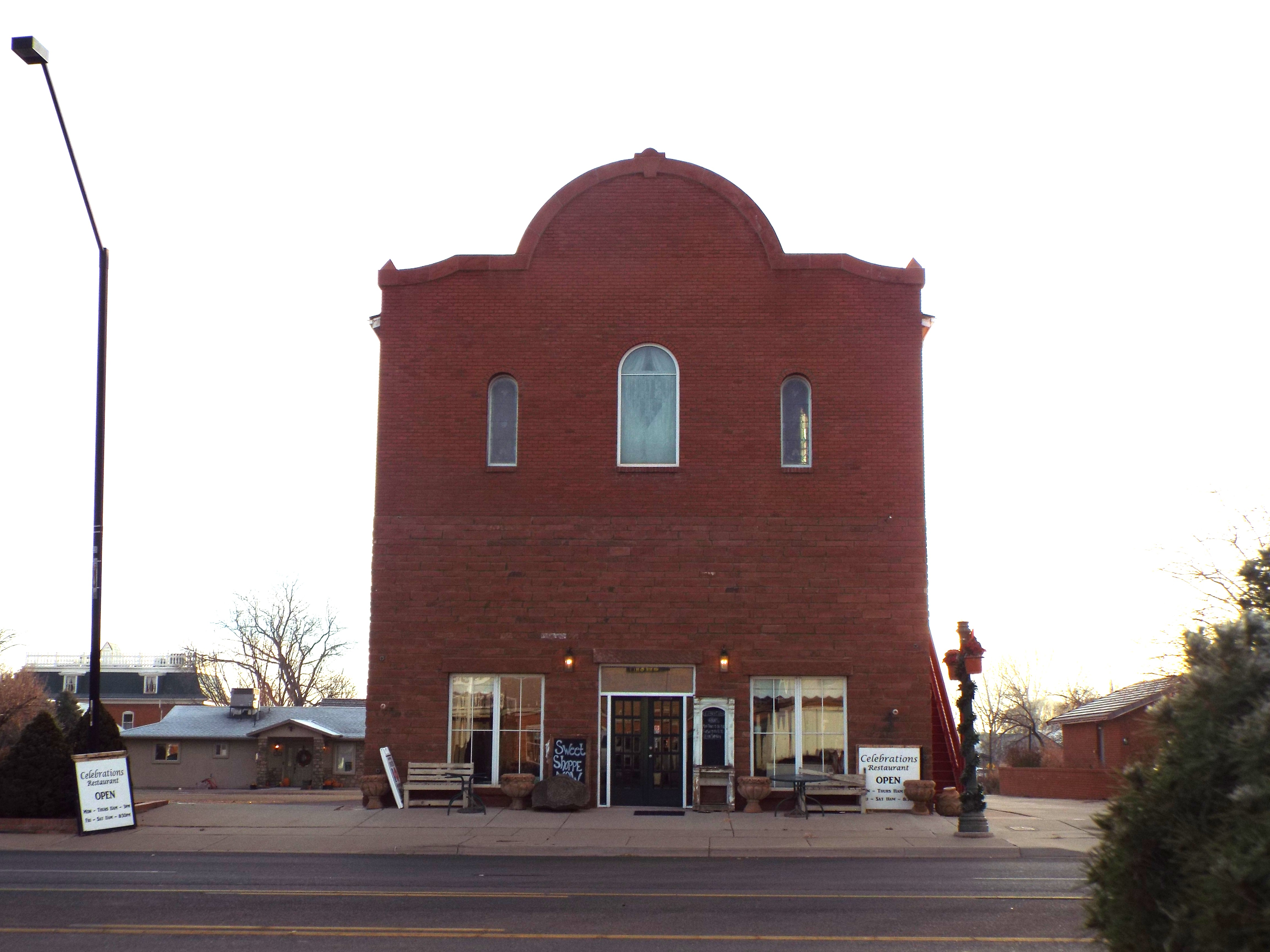
Flake Brothers Store – 1912

== See also ==
- National Register of Historic Places listings in Navajo County, Arizona
