= National Cannabis Industry Association =

American organization representing cannabis-related businesses

National Cannabis Industry Association (NCIA)
- Logo of the National Cannabis Industry Association
- Founded: 2010
- Founder: Aaron Smith and Steve Fox
- Type: Trade association
- Purpose: Legalization of cannabis in the United States; Commercialization of cannabis sales
- Location: Washington, D.C., U.S.
- Region served: United States
- Website: thecannabisindustry.org

The National Cannabis Industry Association (NCIA) is an American non-profit organization based in the District of Columbia, with an additional office in Denver, Colorado. NCIA is the largest cannabis trade association in the U.S. and the only organization representing state-sanctioned cannabis-related businesses at the federal level. Its mission is "to promote the growth of a responsible and legitimate cannabis industry and work for a favorable social, economic and legal environment for that industry in the United States." The organization was founded in late 2010 and has been described as the "first national trade group for the cannabis industry" in the United States.

As the cannabis industry has grown and matured dramatically in recent years, NCIA has grown with it. The group officially held its first board meeting on December 16, 2010, with a small handful of members. In January 2013, NCIA had 118 member businesses. In January 2014, NCIA had "nearly 400" member businesses. As of July 2017, NCIA had nearly 1,400 member businesses. In June 2019, NCIA reported nearly 2,000 member businesses.

The NCIA has been negatively compared to the lobbying arms of the alcohol and tobacco industries, with activists worried that it could harm legalization efforts.

In February 2020, the organization brought on five new board members; Canopy Rivers president and CEO Narbe Alexandrian, Law Offices of Omar Figueroa Inc. principal Omar Figueroa, Rocky Mountain Reagents Inc. VP Liz Geisleman, Copperstate Farms general counsel Ryan Hurley and Indica LLC and Stick Ypsi co-founder Chris Jackson.

== Work ==
The NCIA promotes a multitude of virtues it sees in the cannabis plant and its trade, including how the plant may help heal the sick, how legalization adds much-needed tax dollars to government coffers on the local, state, and national levels, and how these and other benefits radiate out into communities.

The NCIA lobbies Congress to tax cannabis fairly and to allow cannabis businesses easier access to the banking industry.

The trade group's work also extends to the local level; it helps marijuana and medical marijuana businesses navigate a patchwork of laws that differ by state and locality.

NCIA also hosts educational and training events for members and others interested in learning about the cannabis industry. In June 2014, NCIA hosted the first national Cannabis Business Summit, a two-day event featuring more than 1,000 attendees and numerous discussions of regulations, banking, product lines, insurance, energy efficiency, human resources and other issues related to the burgeoning marijuana industry. Since then, the Cannabis Business Summit has been held annually, and the 2017 Cannabis Business Summit featured 4,500 attendees and a keynote address from former President of Mexico Vicente Fox. The 2019 Cannabis Business Summit hosted over 10,000 attendees and featured a blues-themed closing celebration with actor Jim Belushi.

On August 29, 2012, leaders launched the National Cannabis Industry Association PAC to contribute funds to cannabis-friendly politicians and causes.

In 2016 NCIA launched NCIA's Cannabis Industry Voice, a podcast covering the ever-changing legal and business landscape of cannabis in the United States.

In 2018, NCIA spent $560,000 on political lobbying, roughly 21% of total U.S. cannabis industry lobbying spending of $2.7 million.

In 2019, NCIA, the American Bankers Association, and the Credit Union National Association all came out in favor of the SAFE Banking Act, which would allow banks and credit unions to work with cannabis businesses in states where such businesses are legal. The National Association of State Treasurers, the National Association of Attorneys General, and all 50 state banking associations have also endorsed the SAFE Banking Act.

On July 18, 2019, NCIA joined 4Front Holdings and more than 100 other signatories in submitting an open letter to the House Judiciary Committee, calling for the removal of cannabis from the Controlled Substances Act and for efforts to address the racially disparate harm caused by federal cannabis prohibition.

In June 2020, NCIA launched their Diversity, Equity and Inclusion Initiatives under the leadership of DEI Manager, Tahir Johnson, including the Social Equity Scholarship Program which now grants complimentary membership to over 100 social equity applicants and operators around the country.

In 2024, the NCIA announced their support for the proposed rescheduling of cannabis from Schedule I to Schedule III by Joe Biden. In 2025, following blocks by the new Republican administration, the NCIA, with attorney Ellen Brown among other advocates, fought with the Drug Enforcement Administration for the removal of cannabis from Schedule I.

== Members ==
As of March 2021, the National Cannabis Industry Association has nearly 1,500 member businesses.

== Reception ==
In a Huffington Post interview, Mark Kleiman, the "Pot Czar" of Washington state, said he was concerned that the NCIA would favor profits over public health. He also said that it could become a predatory body like the lobbying arms of the tobacco and alcohol industries. Kleiman said: "The fact that the National Cannabis Industry Association has hired itself a K Street suit [lobbyist] is not a good sign."

== See also ==
- Marijuana Policy Project – American organization
- National Organization for the Reform of Marijuana Laws – American social welfare organization
