= Snowflake High School =

Coordinates: 34°29′26″N 110°04′56″W

- Home of the Lobos

Location
- 190 S 2nd W Snowflake, Arizona 85937; United States

Information
- Type: Public
- Established: 1888 (138 years ago)
- School district: Snowflake Unified School District
- CEEB code: 030420
- Principal: Shane Brimhall
- Staff: 38.53 (FTE)
- Grades: 9–12
- Enrollment: 922 (2023–2024)
- Student to teacher ratio: 23.93
- Colors: Royal blue and white
- Mascot: Lobos
- Website: hs.susd5.org

Snowflake High School is one of the oldest schools in Arizona. It was founded in the late 19th century for the education of Snowflake's youth. In 1888 the Snowflake Stake Academy was established to provide education beyond the 8th grade for all who cared to attend. It was established by The Church of Jesus Christ of Latter-day Saints as part of its Church Educational System. In 1924, the Snowflake Union High School District was created and the Stake Academy was closed.

Snowflake High School is part of Snowflake Unified School District which serves Snowflake, Arizona, and neighboring Taylor, Arizona.

Snowflake High School hosts the town's annual Groundhog breakfast.

== Notable alumni ==
- Sylvia Allen - Arizona State legislature
- Jake Flake - Arizona State legislature
- Jeff Flake - US Senator and Amabassador to Turkey
- Buzz Miller - Dancer
- Travis Walton - Author
- Grant Turley ("The Snowflake Storm") - World War 2 pilot Missing in Action

== State championships ==
- Golf: 2010, 2009, 2008, 2005, 2004, 1998, 1997, 1994, 1993, 1985
- Football: 2021, 2020, 1993, 1992, 1991, 1988, 1986, 1982
- Boys' Basketball: 2015, 1989, 1984, 1982
- Girls' Basketball: 1997, 1991, 1984, 1982, 1980, 1977
- Boys' Track and Field: 2023, 2022, 2021, 2017, 2016, 2015, 2007, 2005, 2004, 1959
- Girls' Track and Field: 2023, 2021, 2019, 2018
- Wrestling: 1982
- Baseball: 1987, 1981, 1970
- Softball: 2001, 1989, 1987, 1986
- Volleyball: 2023, 1996, 1991, 1981, 1980
