= Snowflake, Arizona =

Town in Navajo County, Arizona, U.S.

- Town
- Flag

- Location of Snowflake in Navajo County, Arizona.

- Location in the United States Location in Arizona
- Coordinates: 34°31′20″N 110°05′29″W
- Country: United States
- State: Arizona
- County: Navajo
- Founded: 1878
- Founder: Erastus Snow and William Jordan Flake

Government
  - Type: Council-Manager
  - Body: Snowflake Town Council
  - Mayor: Byron Lewis

Area
  - Total: 33.80 sq mi (87.54 km^{2})
  - Land: 33.74 sq mi (87.39 km^{2})
  - Water: 0.058 sq mi (0.15 km^{2})
- Elevation: 5,686 ft (1,733 m)

Population (2020)
  - Total: 6,104
  - Density: 180.9/sq mi (69.85/km^{2})
- Time zone: UTC-7 (Mountain)
  - Summer (DST): UTC−7 (no DST/PDT)
- ZIP codes: 85937, 85942
- Area code: 928
- FIPS code: 04-67800
- GNIS ID(s): 2413301
- Website: snowflakeaz.gov

Snowflake (Navajo: Tó Diłhił Biih Yílį́) is a town in Navajo County, Arizona, United States. It was founded in 1878 by Erastus Snow and William Jordan Flake, Mormon pioneers. As of the 2020 census, Snowflake had a population of 6,104. Snowflake is 25 miles (40 km) south of Interstate 40 (formerly U.S. Route 66) via Highway 77. The Apache Railway provides freight service.

== Geography ==
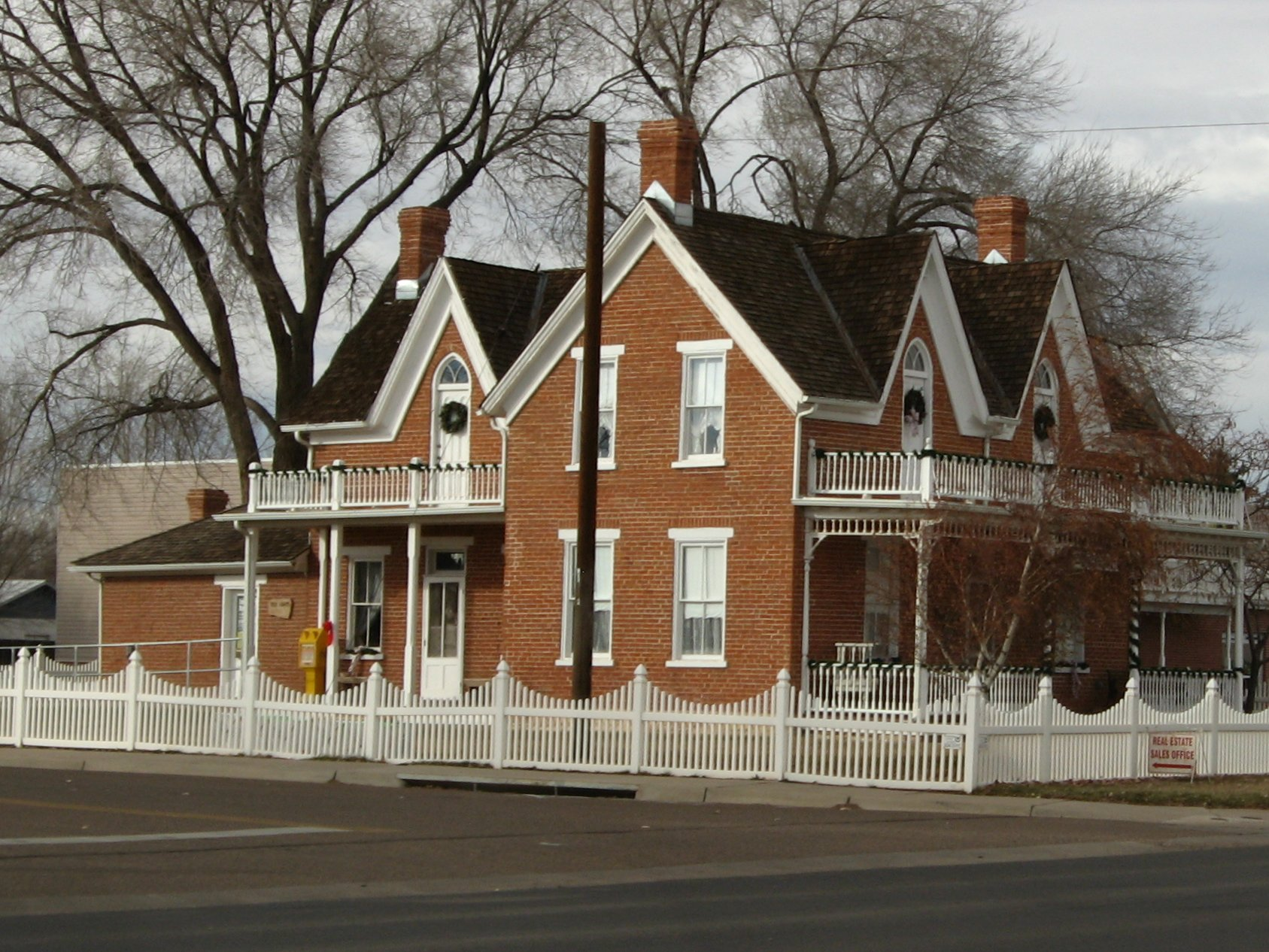
Historic Home, Snowflake, Arizona

According to the United States Census Bureau, the town has a total area of 30.9 square miles (80 km^{2}), of which 30.8 square miles (80 km^{2}) are land and 0.1 square miles (0.26 km^{2}) (0.16%) are water.

== Demographics ==
Historical population
Census	Pop.	Note	%±
1880	275		—
1910	494		—
1920	758		53.4%
1930	1,259		66.1%
1950	929		—
1960	982		5.7%
1970	1,977		101.3%
1980	3,510		77.5%
1990	3,679		4.8%
2000	4,460		21.2%
2010	5,590		25.3%
2020	6,104		9.2%
U.S. Decennial Census

=== 2020 census ===
As of the 2020 census, Snowflake had a population of 6,104. The median age was 33.9 years. 33.5% of residents were under the age of 18 and 17.6% of residents were 65 years of age or older. For every 100 females there were 100.4 males, and for every 100 females age 18 and over there were 97.3 males age 18 and over.

62.1% of residents lived in urban areas, while 37.9% lived in rural areas.

There were 1,895 households in Snowflake, of which 42.7% had children under the age of 18 living in them. Of all households, 62.0% were married-couple households, 13.8% were households with a male householder and no spouse or partner present, and 19.8% were households with a female householder and no spouse or partner present. About 17.5% of all households were made up of individuals and 10.4% had someone living alone who was 65 years of age or older.

There were 2,132 housing units, of which 11.1% were vacant. The homeowner vacancy rate was 2.6% and the rental vacancy rate was 11.8%.

Racial composition as of the 2020 census
Race	Number	Percent
White	5,034	82.5%
Black or African American	21	0.3%
American Indian and Alaska Native	311	5.1%
Asian	23	0.4%
Native Hawaiian and Other Pacific Islander	19	0.3%
Some other race	184	3.0%
Two or more races	512	8.4%
Hispanic or Latino (of any race)	665	10.9%

=== 2000 census ===
As of the census of 2000, there were 4,460 people, 1,312 households, and 1,070 families residing in the town. The population density was 144.8 inhabitants per square mile (55.9/km^{2}). There were 1,536 housing units at an average density of 49.9 per square mile (19.3/km^{2}). The racial makeup of the town was 87.2% White, 0.3% Black or African American, 6.9% Native American, 0.5% Asian, 0.1% Pacific Islander, 3.0% from other races, and 2.0% from two or more races. 8.1% of the population were Hispanic or Latino of any race.

There were 1,312 households, out of which 46.5% had children under the age of 18 living with them, 69.5% were married couples living together, 9.1% had a female householder with no husband present, and 18.4% were non-families. 15.8% of all households were made up of individuals, and 6.7% had someone living alone who was 65 years of age or older. The average household size was 3.37 and the average family size was 3.81.

In the town, the population was spread out, with 37.9% under the age of 18, 9.8% from 18 to 24, 21.8% from 25 to 44, 19.8% from 45 to 64, and 10.7% who were 65 years of age or older. The median age was 28 years. For every 100 females, there were 99.7 males. For every 100 females age 18 and over, there were 95.3 males.

The median income for a household in the town was $37,439, and the median income for a family was $42,500. Males had a median income of $30,517 versus $21,164 for females. The per capita income for the town was $13,391. About 10.4% of families and 15.0% of the population were below the poverty line, including 18.7% of those under age 18 and 14.1% of those age 65 or over.

=== Demographic trends ===
Recently, the town and surrounding area have experienced steady growth, primarily to the east, west and south. An additional 9-holes were added to the 18-hole golf course.

The remoteness of Snowflake and the low level of pollution attracts many individuals suffering from multiple chemical sensitivity syndrome (MCS) to the town. As of July 2016 there were approximately 20 households who report to be suffering from MCS.

== Economy ==
Major industries in Snowflake include pork production, electrical generation, and Cannabis cultivation. Copperstate Farms, a cannabis greenhouse and wholesaler, is the largest employer in the town.

== Education ==
Snowflake is a part of the Snowflake Unified School District, consisting of Highland Primary School, Snowflake Intermediate School, Snowflake Junior High and Snowflake High School. Taylor Elementary School in the neighboring town of Taylor, Arizona, is also part of the Snowflake Unified school District.

Northland Pioneer College's Silver Creek campus extension is located in Snowflake.

== Climate ==
Snowflake experiences a four-season semi-arid climate with a warm (sometimes hot) summer, mild autumn, mild to cold winter and cool, windy spring. Typical high temperatures hover around 90 °F (32 °C) during July and August and 30 (-1 °C) to 49 °F (13 °C) in December/January.

Climate data for Snowflake, Arizona
Month	Jan	Feb	Mar	Apr	May	Jun	Jul	Aug	Sep	Oct	Nov	Dec	Year
Record high °F (°C)	79 (26)	78 (26)	82 (28)	92 (33)	98 (37)	102 (39)	104 (40)	102 (39)	98 (37)	90 (32)	90 (32)	75 (24)	104 (40)
Mean daily maximum °F (°C)	48.6 (9.2)	55.0 (12.8)	60.8 (16.0)	68.8 (20.4)	77.2 (25.1)	87.3 (30.7)	90.0 (32.2)	87.2 (30.7)	81.7 (27.6)	71.2 (21.8)	58.0 (14.4)	48.9 (9.4)	69.6 (20.9)
Mean daily minimum °F (°C)	19.6 (−6.9)	22.9 (−5.1)	27.7 (−2.4)	32.7 (0.4)	39.9 (4.4)	47.6 (8.7)	56.2 (13.4)	55.1 (12.8)	47.6 (8.7)	36.0 (2.2)	26.1 (−3.3)	19.8 (−6.8)	35.9 (2.2)
Record low °F (°C)	−30 (−34)	−17 (−27)	−5 (−21)	3 (−16)	17 (−8)	20 (−7)	27 (−3)	28 (−2)	22 (−6)	11 (−12)	−17 (−27)	−24 (−31)	−30 (−34)
Average precipitation inches (mm)	0.73 (19)	0.72 (18)	1.01 (26)	0.42 (11)	0.59 (15)	0.33 (8.4)	1.75 (44)	2.44 (62)	1.64 (42)	1.25 (32)	0.93 (24)	0.89 (23)	12.7 (324.4)
Average snowfall inches (cm)	2.6 (6.6)	2.9 (7.4)	2.2 (5.6)	1.1 (2.8)	0.3 (0.76)	0.0 (0.0)	0.0 (0.0)	0.0 (0.0)	0.0 (0.0)	0.4 (1.0)	1.9 (4.8)	3.8 (9.7)	15.2 (38.66)
Average precipitation days (≥ 0.01 inch)	4.3	4.4	4.9	2.6	2.7	2.2	8.3	9.4	5.8	4.4	3.7	3.9	56.6
Average snowy days (≥ 0.1 inch)	1.5	1.1	1.1	0.3	0.0	0.0	0.0	0.0	0.0	0.2	0.6	1.4	6.2
Source: NOAA (extremes 1898–present)

== In popular culture ==
- Some members of the logging crew involved in the Travis Walton abduction incident live in this town, and several events surrounding that incident happened here. These events were dramatized in the sci-fi film Fire in the Sky (1993).
- The novel Snowflake, AZ by Marcus Sedgwick is set in the eponymous town and is about a young adult named Ash and his encounters within the community of people suffering from MCS.

== Notable people ==
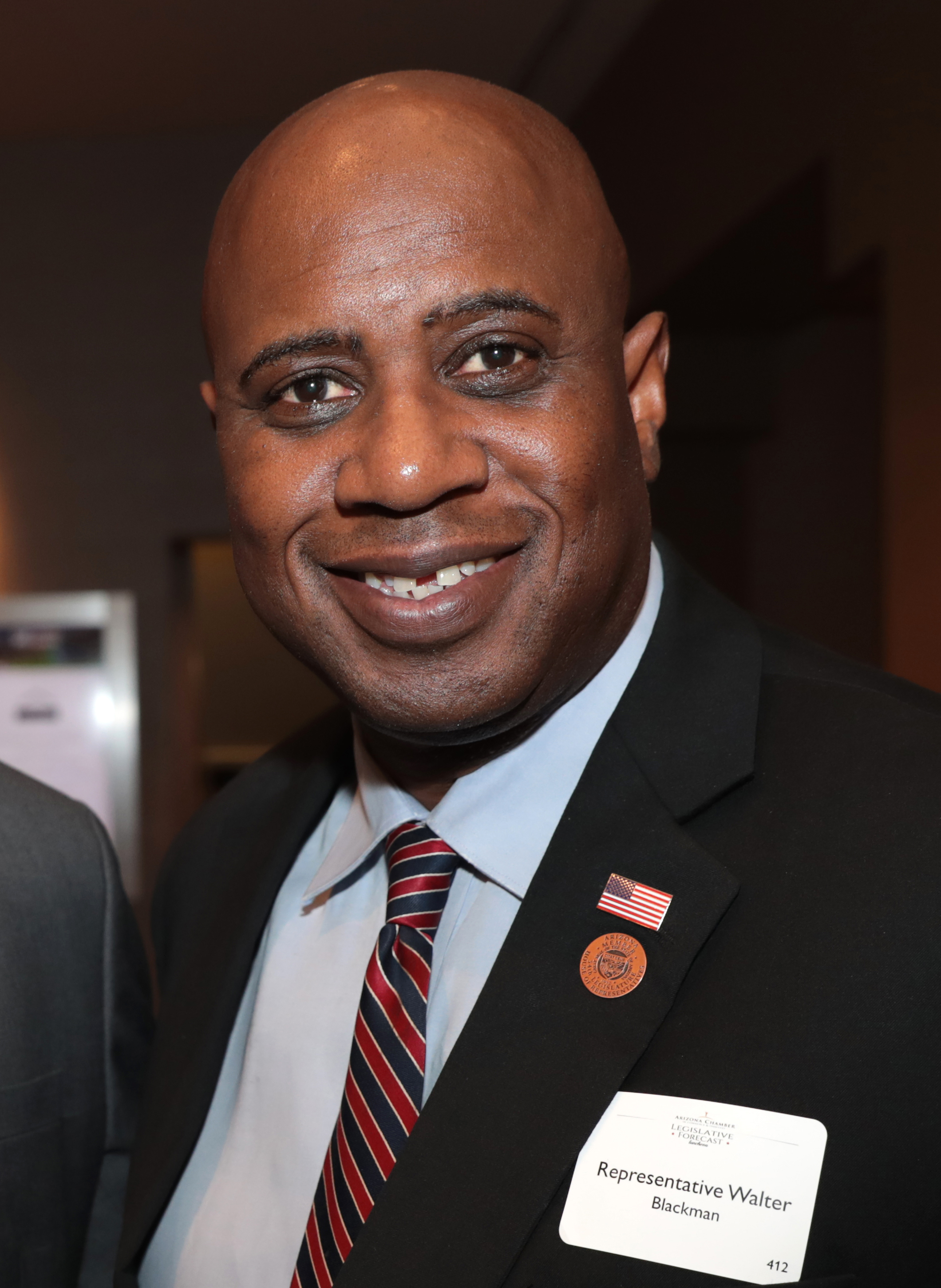
Walter Blackman, the first black Republican elected to the Arizona Legislature

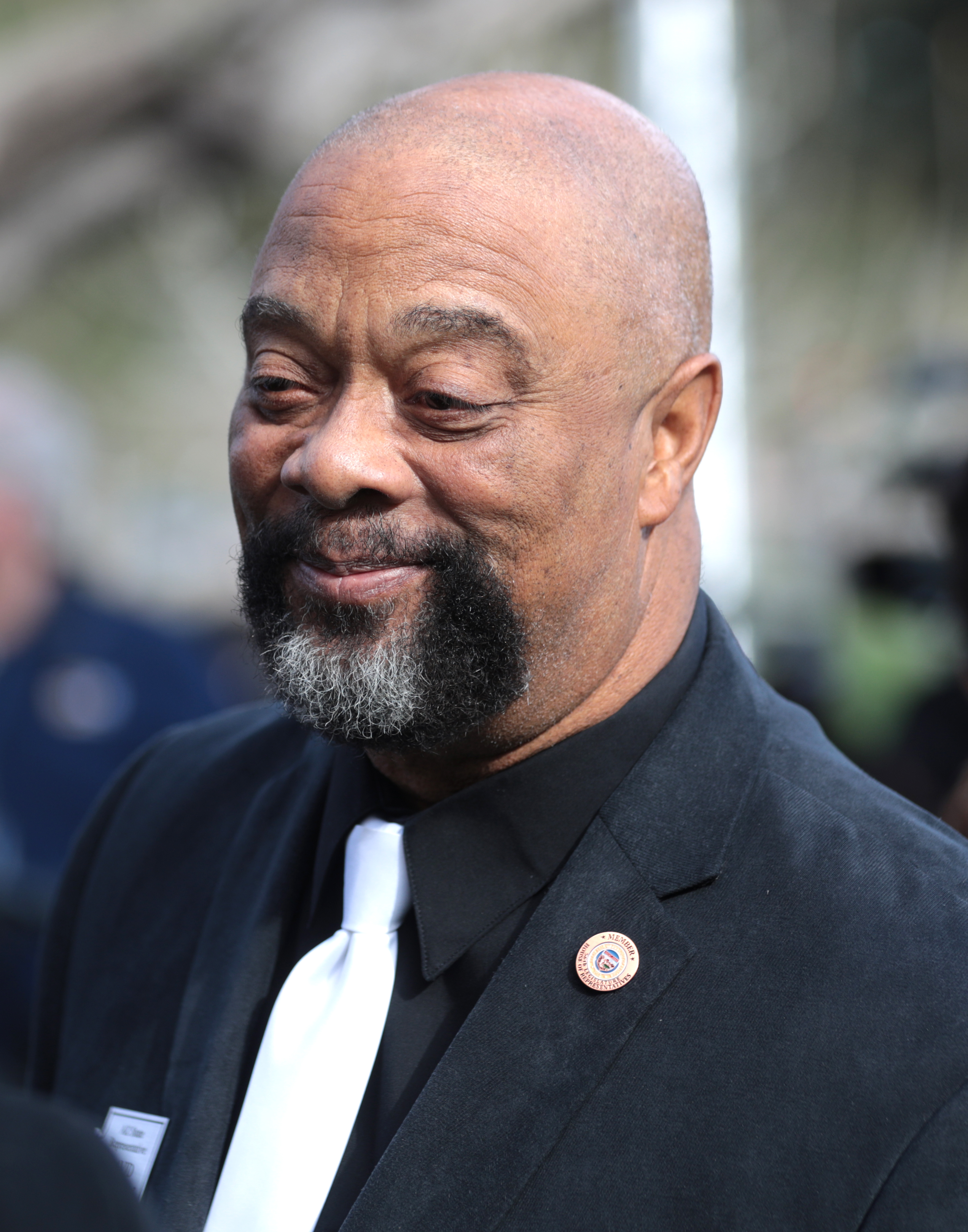
David Marshall, the second black Republican elected to the Arizona Legislature

- Walter Blackman, current Republican member of the Arizona House of Representatives
- Jeff Flake, former United States Ambassador to Turkey, former United States Senator
- Marilyn Jarrett (1939–2006), Arizona businesswoman and politician, was born in Snowflake.
- David Marshall, Republican member of the Arizona House of Representatives
- Buzz Miller (1923–1999), dancer, was born in Snowflake.
- Jesse N. Smith (1834–1906), Mormon pioneer, church leader, politician and colonizer of Snowflake. The Jesse N. Smith House in Snowflake is listed on the National Register of Historic Places.
- Travis Walton, who was allegedly abducted by space aliens, is an author and was played by D. B. Sweeney in the sci-fi film Fire in the Sky (1993), lives in Snowflake.

== See also ==
- List of historic properties in Snowflake, Arizona
