= Taylor, Arizona =

Town in Navajo County, Arizona

Taylor
- Town
- Taylor, Arizona
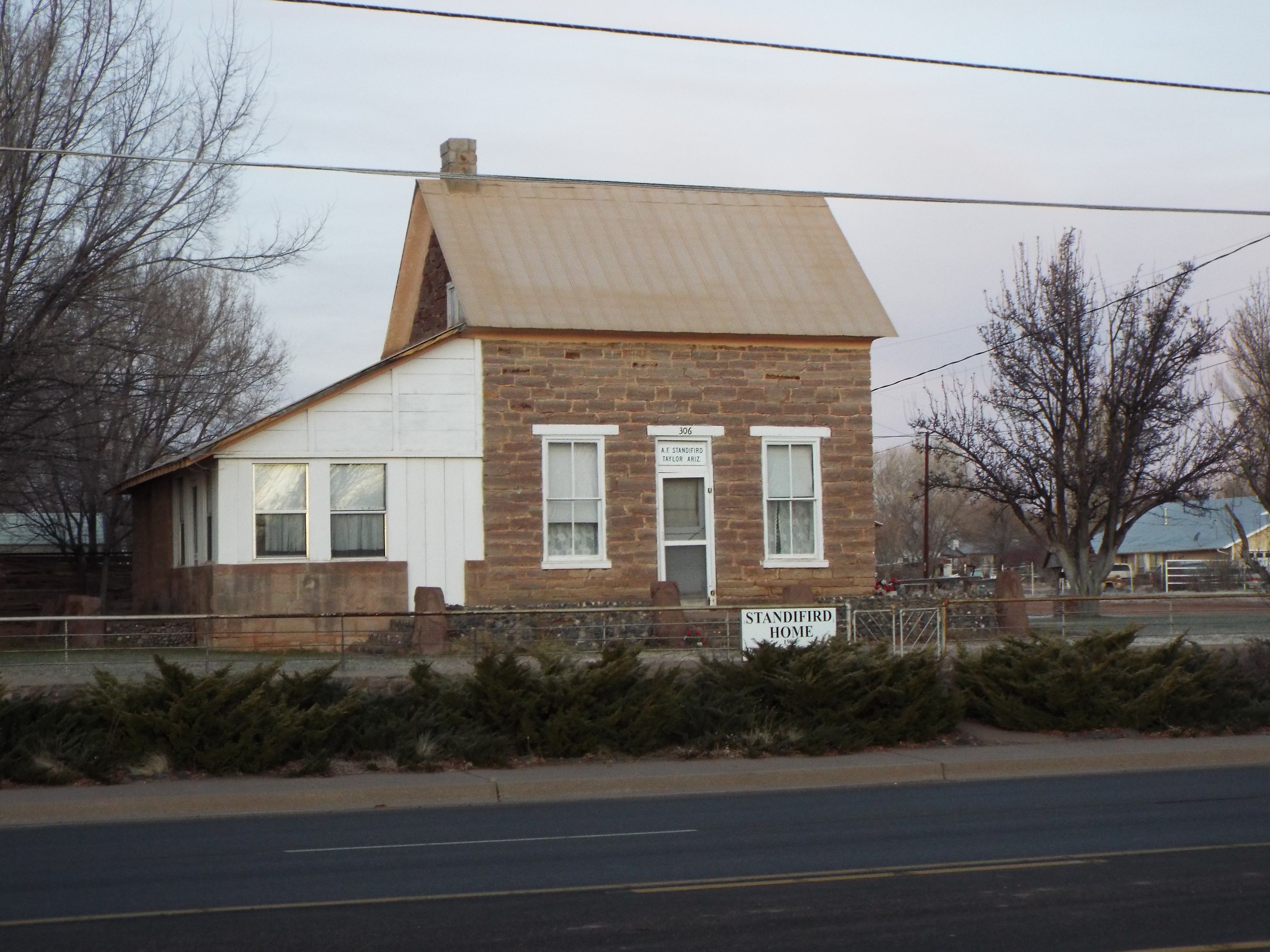
- Aguila Standifird House-1890

- Location of Taylor in Navajo County, Arizona

- Location in the United States
- Coordinates: 34°27′57″N 110°6′16″W
- Country: United States
- State: Arizona
- County: Navajo
- Established: 1878
- Founder: James Pearce

Government
  - Type: Council-Manager
  - Body: Taylor Town Council
  - Mayor: Shawn Palmer

Area
  - Total: 32.68 sq mi (84.65 km^{2})
  - Land: 32.66 sq mi (84.60 km^{2})
  - Water: 0.023 sq mi (0.06 km^{2})
- Elevation: 5,761 ft (1,756 m)

Population (2020)
  - Total: 3,995
  - Density: 122.3/sq mi (47.22/km^{2})
- Time zone: UTC-7 (Mountain)
  - Summer (DST): UTC−7 (no DST/PDT)
- ZIP code: 85939
- Area code: 928
- FIPS code: 04-72420
- GNIS ID(s): 2413369
- Website: Town of Taylor

Taylor is a town in Navajo County, Arizona, United States. It was founded by settlers of The Church of Jesus Christ of Latter-day Saints in January 1878, several months before the neighboring community of Snowflake. Taylor straddles Silver Creek, flowing from the nearby White Mountains to the Little Colorado River on Arizona's Colorado Plateau. As of the 2020 census, Taylor had a population of 3,995. The town was named for John Taylor, the third president of the Church of Jesus Christ of Latter-day Saints. There is no postal home delivery in Taylor; residents within a certain radius of the Post Office who produce proof of Taylor residency are allocated a small PO box free of charge.

== Railroads ==
Taylor was once served by the Apache Railway. The tracks were constructed between 1917–1920 and extended from the Santa Fe Railway at Holbrook, Arizona, to Snowflake and then via Taylor to the forests at McNary. The Snowflake to McNary line was abandoned in 1984.

== Geography ==
According to the United States Census Bureau, the town has a total area of 24.6 square miles (64 km^{2}), all land.

== Climate ==
Taylor experiences a four-season climate with a warm (sometimes hot) summer, mild autumn, mild to cold winter and cool, windy spring. Typical high temperatures hover around 90 °F (32 °C) during July and August and 30 to 55 °F (13 °C) in December/January.

Climate data for Taylor, Arizona
Month	Jan	Feb	Mar	Apr	May	Jun	Jul	Aug	Sep	Oct	Nov	Dec	Year
Record high °F (°C)	79 (26)	78 (26)	82 (28)	92 (33)	98 (37)	102 (39)	104 (40)	102 (39)	98 (37)	90 (32)	90 (32)	75 (24)	104 (40)
Mean daily maximum °F (°C)	48.6 (9.2)	55.0 (12.8)	60.8 (16.0)	68.8 (20.4)	77.2 (25.1)	87.3 (30.7)	90.0 (32.2)	87.2 (30.7)	81.7 (27.6)	71.2 (21.8)	58.0 (14.4)	48.9 (9.4)	69.6 (20.9)
Mean daily minimum °F (°C)	19.6 (−6.9)	22.9 (−5.1)	27.7 (−2.4)	32.7 (0.4)	39.9 (4.4)	47.6 (8.7)	56.2 (13.4)	55.1 (12.8)	47.6 (8.7)	36.0 (2.2)	26.1 (−3.3)	19.8 (−6.8)	35.9 (2.2)
Record low °F (°C)	−30 (−34)	−17 (−27)	−5 (−21)	3 (−16)	17 (−8)	20 (−7)	27 (−3)	28 (−2)	22 (−6)	11 (−12)	−17 (−27)	−24 (−31)	−30 (−34)
Average precipitation inches (mm)	0.73 (19)	0.72 (18)	1.01 (26)	0.42 (11)	0.59 (15)	0.33 (8.4)	1.75 (44)	2.44 (62)	1.64 (42)	1.25 (32)	0.93 (24)	0.89 (23)	12.7 (324.4)
Average snowfall inches (cm)	2.6 (6.6)	2.9 (7.4)	2.2 (5.6)	1.1 (2.8)	0.3 (0.76)	0.0 (0.0)	0.0 (0.0)	0.0 (0.0)	0.0 (0.0)	0.4 (1.0)	1.9 (4.8)	3.8 (9.7)	15.2 (38.66)
Average precipitation days (≥ 0.01 inch)	4.3	4.4	4.9	2.6	2.7	2.2	8.3	9.4	5.8	4.4	3.7	3.9	56.6
Average snowy days (≥ 0.1 inch)	1.5	1.1	1.1	0.3	0.0	0.0	0.0	0.0	0.0	0.2	0.6	1.4	6.2
Source: NOAA (extremes 1898–present)

== Demographics ==
Historical population
Census	Pop.	Note	%±
1970	888		—
1980	1,915		115.7%
1990	2,418		26.3%
2000	3,176		31.3%
2010	4,112		29.5%
2020	3,995		−2.8%
U.S. Decennial Census

=== 2020 census ===
As of the 2020 census, Taylor had a population of 3,995. The median age was 34.0 years. 31.8% of residents were under the age of 18 and 16.6% of residents were 65 years of age or older. For every 100 females there were 98.8 males, and for every 100 females age 18 and over there were 94.8 males age 18 and over.

38.8% of residents lived in urban areas, while 61.2% lived in rural areas.

There were 1,312 households in Taylor, of which 38.9% had children under the age of 18 living in them. Of all households, 60.3% were married-couple households, 14.6% were households with a male householder and no spouse or partner present, and 20.4% were households with a female householder and no spouse or partner present. About 19.6% of all households were made up of individuals and 8.5% had someone living alone who was 65 years of age or older.

There were 1,440 housing units, of which 8.9% were vacant. The homeowner vacancy rate was 2.5% and the rental vacancy rate was 6.0%.

Racial composition as of the 2020 census
Race	Number	Percent
White	3,359	84.1%
Black or African American	15	0.4%
American Indian and Alaska Native	183	4.6%
Asian	16	0.4%
Native Hawaiian and Other Pacific Islander	1	0.0%
Some other race	190	4.8%
Two or more races	231	5.8%
Hispanic or Latino (of any race)	507	12.7%

=== 2000 census ===
As of the census of 2000, there were 3,176 people, 946 households, and 771 families residing in the town. The population density was 129.1 inhabitants per square mile (49.8/km^{2}). There were 1,041 housing units at an average density of 42.3 per square mile (16.3/km^{2}). The racial makeup of the town was 89.0% White, 0.5% Black or African American, 5.3% Native American, 0.1% Asian, 0.1% Pacific Islander, 2.7% from other races, and 2.3% from two or more races. 9.2% of the population were Hispanic or Latino of any race.

There were 946 households, out of which 48.8% had children under the age of 18 living with them, 68.6% were married couples living together, 9.1% had a female householder with no husband present, and 18.4% were non-families. 16.9% of all households were made up of individuals, and 7.3% had someone living alone who was 65 years of age or older. The average household size was 3.36 and the average family size was 3.81.

In the town, the population was spread out, with 40.1% under the age of 18, 9.2% from 18 to 24, 24.7% from 25 to 44, 17.7% from 45 to 64, and 8.2% who were 65 years of age or older. The median age was 26 years. For every 100 females, there were 99.1 males. For every 100 females age 18 and over, there were 93.0 males.

The median income for a household in the town was $32,577, and the median income for a family was $36,518. Men had a median income of $33,750 versus $20,243 for Women. The per capita income for the town was $11,918. About 13.9% of families and 15.0% of the population were below the poverty line, including 18.2% of those under age 18 and 8.8% of those age 65 or over.

== Education ==
Taylor is a part of the Snowflake Unified School District.

Two schools, Taylor Elementary School and Taylor Intermediate School, are located in Taylor.

Snowflake Junior High School and Snowflake High School, in Snowflake, serve Taylor.

== See also ==
- The Church of Jesus Christ of Latter-day Saints in Arizona
