= Jack Cole (choreographer) =

American choreographer (1911–1974)

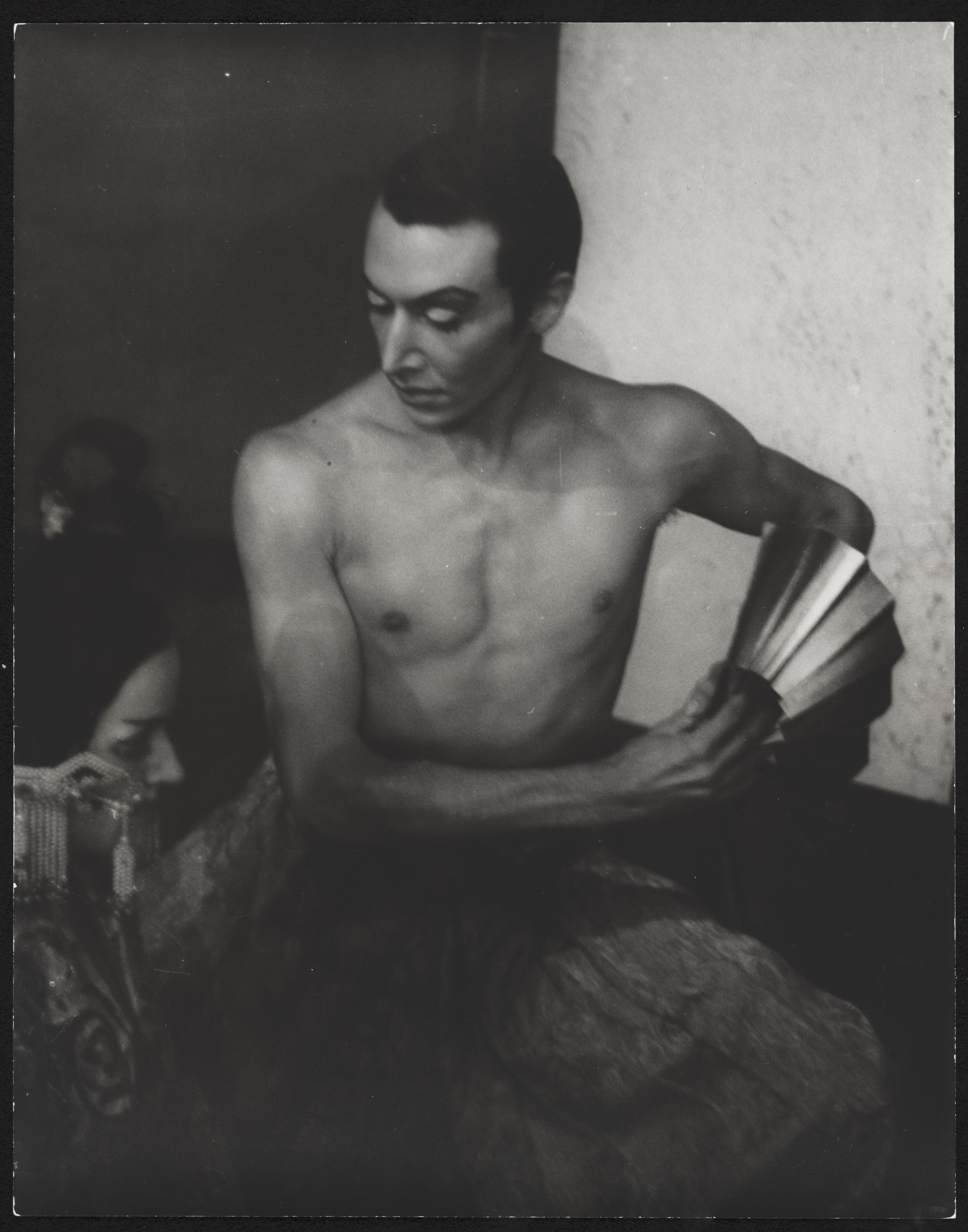
- Jack Cole with Virginia Miller
- Born: John Ewing Richter; April 27, 1911; New Brunswick, New Jersey, U.S.
- Died: February 17, 1974 (aged 62); Los Angeles, California, U.S.
- Occupations: choreographer; dancer

Jack Cole (born John Ewing Richter; April 27, 1911 – February 17, 1974) was an American dancer, choreographer, and theatre director known as "the Father of Theatrical Jazz Dance" for his role in codifying African-American jazz dance styles, as influenced by the dance traditions of other cultures, for Broadway and Hollywood. Asked to describe his style he described it as "urban folk dance".

His work as a dancer and choreographer began in the 1930s and lasted until the mid-1960s. Beginning in modern dance, he worked in nightclubs, on the Broadway stage, and in Hollywood films, ending his career as a teacher. He was an innovative choreographer for the camera and a hugely influential choreographer and teacher, training Gwen Verdon, Carol Haney, and Buzz Miller, among many others, and influencing later choreographers, such as Bob Fosse, Jerome Robbins, and Alvin Ailey, all of whom drew heavily from his innovations.

== Early life ==
Born as John Ewing Richter to a working-class family in New Brunswick, New Jersey in 1911, he later adopted his stepfather's surname, along with the nickname he was known by, to become Jack Cole. Cole attended Columbia University for a time, but dropped out in 1930 after seeing a performance by Ruth St. Denis and Ted Shawn, founders of the Denishawn School of Dancing and Related Arts.

== Formal training and influences ==
Once Cole left Columbia he joined St. Denis' and Shawn's school and dance company. He was entranced by the Asian influences they used in their choreography and costuming, although he was unimpressed by the surface-level imitation of eastern dance traditions St. Denis put forth.

His fascination with Asian dance inspired him, however, to incorporate more authentic elements of other cultures' dance traditions into his work through studying a number of foreign dance forms. Cole became well-versed in bharata nāṭyam, India's oldest dance technique, first by studying with dancers Uday Shankar and La Meri and later by sharing rehearsal space with Bhaskar Roy Chowdhury. Cole used the crisp arm movements and other features of classical South Asian dance he acquired through his studies throughout his career, both in those numbers in movies such as Kismet that explicitly evoked exotic Asian themes and in performances as far removed from them as "Diamonds Are a Girl's Best Friend" by Marilyn Monroe in Gentlemen Prefer Blondes.

Cole also paid particularly close attention to the dances that African-Americans were inventing in the dance halls of the twenties and thirties, such as the Camel Walk, the Charleston, and the Lindy Hop. As Cole once wrote, "Whatever is danced in the name of jazz dancing must come from the Lindy, necessarily theatricalized and broadened for the stage, of course." He also drew inspiration from professional African-American dancers such as the Nicholas Brothers and the Berry Brothers, who featured the high-flying splits and acrobatic knee slides that Cole later made a hallmark of his choreography.

During the 1930s his interests expanded to Latin American and Afro-Caribbean dances. The large Cuban migration to New York in the late 1940s brought the mambo, rumba, and cha-cha-cha to the dance halls, and Cole drew from these vocabularies as well. He also studied Flamenco with Paco Cansino, film star Rita Hayworth's uncle.

Cole also studied classical ballet with Luigi Albertieri, the adopted son and student of Enrico Cecchetti, while he was still part of the modern dance movement. Cole was introduced to the Cecchetti ballet technique, a rigorous training program that established the model of standardised teaching which is the basis of all professional ballet teaching today. He later incorporated the Cecchetti method in his teaching.

Cole's career trajectory was unique for an American dance artist. He started at the very roots of modern dance, then segued into a commercial career in nightclubs across the nation, first at Manhattan's Embassy Club, then opening the Rainbow Room on its inaugural evening in October 1934. His career spanned three major arenas: nightclub, Broadway stage, and Hollywood film. He ended his career as a popular coach to Hollywood stars and an innovative choreographer for the camera.

== Professional career ==
=== Modern Dance ===
Cole made his professional dance debut at Lewisohn Stadium at the City College of New York with the Denishawn Dancers, led by St. Denis and Shawn, in August 1930, only six weeks after beginning his training with them. After that dance company collapsed in 1931 because of personal differences between Shawn and St. Denis, Cole became a member of Shawn's new troupe, "Ted Shawn and His Men Dancers", and helped Shawn found the renowned summer dance hub, Jacob's Pillow, in 1931.

He later studied and performed with the pioneering modernists Doris Humphrey and Charles Weidman, who had earlier managed the Denishawn school's New York City operations before leaving to form their own troupe. Cole was still barely getting by, sleeping in Humphrey and Weidman's studio as well as taking classes there.

=== Nightclubs ===
Cole's career as a dance artist then took a unique trajectory. Eager to make a living as a dancer during the Depression, he left the modern dance world in 1934 and opted for opportunities in nightclubs, initially partnering with Alice Dudley, another former Denishawn student.

He began his commercial dance career at Manhattan's Embassy Club, owned by Dutch Schultz, then opened the Rainbow Room on its inaugural evening in October 1934. For years he danced in a trio with Anna Austin, whom Cole had met while she was teaching South Asian dance, and Florence Lessing, one of Austin's students, who met Cole in one of Paco Cansino's classes.

Cole's early nightclub acts, such as Dance for a Pack of Hungry Cannibals, Japanese Lanterns, and Love Dance, combined the exoticism of Denishawn with jazz. In Swing Impressions of an East Indian Play Dance Cole used the mudras and other features of the classical Indian lexicon to create intricate routines, which he set to big band swing arrangements to create a style the press called "Hindu Swing".

Cole went in a different direction in 1939, forming "Ballet Intime" with dancers Ernestine Day, Letitia Ide, Fe Alf, George Bockman, and Eleanor King. They adapted the rumba to Cole Porter's Begin the Beguine in West Indian Impressions while using the characteristic arched stance and rapid-tapping heels of flamenco dance in Babalu. In 1942 he focused on African-American themes in Wedding of a Solid Sender, Reefer Man, and Reefer Joint, 4:00 A.M. Yet even though his dances now referred overtly to American and Latin cultures rather than Asian ones he continued to use the sharp dynamics and clarity of line characteristic of bharata nāṭyam.

After moving to Hollywood in the early 1940s, Cole returned to nightclubs at the end of the decade when a studio strike left him free to take his troupe of Columbia Pictures dancers, which included Florence Lessing, Rod Alexander, Carol Haney, Buzz Miller, and Gwen Verdon, to Chez Paree in Chicago in 1947. Several months later the group, now known as "Jack Cole and His Company", played the Latin Quarter in New York City, offering a suite of East Indian dances, a jitterbug-inspired dance to Benny Goodman's Sing, Sing, Sing, followed by a jazz arrangement for six dancers, and ending with a suite of Latin American dances to a Latin-swing arrangement.

The mix of styles went beyond the eclectic list of dances: Cole's choreography for Sing, Sing, Sing, for example, had its roots in African-American vernacular dance, but was also "informed by East Indian, Latin American, and Caribbean musical traditions and dance forms, as well as by the modern American dance traditions of Denishawn and Humphrey-Weidman". At the same time, works such as Sing, Sing, Sing celebrated jazz dance styles, such as the Lindy, that were changing radically with the switch from swing to bebop, as dancers created "a 'modern' style of jazz dance in which rhythms, previously reserved for the feet, were absorbed and reshaped in the body". Cole followed their lead, while adding innovations of his own.

=== Broadway ===
Cole had begun his Broadway career as a performer in 1933 in the two-act ballet, The Dream of Sganarelle, which Humphrey and Weidman choreographed and danced in. He had a few Broadway roles over the next decade, the most prominent being "The Groom" in The Wedding of a Solid Sender and the lead in the Hindu Serenade segment, both featured in the Ziegfeld Follies of 1943.

His first Broadway credit as a choreographer was Something for the Boys in 1943, starring Ethel Merman with music and lyrics by Cole Porter and Dorothy Fields. Cole remained active on Broadway throughout the 1940s and 1950s, maintaining a Manhattan pied-à-terre even while working in Hollywood, and choreographing the Broadway musical Kismet in 1953.

Cole returned to New York and Broadway after his film career ended in 1960. His first two productions, Donnybrook! and Kean, which he directed as well as choreographed, were both flops, but he followed them by choreographing A Funny Thing Happened on the Way to the Forum in 1962 and Man of La Mancha in 1965.

=== Hollywood ===
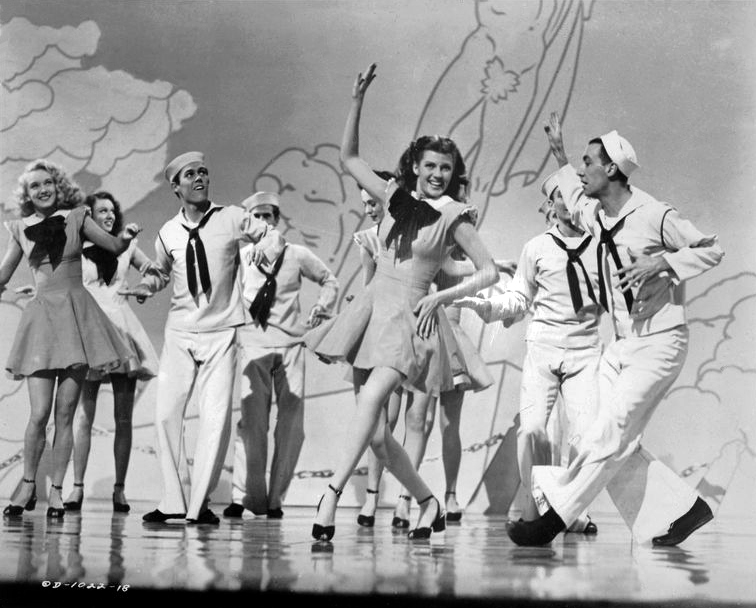

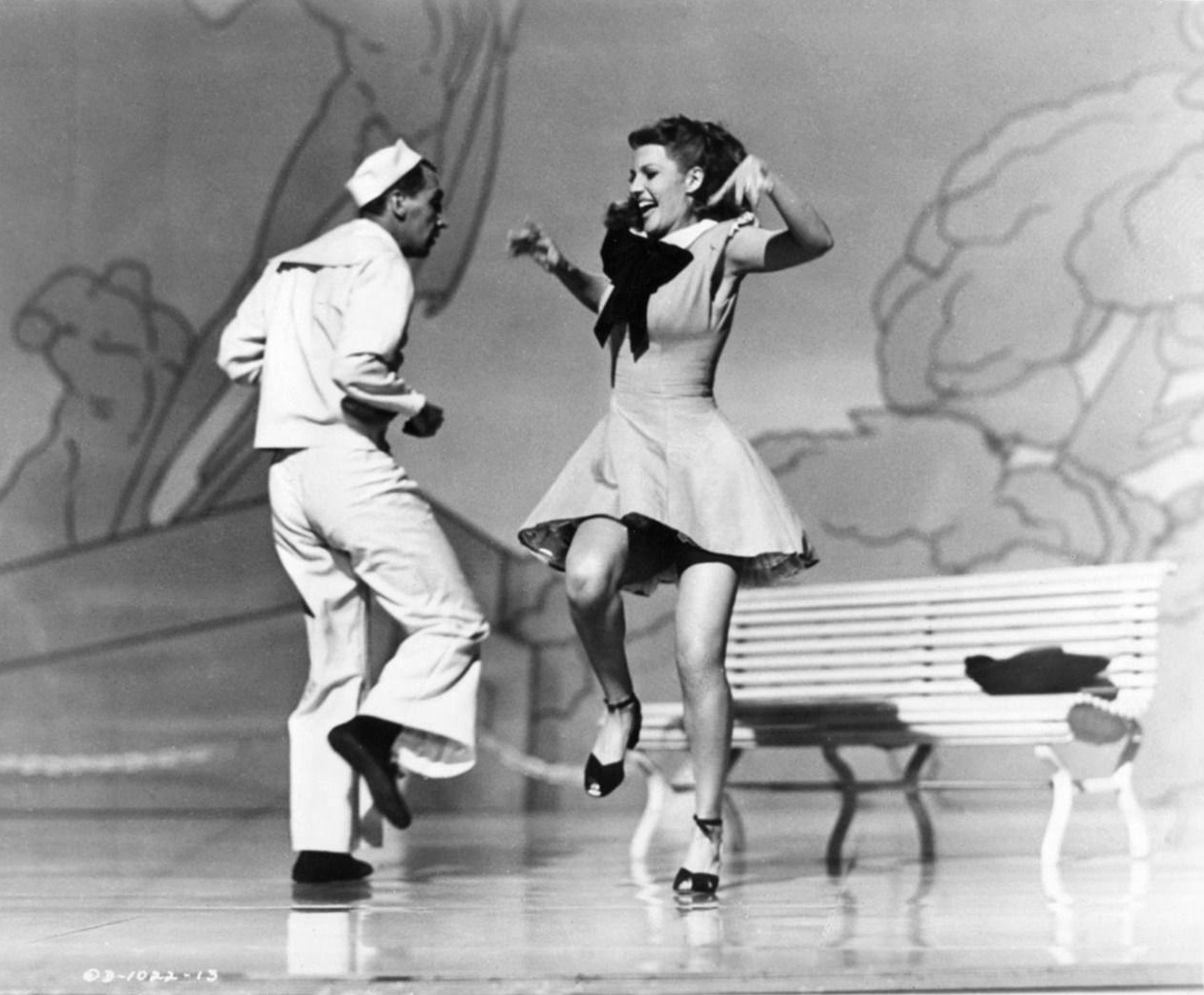
Cole and Rita Hayworth in Tonight and Every Night (1945)

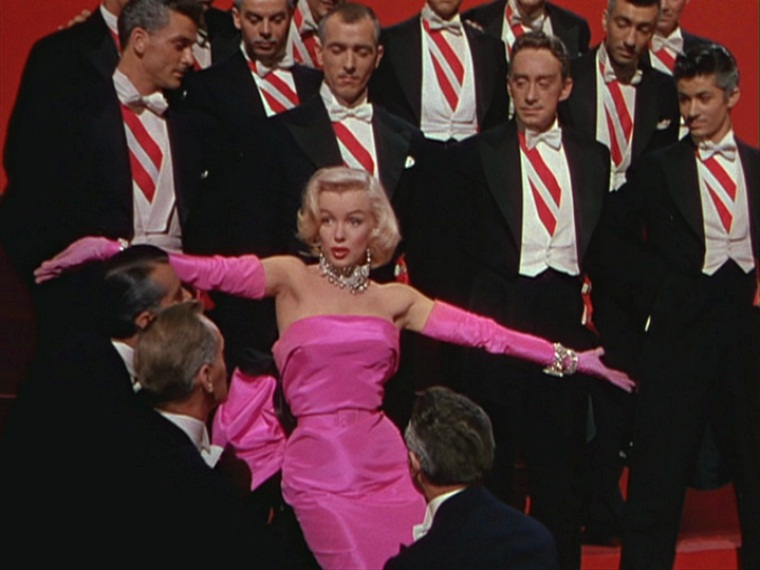
Cole choreographed the "Diamonds are a Girl's Best Friend" sequence in Gentlemen Prefer Blondes (1953)

.

Cole first came to Los Angeles in 1940 when offered a nightclub gig at Ciro's. Cole was hired to provide a specialty dance for the 20th Century Fox film, Moon Over Miami (1941), choreographed by Hermes Pan. His performance was cut, however, as he showed "a little bit too much pelvis and too much bare chest—just too much male sensuality" for the studio's taste.

Cole continued to push the boundaries of what the censors would allow throughout his career in Hollywood. He played with homoerotic images in both Betty Grable's number "No-Talent Joe" in Meet Me After the Show and "Ain't There Anyone Here For Love" sung by Jane Russell in Gentlemen Prefer Blondes, both of which featured scantily clad young men stoically ignoring those two bombshells. Censors also insisted on the removal of some of the lyrics and dance moves from the Cole Porter number "Ladies in Waiting" in Les Girls (1957), which nonetheless remains quite racy, even in redacted form.

Cole found Hollywood's approach to shooting dance sequences frustrating. Studios at that time typically regarded choreography, set design and costuming as distinct operations, often coming together for the first time on the first day of filming. Cole, by contrast, sought control over the design of the sets and his dancers' outfits.

He also chafed at the often static camera setups used to film dance numbers. In his Ladies in Waiting number the point of view jumped from the audience's view of the dancers to the dancers' view of the audience—with the stage lights blinding the dancers, as they often did—then jumped again to backstage. Later director/choreographers, such as Bob Fosse, used the same technique to great effect.

As Cole worked to establish his reputation in Hollywood he worked with established stars—Rita Hayworth, Betty Grable, Ann Miller, and Jane Russell—and with one actress on the verge of stardom—Marilyn Monroe. He built up their film personas through his choreography.

Cole led the supremely talented Hayworth to give a tour de force performance in "Put the Blame on Mame" in Gilda. As Cole noted, years later, "I must say of all the things I ever did for movies, that's one of the few I can really look at on the screen right now and say: If you want to see a beautiful, erotic woman, this is it. It still remains first class, it could be done right now."

Seven years after Gilda Cole not only choreographed, but directed Monroe in "Diamonds Are a Girl's Best Friend" in Gentlemen Prefer Blondes. Ever the perfectionist, Cole dictated nearly every aspect of her performance, from the camera setups and the lyrics to her gestures and phrasing, turning the original Broadway version, which Cole considered "square", into something far more swinging and sensual. Cole relied on the technique he learned in his years studying bharata nāṭyam, and had integrated with swing in his nightclub performances, to lead Monroe through small, sharp changes of direction as she performed her refined bump and grind.

Monroe's performance established her persona in her later musical and comedy roles. Although Monroe was acquiring a reputation for being difficult and undisciplined, she responded positively to Cole's controlling style on this shoot and insisted on language in her next contract with 20th Century-Fox that required that he be hired to choreograph her in any movie in which she was called on to dance. They worked together on five more films and remained close friends even after their working relationship ended.

Their last film, Let's Make Love, which was also Monroe's last musical comedy role, was less harmonious, as Monroe was chronically late for rehearsals, if she appeared at all, and less focused. This was also Cole's last film, as movie musicals had become less popular and profitable by the end of the 1950s and musical tastes changed. Cole returned once more to Broadway.

=== Television ===
Cole brought his dance groups to television throughout the 1950s, appearing in Bob Hope specials as well as The Perry Como Show (1948–50 and 1955–59 seasons) and Sid Caesar's Your Show of Shows (1950–54).

=== Teaching ===
When Cole started work at Columbia Pictures in 1944, he assembled his own company of dancers whom he trained in the style he sometimes called "jazz-ethnic-ballet" through daily classes on the Columbia lot. Cole drilled his students in classical ballet technique using the Cecchetti method, as well as flamenco, ethnic and modern dance, and gymnastics, and brought in Uday Shankar to instruct them in the techniques of bharata nāṭyam during the six to nine months that preceded actual rehearsals for a film. Among his students were Gwen Verdon and Carol Haney, both of whom achieved even greater renown working with Bob Fosse.

Cole continued teaching for the rest of his life, both in his role as choreographer in nightclubs and on Broadway and in Hollywood, and later at Jacob's Pillow and at the University of California, Los Angeles, where he had been teaching for two years before his death in 1974.

Cole was a perfectionist, who demanded the same of his students and those he was working with. As Chita Rivera recalled "He dictated every last detail of how he wanted you to twist an arm or the exact shape you needed with your hands. I remember once he worked with us for hours on how a particular handclap should sound."

Cole could also be abusive; as he told Dance Magazine in 1968, "Sometimes you have to slap them. Sometimes you have to kiss them." He cursed at nearly everyone, even his long-term friends and collaborators, and once dragged a student by her hair across the rehearsal room floor and threatened to toss another out a second-story window.

He gained a following of students and collaborators. He was patient, as he was with Jane Russell and Marilyn Monroe while filming "Diamonds Are a Girl's Best Friend".[14] Without Cole, it is unlikely Gwen Verdon would have achieved fame as a dancer; without his instruction, many stage and screen actresses might not be remembered as dancers today.[20] However, Cole did not attain the same level of recognition as Fosse and Robbins.

== Legacy ==
Cole virtually invented the idiom of American show dancing known as "theatrical jazz dance." He developed a mode of jazz-ethnic-ballet that prevails as the dominant dancing style in today's musicals, films, nightclub revues, television commercials and music videos. According to Martin Gottfried, Cole "won a place in choreographic history for developing the basic vocabulary of jazz dancing—the kind of dancing done in nightclubs and Broadway musicals".

Cole-style dancing is acrobatic and angular, using small groups of dancers rather than a large company; it is closer to the glittering nightclub floor show than to the ballet stage. His style required a great deal of concentration; as Florence Lessing, one of his earliest partners, observed "So many parts of the body, so many muscles moving in opposition to each other, and each in isolation from the other!" Cole derived many of his isolations from bharata nāṭyam, and used them to show rhythmic flow throughout the body, just as African-American dancers did after swing gave way to bop.

Cole's dancing was often described as "animalistic" or "cat-like", referring to the smooth transition of weight from foot to foot, while maintaining his torso erect. Cole's style also featured a great deal of coiled energy; as Village Voice dance critic Debra Jowitt wrote, "Cole dancing strikes me as immensely aggressive; almost every gesture is delivered with maximum force, but then has to be stopped cold in mid-air to achieve the clarity of design he wanted...an immense counter effort has to be used to stop the gesture."

Cole generally insisted that dancers maintain a cool, cold facial expression, but demanded that they nonetheless invest every movement with meaning and emotion:

"In the theatre you want to see real people doing real things, expressing valid emotions in an artistic, meaningful way, disclosing bits of insight that will transfix you and make you understand something about life, and about yourself....I just try to touch the dancer at the center of his emotion. I try to remind him of what he is—a dancer, and actor, a real person. If you're ashamed of this or that emotion, you can't dance. You yourself may not behave a certain way as a person, but when you dance you must bring real emotion to whatever you're doing. Isn't that what dancing is about—emotion, life—and not just patterns in the air?"

Cole's style was widely influential; as Agnes de Mille once said, many choreographers, including herself, Fosse, and Robbins, "all stole from Jack Cole". Cole's unmistakable style endures in the work of Gwen Verdon, Bob Fosse, Jerome Robbins, Gower Champion, Peter Gennaro, Michael Bennett, Tommy Tune, Patsy Swayze, Alvin Ailey (who was a dancer in Cole's Broadway musical Jamaica), and countless other dancers and choreographers including Wayne Lamb. Verdon, who was Cole's assistant for seven years, said that "Jack influenced all the choreographers in the theater from Jerome Robbins, Michael Kidd, Bob Fosse down to Michael Bennett and Ron Field today. When you see dancing on television, that's Jack Cole."

After the disbanding of Denishawn Dance, Cole's continued working relationship with Ted Shawn placed him in the small group of dancers that helped Shawn found the renowned summer dance hub, Jacob's Pillow. 79 years later, Jacob's Pillow faculty member Chet Walker, best known for performing in Bob Fosse musicals and his later creation of the tribute musical Fosse, also conceived a Jack Cole tribute musical titled Heat Wave: The Jack Cole Project, given its world premiere in May 2012 at Queens Theatre in New York's Flushing Meadows Corona Park.

Some critics challenge Cole's fixation, as a white Catholic man, on exotic ethnic dance traditions. Dance historian Constance Valis Hill allows that the elements of ethnic dance he pulled from were either "absorbed, borrowed, or appropriated." Regardless, she says, Cole honors the aesthetics of the cultural dances he uses by weaving them into works without altering their shapes or rhythms; a critic of Indian dance likewise wrote in 1945 that Cole "[performed] authentic Indian dance technique to swing tempos without losing the general dignity of the art." And, as a more recent appreciation notes, Cole studied bharata nāṭyam intensively, but did not present his dancing as authentic recreations of classic Indian dance, unlike others, such as St. Denis, who had a more superficial understanding of the tradition, but presented their work as authentic.

== Broadway productions ==
Year	Title	Role	Notes
1933	The Dream of Sganarelle	Olympian	Ballet
1934	Caviar	Sailor	Musical comedy
1934	Thumbs Up!	Himself	Musical revue
1935	May Wine	Dancer	Musical
1942	Keep 'em Laughing	Himself	Vaudeville
1943	Something for the Boys	Choreographer	Musical comedy
1943	Ziegfeld Follies of 1943	The Groom (The Wedding of a Solid Sender) Dancer (Hindu Serenade)	Musical comedy
1944	Allah Be Praised!	Choreographer	Musical comedy
1948	Magdalena: a Musical Adventure	Choreographer	Musical comedy
1950	Alive and Kicking	Choreographer	Musical revue
1953	Kismet	Choreographer	Musical
1957	Jamaica	Choreographer	Musical
1961	Donnybrook!	Director and Choreographer	Musical comedy
1961	Kean	Director and Choreographer	Musical comedy
1962	A Funny Thing Happened on the Way to the Forum	Choreographer	Musical comedy
1963	Zenda	Choreographer	Broadway opening cancelled
1964	Foxy	Choreographer	Musical comedy
1965	Man of La Mancha	Choreographer	Musical drama

== Film career ==
Year	Title	Role	Notes
1941	Moon Over Miami	Leader of Jack Cole Dancers	Musical (scenes cut)
1944	Kismet	Choreographer (uncredited)	Drama
1944	Cover Girl	Choreographer (uncredited)	Musical romantic comedy
1945	Tonight and Every Night	Choreographer and Dancer	Musical
1945	Eadie Was a Lady	Choreographer and Specialty dancer (uncredited)	Musical comedy
1945	Tars and Spars	Choreographer (uncredited)	Musical romantic comedy
1946	Meet Me on Broadway	Choreographer (uncredited)	Comedy
1946	Gilda	Choreographer (uncredited)	Film noir
1946	The Thrill of Brazil	Dance director (uncredited)	Musical
1946	The Jolson Story	Choreographer	Musical Biopic
1947	Down to Earth	Dances stager	Musical comedy
1951	On the Riviera	Dances stager	Musical comedy
1951	David and Bathsheba	Choreographer	Historical epic
1951	Meet Me After the Show	Dances stager	Musical
1952	The Merry Widow	Specialty dance choreographer (uncredited)	Operetta
1952	Lydia Bailey	Dancer (uncredited) and Dance sequence stager	Historical adventure
1953	The I Don't Care Girl	Choreographer	Musical Biopic
1953	Lili	Dance coach for Mel Ferrer	Musical drama
1953	The Farmer Takes a Wife	Choreographer	Musical comedy
1953	Gentlemen Prefer Blondes	Choreographer	Musical comedy
1954	River of No Return	Choreographer	Western
1954	There's No Business Like Show Business	Choreographer (uncredited)	Musical comedy-drama
1955	Three for the Show	Choreographer	Musical comedy
1955	Gentlemen Marry Brunettes	Choreographer	Musical romantic comedy
1955	Kismet	Choreographer, musical numbers staged by (uncredited)	Musical comedy
1957	Les Girls	Choreographer	Musical comedy
1957	Designing Woman	Randy Owens & Stager of musical numbers and dances	Romantic comedy
1959	Some Like It Hot	Choreographer (uncredited)	Comedy
1960	Let's Make Love	Choreographer	Musical comedy

== See also ==
- List of dancers
