= Kathleen Flake =

American historian

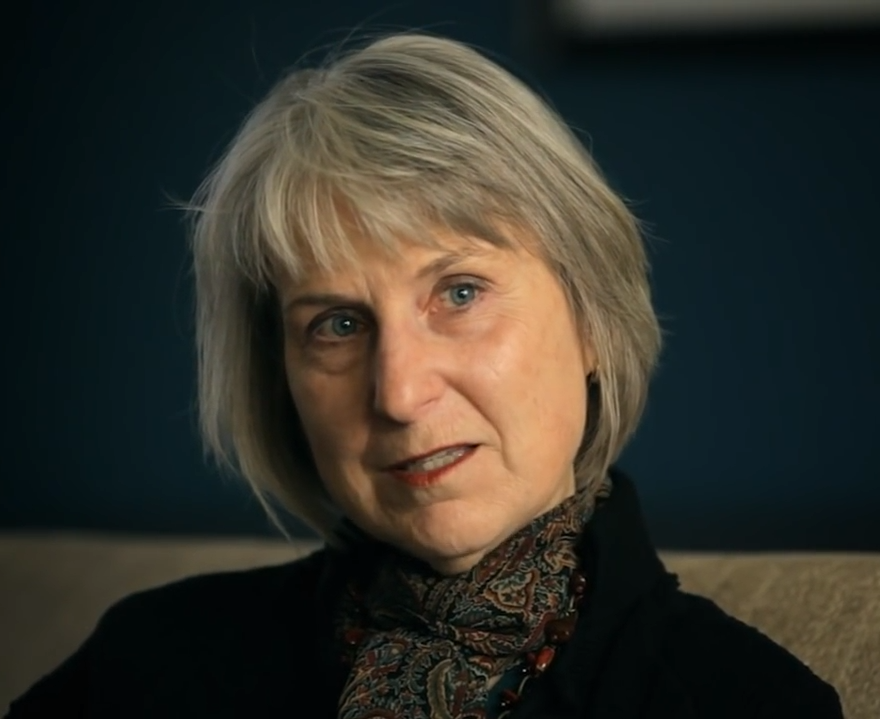
- Kathleen Flake in 2016

Academic background
- Education: Brigham Young University, Catholic University of America, University of Utah, University of Chicago

Academic work
- Institutions: University of Virginia
- Main interests: History of Mormonism
- Notable works: The Politics of Religious Identity

Kathleen Flake is an American historian, writer, and attorney. She was the inaugural Richard Lyman Bushman chair of Mormon studies at the University of Virginia from 2013 until her retirement in 2024.

== Education ==
Flake obtained a bachelor's degree from Brigham Young University, a master's degree from Catholic University of America, a JD from the University of Utah College of Law, and a PhD from the University of Chicago.

== Career ==
Flake was previously a professor of American religious history at the Divinity School and Graduate Department of Religion at Vanderbilt University. While a graduate student, Flake took a summer seminar course for graduate students on Mormon history with Richard L. Bushman.

Flake's research in the area of American religious history focuses on the adaptive strategies of nineteenth- and twentieth-century American religious communities and the effect of pluralism on religious identity. She also studies constructive function of text and ritual in maintaining and adapting the identity and gendered power structures of religious communities. Flake studies the influence of American law on American religion and the theological tensions inherent in the First Amendment religious clauses.

== Personal life ==
Flake is a member of the Church of Jesus Christ of Latter-day Saints and served a mission in Japan. She is a distant relative of former U.S. Senator Jeff Flake of Arizona; they share a great-grandfather, William J. Flake.

She lives in Charlottesville, Virginia.

== Works ==
Books

- Flake, Kathleen (2004). The Politics of Religious Identity: the Seating of Senator Reed Smoot, Mormon Apostle. Chapel Hill: University of North Carolina Press. ISBN 9780807863541. OCLC 57707347. Archived from the original on 2013-10-21.

Book chapters

- Flake, Kathleen (2004). "Utah and Idaho: The Mormon Corridor". In Shipps, Jan; Silk, Mark; Flake, Kathleen (eds.). Religion and Public Life in the Mountain West: Sacred Landscapes in Transition. Religion by Region, 2. Walnut Creek, California: AltaMira Press. ISBN 9780759106260. OCLC 466532351.
- —— (2010). The Emotional and Priestly Logic of Plural Marriage. Leonard J. Arrington Mormon History Lecture Series. Logan, Utah: Utah State University Press. ISBN 9780874218039. OCLC 659861322.
- —— (2011). "An Enduring Contest: American Christianities and the State". In Brekus, Catherine A.; Gilpin, W. Clark (eds.). American Christianities. Chapel Hill: University of North Carolina. ISBN 9780807835159. OCLC 711043246.

Journal articles

- Flake, Kathleen (October 1989). "Bearing the Weight". Sunstone. 13 (5). OCLC 367219902.
- —— (April 1991). "Beholding as in a Glass the Glory". Sunstone. 15 (1). OCLC 367241662.
- —— (July 1993). "Supping with the Lord: a liturgical theology of the LDS sacrament". Sunstone. 16 (5). OCLC 367478682.
- —— (December 1994). "Rendering to the corporation: a personal ecclesiology" (PDF). Sunstone. 17 (3). OCLC 367486153. Archived from the original (PDF) on 2014-10-23.
- —— (Summer 1995). "'Not to be Riten': The Nature and Effects of the Mormon Temple Rite as Oral Canon". Journal of Ritual Studies. 9 (2).
- —— (Winter 2003). "Re-placing Memory: Latter-day Saint Use of Historical Monuments and Narrative in the Early Twentieth Century". Religion and American Culture: A Journal of Interpretation. 13 (1): 69–109. doi:10.1525/rac.2003.13.1.69. OCLC 4893739640. S2CID 56393456.
- —— (2007). "Translating Time: The Nature and Function of Joseph Smith's Narrative Canon". The Journal of Religion. 87 (4). Chicago: University of Chicago Press: 497–527. doi:10.1086/519770. OCLC 174502169. S2CID 55042573.
- —— (December 2010). "Protecting the Wilderness: Comments on Howe's The Garden in the Wilderness". Church History: Studies in Christianity and Culture. 79 (4). OCLC 4893096876.
- —— (2012). "Joseph Smith's Letter from Liberty Jail: A Study in Canonization". The Journal of Religion. 92 (4): 515–526. doi:10.1086/666836. OCLC 5075294142. S2CID 159506510.
- Flake, Kathleen (August 22, 2012). "The Bible plus". The Christian Century. 129 (17).
