= William J. Flake =

American businessman (1839–1932)

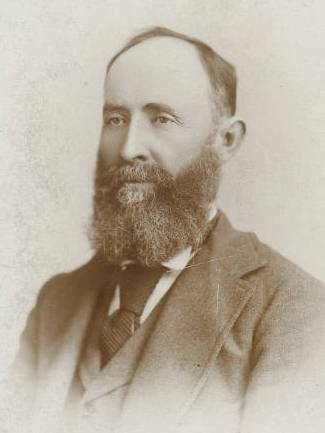
- Flake in c. 1890
- Born: William Jordan Flake; July 3, 1839; Anson County, North Carolina, U.S.
- Died: August 10, 1932 (aged 93); Snowflake, Arizona, U.S.

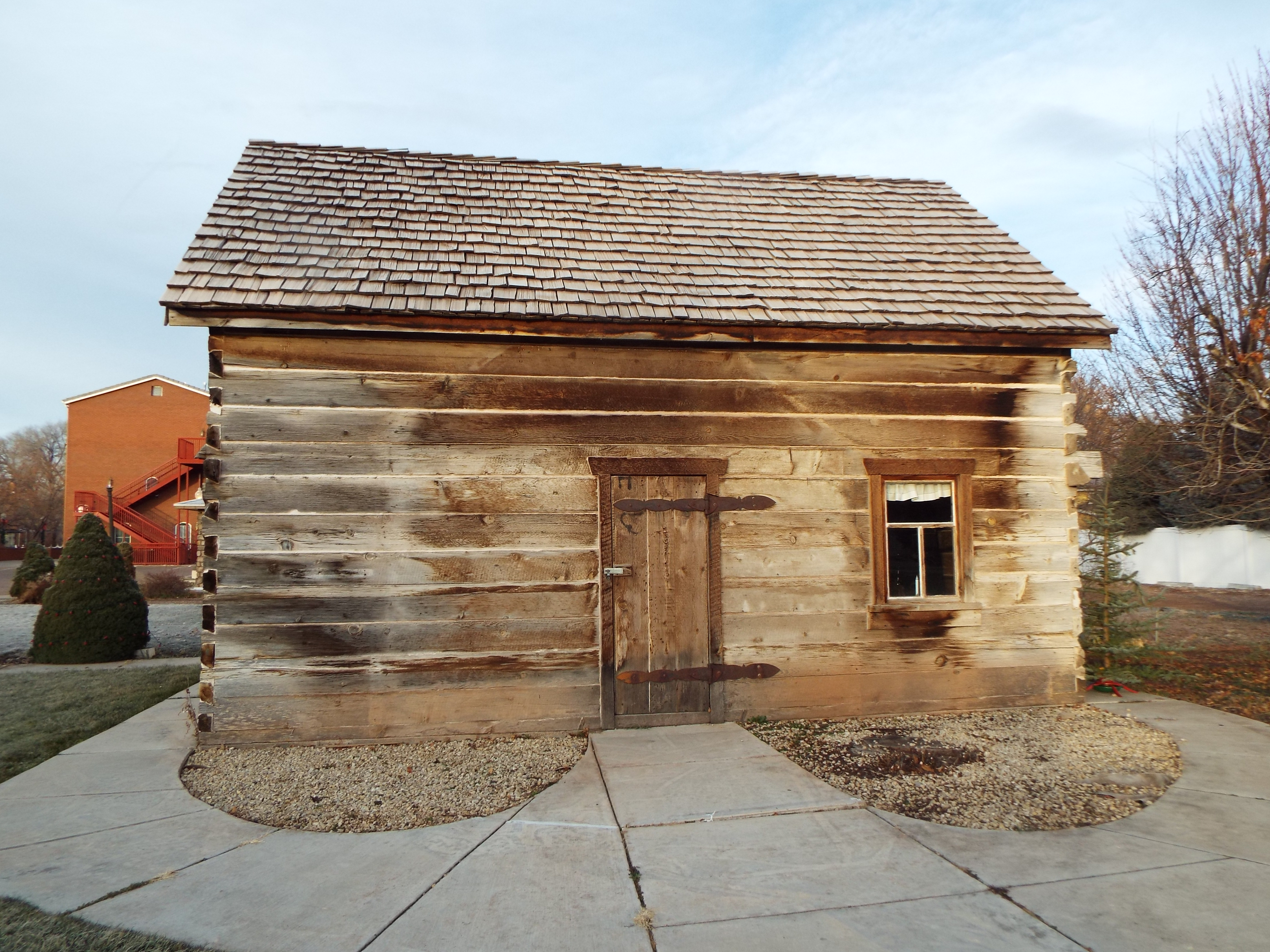
William Jordan Flake Cabin built in 1858 and now located on Stinson and Hunt Sts. in Snowflake, Az.

William Jordan Flake (July 3, 1839 – August 10, 1932) was a prominent member of the Church of Jesus Christ of Latter-day Saints, who helped settle parts of Arizona, and was imprisoned at the Yuma Territorial Prison for polygamy.

== Life and career ==
Flake was born in Anson County, North Carolina, the fourth son of Agnes Love and James Madison Flake. When he was three, his family moved to Kemper County, Mississippi. In 1844, they became members of The Church of Jesus Christ of Latter-day Saints and moved to Nauvoo, Illinois. Flake and his family moved to the Salt Lake Valley in 1846 by wagon train with the Mormon pioneers, arriving in 1848. In 1849, his father was killed on the American River while examining a gold mining site for the church in California. His widowed mother took her three children to San Bernardino; she died in 1856. Flake and his siblings returned to Utah to live with Amasa Lyman and his family.

On December 30, 1858, William Flake married Lucy Hannah White; they were nineteen and sixteen years old respectively. A year later, they started a cattle ranch in Beaver County, Utah. Flake was called by church leaders to enter into a plural marriage in 1868. Lucy agreed to the marriage, because of her belief in the LDS Church; she even helped choose his second wife. William Flake and Prudence Kartchner were married in October 1868. Flake and Kartchner would have seven children.

In 1877, he was called by LDS Church President Brigham Young to start a settlement in the northern area of what was then the Arizona Territory. William left with a wagon train and herds of cattle for the Little Colorado River region of Arizona and arrived in January 1878. Despite much hardship after spending 13 months on the trail and a winter living in stables and wagons, the settlement survived. In the fall of 1878, Erastus Snow, an LDS Apostle, visited and joined with Flake naming the town Snowflake: "Snow for me and Flake for you."

On December 5, 1884, Flake was tried in Prescott, Arizona in the District Court and found guilty for practice of polygamy and unlawful cohabitation, a common charge used to prosecute LDS men under the Edmunds Act. Flake received a $500 fine and was imprisoned in the Yuma Territorial Prison for six months. While in prison, Flake still served as one of the counselors to the bishop of the Snowflake ward. Flake was treated humanely in prison, reportedly allowed to work how he pleased, read as much as he pleased, and eat "excellent food". He was released from prison on June 11, 1885. After he returned from prison, Prudence and Lucy became pregnant. Prudence gave birth to twins on June 7, 1886. They died at birth. Lucy gave birth on July 28, 1886; her child died a few months later from pneumonia.

Flake's plural wife Prudence died on February 8, 1896. During his marriage, Flake was often away from home, on the ranch and tending to livestock. His wife Lucy Flake died on January 27, 1900, at age fifty-seven. William Flake would never remarry. In 1901, Flake served in the Southern States mission. He also sponsored genealogical research and continued ranching.

In 1959, Flake was posthumously nominated and then inducted into the National Cowboy Hall of Fame in the Hall of Great Westerners for his contributions as a colonizer and cattleman as Arizona's fourth entry.

William Jordan Flake was the father of eleven sons and nine daughters and lived to the age of 93, dying on August 10, 1932, in Snowflake.

== Legacy ==
Flake's descendants include:

- (great-great-grandson) Jeff Flake, a former U.S. Senator (R-AZ) and former ambassador to Turkey
- (great-great-granddaughter) Kathleen Flake, a professor of American religious history at the University of Virginia
- (great-grandson, and Jeff Flake's uncle) Former Speaker of the Arizona House and later State Senator Jake Flake

In 1959, Flake was inducted into the Hall of Great Westerners of the National Cowboy & Western Heritage Museum.

Flake founded Snowflake, Arizona with Erastus Snow, and the town bears their names.

== See also ==
- Perry Owens
- Miles Park Romney
- The Church of Jesus Christ of Latter-day Saints in Arizona
- David King Udall
