= Buzz Miller =

American dancer (1923–1999)

- Born: Vernal Miller; December 23, 1923; Snowflake, Arizona, U.S.
- Died: February 23, 1999 (aged 75); Manhattan, New York City, New York, U.S.
- Occupation: Dancer

Vernal "Buzz" Miller (December 23, 1923 – February 23, 1999) was an American dancer who was equally at home on Broadway and in contemporary ballet and modern dance.

== Early life and Training ==
Vernal Miller, known from boyhood as Buzz, was born in Snowflake, Arizona, a small town in Navajo County founded by members of The Church of Jesus Christ of Latter-day Saints. Raised in a family with three brothers and two sisters, he was educated in local schools. After graduation from high school, he joined the U.S. Army and spent two years as a front lines messenger on active duty in World War II. He was honorably discharged from military service after being injured in combat. In 1947, when he was 23 years old, he began his dance studies with Mia Slavenska, a glamorous Croatian ballerina, in Hollywood, California. After only nine months of study, he got his first professional dancing job.

== Professional career ==
Once he began training, Miller soon showed an unusual talent for jazz dance and he quickly found employment as a professional dancer. He toured night clubs and cabarets in London and Paris with Kay Thompson and the Williams Brothers (1947) and in cities around the United States with the Jack Cole Dancers. Thereafter, he appeared in numerous Broadway shows and Hollywood films., demonstrating his facility for the quirky jazz-based choreography of Jack Cole and Bob Fosse.

=== Broadway Shows ===
- 1947 – Magdalena: A Musical Adventure. A Brazilian folk operetta with music by Heitor Villa-Lobos. Choreography by Jack Cole.
- 1952 – Two's Company. A musical revue with music by Vernon Duke and lyrics by Ogden Nash, starring Bette Davis. Choreography by Jerome Robbins. Miller had featured billing, along with Nora Kaye and Maria Karnilova.
- 1953 – Me and Juliet. A musical comedy by Richard Rodgers and Oscar Hammerstein, with dances and musical numbers arranged by Robert Alton. Miller was a principal dancer, partnering Joan McCracken in "Keep It Gay," a dance number in act 1.
- 1953 – Pal Joey. A revival of the 1940 musical by Richard Rodgers and Lorenz Hart. Choreography by Robert Alton. With Harold Lang, Helen Gallagher, Elaine Stritch, and Bob Fosse.
- 1954 – The Pajama Game. A musical with music and lyrics by Richard Adler and Jerry Ross, directed by George Abbott and Jerome Robbins. Choreography by Bob Fosse. The show was regularly stopped by applause for the dance number called "Steam Heat," performed by Buzz Miller, Carol Haney, and Peter Gennaro.
- 1956 – Bells Are Ringing. A musical with book and lyrics by Betty Comden and Adolph Green and music by Jule Styne. Directed and choreographed by Bob Fosse and Jerome Robbins. Starring Judy Holiday as a lovelorn telephone operator. Miller played her friend Carl and was her partner in "Mu-cha-cha," the dance number that opens act 2.
- 1959 – Redhead. A murder-mystery musical set in Victorian London, with music and lyrics by Albert Hague and Dorothy Fields, directed and choreographed by Bob Fosse and Donald MacKayle. Created especially for Gwen Verdon in the title role. As the Jailer, Miller was her partner in the dance number called "Pick-Pocket Tango."
- 1962 – Bravo Giovanni. A musical conceived as a vehicle for opera star Cesare Siepi. With music by Milton Schafer and choreography by Carol Haney and Buzz Miller. Miller danced with Maria Karnilova in a big production number called "The Kangaroo."
- 1963 – Hot Spot. A musical with music by Mary Rodgers and staging by Herbert Ross. A historic flop, in which Miller danced with Carmen de Lavallade.
- 1964 – Funny Girl. A blockbuster hit starring Barbra Streisand as comedienne Fanny Brice. Music by Jule Styne and lyrics by Rob Merrill. Choreography by Carol Haney and Jerome Robbins. Miller danced with Streisand and the chorus in "Cornet Man," act 1, scene 6.

=== Other performances ===
Miller reprised his dancing role in The Pajama Game in the Hollywood film made in 1957. Doris Day and John Raitt played the leading roles. Other films in which Miller appeared included On the Riviera (1951), There's No business Like Show Business (1954), Anything Goes (1956), and Justine (1969). Besides his work in films, he appeared on numerous American television shows, including Camera Three, The Ed Sullivan Show, and The Arthur Godfrey Show.

In 1955 and 1956 Miller was a guest artist with Roland Petit's Ballets de Paris, with a leading role opposite Zizi Jeanmaire in La Chambre, a detective-story ballet with a scenario by Georges Simenon, and a featured role in Les Belles Damnées, with Violette Verdy. He also danced in the first Festival dei Due Mondi (Festival of the Two Worlds) in Spoleto, Italy, in 1957, as a representative of contemporary American culture in the performing arts. In New York during the 1960s he was favored by the modern dance choreographer John Butler, who cast him in Portrait of Billie (1961), inspired by the life of Billie Holiday, and in Catulli Carmina (Songs of Catullus, 1964), in which he originated the role of Caelius and later danced the principal role of the Roman poet Catullus. In both these works he danced opposite the lissome and beautiful Carmen de Lavallade, another Butler favorite.

=== Choreography ===
In 1968, Miller choreographed and associate directed Julie Bovasso's The Moon Dreamers at La MaMa Experimental Theatre Club. He was then associate director for Bovasso's plays at La MaMa in 1971, 1974, and 1975. These included Schubert's Last Serenade and Monday on the Way to Mercury Island in 1971, The Nothing Kid and Standard Safety in 1974, and Schubert's Last Serenade, The Final Analysis, and The Super Lover in 1975.

== Later years ==
In 1978, Miller was a founding member and reconstructionist of the American Dance Machine, a company and briefly a school devoted to preserving the great dance numbers from Broadway and television shows. He was responsible for restaging Carol Haney's choreography for "Me and My Girl," first presented on The Ed Sullivan Show in 1962. He also taught master dance classes at many universities in the United States. He was regarded as one of the leading teachers of jazz dance in the country.

== Personal life ==
Openly gay for most of his life, Miller had a five-year liaison with Jerome Robbins in the 1950s. Thereafter, in 1957, he met Alan Groh and began a relationship that lasted for some thirty years, until Groh's death in 1996. Miller himself died of emphysema in Manhattan in 1999. He was 76 years old.

His archives and papers are held in the Jerome Robbins Dance Division of the New York Public Library for the Performing Arts at Lincoln Center.
