= Copperstate Farms =

Cannabis greenhouse in Snowflake, Arizona, U.S.

Coordinates: 34.518°N 110.106°W

- Company logo
- Interactive map of the Copperstate Farms area

General information
- Type: Cannabis greenhouse
- Location: Snowflake, Arizona, U.S.
- Owner: Fife Symington IV

Website
- copperstatefarms.com

Copperstate Farms is a cannabis greenhouse in Snowflake, Arizona, United States. It is the largest employer in Snowflake, the largest cannabis wholesaler in Arizona as of 2022, the largest cannabis greenhouse in the United States as of 2021, and the largest operation producing exclusively cannabis in North America at 2,000,000 square feet (190,000 m^{2}), around 40 acres under glass. The owner, Fife Symington IV is the son of Fife Symington, who was the state governor in the 1990s.
