= Snowflake Unified School District =

School district in Arizona, United States

Address
- 682 West School Bus Lane Snowflake, Arizona, 85937; United States

District information
- Type: Public
- Grades: PreK–12
- NCES District ID: 0407820

Students and staff
- Students: 2,542
- Teachers: 127.49
- Staff: 118.3
- Student–teacher ratio: 19.94

Other information
- Website: www.susd5.org

Snowflake Unified School District 5 is a school district in Navajo County, Arizona.

== Schools ==
The District includes the following schools:

- Snowflake High School (grades 9–12)
- Snowflake Junior High (grades 7 and 8)
- Snowflake Intermediate School (grades 4–6)
- Taylor Intermediate School (grades 4–6)
- Highland Primary School (grades K-3)
- Taylor Elementary School (grades K-3)
