= Heber–Overgaard, Arizona =

CDP in Navajo County, Arizona

- CDP
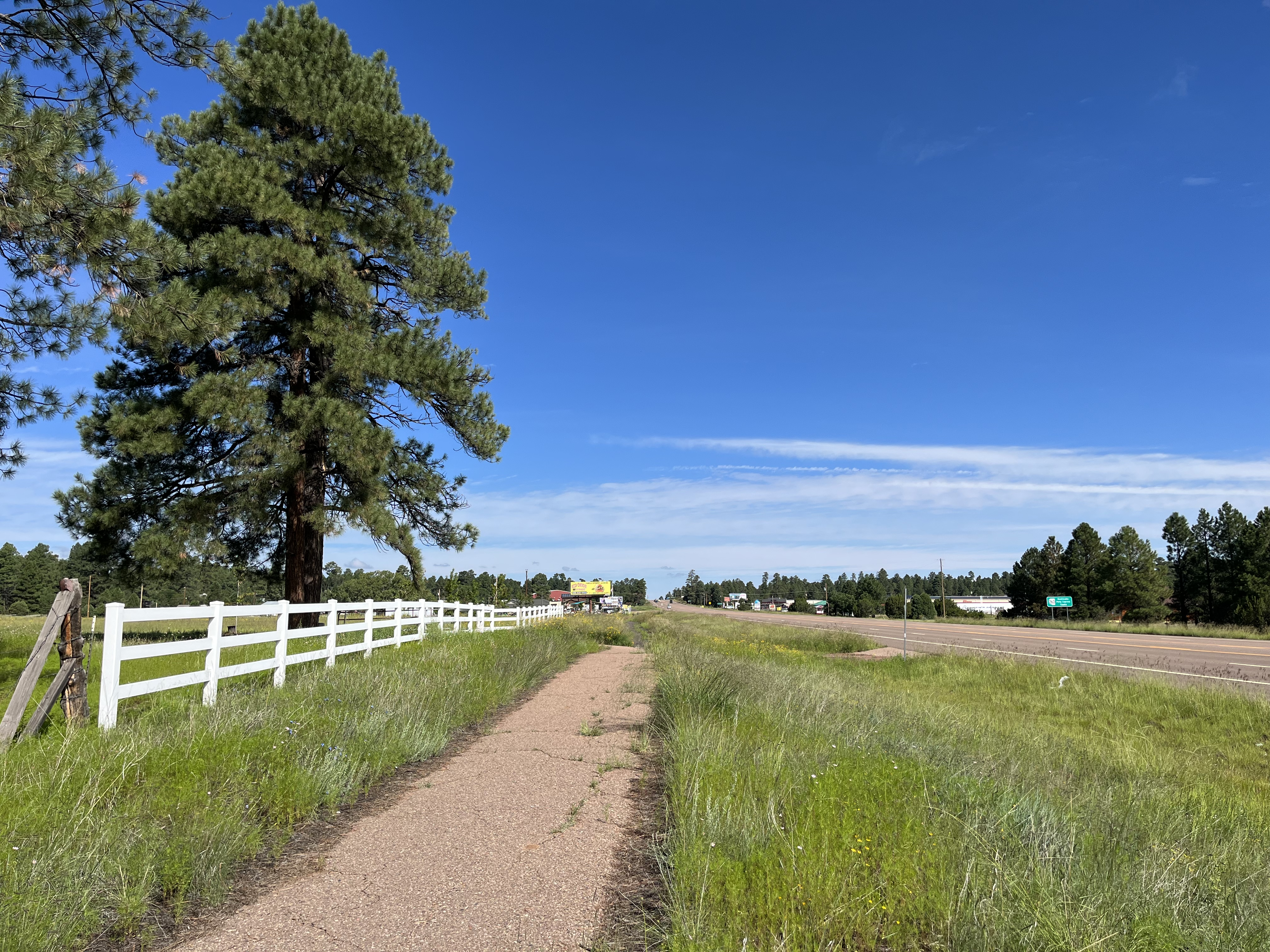
- Heber–Overgaard as viewed from SR260 at mile post 307
- Motto: "Always In Season"
- Location in Navajo County and the state of Arizona

- Location in Arizona Location in United States Location in North America
- Coordinates: 34°24′47″N 110°33′52″W
- Country: United States
- State: Arizona
- County: Navajo
- Settled: 1883
- Established: 1890

Government
  - Type: Unincorporated
  - Body: Navajo County Board of Supervisors

Area
  - Total: 6.86 sq mi (17.77 km^{2})
  - Land: 6.86 sq mi (17.77 km^{2})
  - Water: 0 sq mi (0.00 km^{2})
- Elevation: 6,627 ft (2,020 m)

Population (2020)
  - Total: 2,898
  - Density: 2,833.8/sq mi (1,094.14/km^{2})
- Demonyms: Heberite, Overgaardian
- Time zone: UTC−7 (MST (no DST))
- ZIP Codes: 85928, 85933
- Area code: 928
- FIPS code: 04-32310
- GNIS ID(s): 2408368
- Major airport: Mogollon Airpark
- Website: heberovergaard.org

Heber–Overgaard is a census-designated place (CDP) in Navajo County, Arizona, United States. Situated atop the Mogollon Rim, the community lies at an elevation of 6,627 feet (2,020 m). The population was 2,898 at the 2020 census. Heber and Overgaard are technically two unincorporated communities, but as of the 1990 census, their proximity led to the merged name of "Heber–Overgaard".

Heber was settled in 1883 by members of the Church of Jesus Christ of Latter-day Saints (LDS Church), and the town is named after either Heber J. Grant or Heber C. Kimball, both prominent members of the LDS church. Overgaard, adjoining Heber, was settled ca. 1936 and was named after the owner of the first sawmill, Kristen Kristensen (Chris) Overgaard.

Heber–Overgaard's early economy was founded on dry farming and ranching while tourism, retirement and timbering are the basis for present-day industry.

== History ==
=== Founding ===
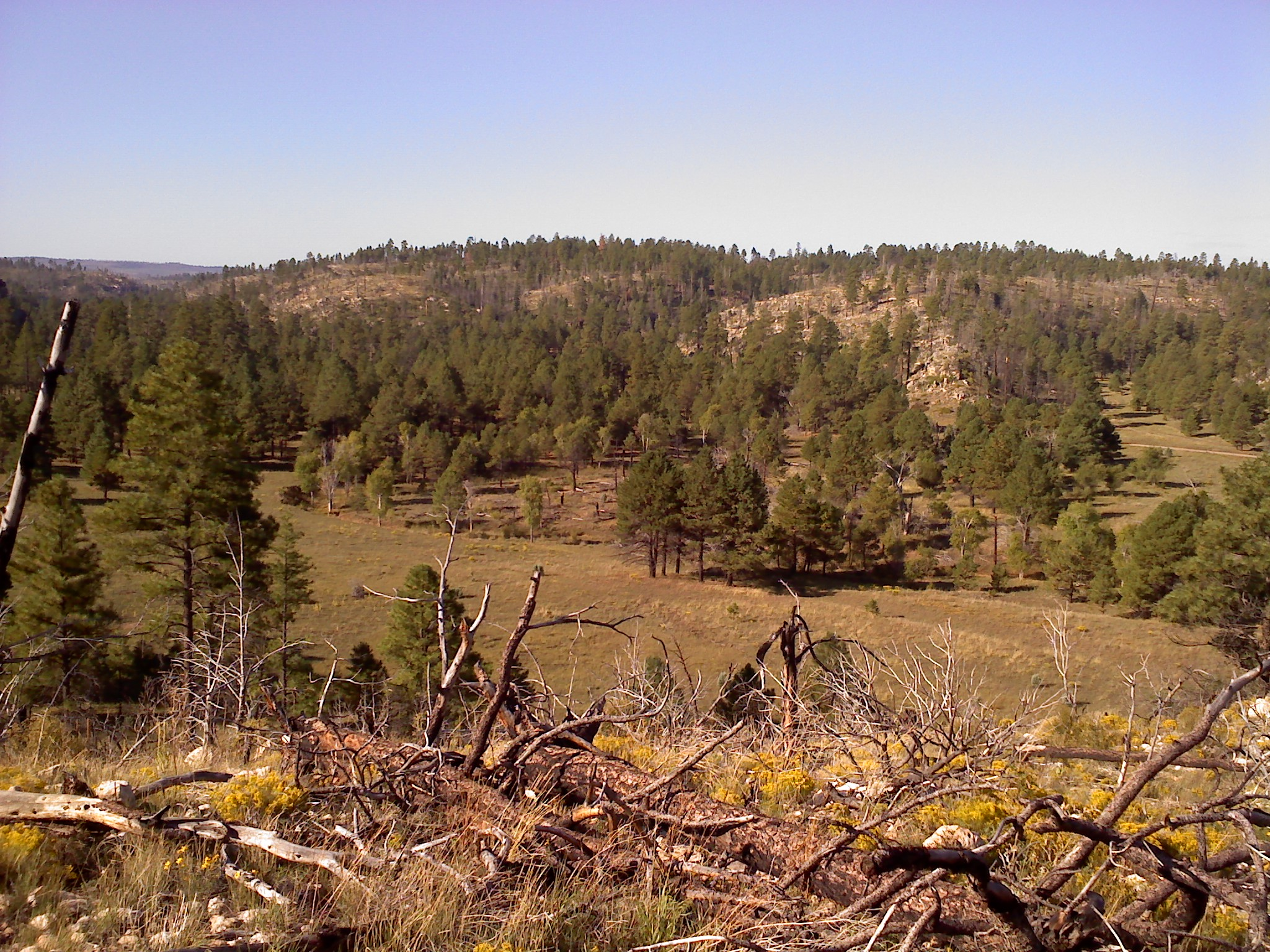
Black Canyon

In March 1873, Mormon pioneers from Utah were sent to the Little Colorado River area under the direction of Horton D. Height. In 1876, a large group of these settlers established four settlements on the Little Colorado River, which they named Brigham City, Sunset, Obed, and Allen's Camp (Joseph City). In Allen's Camp, a dam had been built on the Little Colorado River in April, but high waters in July washed it out. By August, many settlers had returned to Utah. Eight married couples and six single men were all that remained in Allen's Camp. By 1882, the Obed settlement had collapsed and both Brigham City and Sunset were near collapse due to several years of drought. John Bushman, of Allen's Camp, was sent by Lot Smith, then president of the Little Colorado Stake, to scout the forests to the south in anticipation of relocation. Dry farming in the forested mountains was thought to be easier due to higher rainfall, lush grasses, and plentiful timber.

On December 6, 1882, Bushman set out for the forest with five brethren: W.C. Allen, J.H. Richards, J.C. Hansen, H. Tanner, and J.E. Shelley. Upon arrival they began digging wells in search of water. They were later joined by Hans Nielson, Lehi Heward, and John Scarlet. By April 13, 1883, two cabins had been built and grain planted, but only four families remained (Heward, Scarlet, Nielson, and Shelley). Bushman never settled in the area, but he and his family contributed time and encouragement to the local settlers. The first summer, houses were built, land cleared, and corrals constructed. Crops were planted not only for food, but also to barter for goods that could not be made at home. The growing season was four months long.

In 1887, Heward abandoned the settlement and relocated to Pine, Arizona. He was urged to do so because of the Pleasant Valley War. Buckskin Canyon, where he had settled, was named after the buckskin chaps his wife Elisabeth had made for him. Scarlet was next to leave, in 1888. His wife Lulu had become ill in June 1885. This may have contributed to his subsequent departure. In 1887, he was mentioned to have joined the posses of Joe McKiney's, under-sheriff for C.P. Owens. In 1889, Nathan, Alva, and Samuel Uriah Porter, arrived in Heber from St. Joseph (Joseph City). They grew crops of corn and potatoes between Heber and St. Joseph. The following year brought the Penrod and Sharp families from nearby Wilford. Samuel Porter would later describe the Penrods as anti-Mormon, and the Sharps as dishonest. In 1898, Hans Nielson abandoned his estate on the west bank of the Black Canyon where today's SR 260 enters town. Childless, Hans Nielson had been the first presiding elder for what became the Heber branch of the Joseph City Ward. James Shelley homesteaded land comprising the center of Heber and south down the Black Canyon. Of the original four pioneer families, starting out with four head of cattle, three daughters, and a few worldly possessions, James and Margaret Shelley were the only family to make Heber a long-term commitment.

=== Early Heber ===
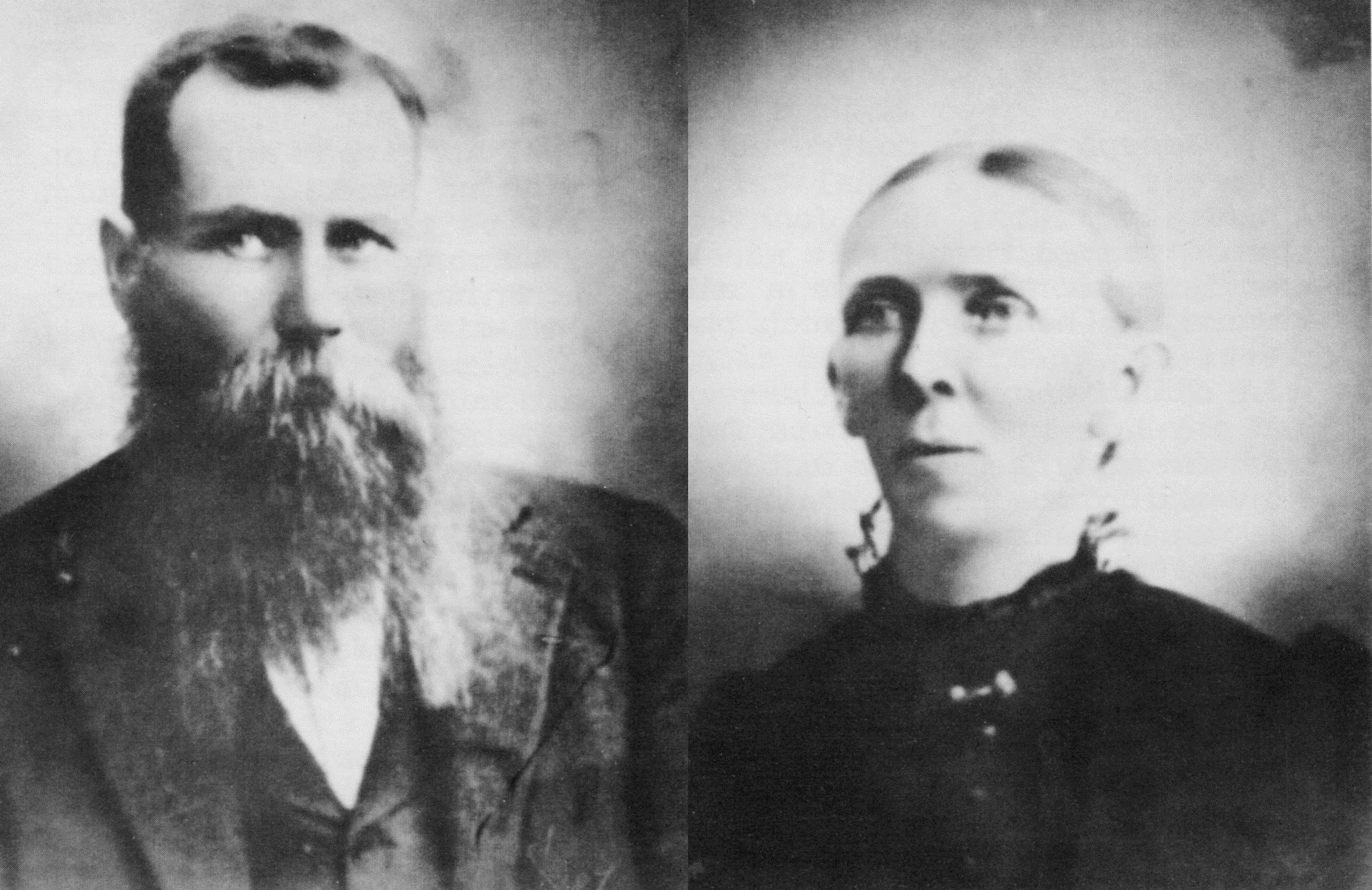
James and Margaret Shelley

In 1882, Heber J. Grant was called as a member of the Quorum of the Twelve. Early in his service in the quorum he made many trips to Arizona, earning the title "The Arizona Apostle". On one such trip, he passed through the settlement on his way to Phoenix, and stayed with the Shelleys in their cabin. The townspeople latter named their settlement after Grant.

An alternative version of Heber's name origin is that John Scarlett named the settlement after Heber C. Kimball, former chief justice of the State of Deseret.

The post office in Heber was established in 1890, and on September 11, 1890, James Shelley was appointed the first postmaster of Heber. Mail was brought by buckboard every Wednesday from Holbrook to Heber, then sorted and distributed. This duty was performed by Shelley, in addition to being a farmer, cattleman, husband and father.

Marion and Clarence Owens came to farm in Heber with their families in 1891. The following year, two practicing polygamists arrived from Utah to escape prosecution. One was called "Brother Luck". In 1893, Joseph Porter arrived in Heber to help his brother, Samuel Porter, with his farm. Also in 1893, John Nelson occupied a ranch in Brookbank Canyon, and the Baca family settled near the head of Black Canyon. Nelson and partner Nicholas Valentine, were in the sheep business, and the Porters hauled their wool to the Holbrook railroad.

Many settlements were located in the fertile cattle ranching land and farmlands of Black Canyon. Potatoes, corn, milk, and eggs were the livelihood of many families. Potato fields were located Buckskin Canyon, near the present-day Buckskin Artist Community. Cornfields and large gardens were where the present-day High School ball fields and Tenney's Trailer Park are located. All available land near town and in forest clearings was converted to farmland. Wilford, Jersey Gulch, Baca Ranch and present-day Potato Patch were favorite locations.

During this period, locals were fearful of the Apache Native Americans. Food was said to be given to all natives who passed through town, in order to keep the peace. Travel to and from St. Joseph was sometimes perilous due to outlaws and quicksand. Horses were the primary mode of transportation, and horse thieves were a major problem.

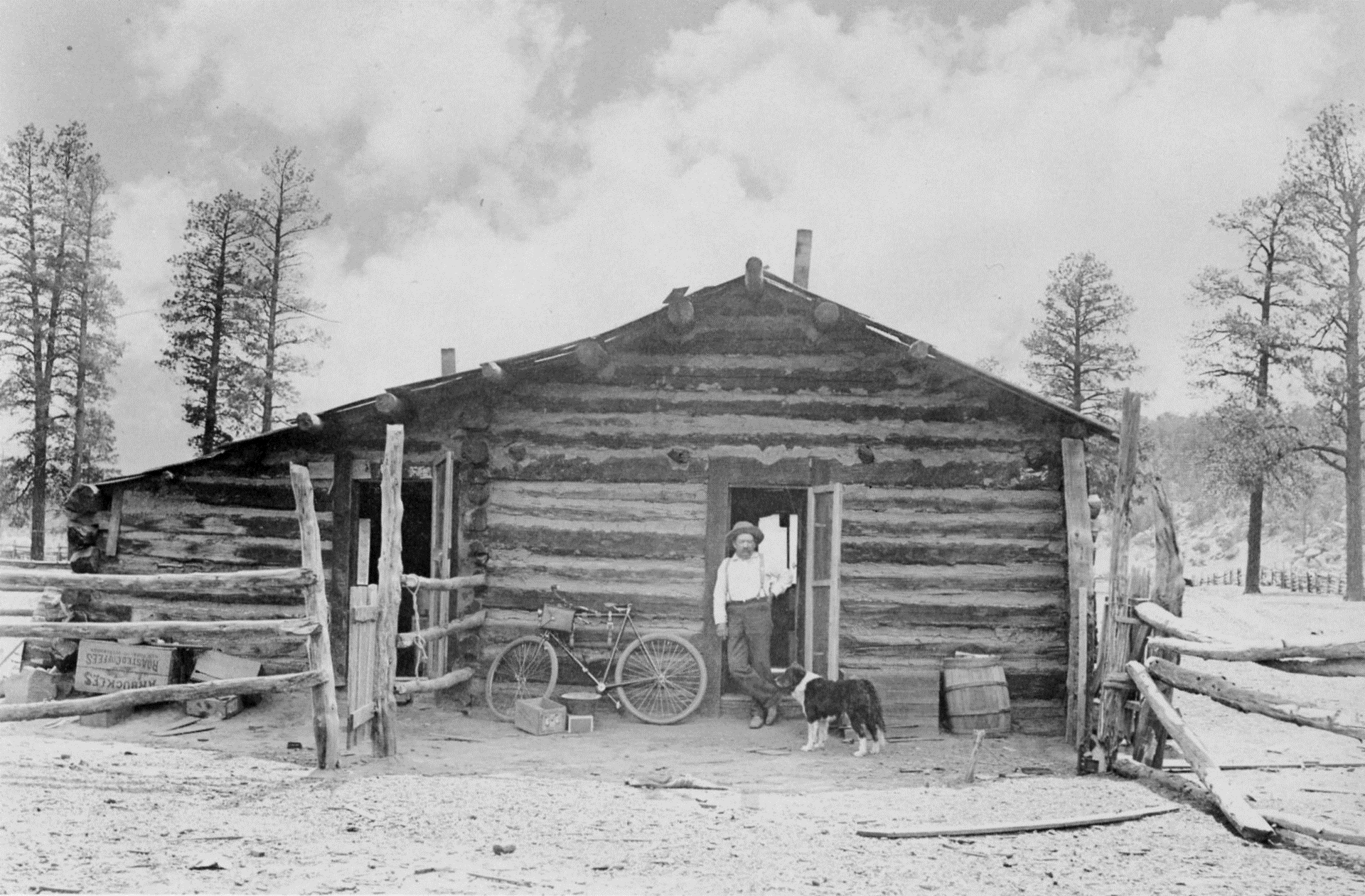
John Hoyle in front of first Heber store

In 1891 John Hoyle, born Johann Frederick Heil, an immigrant from Baden, Germany, and former cook for the Hashknife Outfit, opened the first Heber store. He was called "Hoyle" because some cowboys had trouble pronouncing his name. In addition to his store, he had a farm located down Buckskin Wash. Hoyle had relocated to Heber from the failed Wilford, Arizona settlement, 7 miles south of Heber, where he had a store and ranch. Samuel Porter helped him on his farm, and hauled freight to and from Holbrook. He ran the store until his death on August 2, 1912, of paralysis (possibly polio). He had no heirs to claim the land in the United States. Through a German consulate, twenty-eight distant heirs were located and $3,046 was divided among them.

May 1898 was so dry that water was hauled from wells in Wilford for household use. Heber wells still had enough for livestock. A small reservoir had been built below town, and filled up when water ran down the Black Canyon. A diversion dam was built to divert water from the wash to the ditch. When the rains finally came in July, the Independence Day celebration had cause for additional celebration. Residents celebrated by firing guns and firecrackers, and holding a dance that evening. Years later, the 4th of July would remain just as large a celebration in Heber. Alva Porter's Farm eventually became the rodeo grounds, where present-day Mogollon High School sits. During celebrations, the community roped calves, rode bucking horses, held pistol shooting contests, foot races, and dances.

=== 20th century ===
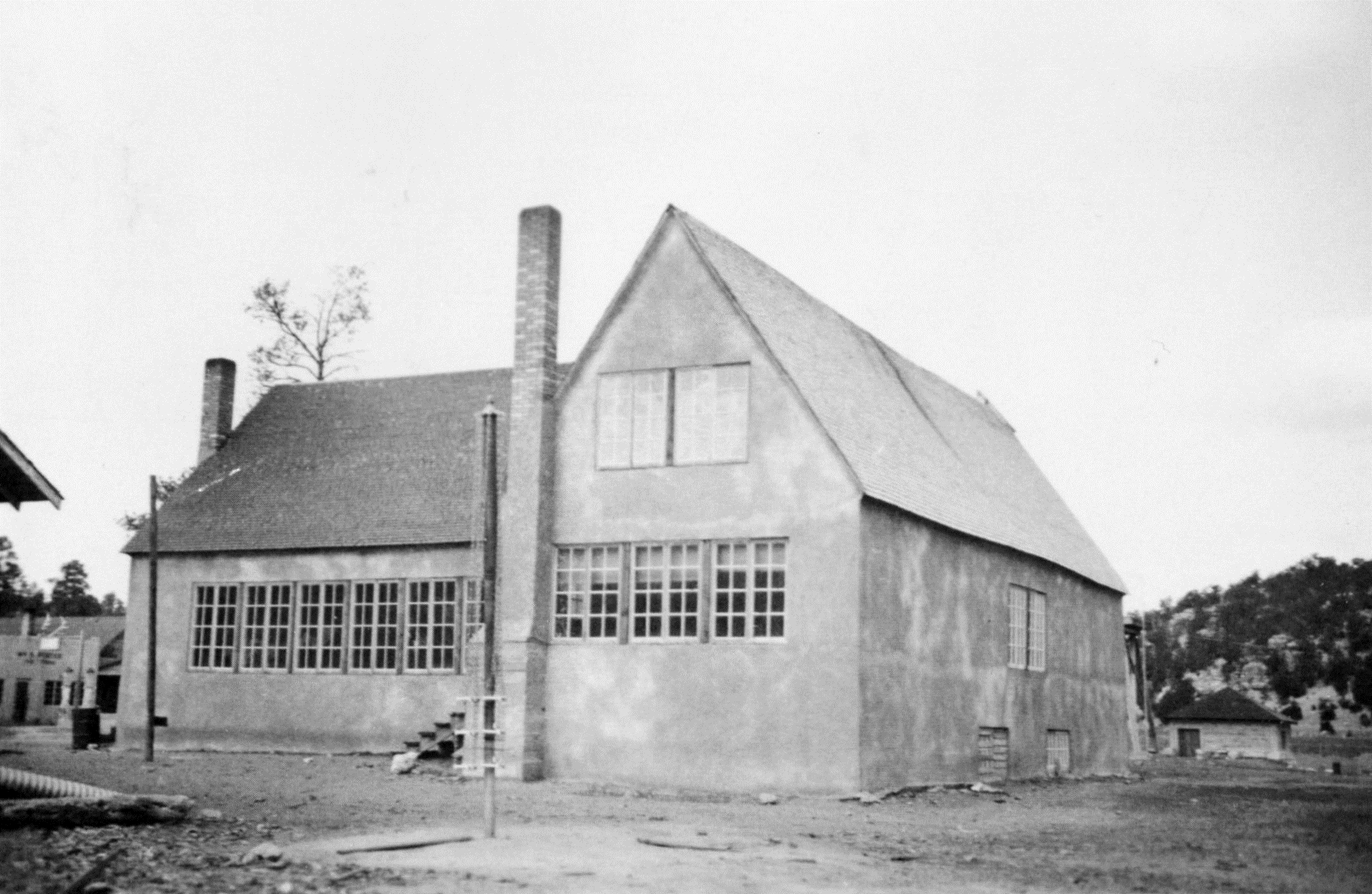
Heber's first LDS church

In 1904, severe drought caused hundreds of cattle belonging to the Aztec Land and Cattle Co. to die from thirst and hunger. During the spring, drinking water had to be hauled from 15 miles away. Many pioneers became disheartened and left the area.

By the 1930s, Heber had become a logging town. Horses were used to haul logs up until 1965. Logging and ranching were the predominant industries until the mid-90s, at which time the Mexican spotted owl injunction was put on the Sitgreaves National Forest. Bill Porter built the first sawmill in Heber just south of present-day HWY260 along the Black Canyon. This ran until 1935, when it burned down. In 1946, Lorin Donald (Donnie) Porter relocated his Wagon Draw sawmill to Heber. It ran until 1984, when a change of ownership was soon followed by bankruptcy.

Chris Overgaard moved to Arizona in 1936, "lured by the lush stands of Ponderosa". Modular mill pieces were hauled by train to nearby Holbrook, and then transported by wagon to "Overgaard's stop". Originally called "Oklahoma Flats", the town later changed its name in honor of Overgaard. The sawmill was assembled across SR 260 from the present-day Overgaard Food Center. Overgaard ran the sawmill until financial reversals resulted in its sale. The sawmill was replaced by a senior center that was lost in the Rodeo–Chediski Fire in the summer of 2002. The Rim Country Senior/Community Center has since been rebuilt.

The post office in Overgaard was established on October 14, 1938. William T. Shockley served as the first postmaster in 1938, followed by Christ Overgaard in 1939.

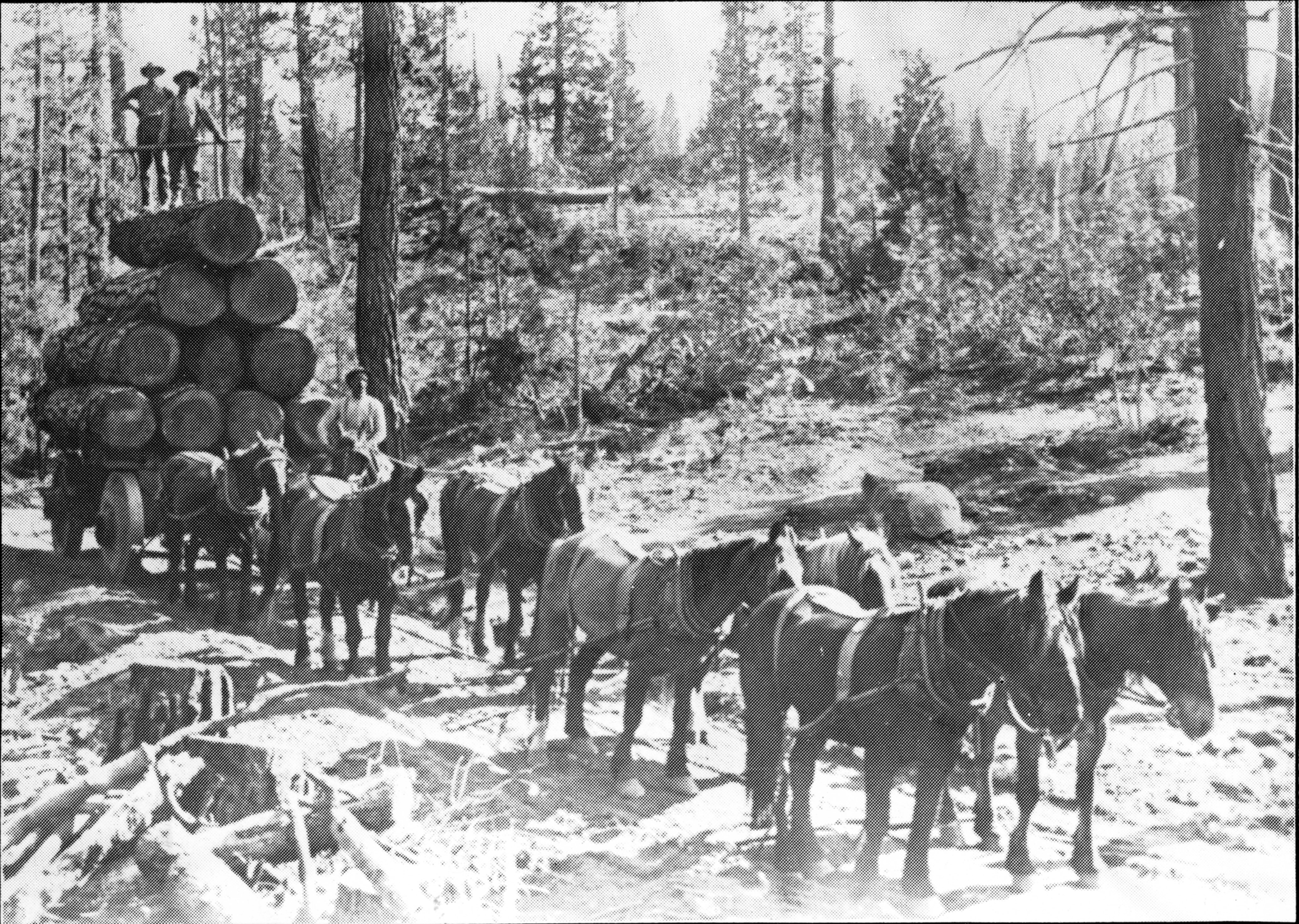
Early logging between Heber and Overgaard

On February 1, 1971, the local sheriff's posse formed a committee to promote the construction of a Fire Department for the Heber–Overgaard area. By March, land was secured for the location of the new fire department. In February 1972, the posse disbanded because some members had moved out of the area. In early 1973, the newly formed American Legion Post 86 took over the task of forming a fire department and fire district for the area. They obtained the signatures necessary to call an election to form a fire district. A petition was used to propose the formation of a fire district to the County Board of Supervisors. The American Legion put up the funds for an election. On June 4, 1973, by unanimous vote, the Heber–Overgaard Fire District was established. It had an area of 102 square miles. On June 14, Ivan Wilson was elected as the first fire chief of the new district, and Larry Rhodes was the secretary-treasurer. Walt Downs and John Shaffery Sr. were the first to sign up as firefighters.

The first Fourth of July parade was held in 1976. The parade has become one of Heber's most popular ways to celebrate Independence Day, drawing crowds upwards of 20,000. In recent years, the parade and fireworks displays have been moved to the weekend nearest the 4th of July as a convenience to non-locals.

On July 4, 1980, Les Parham, of Heber–Overgaard, put on his first of 39 years of fireworks displays, his last being on July 6, 2019. Fundraising was spearheaded by the Heber-Overgaard Chamber of Commerce and was solely paid for by the contributions of viewers who enjoyed the show. The first show was held in what was once known as the Porter softball field, at the southwest corner of Parkview and HW260, to an audience of several hundred. Today, an audience in the thousands views the display at the Mogollon High School fields.

In 1988, Heber–Overgaard celebrated its first Oktoberfest event at Tall Timbers County Park. Originally taking place in October, the festivities were eventually moved to September as a convenience to seasonal visitors. The event primarily consists of food, live music, a beer garden and arts and crafts booths.

On August 24, 1995, federal Judge Carl Muecke ordered the 11 national forests of Arizona and New Mexico to halt all logging until their forest plans adequately protected the Mexican spotted owl. The injunction was placed after a lawsuit was filed by Robin Silver, conservation chairman of the Southwest Center for Biological Diversity. The controversial shutdown affected eight large mills, several small mills, and hundreds of jobs. Many Heber–Overgaard residents were forced to relocate and find work elsewhere. Black ribbons were placed throughout town to raise awareness of the situation, and to show support for the loggers and their families. Environmentalists argued that "jobs would vanish no matter what, for if cutting continued at its current rate, the old-growth forests would be gone within thirty years and the mills forced to close anyhow". The forests remained closed for over eight years. In 2002, the Parker Mill, in Clay Springs (16 miles away), and the Snowflake Mill (35 miles east) were two of the first mills to start up again.

=== 21st century ===
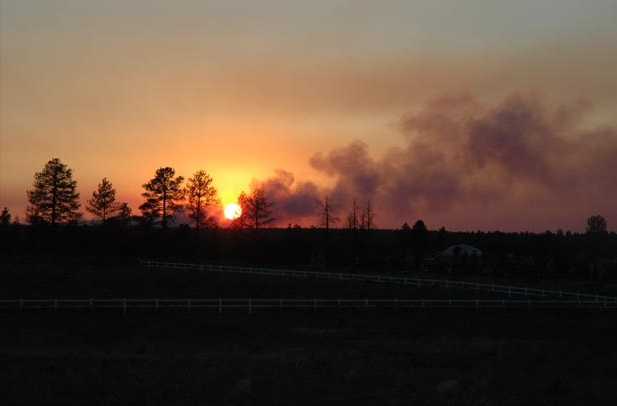
Rodeo-Chediski Fire, Bison Ranch

In 2002, the Rodeo–Chediski Fire burned in Heber–Overgaard beginning on June 18, 2002, and was not controlled until July 7. It was the second worst forest fire in Arizona to date, destroying 268 structures in Heber–Overgaard (mainly in Overgaard), and consuming 467,066 acres (1,890.15 km^{2}). Overgaard was evacuated for nearly two weeks while the fire was fought.

Founded in 2005 and opening to the public in 2017, the Apache-Sitgreaves Observatory offers public viewing of the night sky using the largest dedicated public telescope in Arizona. The 36-inch diameter telescope at Apache-Sitgreaves Observatory, bordering the Apache-Sitgreaves National Forest on Overgaard's east side, has some of the darkest skies and is the closest observatory to the Phoenix metro area.

Today, Heber–Overgaard has evolved into a retirement and tourism destination. Hiking and fishing can be enjoyed in the summer, and cross-country skiing in the winter. With a four-seasons climate, the town is a haven for those wishing to escape the heat of Phoenix.

Land ownership in the Heber–Overgaard area is private, but it is surrounded by federally owned lands. As of 2010, nearly 66% of the houses were second homes. While the full-time resident population was then 2,822, summertime population numbers climbed to nearly 12,000.

== Geography ==
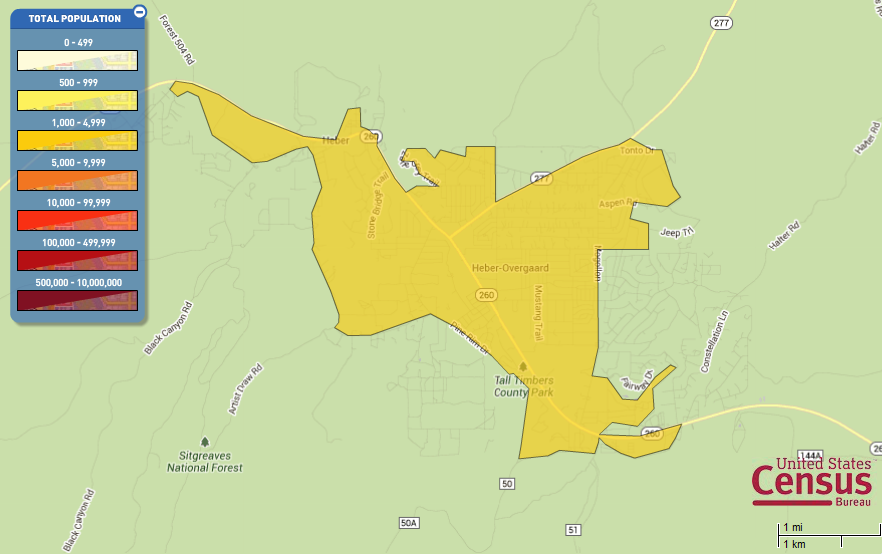
U.S. Census (2010)

Heber–Overgaard is located in the southwestern United States, in the central-eastern portion of Arizona, about halfway between Payson to the southwest and Show Low to the southeast. By car, the town is approximately 144 miles (231.74 km) north of Phoenix, at the junction of SR 260 and SR 277.

It lies at a mean elevation of 6,627 feet (2,020 m), in the Apache–Sitgreaves National Forest. The town is located in the White Mountains on the southern border of the Colorado Plateau and is surrounded by forest service land.

Other than Black Canyon and Buckskin Canyon in Heber, the topography of Heber–Overgaard ranges from rolling hills to flat meadows. Public roadways are maintained by Navajo County Public Works, with graded dirt roads making up the majority of outlying roads. SR 260 and SR 277 are maintained by ADOT.

According to the United States Census Bureau, the CDP has a total area of 6.9 square miles (18 km^{2}), all land.

With a population of 2,822, the density rate is approximately 411 people per square mile.

=== Nearest cities and towns ===
- Aripine
- Clay Springs
- Forest Lakes
- Holbrook
- Show Low
- Snowflake

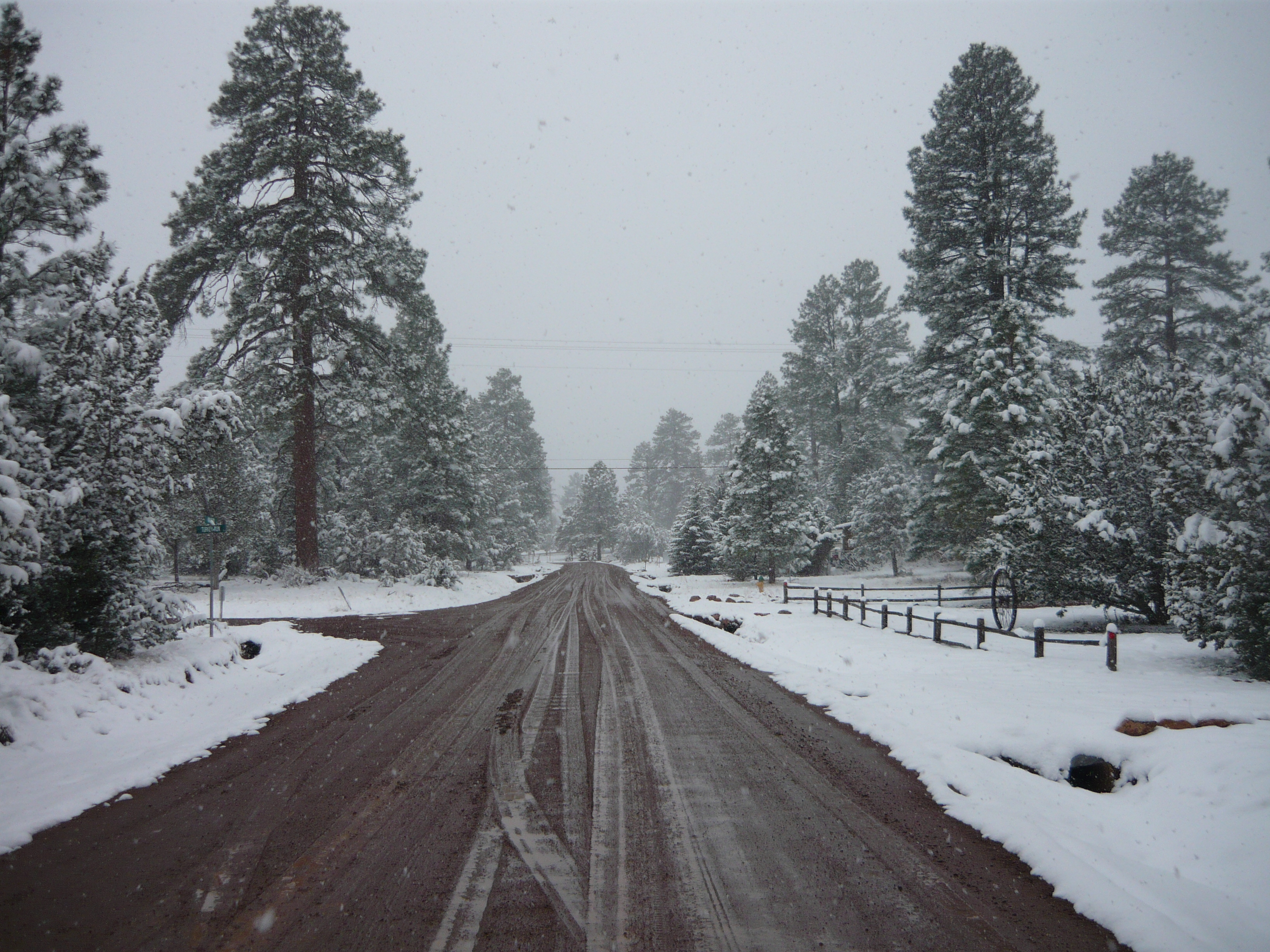
April snow in Heber–Overgaard

=== Climate ===
Heber–Overgaard has an atypical version of a warm-summer Mediterranean climate (Köppen: Csb) with a dry period in early summer followed by heavy monsoonal thunderstorms and rain from frontal cloudbands in the cooler months. Like more typical Mediterranean climates, however, forest fires tend to be extremely prevalent during dry summer periods.

Climate data for Heber–Overgaard, Arizona (1991-2020 normals, extremes 1950–present)
Month	Jan	Feb	Mar	Apr	May	Jun	Jul	Aug	Sep	Oct	Nov	Dec	Year
Record high °F (°C)	72 (22)	78 (26)	78 (26)	85 (29)	91 (33)	100 (38)	100 (38)	98 (37)	94 (34)	87 (31)	78 (26)	70 (21)	100 (38)
Mean maximum °F (°C)	58.7 (14.8)	62.9 (17.2)	69.5 (20.8)	75.6 (24.2)	82.7 (28.2)	90.5 (32.5)	91.2 (32.9)	88.1 (31.2)	84.7 (29.3)	78.8 (26.0)	69.4 (20.8)	61.9 (16.6)	92.4 (33.6)
Mean daily maximum °F (°C)	45.6 (7.6)	49.6 (9.8)	56.5 (13.6)	63.6 (17.6)	71.0 (21.7)	81.7 (27.6)	83.0 (28.3)	80.5 (26.9)	75.5 (24.2)	66.9 (19.4)	55.3 (12.9)	45.6 (7.6)	64.6 (18.1)
Daily mean °F (°C)	32.7 (0.4)	36.2 (2.3)	42.1 (5.6)	47.8 (8.8)	54.9 (12.7)	64.8 (18.2)	69.4 (20.8)	67.6 (19.8)	61.5 (16.4)	51.5 (10.8)	41.0 (5.0)	32.7 (0.4)	50.2 (10.1)
Mean daily minimum °F (°C)	19.9 (−6.7)	22.9 (−5.1)	27.7 (−2.4)	32.0 (0.0)	38.9 (3.8)	47.9 (8.8)	55.8 (13.2)	54.8 (12.7)	47.5 (8.6)	36.1 (2.3)	26.7 (−2.9)	19.9 (−6.7)	35.8 (2.1)
Mean minimum °F (°C)	2.8 (−16.2)	7.1 (−13.8)	13.5 (−10.3)	18.9 (−7.3)	26.4 (−3.1)	35.3 (1.8)	46.6 (8.1)	46.2 (7.9)	33.5 (0.8)	21.5 (−5.8)	11.1 (−11.6)	2.1 (−16.6)	−1.5 (−18.6)
Record low °F (°C)	−25 (−32)	−18 (−28)	−12 (−24)	3 (−16)	13 (−11)	21 (−6)	30 (−1)	30 (−1)	21 (−6)	9 (−13)	−11 (−24)	−22 (−30)	−25 (−32)
Average precipitation inches (mm)	1.74 (44)	1.65 (42)	1.41 (36)	0.67 (17)	0.63 (16)	0.45 (11)	2.67 (68)	2.98 (76)	1.84 (47)	1.22 (31)	1.24 (31)	1.87 (47)	18.37 (466)
Average snowfall inches (cm)	7.1 (18)	6.4 (16)	1.9 (4.8)	0.5 (1.3)	0.1 (0.25)	0.0 (0.0)	0.0 (0.0)	0.0 (0.0)	0.0 (0.0)	0.4 (1.0)	0.9 (2.3)	5.0 (13)	32.0 (81)
Average precipitation days (≥ 0.01 inch)	2.5	3.1	3.3	1.9	1.9	2.2	9.9	9.2	5.0	3.1	2.5	3.3	47.9
Average snowy days (≥ 0.1 inch)	2.4	2.1	1	0.9	0.0	0.0	0.0	0.0	0.0	0.1	1	1.1	8.6
Source 1: NOAA
Source 2: National Weather Service

=== Flora and fauna ===
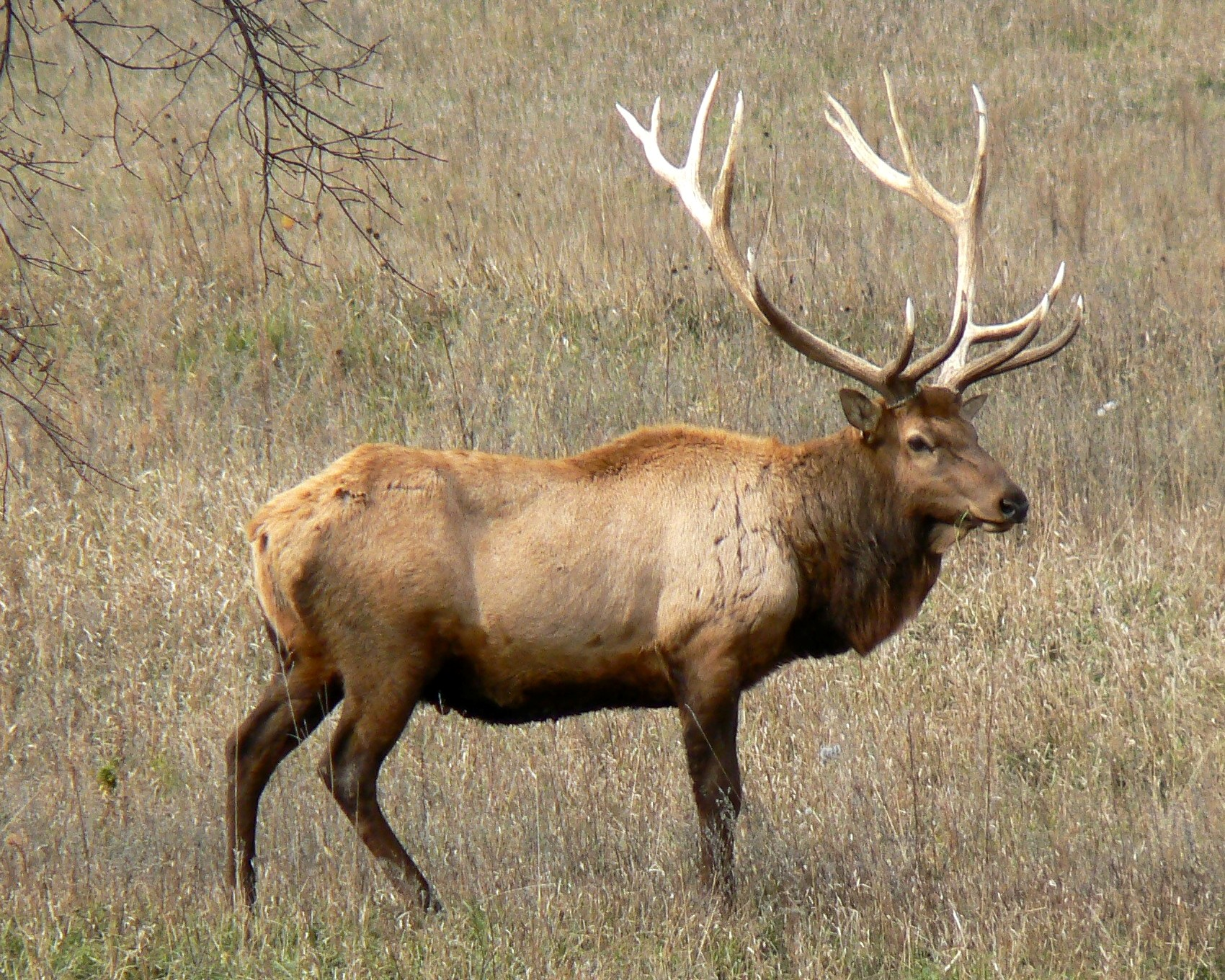
Bull elk

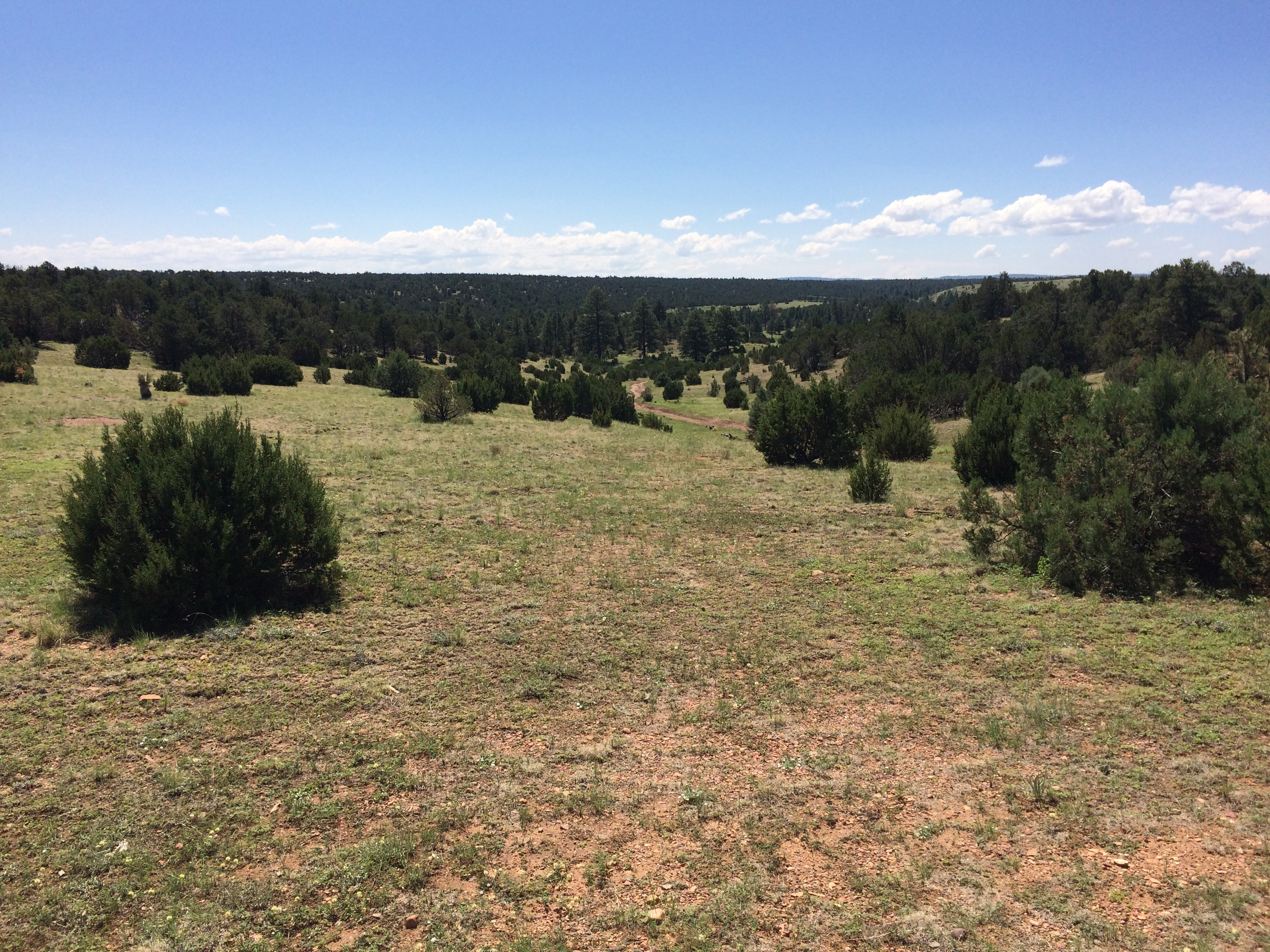
Pinyon-juniper woodland west of Overgaard

While some of the native flora and fauna of the Apache–Sitgreaves National Forest can be found within town limits, most are found in the rural and the undeveloped forest areas surrounding Heber–Overgaard.

Native mammal species include antelope, Arizona gray squirrel, beaver, black bear, coyote, deer mouse, desert cottontail rabbit, elk, gopher, ground squirrel, gray fox, harvest mouse, hog-nosed skunk, jackrabbit, javelina, kit fox, Mexican wolf, mountain cottontail, mountain lion, mule deer, porcupine, raccoon, red squirrel, rock squirrel, striped skunk, white-footed mouse, white-tailed deer, and various bats.

There are many species of native birds, including the acorn woodpecker, crow, bald eagle, broad-tailed hummingbird, cooper's hawk, flammulated owl, gambel's quail, golden eagle, greater roadrunner, great horned owl, hairy woodpecker, hooded oriole, pinon jay, red-tailed hawk, kestrel, northern cardinal, robin, steller's jay, raven, turkey vulture, wild turkey, and western bluebird, as well as a variety of songbirds.

The area is home to a number of native reptile species, including several types of venomous rattlesnakes (Arizona black rattlesnake, prairie rattlesnake, and western black-tailed rattlesnake), mildly venomous snakes (black-necked gartersnake, narrowhead garter snake, and western terrestrial garter snake), and non-venomous snakes (California kingsnake, glossy snake, gopher snake, long-nosed snake, striped whipsnake, and ring-necked snake). Lizards include eastern collared lizard, greater short-horned lizard, ornate tree lizard, plateau fence lizard, sagebrush lizard, and several types of whiptails. Skinks include the Great Plains skink and the many-lined skink.

Native amphibian species include the American bullfrog, Arizona toad, Arizona tree frog, canyon tree frog, chiricahua leopard frog, Couch's spadefoot toad, Great Plains toad, Mexican spadefoot, northern leopard frog, Plains spadefoot toad, red-spotted toad, western tiger salamander, and Woodhouse's toad.

The town and the surrounding areas are home to a wide variety of native invertebrates, including the Arizona blond tarantula, black widow, cottonwood stag beetle, Grant's hercules beetle, gray bird grasshopper, gray hairstreak butterfly, monarch butterfly, painted lady butterfly, sonoran desert centipede, tarantula hawk wasp, ten-lined June beetle, and wolf spider as well as a variety of moths.

Heber–Overgaard is located in the transition zone between montane conifer forest and pinyon-juniper woodland. Local flora include open forest dominated by ponderosa pine pines, pinyon pines (Colorado pinion, and single-leaf pinyon), and low, bushy, evergreen junipers (alligator juniper, California juniper, sierra juniper, and Utah juniper). Other flora include the Arizona thistle, birdbill dayflower, blue grama, camphorweed, cardinal catchfly, Colorado four o'clock, Cooley's bundleflower, desert portulaca, dwarf stickpea, fragrant sumac, hairy grama, horsetail milkweed, narrowleaf yucca, pinewoods geranium, pygmy bluet, ragleaf bahia, redroot buckwheat, sideoats grama, southwestern cosmos, southwestern prickly poppy, starvation prickly-pear, threadleaf groundsel, thyme-leafed spurge, twist spine prickly pear, upright prairie coneflower, virgate scorpionweed, viviparous foxtail cactus, western spiderwort, wholeleaf Indian paintbrush, wild potato, winged buckwheat, woolly locoweed, and Wyoming Indian paintbrush. Local noxious and invasive weeds include morning-glory, mullein, oxeye daisy, tansy ragwort, whitetop, and various thistles.

== Demographics ==
Historical population
Census	Pop.	Note	%±
1990	1,581		—
2000	2,722		72.2%
2010	2,822		3.7%
2020	2,898		2.7%
U.S. Decennial Census

As of the census of 2020, there were 2,898 people, 1,350 occupied households (2,197 unoccupied), and 1,192 family units residing in the CDP. The population density was 422.45 inhabitants per square mile (163.11/km^{2}). There were 3,547 housing units at an average density of 517.6 per square mile (199.8/km^{2}). Occupied housing units consisted of 2.3% without a bedroom, 8.6% with one bedroom, 83% with 2–3 bedrooms, and 5.5% with 4 or more bedrooms. Median gross rent was $691.

The racial makeup of the CDP was 1.7% American Indian or Alaska Native, 0.4% Asian, 0.4% Black or African American, 11.4% Hispanic or Latino, 0.2% Native Hawaiian or Pacific Islander, 83.8% not Hispanic or Latino, 87.6% White, 3.7% from other races, and 6.0% from two or more races.

There were 1,350 households, out of which 16.5% had children under the age of 18 living with them, 45.2% were married couples living together, 29.1% had a male householder with no wife present, and 19.7% had a female householder with no husband present. The average family size was 2.96. Of 3,547 housing units, 2,197 were vacant. Veterans made up 20.1% of the population. Marital status makeup for the CDP was 49.3% married, 8.7% widowed, 19.2% divorced, 1.6% separated, and 21.2% never married. Population by age ranged with 2.4% under the age of 5, 9.3% from 5 to 14, 4.8% from 15 to 17, 16.5% under 18, 65% 18 and over, 34.4% 65 and over. The older population consisted of 19.3% 65 to 74, 10.2% 75–84, and 4.8% 85 and older. The median household age was 55.4 years.

The median income for a household in the CDP was $35,417, the median income for a family was $37,672, married-couple families was $37,961 and non-family was $26,858. About 22.3% of the population were below the poverty line, including 34.7% of those under age 18, 29.2% age 18–64, and 6.4% of those age 65 or over. 26.6% of the total population were on disability.

The industry was made of 10.7% agriculture, forestry, fishing, and hunting; 12.3% construction; 24.4% retail; 4.4% transport, warehousing, utilities; 4.7% information; 3.4% finance and insurance, real estate, and rental and leasing; 4.4% professional, scientific, and administrative and waste management; 9.4% arts, entertainment, and recreation, and accommodation and food services; 4.3% other services; and 1.5% public administration. The employment rate was 33.8%.

Education attainment consisted of 32.1% with a high school or equivalent degree, 31.2% with some college (no degree), 8.8% with an associate degree, 11.8% with a bachelor's degree, and 3.7% with a graduate or professional degree. The school enrolled population was 86.9% consisting of 0% preschool, 86.9% kindergarten to 12th grade, 13% college or undergraduate, and 0% graduate or professional degree.

== Economy ==
Retirement and tourism are an important part of the Heber–Overgaard economy. Proximity to the Sitgreaves National Forest provides recreational opportunities, and timber is harvested for Precision Pine Sawmill and Stone Container Paper Mill. A mulch plant processes forest by-products.

Service businesses provide employment and services for the predominant retirement community. Government and schools also contribute to the local economy. Retail trade is increasing. Construction is also a major factor in the area's gradually expanding economy.

== Parks and outdoor recreation ==
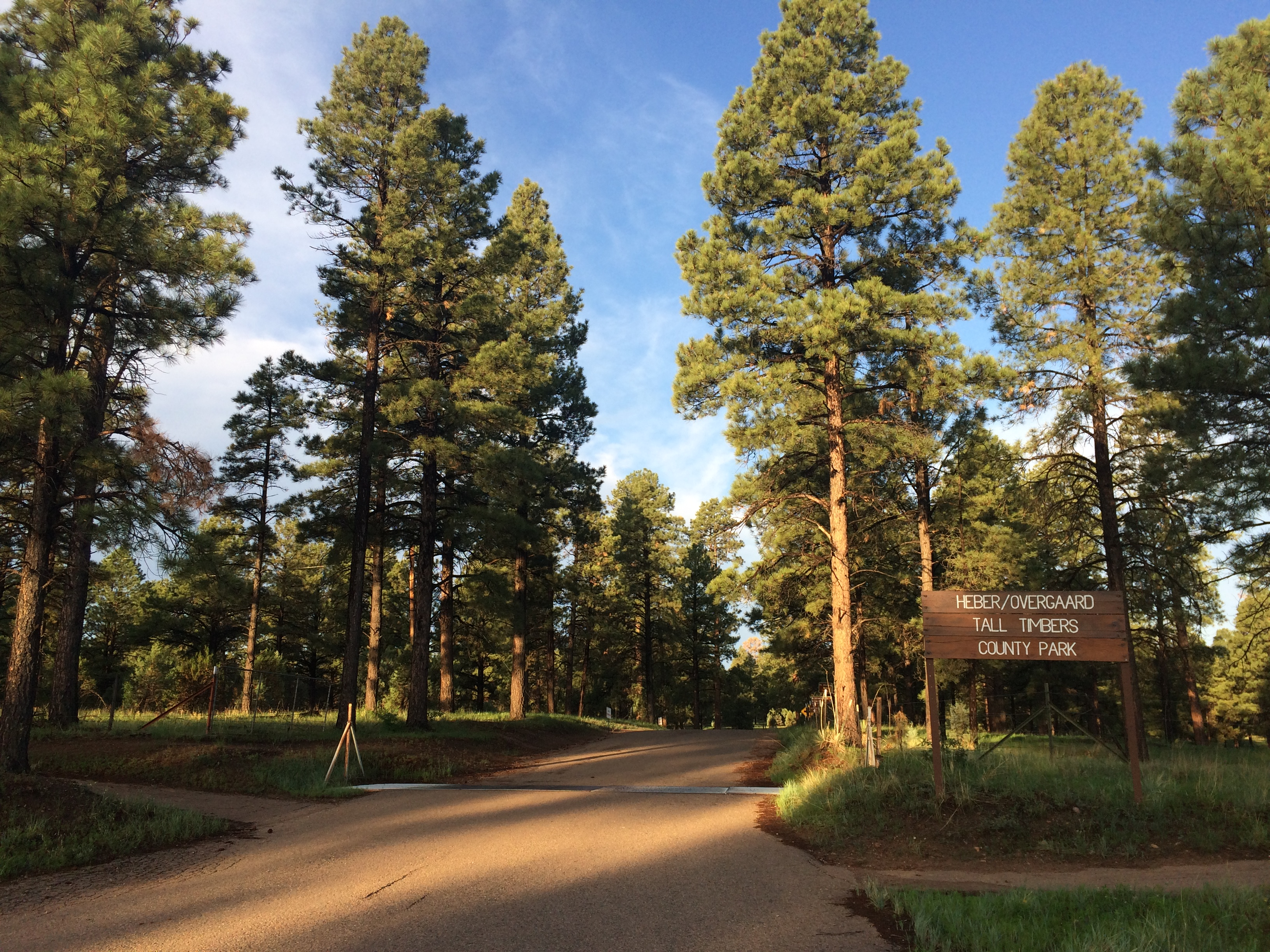
Tall Timbers County Park

Community facilities include a public library, 40-acre park, astronomical observatory, and aviation airpark. Athletic facilities include baseball, football and Little League fields; and basketball, volleyball, tennis and racquet ball courts.

Immediately south of Heber–Overgaard is the Mogollon Rim, a steep escarpment ranging from 1,000 to 2,000 feet from the base to the highest plateau. The Rim divides the northern plateau region from the lower central and southern areas. The Rim offers scenic views and numerous man-made lakes ideal for fishing.

Hunting for elk, deer, turkey, antelope and bear is permitted. Fishing in nearby trout streams is popular. There are also picnic and camping facilities available within the area. Other scenic attractions in the area include Black Canyon Lake, Willow Springs Lake, Woods Canyon Lake, Chevelon Canyon Lake, the Canyon Creek Fish Hatchery, Chevelon Butte, and the Fort Apache Indian Reservation.

== Public services ==
Heber–Overgaard is unincorporated, and is governed by the Navajo County Board of Supervisors. Education, fire and police services are provided by the county.

=== Education ===
The Heber–Overgaard Unified School District serves Heber–Overgaard. Mountain Meadows Primary School (grades Pre K–3), Capps Middle School (grades 4–6), Mogollon Junior High School (grades 7–8), and Mogollon High School (grades 9–12) serve the community. Student enrollment is approximately 471.

Northland Pioneer College, a state-accredited community college, serves Navajo County remotely via satellite. The college has centers located in Holbrook, Show Low, Snowflake/Taylor, and Winslow.

=== Police and fire department ===
The community is served by the sheriff's posse, county deputies, and the Department of Public Safety.

The Heber–Overgaard Fire Department was founded on February 1, 1971. The fire department has three paramedics, five IMETs, 15 EMTs, and 40 volunteers.

=== Transportation ===
Mountain Valley Shuttle stops in Heber on its Phoenix–Show Low route.

Residents of Heber–Overgaard have access to public airports in Show Low 36 miles southeast, or Taylor, 29 miles northeast, and a private airpark located in Overgaard.

== Media and popular culture ==
- The country rock band Mogollon was formed in Overgaard in the early 1980s. The group's name was derived from the nearby Mogollon Rim. What was once "a good way for a few high school buddies to impress the girls and to combat the boredom of a small town" soon turned into "one of the Premier Country Rock Entertainment groups in the West." Mogollon has performed at Heber–Overgaard's annual Independence Day fireworks festivities on numerous occasions.
- On November 5, 1975, logger Travis Walton was allegedly abducted by a UFO while working with a logging crew in the Apache-Sitgreaves National Forest. He was found five days later at a Heber gas station. He was not naked, as is popularly believed. The case received mainstream publicity, and remains one of the "best-known instances of alleged alien abduction". His book about the alleged alien encounter, The Walton Experience (1978), was loosely adapted into the movie Fire in the Sky (1993) by Paramount Pictures.
- The Heber area is mentioned in the book Weird Arizona as being a prominent site for supposed Mogollon Monster (bigfoot) encounters.
Heber–Overgaard gallery
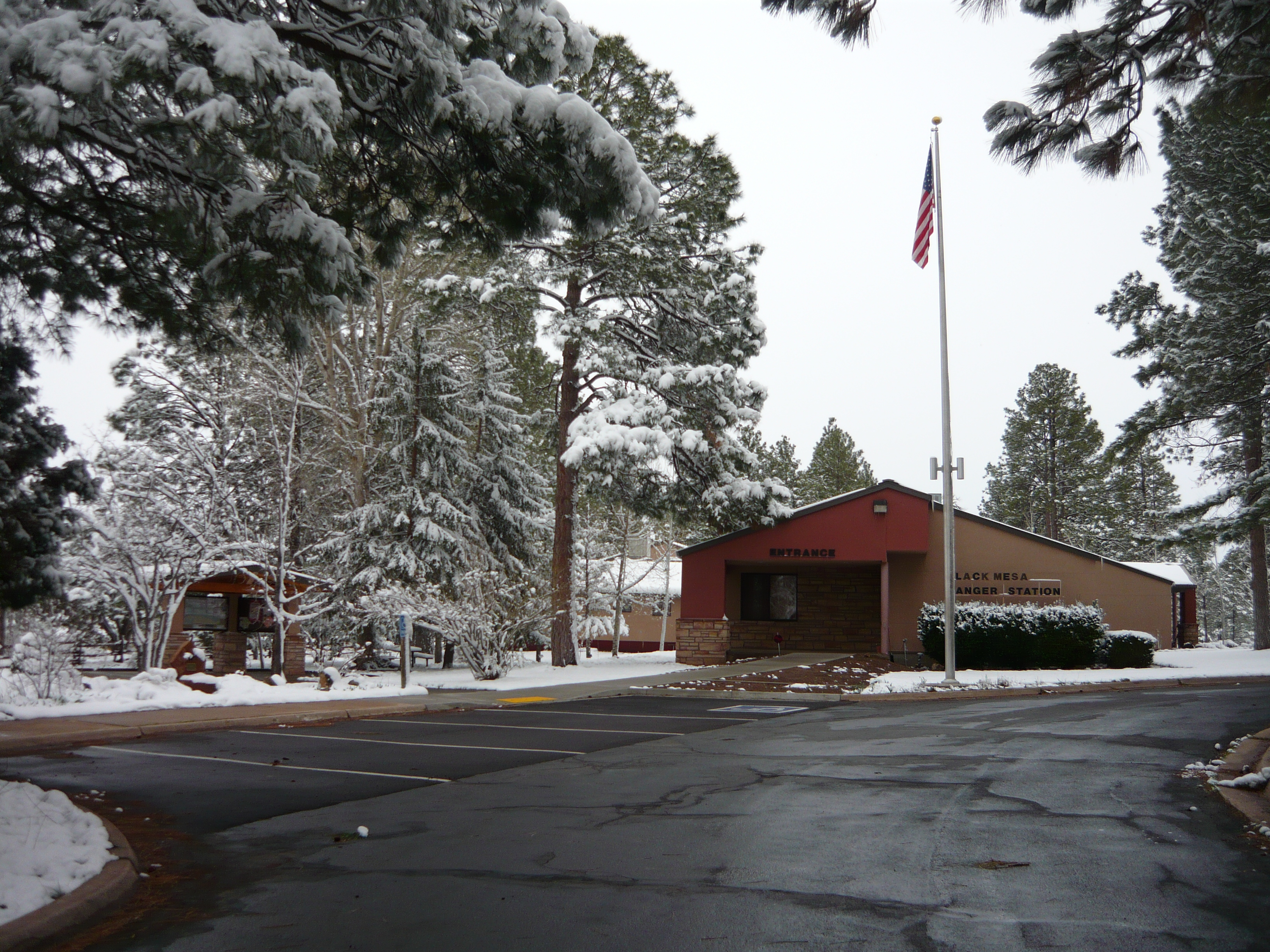
Black Mesa Ranger District

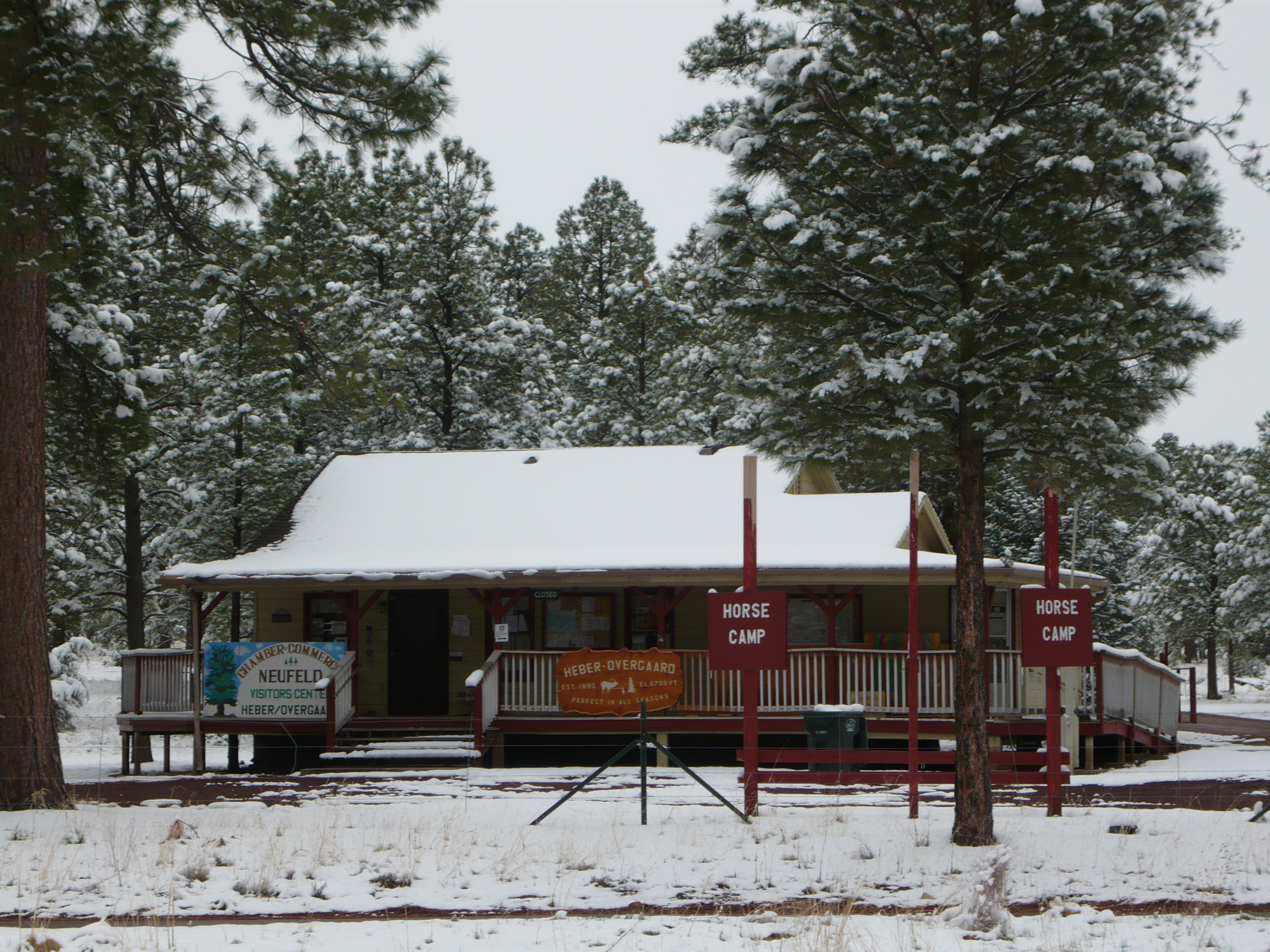
Heber–Overgaard Chamber of Commerce

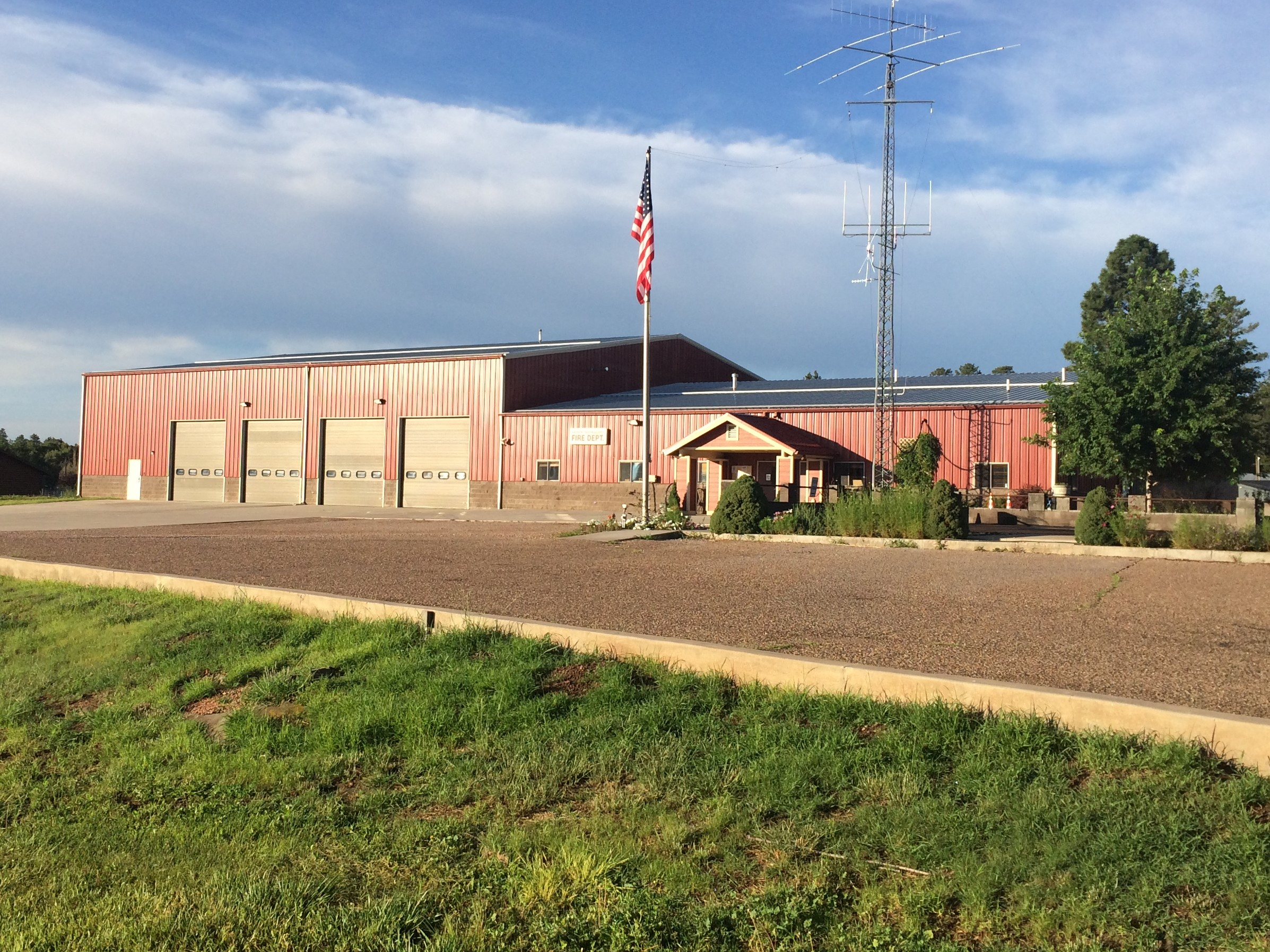
Heber–Overgaard Fire District

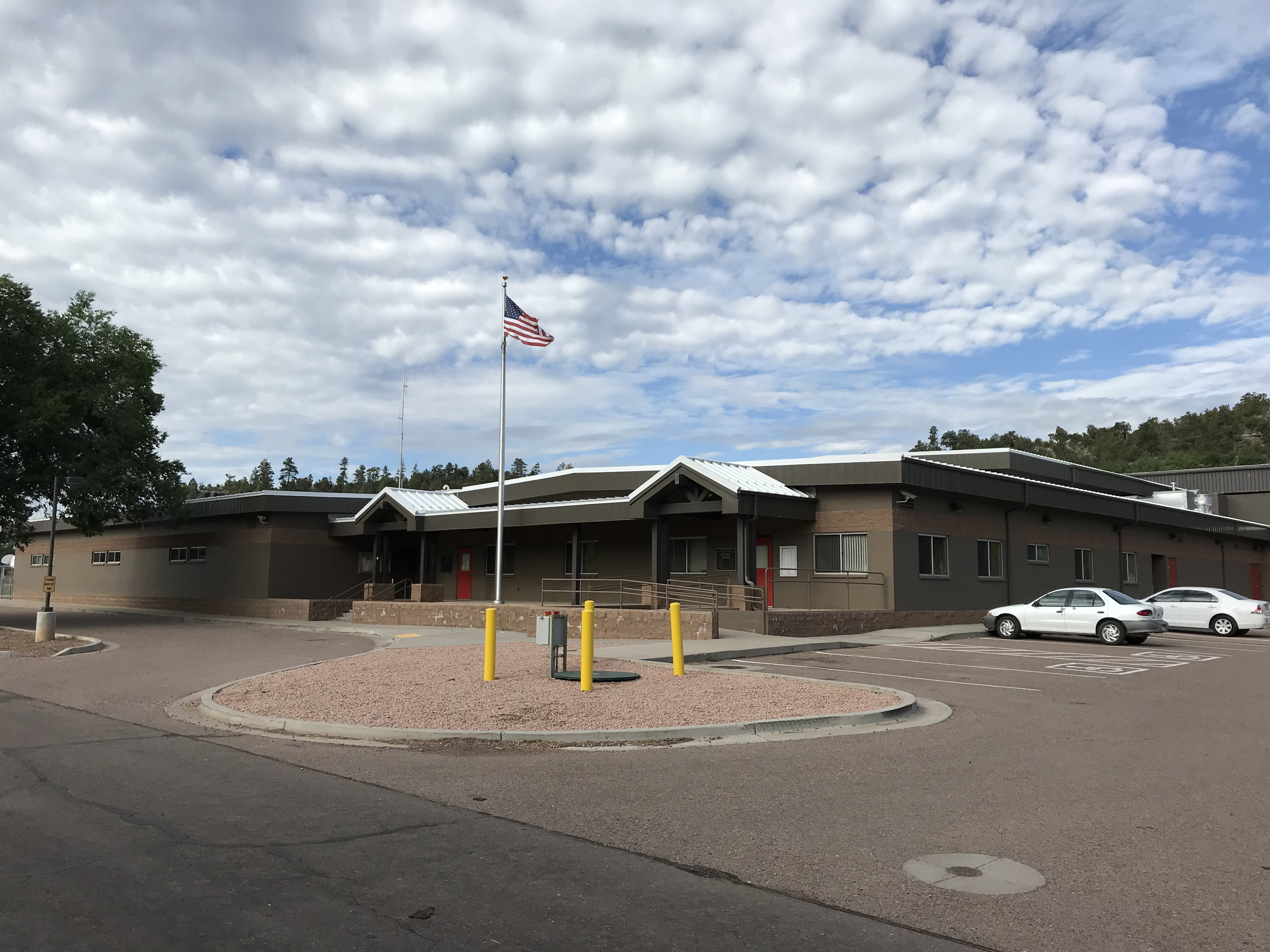
Heber–Overgaard Unified School District administrative office

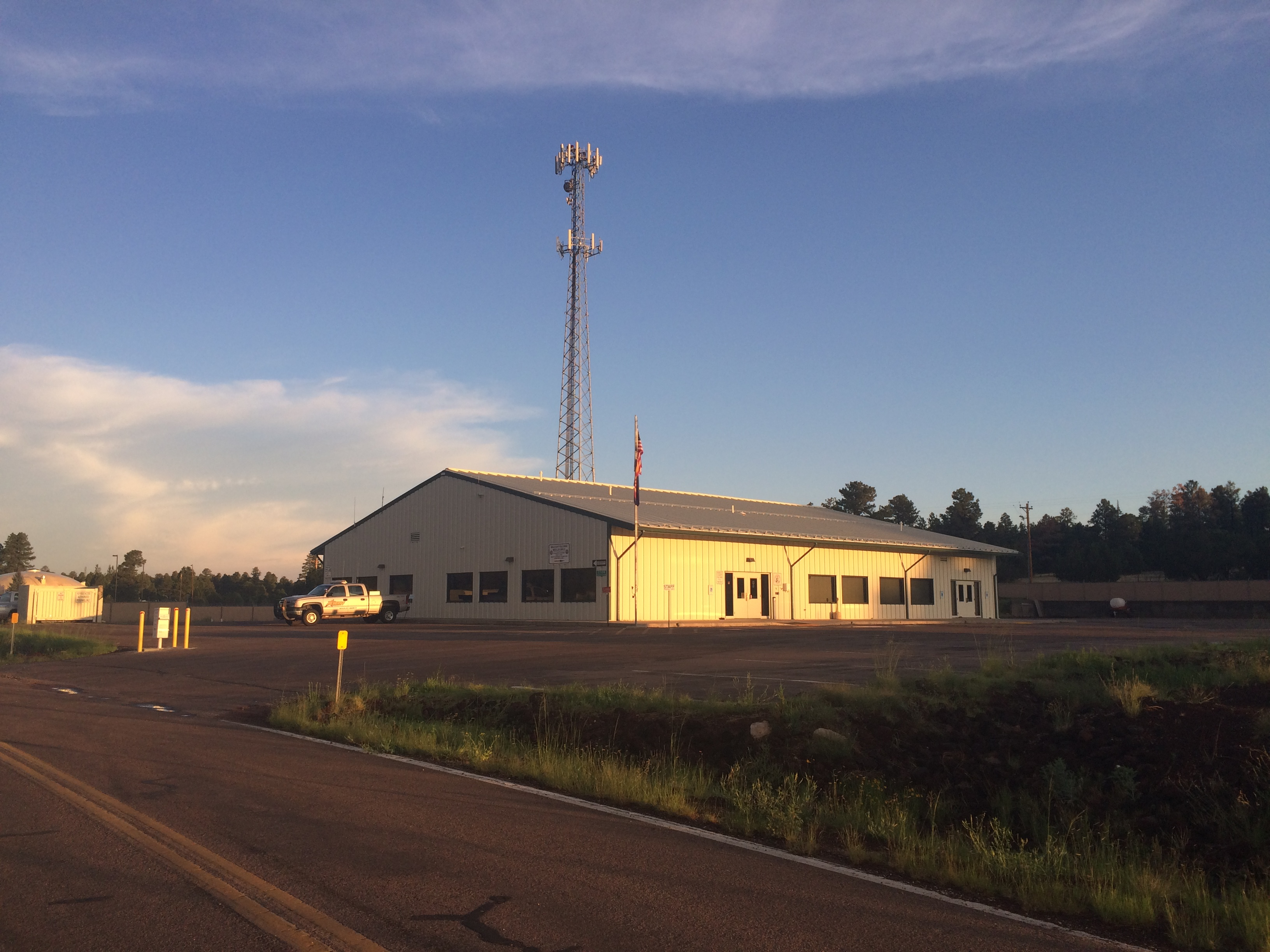
Navajo County Heber Complex (sheriff's office)

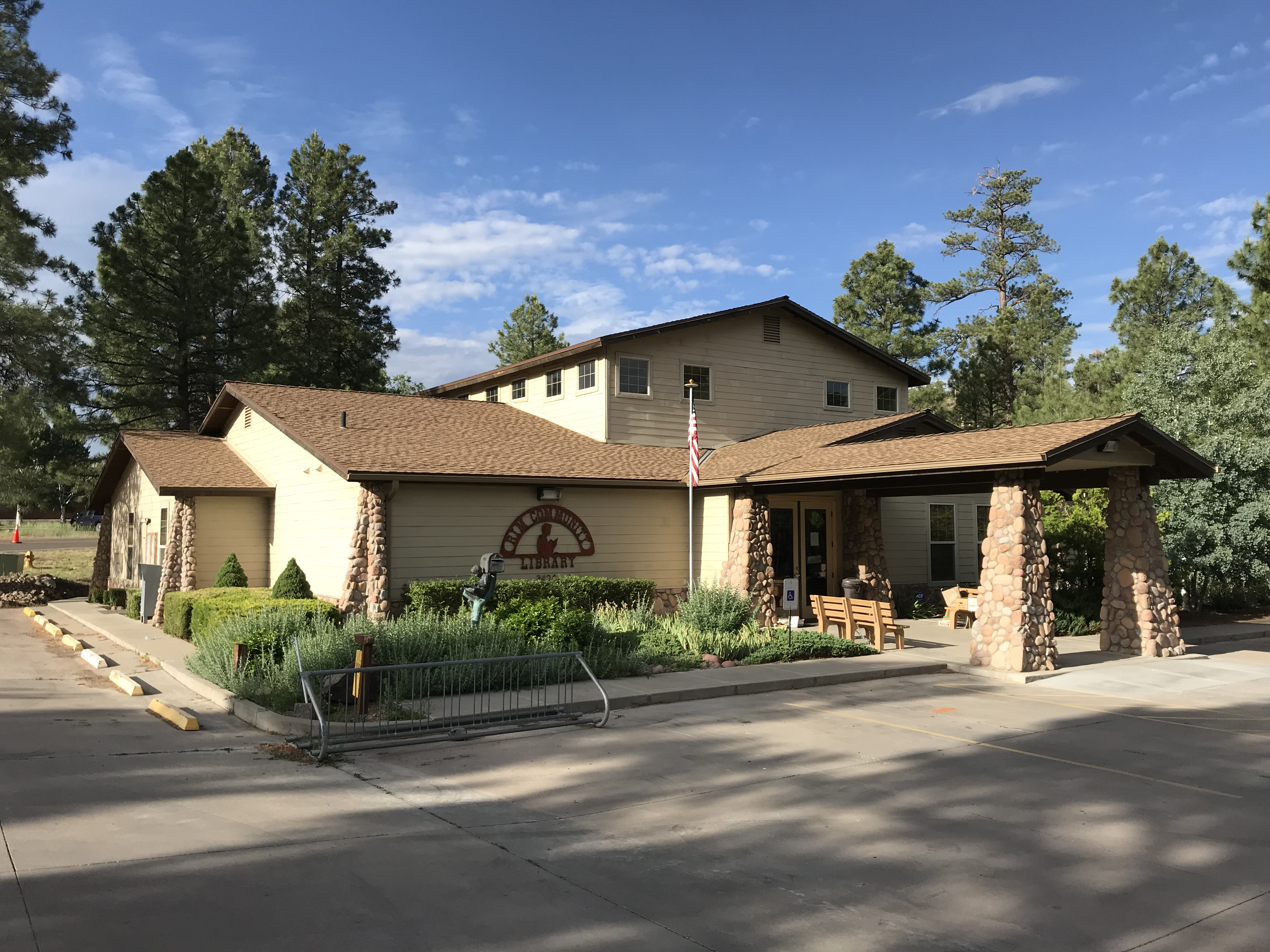
Rim Community Library

== Notable people ==
- Chester J. Crandell – former Arizona state senator
- Jesse Horn – author, illustrator and musician

== See also ==
- The Church of Jesus Christ of Latter-day Saints in Arizona
