= Black Canyon Lake (Arizona) =

Lake in Navajo County, Arizona, United States

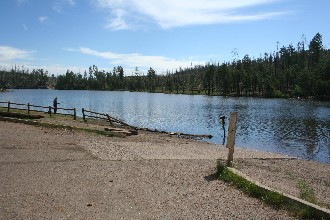
- Black Canyon Lake boat ramp, 2008

- Location within Arizona Location within the United States
- Location: Navajo County, Arizona; United States
- Coordinates: 34°19′50″N 110°42′1″W
- Type: Reservoir
- Primary inflows: Gentry Canyon
- Primary outflows: West Fork Black Canyon
- Basin countries: United States
- Surface area: 78 acres (32 ha)
- Average depth: 35 ft (11 m)
- Max. depth: 60 ft (18 m)
- Surface elevation: 7,060 ft (2,150 m)

Black Canyon Lake is a lake in Navajo County, Arizona, United States.

== Description ==
The lake was built along the Mogollon Rim in 1964 by the Arizona Game and Fish Department to provide water recreation opportunities for the public. Despite being affected by the Rodeo-Chediski Fire in 2002, Black Canyon Lake remains a popular and beautiful spot for picnics, camping and fishing. Since of the fire, the entire area around Black Canyon Lake is open for day use only due to the danger of falling trees. The facilities are maintained by Apache-Sitgreaves National Forests division of the USDA Forest Service.

Black Canyon Lake has 78 acres (32 ha), with a maximum depth of 60 feet (18 m) and an average depth of 35 feet (11 m). Like other Rim lakes, Black Canyon is deep, and historically has been low in nutrients. Because of nutrients from the fire and ash, Black Canyon Lake has been managed as a put-grow-and-take fishery. The Department stocked sub-catchable and catchable-sized rainbow trout in the spring and early summer, with additional catchables stocked in the fall. However, today only catchable-sized rainbow trout are stocked in the lake because of poor water quality. Although some trees around the lake are charred, the perimeter of the lake is forested and scenic.

=== Location ===
The lake is located 18 miles (29 km) southwest of Heber in the Apache-Sitgreaves National Forests at an elevation of 7,060 feet (2,150 m). Access is restricted in the winter when roads are closed due to snow, generally December to early April.

=== Fish species ===
Catchable-sized rainbow trout are the only fish species stock into Black Canyon Lake. However, illegally introduced green sunfish and largemouth bass reproduce in this body of water. Fathead minnows are also found in this reservoir. Crayfish are abundant in Black Canyon Lake as well.
