= Chediski Peak =

Landform in Navajo County, Arizona

Coordinates: 34.183552°N 110.664009°W

Chediski Peak is a mountain located in Navajo County, AZ. It has an elevation of 7,462 feet.

Chediski Peak is known for being the location and namesake of the Rodeo-Chediski fires.
