= Jesse Horn =

American writer and illustrator

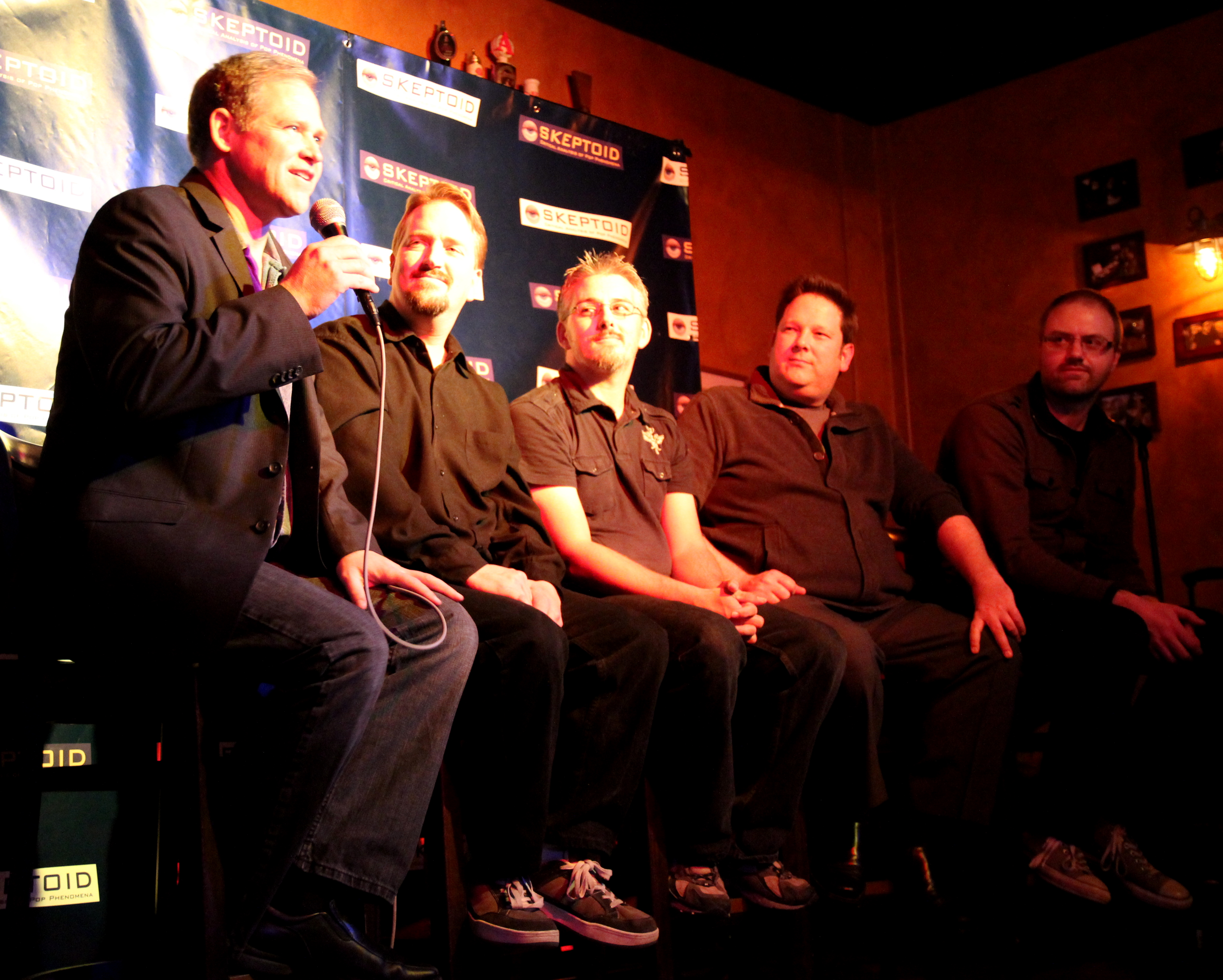
- Horn (center) at a Q & A after the premier of the animated 300th episode of Skeptoid at the University of California, Irvine March 3, 2012
- Born: Jesse Horn; Ojai, California, US
- Occupations: Novelist, musician
- Writing career
- Period: 2011–present
- Genres: Children's literature, non-fiction
- Notable works: Skeptoid's The Secret of the Gypsy Queen, The Secret Files of Jest R. Wicked
- Website: awickedworld.com

Jesse Horn is an American writer and illustrator, best known for his work with Brian Dunning and for illustrating The Secret of the Gypsy Queen, a children's book adapted from the 300th episode of Dunning's Skeptoid podcast.

== Work ==
According to an article by the White Mountain Independent, "Horn possesses wonderful writing skills" and, in addition to his artwork, is "a bass player in a local band."

According to his website, he was the executive editor for the Mogollon Connection Newspaper for many years and now works as a freelance writer for the Flagstaff Business News. His illustrations can also be found in the macabre children's magazine Underneath the Juniper Tree.

Horn has interviewed many notable people and has published several non-fiction books based upon several series that have appeared in the Mogollon Connection and the Oddities magazine. One of these books was about the events surrounding the Rape of Nanking, and is listed as a recommended reading by the Chinese News Digest.

His work can also be seen in the Journal of Emergency Medical Services.

== Personal life ==
According to an article in the Mogollon Rim News, "Jesse was born in Ojai, California to parents James and Dorothy Horn. During his childhood, Jesse's family moved every couple years due to his father's job with the Park Service. They lived in places such as the Rim of the Grand Canyon and Yosemite. According to the Journal of Emergency Medical Services, Horn is a firefighter and paramedic reserve for the Heber-Overgaard and Arizona Fire Department and sits on the White Mountain Child Abuse Prevention Council. In 2016, it was announced on the Skeptoid website that Horn was diagnosed with Glioblastoma grade 4, a deadly brain cancer. Author Catherine Ryan Hyde shared via Facebook that a GoFundMe account was set up in Horn's name to help him and his family with the medical expenses. Artist Gris Grimly wrote on his Facebook page about Horn's cancer, stating "Cancer has impacted yet another life. I met Jesse Horn through my art. He is a creative, good-hearted individual, father and husband. And now he and his family ask for help. There are many people in the world who need financial assistance, and as an individual you can't help everyone. As a new family man myself, I feel an emotional string to stories like this."

== List of works ==
This is a partial list of works Horn has created or been involved with.

=== Books ===
- The Hidden Treasures of Arizona Volume One. Mogollon Connection Publishing LLC (2011)
- The Hidden Treasures of Arizona Volume Two. Mogollon Connection Publishing LLC (2012)
- The Hidden Treasures of Arizona Special Edition. Mogollon Connection Publishing LLC (2012)
- The Ghosts of Nanking. Mogollon Connection Publishing LLC (2011)
- For Our Children. Mogollon Connection Publishing LLC (2012)
- The Secret Files of Jest R. Wicked: Book one the Lost of Spidercreep Hollow. Fyrefly Press (2012)
- The Secret of the Gypsy Queen (Illustrations) Skeptoid Media (2012)
- Cthulhu and the Crawling Chaos: The Nightmares of H.P. Lovecraft - Editor Fyrefly Press (2012)
- The Ultimate Book of Horror: 13 Classic Tales of Horror and Suspense - Editor and Introduction (2013)
- For the Sake of Our Children Special Edition. Fyrefly Press (2016)
- The last Second Guide to Quickly Writing a Research Paper or Reports. Fyrefly Press (2016)
- The Complete Canon of Sherlock Holmes. Fyrefly Classics - Editor (2016)
- The Origin of Species by Means of Natural Selection (Student Special Edition) Kindle Edition (2016)
- The Adventures of Huck Finn Annotated (Student Study Edition) Kindle Edition - Editor Fyrefly Classics (2016)
- Terrible Things. Fyrefly Press (2016)
- 13 Dreadful Things Not to Tell Children in the Dark. Fyrefly Press (2016)
- Treasure Island: Illustrated Annotated Student Study. Edition Fyrefly Classics - Editor (2016)
- The Last Second Guide to: Writing Web Content: Strategies for quickly writing your own web content. Fyrefly Press (2016)
- The Count of Monte Cristo: The Illustrated Annotated Student Study Edition. Fyrefly Classics (2016)
- The Children of the Eternal Darkness - Book One: Vesper Rising co-authored with Melody Whipple. Fyrefly/Kindle Press (2016)
- A House Called Misery. Fyrefly Press (2016)

=== Publications ===
- "Economy Could See Boost from Potash Mining" Flagstaff Business News (2012)
- "Forest Restoration Creating 1,000 Jobs" Flagstaff Business News (2012)
- "Student Debt as the New Mortgage Crisis?" Flagstaff Business News 2013
- April 2012 Issue - "Joe's Intantry" (Illustrations) Underneath the Juniper Tree (2012)
- Spring 2013 Issue - "Scapel Fingers" (Illustrations) Underneath the Juniper Tree (2013)
- Summer 2013 Issue - "Hair" (Illustrations) Underneath the Juniper Tree (2013)
- Fall 2013 Issue - "Gobble Them Up!" (Author/Illustrations) and "Daycare of the Dead" (Illustrations) Underneath the Juniper Tree (2013)
- December 2013 Issue - "Aurora's Snowman" (Author/Illustrations) Underneath the Juniper Tree (2013)
- "The new NFFF Initiative 13 Works to Change Traumatic Incident Response Stigma (author)". Journal of Emergency Medical Services (July 2014)
