= Rodeo–Chediski Fire =

2002 wildfire in Arizona, USA

Coordinates: 34°15′N 110°30′W

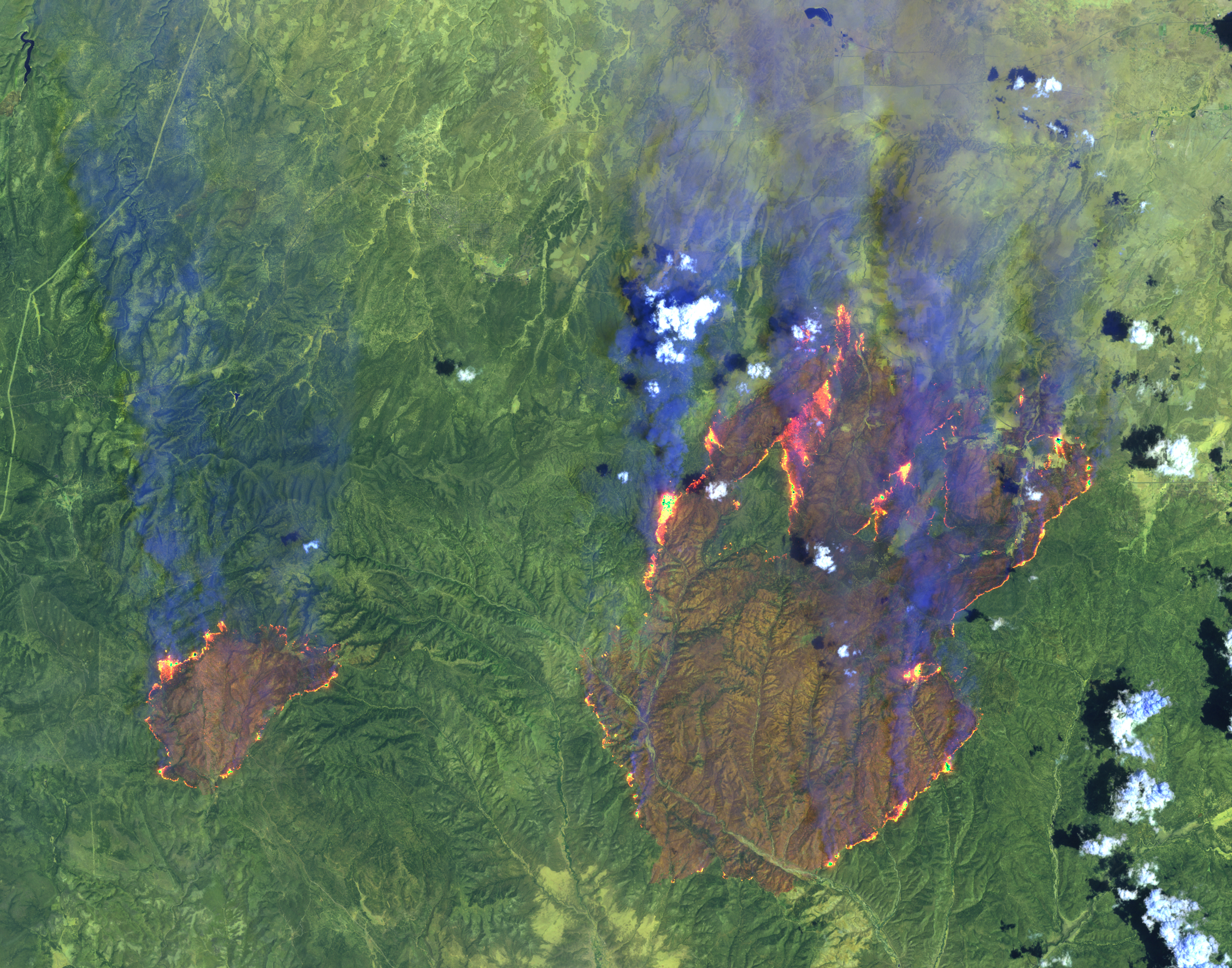
- Rodeo–Chediski fires on June 28, 2002, as seen from the Landsat 7 satellite
- Date: June 18, 2002 –; July 7, 2002
- Location: Coconino and Navajo counties, Arizona

Statistics
- Burned area: 468,638 acres (732.247 sq mi; 189,651 ha)
- Land use: forest, rural

Impacts
- Structures lost: 426

Ignition
- Cause: arson, accidental
- Perpetrators: Leonard Gregg, Valinda Jo Elliott

Map
- Perimeter of Rodeo–Chediski Fire (map data)

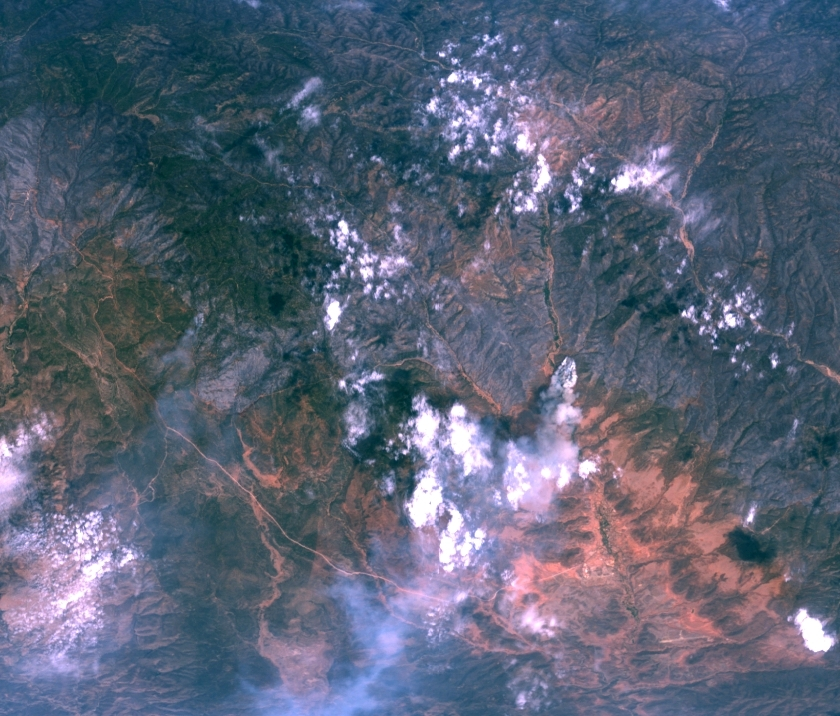
Rodeo–Chediski fires on July 1, 2002, as seen from NASA's ER-2 aircraft

The Rodeo–Chediski Fire was a wildfire that burned in east-central Arizona beginning on June 18, 2002, and was not controlled until July 7. It was the largest forest fire in Arizona's recorded history until June 14, 2011 when the Wallow Fire surpassed it. Several local communities, including Show Low, Pinetop-Lakeside, Heber-Overgaard, Clay Springs, and Pinedale, were threatened and had to be evacuated.

== Origin and development ==
Initially, there were two separate fires. The first fire, the Rodeo, was reported on the afternoon of June 18 near the Rodeo Fairgrounds on the Fort Apache Indian Reservation by Cibecue. An arsonist, Leonard Gregg, was arrested on June 29 and was later charged. By early evening, around 1,200 acres (1.9 sq mi; 490 ha) were ablaze. Increasing wind speeds fed the fire to over 2,000 acres (3.1 sq mi; 810 ha) by the following morning, and when wind speeds increased to around 25 miles per hour (40 km/h) the fire grew rapidly, increasing fourfold over the next three hours.

The Chediski Fire was first reported on the morning of June 20 near Chediski Peak east of Payson. It had been started by a stranded quad rider, Valinda Jo Elliott, trying to signal a news helicopter. Similarly fed by the strong winds, this fire spread to 2,000 acres (3.1 sq mi; 810 ha) by mid-afternoon, and by the following morning it covered over 14,000 acres (22 sq mi; 5,700 ha).

By June 21, the Rodeo Fire had consumed around 150,000 acres (230 sq mi; 61,000 ha). Around 8,000 people were evacuated; by the end of the fire, around 30,000 people would be moved. The two burning areas approached through crosswinds over June 21 and June 22 as a further 11,000 people were ordered to leave their homes. The burning areas joined on June 23 having consumed around 300,000 acres (470 sq mi; 120,000 ha) of woodland.

The fire's progress slowed after the two merged and by June 26 the fire was 5% contained by backburning, line building, and aerial retardant drops – protecting the settlements of Clay Springs, Linden and Pinedale, but 462,600 acres (722.8 sq mi; 187,200 ha) had burned. The fire was 28% contained by June 28, but it was not fully under control until July 7 at a cost of $43.1 million. 465 homes were destroyed in Pinedale and other small communities. The fire was declared a disaster area. RodeoFire.com was established at the fire's onset as a portal for concerned citizens and family members acting as an event update website.

== Aftermath ==
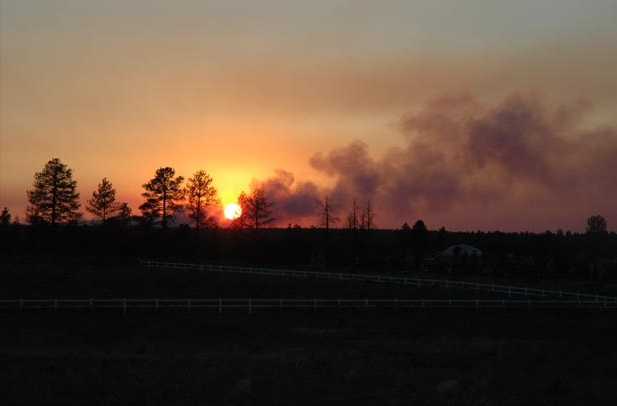
A view of the fire from Bison Ranch in Heber-Overgaard, Arizona

=== Restoration ===
Of the woodlands affected, 280,992 acres (439.050 sq mi; 113,713 ha) (60.0%) was part of the Fort Apache Indian Reservation. Of the rest, 167,215 acres (261.273 sq mi; 67,670 ha) (35.7%) was in the Apache–Sitgreaves National Forests and 10,667 acres (16.667 sq mi; 4,317 ha) (2.3%) in the Tonto National Forest. The remaining destruction occurred on private land. The fire damaged or destroyed ecosystem resources, disrupted hydrologic functioning, and altered the loadings of flammable fuels on much of the ponderosa pine forest that was exposed to the burn.

After the fire, efforts were made to stabilize the landscape by burned area emergency response teams. Waterbars, wattles and K-rails were put in place and there were over two weeks of aerial seeding, dropping around 50,000,000 pounds (23,000 t) of winter wheat or indigenous grass seeds over 180,000 acres (280 sq mi; 73,000 ha).

=== Political consequences ===
Political figures, including Senator Jon Kyl of Arizona, blamed the fire on "radical environmentalists" and their opposition to logging to thin the forests. The Sierra Club responded by saying they have long supported the thinning of underbrush and small trees through controlled burns, not the logging of large trees. But this fire, among other devastating drought-year fires in the American West, helped propel new forest management laws, enacted by both the U.S. Congress and local authorities. Of these the most notable is the Healthy Forests Restoration Act, which President George W. Bush signed into law in 2003. Although these policies presented high-profile, short-term solutions, the ecological effects of these policies are hotly debated among forestry experts.

=== Legal actions ===
The arsonist, who received a 10-year prison sentence in March 2004, was Leonard Gregg, a Cibecue resident who worked as a seasonal firefighter for the tribal fire department. He told investigators he had set two fires that morning (the first was quickly put out) in hopes of getting hired by the federal Bureau of Indian Affairs for a quick-response fire crew. Gregg had previously worked as a BIA fire crew member, and was indeed among the first to be called in to fight the Rodeo Fire.

The stranded motorist, Valinda Jo Elliott, who started the Chediski portion of the fire was not charged with arson by the US Attorney's office, much to the anger of local residents and the tribe. In 2009, a judge ruled that she is eligible to be tried in a civil suit in the White Mountain Apache tribal court. In 2014 the court ruled that she was liable for $1650 in civil penalties and $57,000,000 in restitution to the tribe.

== Fire Progression Table ==
This table reflects the approximate size of the fire each day.

Disclaimer: Due to the fact that mapping technology was not as accurate back in 2002, data is not exact.

Total Size Daily
| Date | Total Size (acres) |
|---|---|
| June 18 | 1,200 |
| June 19 | 55,000 |
| June 20 | 134,000 |
| June 21 | 166,000 |
| June 22 | 250,000 |
| June 23 | 300,000 |

Size per fire (Until June 21)

| Date | Size (Rodeo) | Size (Chediski) |
|---|---|---|
| June 18 | 1,200 | N/A |
| June 19 | 55,000 | N/A |
| June 20 | 120,000 | 14,000 |
| June 21 | 150,000 | 16,000 |

== See also ==
- Hayman Fire of 2002, a concurrent large wildfire in Colorado
