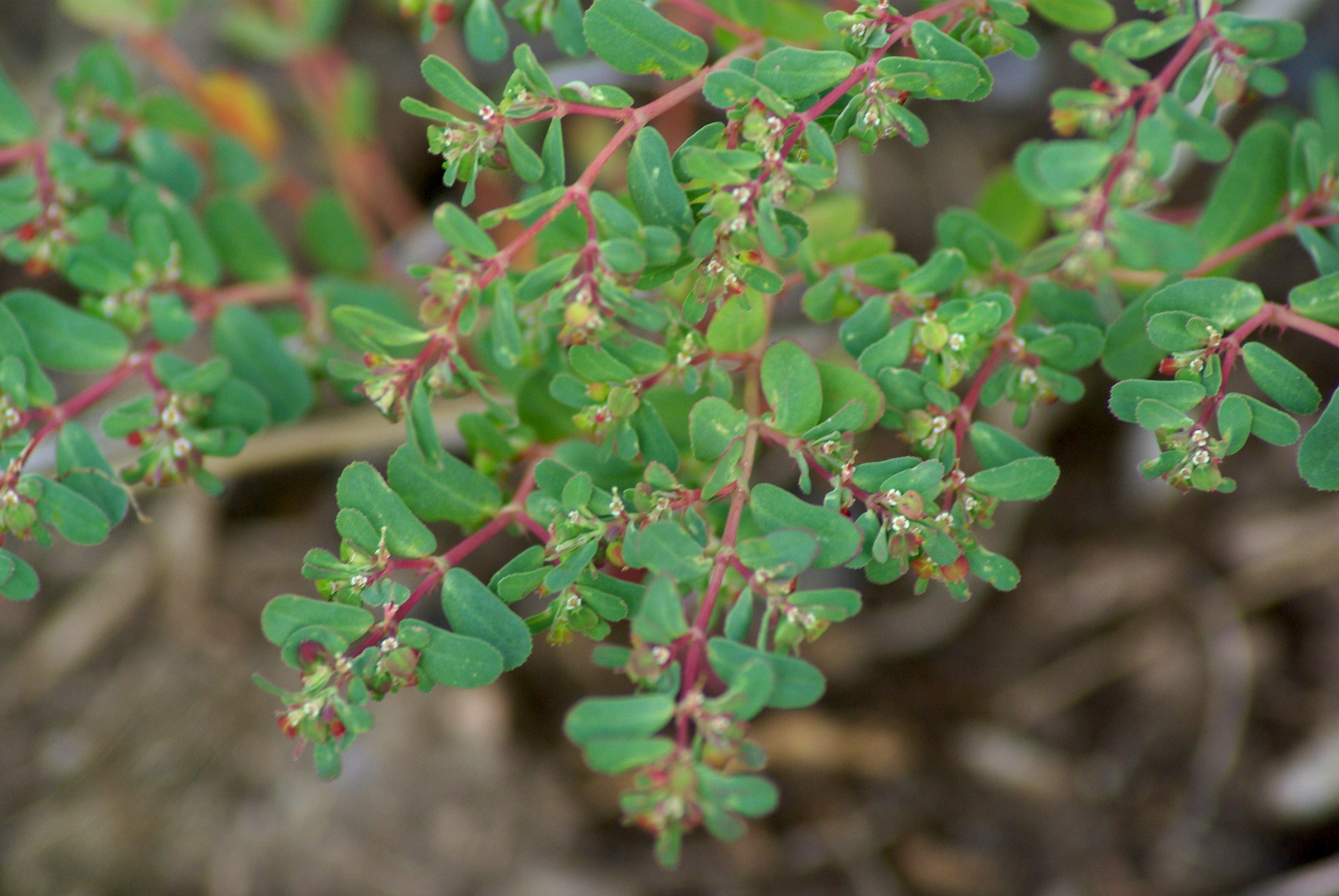

Scientific classification
- Kingdom: Plantae
- Clade: Tracheophytes
- Clade: Angiosperms
- Clade: Eudicots
- Clade: Rosids
- Order: Malpighiales
- Family: Euphorbiaceae
- Genus: Euphorbia
- Species: E. serpyllifolia

Binomial name
- Euphorbia serpyllifolia Pers.

Subspecies
- E. serpyllifolia subsp. hirtula; E. serpyllifolia subsp. serpyllifolia

Synonyms
- Anisophyllum novomexicanum Klotzsch & Garcke; Chamaesyce aequata Lunell; Chamaesyce albicaulis (Rydb.) Rydb.; Chamaesyce consanguinea Millsp.; Chamaesyce erecta Lunell; Chamaesyce neomexicana (Greene) Standl.; Chamaesyce occidentalis (Drew) Millsp.; Chamaesyce rugulosa (Engelm. ex Millsp.) Rydb.; Chamaesyce serpyllifolia (Pers.) Small; Euphorbia albicaulis Rydb.; Euphorbia consanguinea Engelm. ex Boiss. nom. illeg.; Euphorbia neomexicana Greene; Euphorbia notata Engelm. ex Boiss. nom. illeg.; Euphorbia novomexicana (Klotzsch & Garcke) L.C.Wheeler; Euphorbia occidentalis Drew; Euphorbia rugulosa (Engelm. ex Millsp.) Greene; Euphorbia subserrata Engelm. ex Boiss. nom. illeg.

= Euphorbia serpyllifolia =

Species of flowering plant

Euphorbia serpyllifolia (Euphorbia serpillifolia (Note: The original spelling of the name, E. serpillifolia has generally been "corrected" to E. serpyllifolia, although that correction is not in accord with article 60 of the International Code of Nomenclature for algae, fungi, and plants.)) is a species of euphorb known by the common names thymeleaf sandmat or thyme-leafed spurge. It is native to a large part of North America from Canada to Mexico, where it is a common member of the flora in many types of habitat. This is an annual herb growing as a prostrate mat or taking a somewhat erect form. The oblong leaves are up to about 1.5 centimeters long, sometimes hairy and finely toothed along the edges. The tiny inflorescence is a cyathium about a millimeter wide. It bears scalloped white petal-like appendages arranged around the actual flowers. At the center are several male flowers and one female flower, which develops into a lobed, oval fruit up to 2 millimeters wide. This plant has a number of traditional medicinal uses for many Native American groups.

== Subspecies ==
- Euphorbia serpyllifolia subsp. hirtula is limited to California and Baja California.
- Euphorbia serpyllifolia subsp. serpyllifolia has far wider distribution throughout much of North America with a gap in interior eastern states of the United States.

== Uses ==
The Zuni people use it as a cathartic, an emetic, and to increase the flow of milk in a breastfeeding mother. The leaves are used to sweeten corn meal and chewed for the pleasant taste.
