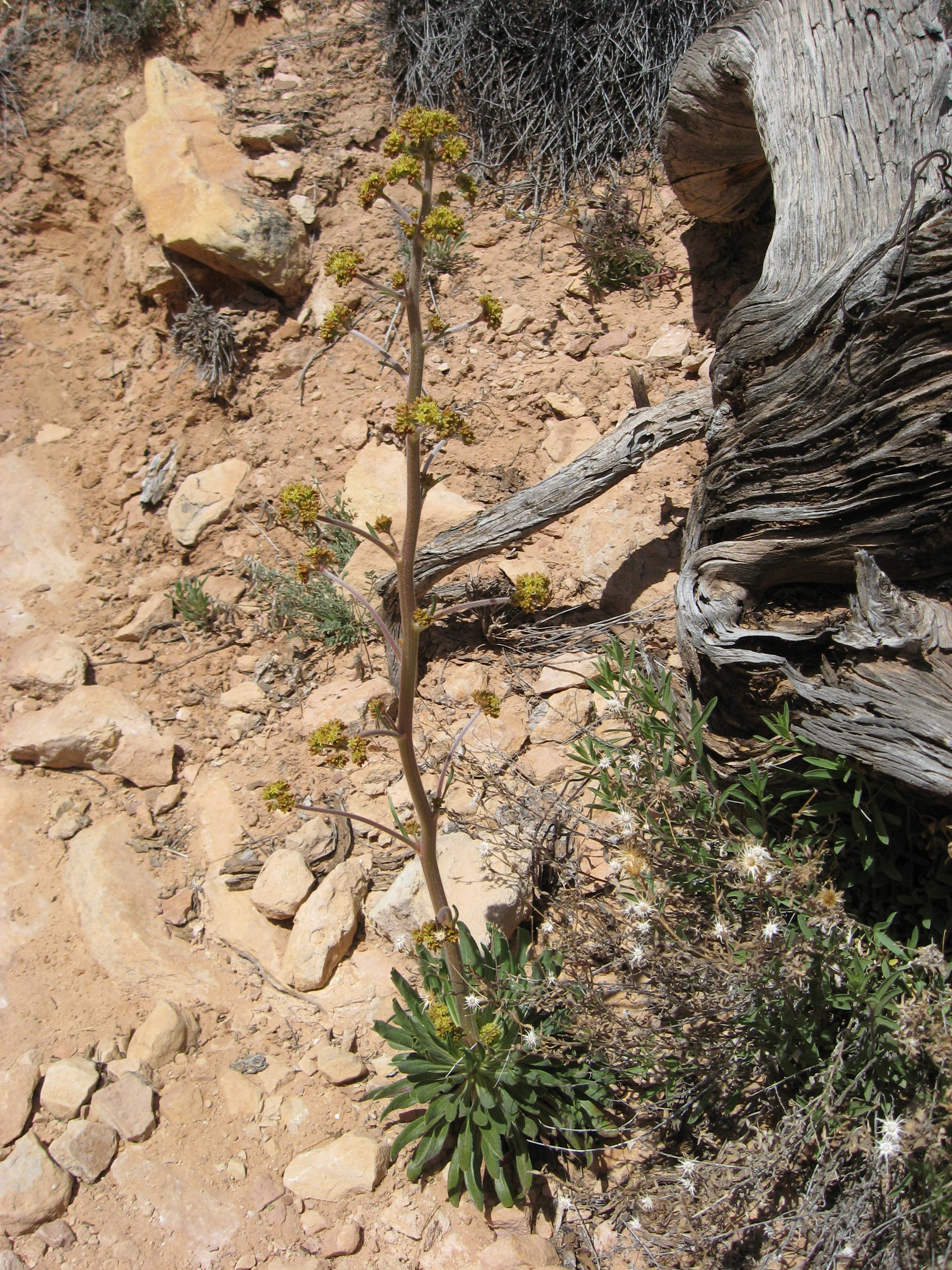
- On Cedar Mesa in Grand Gulch Primitive Area, southwestern Utah

Conservation status
- Secure (NatureServe)

Scientific classification
- Kingdom: Plantae
- Clade: Embryophytes
- Clade: Tracheophytes
- Clade: Angiosperms
- Clade: Eudicots
- Order: Caryophyllales
- Family: Polygonaceae
- Genus: Eriogonum
- Species: E. alatum

Binomial name
- Eriogonum alatum Torr.

Varieties
- E. a. var. alatum; E. a. var. glabriusculum

Synonyms
- Eriogonum triste; Pterogonum alatum

= Eriogonum alatum =

Species of wild buckwheat

Eriogonum alatum, with the common names winged buckwheat and winged eriogonum, is a species of buckwheat.

The plant is native to the western Great Plains, the Southwestern United States, and Chihuahua state in México.

== Taxonomy ==
In 1853 Eriogonum alatum was scientifically described and named by John Torrey, placing it in the Eriogonum genus. Hugo Gross proposed moving it to Pterogonum in 1913, but this has not become the accepted classification. Together with its genus it is part of the Polygonaceae family and the species has two accepted varieties.

- Eriogonum alatum var. alatum – Widespread from Wyoming to Chihuahua
- Eriogonum alatum var. glabriusculum – Native to New Mexico, Texas, and Oklahoma

Eriogonum alatum has eight synonyms, two of the species and six of variety alatum.

Table of Synonyms
Name	Year	Rank	Synonym of:	Notes
Eriogonum alatum var. brevifolium Gand.	1906	variety	var. alatum	= het.
Eriogonum alatum var. macdougalii Gand.	1906	variety	var. alatum	= het.
Eriogonum alatum subsp. mogollense (S.Stokes ex M.E.Jones) S.Stokes	1936	subspecies	var. alatum	= het.
Eriogonum alatum var. mogollense S.Stokes ex M.E.Jones	1903	variety	var. alatum	= het.
Eriogonum alatum subsp. triste (S.Watson) S.Stokes	1936	subspecies	var. alatum	= het.
Eriogonum alatum subsp. typicum S.Stokes	1936	subspecies	E. alatum	≡ hom., not validly publ.
Eriogonum triste S.Watson	1875	species	var. alatum	= het.
Pterogonum alatum (Torr.) H.Gross	1913	species	E. alatum	≡ hom.
Notes: ≡ homotypic synonym; = heterotypic synonym

== Uses ==
Among the Zuni people, the root is eaten as an emetic for stomachaches. An infusion of the powdered root is taken after a fall and to relieve general misery.
