= Clay Springs, Arizona =

CDP in Navajo County, Arizona

- Census-designated place (CDP)
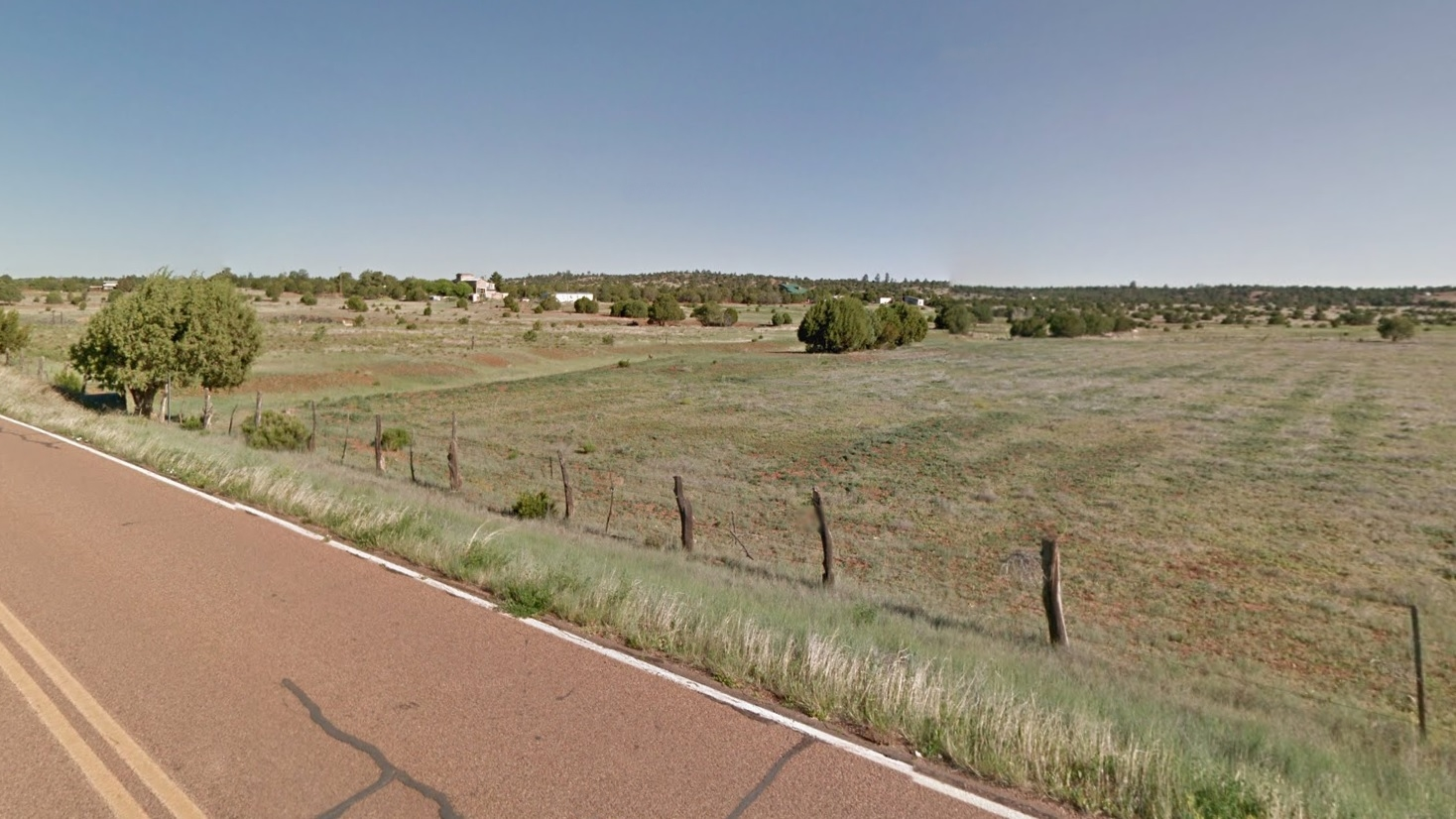

- Location of Clay Springs in Navajo County, Arizona.

- Location within Arizona Location within the United States
- Coordinates: 34°21′33″N 110°18′16″W
- Country: United States
- State: Arizona
- County: Navajo

Area
  - Total: 2.85 sq mi (7.37 km^{2})
  - Land: 2.85 sq mi (7.37 km^{2})
  - Water: 0 sq mi (0.00 km^{2})
- Elevation: 6,306 ft (1,922 m)

Population (2020)
  - Total: 331
  - Density: 116/sq mi (44.9/km^{2})
- Time zone: UTC-7 (Mountain (MST))
- ZIP code: 85923
- Area code: 928
- FIPS code: 04-00
- GNIS ID(s): 2582759

Clay Springs is a census-designated place (CDP) in Navajo County, Arizona, United States. Clay Springs is 16 miles (26 km) northwest of Show Low. Clay Springs has a post office with ZIP code 85923.

== Demographics ==
Historical population
Census	Pop.	Note	%±
2010	401		—
2020	331		−17.5%
U.S. Decennial Census

As of the census of 2010, there were 401 people, 124 households, and 91 families residing in the CDP.

== Climate ==
According to the Köppen Climate Classification system, Clay Springs has a cool-summer Mediterranean climate, abbreviated Csb on climate maps. Winters are very cold at night and cool to cold during the day, with on average 3.7 nights below 0 °F or −17.8 °C and 171.1 nights below 32 °F or 0 °C. April to June warms up and is generally the driest part of the year before monsoon storms hit between July and mid-September. Typically 17 days will hit 90 °F or 32.2 °C, but minima are generally not above 68 °F or 20 °C due to the altitude.

Climate data for Clay Springs, Arizona (1971-1987)
Month	Jan	Feb	Mar	Apr	May	Jun	Jul	Aug	Sep	Oct	Nov	Dec	Year
Record high °F (°C)	68 (20)	72 (22)	74 (23)	82 (28)	90 (32)	100 (38)	97 (36)	95 (35)	90 (32)	89 (32)	78 (26)	68 (20)	100 (38)
Mean daily maximum °F (°C)	45.3 (7.4)	50.0 (10.0)	54.9 (12.7)	64.2 (17.9)	72.2 (22.3)	83.7 (28.7)	86.3 (30.2)	83.4 (28.6)	77.2 (25.1)	67.3 (19.6)	55.2 (12.9)	47.7 (8.7)	65.6 (18.7)
Mean daily minimum °F (°C)	18.7 (−7.4)	20.8 (−6.2)	26.4 (−3.1)	30.5 (−0.8)	37.1 (2.8)	47.3 (8.5)	54.5 (12.5)	54.1 (12.3)	46.1 (7.8)	35.4 (1.9)	25.7 (−3.5)	19.1 (−7.2)	34.6 (1.4)
Record low °F (°C)	−17 (−27)	−15 (−26)	−2 (−19)	11 (−12)	13 (−11)	28 (−2)	34 (1)	40 (4)	26 (−3)	10 (−12)	−21 (−29)	−22 (−30)	−22 (−30)
Average precipitation inches (mm)	1.33 (34)	1.35 (34)	1.91 (49)	0.58 (15)	0.94 (24)	0.31 (7.9)	2.30 (58)	2.33 (59)	2.07 (53)	1.61 (41)	1.65 (42)	1.47 (37)	17.85 (453.9)
Average precipitation days (≥ 0.01 inch)	6	5	8	4	4	2	9	9	6	4	5	5	67
Source: Western Regional Climate Center

== Transportation ==
Mountain Valley Shuttle stops in Clay Springs on its Phoenix-Show Low route.
