= Show Low, Arizona =

City in Arizona, United States

Show Low
- City
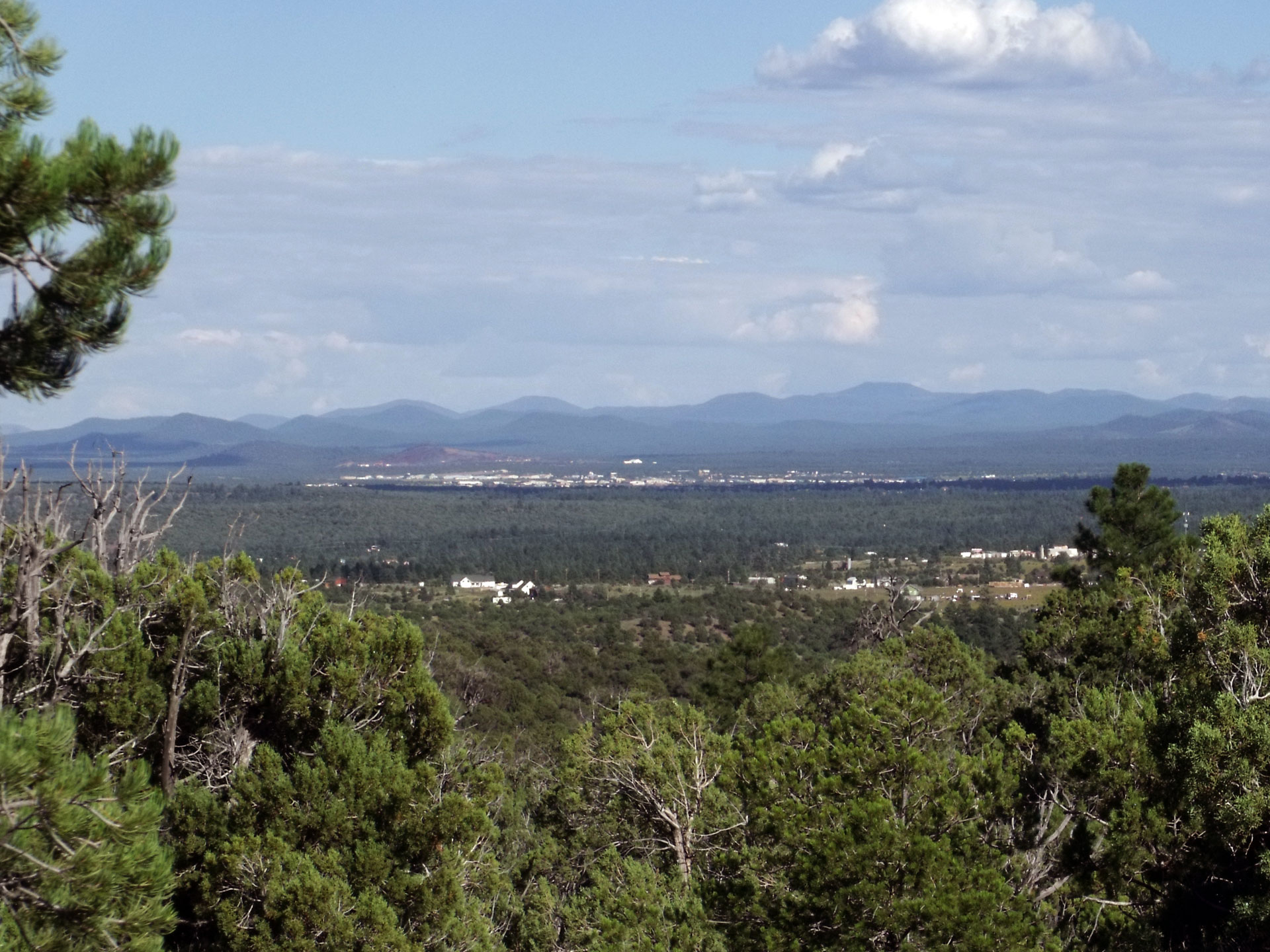

- Flag
- Motto: "Named By The Turn Of A Card"
- Location of Show Low in Navajo County, Arizona

- Location in United States
- Coordinates: 34°14′37″N 110°02′53″W
- Country: United States
- State: Arizona
- County: Navajo
- Founded: 1870
- Incorporated: 1953

Government
  - Type: Council–Manager
  - Body: Show Low City Council
  - Mayor: John Leech

Area
  - Total: 65.98 sq mi (170.88 km^{2})
  - Land: 65.51 sq mi (169.66 km^{2})
  - Water: 0.47 sq mi (1.23 km^{2})
- Elevation: 6,349 ft (1,935 m)

Population (2020)
  - Total: 11,732
  - Density: 179.1/sq mi (69.15/km^{2})
- Time zone: UTC−7 (Mountain)
  - Summer (DST): UTC−7 (no DST/PDT)
- ZIP Codes: 85901, 85902, 85911
- Area code: 928
- FIPS code: 04-66470
- GNIS ID(s): 2411895
- Major airport: Show Low Regional Airport
- Website: www.showlowaz.gov

Show Low is a city in Navajo County, Arizona. It lies on the Mogollon Rim in east central Arizona, at an elevation of 6,345 feet (1,934 m). The city was established in 1870 and incorporated in 1953. According to the 2020 United States census, the population of the city was 11,732.

== Name and history ==
According to a legend, the city's unusual name resulted from a marathon poker game between Corydon E. Cooley and Marion Clark. The two men were equal partners in a 100,000-acre (400 km^{2}) ranch; however, the partners determined that there was not enough room for both of them in their settlement, and agreed to settle the issue over a game of "Seven Up" (with the winner taking the ranch and the loser leaving). After the game seemed to have no winner in sight, Clark said, "If you can show low, you win." In response, Cooley turned up the deuce of clubs (the lowest possible card) and replied, "Show low it is." As a tribute to the legend, Show Low's main street is named "Deuce of Clubs" in remembrance.

In 2002, a large forest fire, the Rodeo–Chediski Fire, threatened the city and forced an evacuation. The fire was extinguished less than a half mile from the city's border, and Show Low was completely spared. The city is near extensive forests, and is a popular recreational area.

== Geography ==
According to the United States Census Bureau, the city has a total area of 27.9 square miles (72 km^{2}), of which 27.9 square miles (72 km^{2}) is land and 0.1 square miles (0.26 km^{2}) (0.25%) is water.

=== Climate ===
Winters in Show Low bring highs between 45 °F (7 °C) and 55 °F (13 °C), with lows usually below freezing between November and March, averaging in the 20s December through February, and in the low 30s for November and March.

In the summer, highs in Show Low average approximately 85 °F (29 °C), with an occasional day above 90 °F (32 °C) not uncommon for the city. As the sun sets in the summertime, temperatures plummet dramatically, sometimes upwards of 30 °F (17 °C). This nightly temperature swing results in summertime lows typically ranging between 50 °F (10 °C) and 60 °F (16 °C).

Show Low has reached below-freezing temperatures every month at least once in its history except July and August, where temperatures have only reached 38 °F (3 °C) and 37 °F (3 °C) respectively.

Show Low has twice reached 100 °F (38 °C), its record high temperature: once on May 31, 1969, and again on July 14, 2003. Show Low's record low temperature of -25 °F (-32 °C) was set on January 8, 1971.

Show Low averages about 15.7 inches (400 mm) of rain per year.

The city has a Mediterranean climate (Köppen Csa). Unlike most locations with this climate, but similar to most of Arizona, the rainfall maximum is in the summer due to the North American Monsoon.

Climate data for Show Low Airport, Arizona (1991–2020 normals, extremes 1984–present)
| Month | Jan | Feb | Mar | Apr | May | Jun | Jul | Aug | Sep | Oct | Nov | Dec | Year |
|---|---|---|---|---|---|---|---|---|---|---|---|---|---|
| Record high °F (°C) | 69 (21) | 71 (22) | 80 (27) | 84 (29) | 94 (34) | 98 (37) | 100 (38) | 97 (36) | 93 (34) | 86 (30) | 76 (24) | 68 (20) | 100 (38) |
| Mean maximum °F (°C) | 59.4 (15.2) | 63.9 (17.7) | 70.9 (21.6) | 77.2 (25.1) | 85.5 (29.7) | 93.3 (34.1) | 94.5 (34.7) | 90.9 (32.7) | 86.9 (30.5) | 79.9 (26.6) | 70.0 (21.1) | 61.4 (16.3) | 95.5 (35.3) |
| Mean daily maximum °F (°C) | 46.0 (7.8) | 51.0 (10.6) | 58.0 (14.4) | 64.9 (18.3) | 73.6 (23.1) | 83.9 (28.8) | 85.3 (29.6) | 82.8 (28.2) | 78.3 (25.7) | 68.1 (20.1) | 56.4 (13.6) | 45.8 (7.7) | 66.2 (19.0) |
| Daily mean °F (°C) | 34.8 (1.6) | 38.9 (3.8) | 44.7 (7.1) | 50.9 (10.5) | 59.0 (15.0) | 68.8 (20.4) | 72.2 (22.3) | 70.2 (21.2) | 65.1 (18.4) | 54.3 (12.4) | 43.7 (6.5) | 34.6 (1.4) | 53.1 (11.7) |
| Mean daily minimum °F (°C) | 23.6 (−4.7) | 26.8 (−2.9) | 31.3 (−0.4) | 36.8 (2.7) | 44.5 (6.9) | 53.7 (12.1) | 59.2 (15.1) | 57.7 (14.3) | 52.0 (11.1) | 40.6 (4.8) | 31.0 (−0.6) | 23.4 (−4.8) | 40.1 (4.5) |
| Mean minimum °F (°C) | 4.8 (−15.1) | 10.9 (−11.7) | 17.1 (−8.3) | 22.9 (−5.1) | 31.3 (−0.4) | 41.6 (5.3) | 52.2 (11.2) | 50.6 (10.3) | 39.4 (4.1) | 24.4 (−4.2) | 14.0 (−10.0) | 4.9 (−15.1) | 1.6 (−16.9) |
| Record low °F (°C) | −14 (−26) | −11 (−24) | 5 (−15) | 12 (−11) | 23 (−5) | 33 (1) | 40 (4) | 38 (3) | 29 (−2) | 6 (−14) | 1 (−17) | −22 (−30) | −22 (−30) |
| Average precipitation inches (mm) | 1.35 (34) | 1.16 (29) | 0.91 (23) | 0.57 (14) | 0.62 (16) | 0.42 (11) | 2.35 (60) | 2.97 (75) | 1.44 (37) | 1.35 (34) | 1.19 (30) | 1.37 (35) | 15.70 (399) |
| Average snowfall inches (cm) | 4.0 (10) | 3.8 (9.7) | 2.3 (5.8) | 1.6 (4.1) | 0.0 (0.0) | 0.0 (0.0) | 0.0 (0.0) | 0.0 (0.0) | 0.0 (0.0) | 0.4 (1.0) | 1.9 (4.8) | 5.4 (14) | 19.4 (49) |
| Average precipitation days (≥ 0.01 in) | 6.9 | 6.5 | 5.7 | 4.1 | 4.3 | 2.9 | 12.9 | 14.9 | 7.4 | 5.6 | 4.7 | 6.5 | 82.4 |
| Average snowy days (≥ 0.1 in) | 2.0 | 1.6 | 0.9 | 0.5 | 0.0 | 0.0 | 0.0 | 0.0 | 0.0 | 0.2 | 0.9 | 1.7 | 7.8 |
Source: NOAA

== Demographics ==
Historical population
| Census | Pop. | Note | %± |
|---|---|---|---|
| 1910 | 201 | | — |
| 1920 | 258 | | 28.4% |
| 1930 | 315 | | 22.1% |
| 1960 | 1,625 | | — |
| 1970 | 2,129 | | 31.0% |
| 1980 | 4,298 | | 101.9% |
| 1990 | 5,019 | | 16.8% |
| 2000 | 7,695 | | 53.3% |
| 2010 | 10,660 | | 38.5% |
| 2020 | 11,732 | | 10.1% |
U.S. Decennial Census

=== Racial and ethnic composition ===
Show Low city, Arizona – Racial composition Note: the US Census treats Hispanic/Latino as an ethnic category. This table excludes Latinos from the racial categories and assigns them to a separate category. Hispanics/Latinos may be of any race.
| Race (NH = Non-Hispanic) | 2020 | 2010 | 2000 | 1990 | 1980 |
|---|---|---|---|---|---|
| White alone (NH) | 75.4% (8,848) | 80.5% (8,586) | 83.7% (6,441) | 90.2% (4,529) | 88.9% (3,820) |
| Black alone (NH) | 0.4% (43) | 0.4% (42) | 0.2% (19) | 0.2% (9) | 0% (0) |
| American Indian alone (NH) | 4.1% (480) | 3.8% (406) | 3.5% (270) | 3.2% (163) | 5.8% (248) |
| Asian alone (NH) | 1.2% (141) | 0.7% (79) | 0.6% (50) | 0.4% (18) | 0.1% (6) |
| Pacific Islander alone (NH) | 0% (5) | 0.1% (10) | 0% (3) | | |
| Other race alone (NH) | 0.3% (39) | 0% (2) | 0% (2) | 0% (1) | 0% (0) |
| Multiracial (NH) | 3.8% (445) | 1.6% (175) | 1.5% (115) | — | — |
| Hispanic/Latino (any race) | 14.8% (1,731) | 12.8% (1,360) | 10.3% (795) | 6% (299) | 5.2% (224) |

=== 2020 census ===
As of the 2020 census, Show Low had a population of 11,732. The median age was 44.7 years. 22.2% of residents were under the age of 18 and 25.3% of residents were 65 years of age or older. For every 100 females there were 94.5 males, and for every 100 females age 18 and over there were 93.1 males age 18 and over.

87.1% of residents lived in urban areas, while 12.9% lived in rural areas.

There were 4,926 households in Show Low, of which 27.4% had children under the age of 18 living in them. Of all households, 48.9% were married-couple households, 18.0% were households with a male householder and no spouse or partner present, and 26.7% were households with a female householder and no spouse or partner present. About 28.3% of all households were made up of individuals and 15.5% had someone living alone who was 65 years of age or older.

There were 8,365 housing units, of which 41.1% were vacant. The homeowner vacancy rate was 6.0% and the rental vacancy rate was 9.9%.

=== 2000 census ===
As of the census of 2000, there were 7,695 people, 2,885 households, and 2,117 families residing in the city. The population density was 859 inhabitants per square mile (332/km^{2}). There were 7186 housing units at an average density of 155.7 per square mile (60.1/km^{2}). The racial makeup of the city was 90.3% White, 0.4% Black or African American, 3.2% Native American, 0.5% Asian, 0.1% Pacific Islander, 3.4% from other races, and 2.2% from two or more races. 9.4% of the population were Hispanic or Latino of any race.

There were 2,885 households, out of which 34.8% had children under the age of 18 living with them, 58.2% were married couples living together, 11.1% had a female householder with no husband present, and 26.6% were non-families. 21.9% of all households were made up of individuals, and 9.5% had someone living alone who was 65 years of age or older. The average household size was 2.62 and the average family size was 3.04.

In the city, the population was spread out, with 29.2% under the age of 18, 7.4% from 18 to 24, 24.9% from 25 to 44, 23.5% from 45 to 64, and 15.0% who were 65 years of age or older. The median age was 37 years. For every 100 females, there were 95.1 males. For every 100 females age 18 and over, there were 88.5 males.

The median income for a household in the city was $32,356, and the median income for a family was $36,397. Males had a median income of $28,882 versus $24,590 for females. The per capita income for the city was $15,536. About 11.7% of families and 15.0% of the population were below the poverty line, including 23.6% of those under age 18 and 6.0% of those age 65 or over.

== Transportation ==
Show Low Regional Airport (IATA: SOW, ICAO: KSOW) provides passenger airline service Contour Airlines to Phoenix. The airport maintains a single passenger terminal for this purpose. The airport is also commonly used for air cargo, air-taxi, and as a fixed-base operator for general aviation.

The city also maintains a minor public transportation operation in conjunction with neighboring Pinetop-Lakeside. Two shuttles service multiple retail, high-traffic, and government offices and also the airport and nearby Hon-Dah casino (57 stops in all). The city also operates the White Mountain Connection bus, which serves Pinetop-Lakeside, Taylor, Snowflake, and Holbrook.

== Education ==
Almost all of the city is a part of the Show Low Unified School District. A portion of the city is within the boundaries of the Blue Ridge Unified School District.

Schools that serve the SLUSD portion of the city include Linden Elementary, Nikolaus Homestead Elementary, Whipple Ranch Elementary, White Mountain Institute, Show Low Junior High School, and Show Low High School.

Additionally St. Anthony School (K-8) of the Roman Catholic Diocese of Gallup is in Show Low. Circa 2009 it covered to grade 4. As of that time it was adding the 5th grade the following year and adding another grade each year until grade 8.

Show Low is home to one of Northland Pioneer College's four regional campuses, the White Mountain Campus.

== Economy ==
=== Top employers ===
According to the city's 2014 Comprehensive Annual Financial Report, the top employers in the city are:

| # | Employer | # of Employees |
|---|---|---|
| 1 | Summit Healthcare Regional Medical Center | 900 |
| 2 | Walmart | 490 |
| 3 | Show Low Unified School District | 300 |
| 4 | Cellular One | 187 |
| 5 | City of Show Low | 153 |
| 6 | The Home Depot | 150 |
| 7 | Citizens Telecommunications Company of the White Mountains | 125 |
| 8 | Northland Pioneer College | 110 |
| 9 | Lowe's | 108 |
| 10 | Tate's Auto Group | 70 |

== Notable people ==
- Doug Mathis, former Major League Baseball relief pitcher for the Texas Rangers organization
- Paul Ulibarri, professional disc golfer and 2006 PDGA Amateur Disc Golf World Champion

== Nearest cities and towns ==
- Clay Springs
- Linden
- McNary
- Pinedale
- Pinetop-Lakeside
- Snowflake
- Taylor
- Vernon
