= Linden, Arizona =

Unincorporated community in the state of Arizona, United States

- Location of Linden in Navajo County, Arizona.

- Location in the United States
- Coordinates: 34°15′45″N 110°08′33″W
- Country: United States
- State: Arizona
- Counties: Navajo

Area
  - Total: 30.21 sq mi (78.24 km^{2})
  - Land: 30.20 sq mi (78.22 km^{2})
  - Water: 0.0039 sq mi (0.01 km^{2})
- Elevation: 6,539 ft (1,993 m)

Population (2010)
  - Total: 2,597
  - Density: 91.4/sq mi (35.28/km^{2})
- Time zone: UTC-7 (MST)
- ZIP code: 85901
- Area code: 928
- FIPS code: 04-41085
- GNIS feature ID: 2582815

Linden is an unincorporated community located in Navajo County, Arizona, United States, just west of the city of Show Low. It is situated atop the Mogollon Rim at an elevation of over 6,000 feet. The community was evacuated in June 2002 due to the Rodeo-Chediski fire, which eventually consumed part of Linden, destroying a number of homes.

Linden is generally made up of larger ranches and rural subdivisions, including Cheney Ranch and Timberland Acres. As an unincorporated community with few businesses, many Linden residents make their livings in or around the city of Show Low.

Linden's former fire district has been merged into the Timber Mesa Fire and Medical District, along with those of Show Low and Lakeside. Law enforcement is performed by Navajo County Sheriff's Office and Arizona Department of Public Safety.

== Geography ==
State Route 260 runs through Linden and is the main vein of the community. Linden is characterized by open fields and gently rolling hills. Chief among the flora are Ponderosa Pine, Pinyon pine, Gambel oak, and numerous Shaggy bark and Alligator Junipers.

== Demographics ==
Historical population
Census	Pop.	Note	%±
2010	2,597		—
U.S. Decennial Census

The community was first recorded as a census-designated place for the 2010 census. Its population was 2,597.

== Education ==
Show Low Unified School District serves Linden.

Linden contains Linden Elementary School, a K-6 elementary school satellite campus of the district. Linden residents continue on to Show Low Junior High School and Show Low High School.

== Historic site ==
Roundy Crossing is the name of a Mogollon archeological site which contains astronomical petroglyphs depicting the winter sky dating to 1168 AD. A one-day alignment of the planets was extensively recorded. Excavation of the site has found a pueblo, kiva, ramada, and plaza.
