= KSOW =

KSOW may refer to:

- KSOW-LP, a radio station in Oregon, United States
- Show Low Regional Airport (ICAO code KSOW)
