= Doug Mathis =

American baseball player & coach (born 1983)

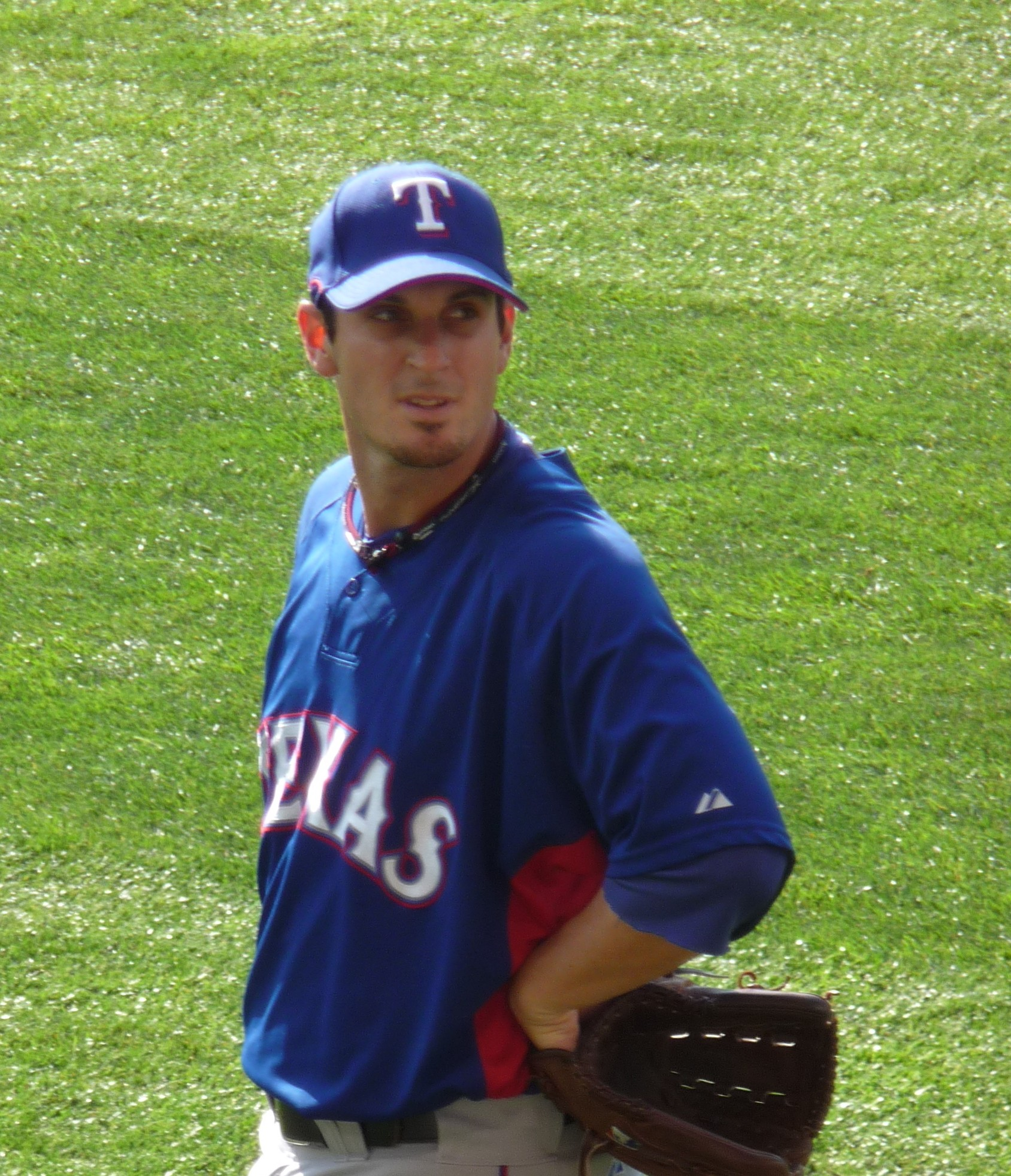
- Mathis with the Texas Rangers

Toros de Tijuana
- Pitcher / Coach
- Born: June 7, 1983 (age 43); Phoenix, Arizona, U.S.
- Batted: Left Threw: Right

Professional debut
- MLB: May 12, 2008, for the Texas Rangers
- KBO: 2011, for the Samsung Lions
- NPB: 2012, for the Chiba Lotte Marines
- CPBL: 2015, for the Uni-President 7-Eleven Lions

Last appearance
- MLB: July 24, 2010, for the Texas Rangers
- KBO: 2011, for the Samsung Lions
- NPB: September 15, 2012, for the Chiba Lotte Marines
- CPBL: 2015, for the Uni-President 7-Eleven Lions

MLB statistics
- Win–loss record: 3–3
- Earned run average: 4.84
- Strikeouts: 44

KBO statistics
- Win–loss record: 5–2
- Earned run average: 2.52
- Strikeouts: 32

NPB statistics
- Win–loss record: 1–4
- Earned run average: 6.49
- Strikeouts: 14

CPBL statistics
- Win–loss record: 5–5
- Earned run average: 4.03
- Strikeouts: 37
- Stats at Baseball Reference

Teams
- Texas Rangers (2008–2010); Samsung Lions (2011); Chiba Lotte Marines (2012); Uni-President 7-Eleven Lions (2015); As coach: Texas Rangers (2020–2022)

Career highlights and awards
- Korean Series champion (2011)

Douglas Alan Mathis (born June 7, 1983) is a former professional baseball pitcher and current pitching coach for the Toros de Tijuana of the Mexican League. He played in Major League Baseball, the KBO League, Nippon Professional Baseball (NPB), and the Chinese Professional Baseball League (CPBL). Previously he was a coach in the Seattle Mariners, Toronto Blue Jays and Texas Rangers organizations.

== Amateur career ==
Mathis attended Show Low High School in Show Low, Arizona. He was drafted by the Los Angeles Dodgers after his senior year. He did not sign with the Dodgers, but instead attended Central Arizona College in Coolidge, Arizona. After his first year at Central Arizona, Mathis was drafted in the 31st round by the Seattle Mariners. He declined once again and decided to attend the University of Missouri to play college baseball for the Missouri Tigers. After one year, he was drafted by the Rangers and signed a minor league contract.

== Playing career ==
=== Texas Rangers ===
In 2006, Mathis played for the Advanced A Bakersfield Blaze and was California League Pitcher of the Week twice. In 2007, he was Texas League Pitcher of the Week twice and was a mid-season all-star for the AA Frisco RoughRiders. Mathis began the 2008 season with the AAA Oklahoma City RedHawks and was called to the majors in May. Mathis made his major league debut with the Rangers on May 12, 2008, when he entered the game against the Seattle Mariners in the 10th inning and was the winning pitcher in the Rangers' 13–12 victory. During the early part of the 2010 season, Mathis was sent down to the minor leagues, where he continued to struggle getting batters out.

=== Cleveland Indians/San Francisco Giants/Oakland Athletics ===
On January 5, 2011, he signed a minor league contract with the Cleveland Indians. He was later released by Cleveland and signed a minor league contract with the San Francisco Giants before being released by them. Mathis then signed a minor league contract with the Oakland Athletics on June 18.

=== Samsung Lions ===
On July 16, 2011, Mathis joined the Samsung Lions in the Korea Baseball Organization. He went 5–2 with a 2.52 earned run average during the 2011 regular season.

=== Boston Red Sox ===
Mathis signed a minor league contract with the Boston Red Sox on December 11, 2011.

On July 25, 2012, the Boston Red Sox released Mathis.

=== Chiba Lotte Marines ===
Mathis signed with the Chiba Lotte Marines in Japan on July 27, 2012.

=== Texas Rangers ===
Mathis signed a minor league contract with the Texas Rangers on December 13, 2013. He was later released on April 11.

=== Tampa Bay Rays ===
On April 16, 2014, Mathis signed a minor league contract with the Tampa Bay Rays.

=== Uni-President 7-Eleven Lions ===
On May 7, 2015, Mathis signed with the Uni-President 7-Eleven Lions of the Chinese Professional Baseball League.

== Coaching career ==
=== Seattle Mariners ===
Mathis was the pitching coach of the Clinton LumberKings in the Seattle Mariners organization in 2017 and 2018.

=== Toronto Blue Jays ===
Mathis moved to the Toronto Blue Jays organization in 2019, as the pitching coach of the Buffalo Bisons.

=== Texas Rangers ===
Mathis was named the bullpen coach of the Texas Rangers on January 2, 2020. Mathis was named a Rangers co-pitching coach, along with Brendan Sagara, following the 2019 season. The Rangers dismissed Mathis and Sagara after the 2022 season.

=== Los Angeles Dodgers ===
On February 23, 2024, Mathis was hired by the Los Angeles Dodgers to serve as a pitching coach for their Triple–A affiliate, the Oklahoma City Comets.

=== Toros de Tijuana ===
On January 8, 2026, Mathis was hired to serve as the pitching coach for the Toros de Tijuana of the Mexican League.
