= Payson Airport =

Airport in Gila County, Arizona

- IATA: PJB; ICAO: KPAN; FAA LID: PAN

Summary
- Airport type: Public
- Owner: Town of Payson
- Location: Payson, Arizona
- Elevation AMSL: 5,157 ft / 1,572 m
- Coordinates: 34°15′25″N 111°20′21″W
- Website: www.paysonairport.com

Map

Runways
Direction	Length		Surface
Direction	ft	m	Surface
6/24	5,504	1,678	Asphalt

Helipads
Number	Length		Surface
Number	ft	m	Surface
H1	50	15	Concrete

Statistics (2022)
- Aircraft operations (year ending 5/10/2022): 34,250
- Based aircraft: 40
- Source: Federal Aviation Administration

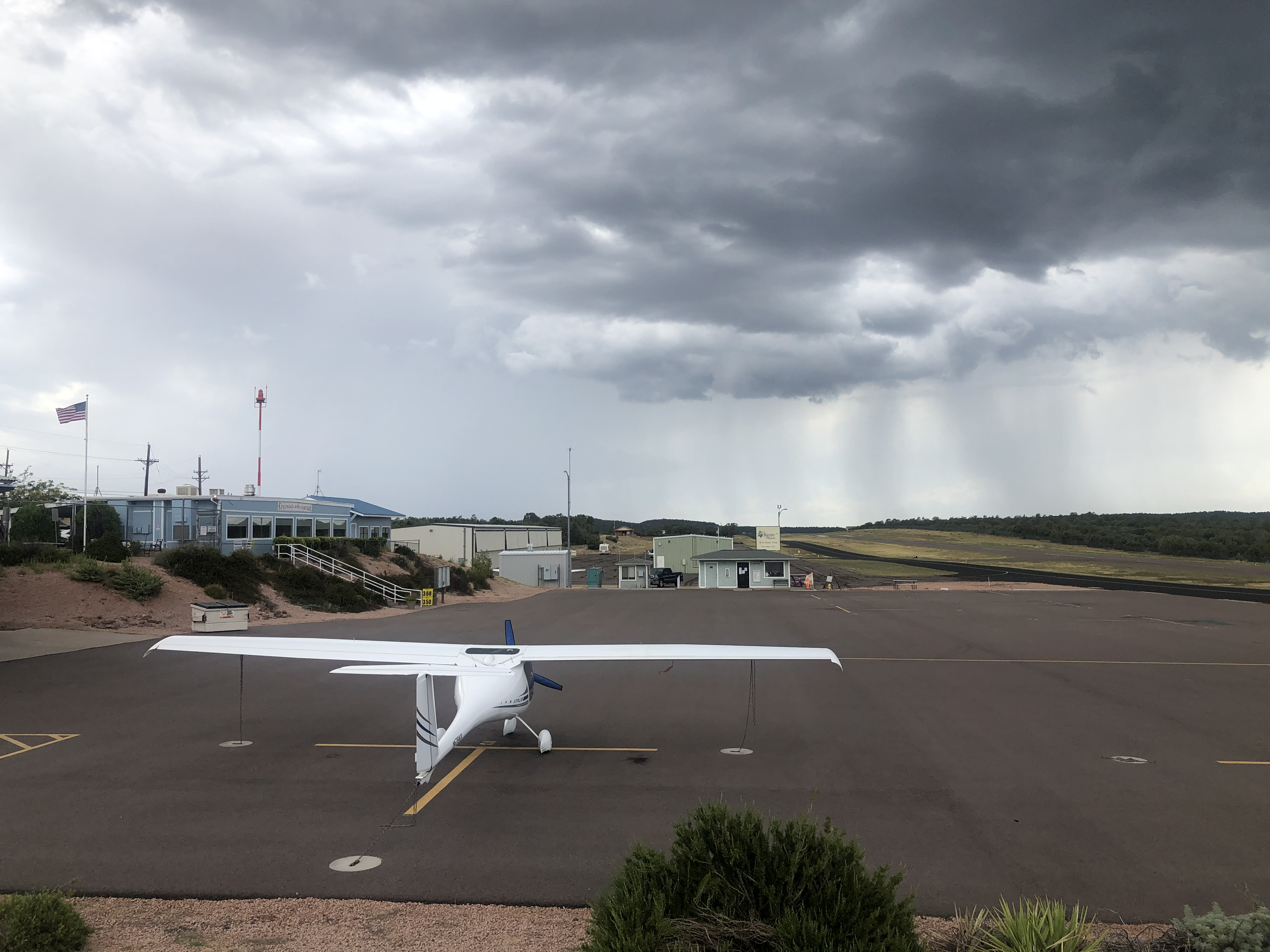
Payson Airport

Payson Airport (IATA: PJB, ICAO: KPAN, FAA LID: PAN) is a public airport in Payson, a town in Gila County, Arizona, United States. The airport is 1 mile (0.87 nmi; 1.6 km) west of the central business district ofcovers 80 acres (32 ha) and has one runway and one helipad. It is mostly used for general aviation, and is host to a number of fire-fighting aircraft during the summer fire season.

== Facilities and aircraft ==
=== Facilities ===
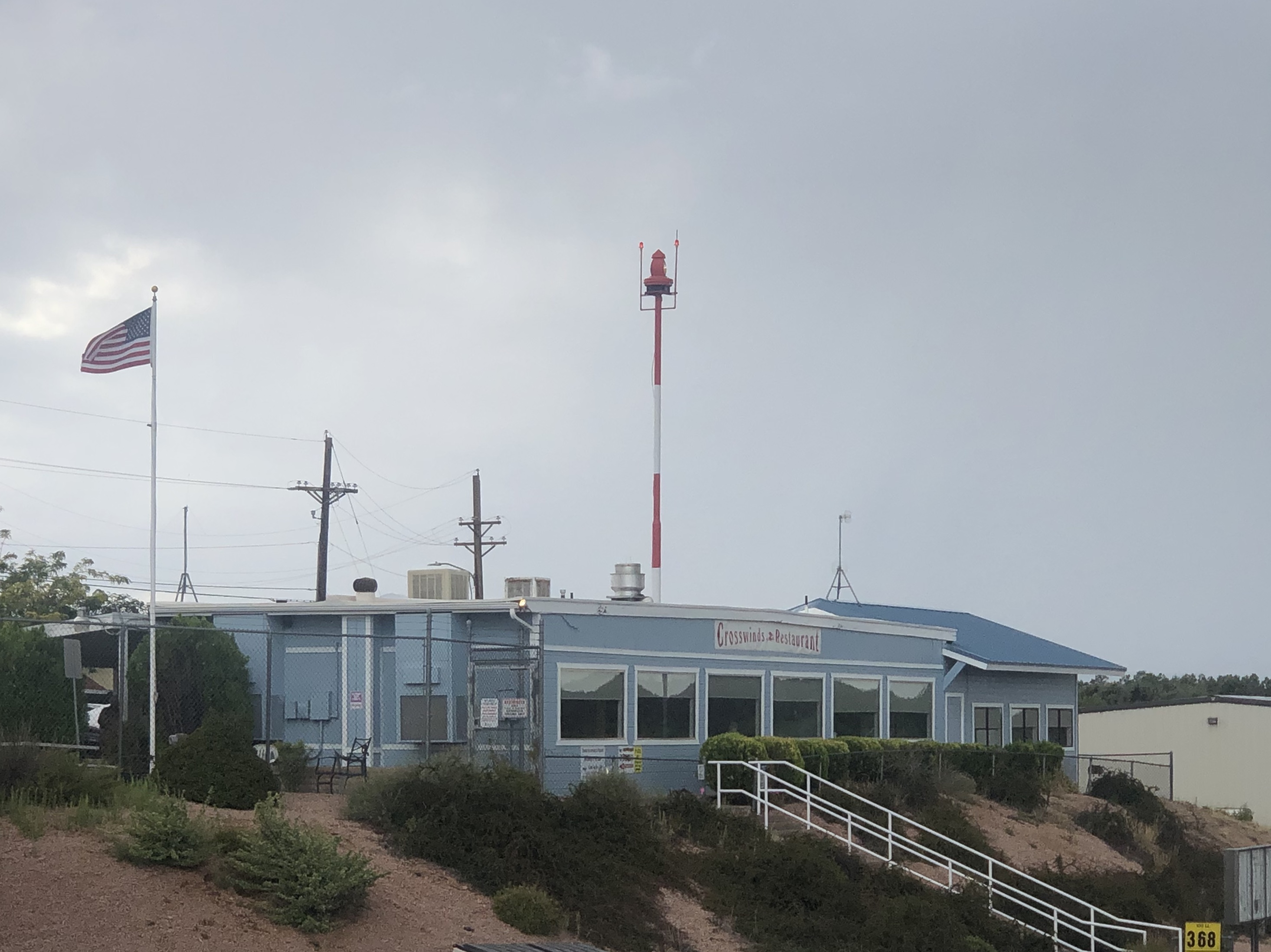
Crosswinds Restaurant

Payson Airport covers an area of 80 acres (32 ha) which contains one asphalt paved runway, and one concrete helipad:

- Runway 6/24 measuring 5,504 x 75 ft (1,678 x 23 m)
- Helipad 1 (H1) measuring 50 x 50 ft (15 x 15 m)

The airport does not have an air traffic control tower.

For the period ending May 10, 2022, the airport had 34,250 operations at an average of 94 a day, 93% general aviation, 5% air taxi and 1% military.

Payson Aviation is the main provider of fixed-base operations. Payson Air also provides some services such as aircraft maintenance. They are the airport's only flight training school.

=== Aircraft ===
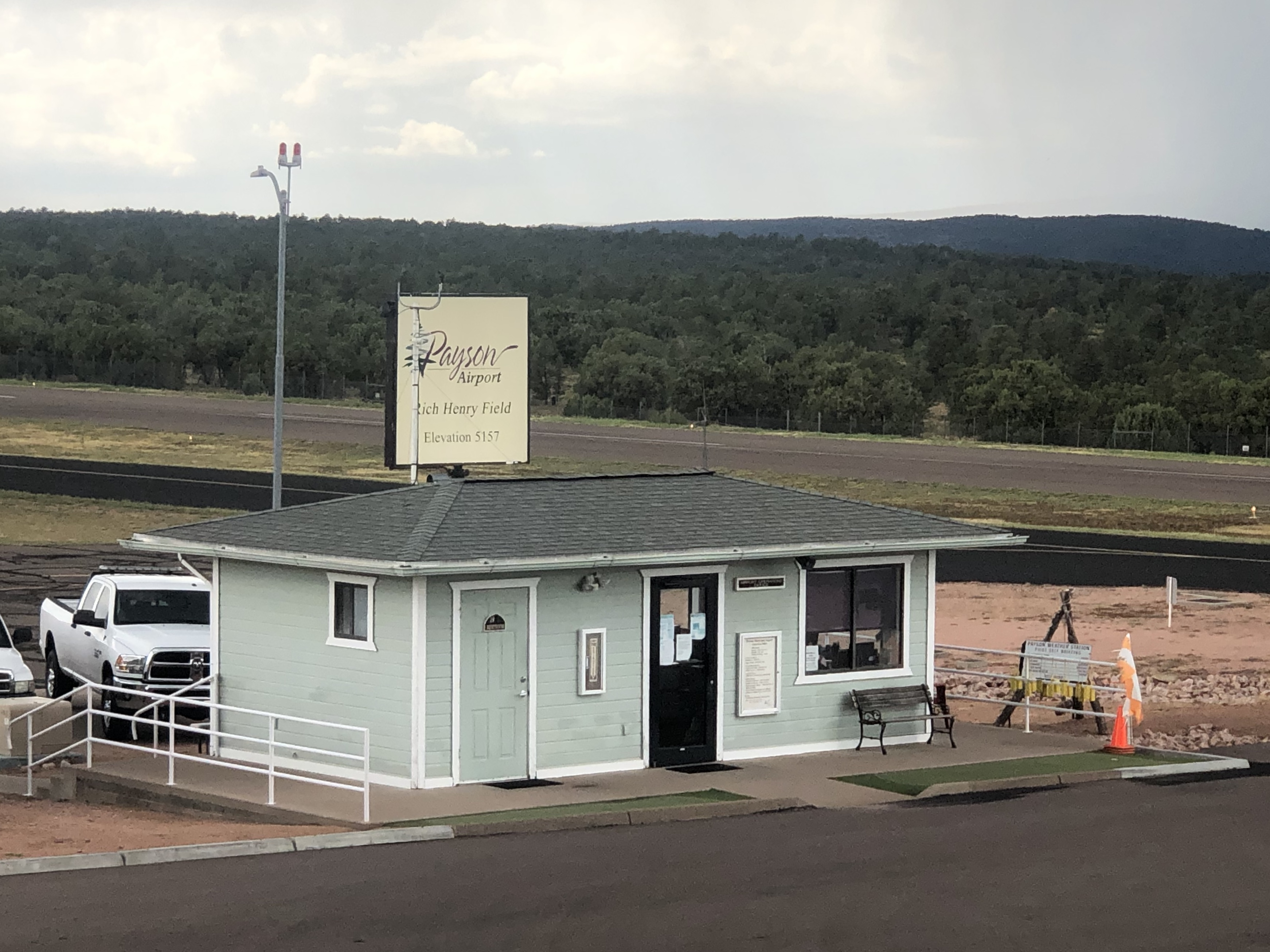
Payson Airport - Rich Henry Field

In May 2022, there were 40 aircraft based on the field. These include 37 single-engine, 1 multi-engine, 1 ultra-light, and 1 glider.

== Airline and destinations ==
=== Cargo ===
Airlines	Destinations
Ameriflight	Phoenix-Sky Harbor, Show Low

== See also ==
- List of airports in Arizona
