= Blue Ridge High School (Arizona) =

Coordinates: 34.1484°N 109.9683°W

Location
- 1200 W. White Mountain Blvd. Lakeside, Arizona 85929; United States

Information
- School type: Public high school
- School district: Blue Ridge Unified School District
- CEEB code: 030185
- Principal: Ryan Grace
- Teaching staff: 35.10 (FTE)
- Grades: 9-12
- Enrollment: 636 (2023–2024)
- Student to teacher ratio: 18.12
- Campus type: Rural
- Colors: Purple and gold
- Athletics conference: 3A - East, Division III
- Mascot: Yellow Jacket
- Rival: Show Low High School
- Website: high.brusd.org

Blue Ridge High School is a public high school in Pinetop-Lakeside, Arizona. It is the only traditional high school under the jurisdiction of the Blue Ridge Unified School District. The school enrolls an estimated 672 students in grades 9–12. Blue Ridge's mascot is a yellow jacket and its school colors are purple and gold. The school is a member of the Arizona Interscholastic Association's 3A East Athletics Conference and competes in Division III sports.

== Demographics ==
As of 2020, there were 41 total teachers, principals, and other school leaders and 651 students currently enrolled in the district with enrollment listed at 100%. Of the 41 teachers, principals, and other school leaders, 6 (14.63%) are listed as inexperienced, and 1 (2.44%) is listed as teaching out of the field.

The racial makeup of the students, in 2020, was 47.16% White, 26.42% Hispanic, 20.74% Native American and 4.15% Multiple Races. The four-year graduation rate within the first 4 years of enrolling in high school was 83.89%. Graduation rates were broken down to: 90% Female, 79% Male, 86.96% Hispanic, 82.86% Native American, 84.88% White, 86.11% Low SES, and 64.29% Special Education. In 2020, reports indicate 34 students were enrolled in at least one Advanced Placement course, 0 students with chronic absenteeism, 11 indents of violence and 0 students reported as harassed or bullied based on sex, race, color, national origin or disability.

== Academics ==
In the fiscal year 2019, the Arizona Department of Education published an annual achievement profile for Blue Ridge High School resulting in a grade of "B" based on an A through F scale. Scores were based on "year to year student academic growth, proficiency on English language arts, math and science, the proficiency and academic growth of English language learners, indicators that an elementary student is ready for success in high school and that high school students are ready to succeed in a career or higher education and high school graduation rates".

The United States national nonprofit organization, GreatSchools, gives Blue Ridge High School a 5/10 (about average) overall rating noting that students perform "about average on state tests, have below average college readiness measures, and this school has below average results in how well it’s serving disadvantaged students". The organization gives Show Low High School a 5/10 for "Academic progress", 4/10 for "college readiness", 4/10 for standardized "test scores", and 3/10 for "equity" (disadvantaged students at this school may be falling behind).

== Extracurricular activities ==
=== Athletics ===
Blue Ridge High School competes in interscholastic athletics in several sports. The school is 1 of 6 high schools in the Arizona 3A East Athletics Conference and competes in Division III sports.

State championships for the Yellow Jackets in athletics include the following:

- Baseball (Boys): 2011
- Basketball (Girls): 1982
- Football (Boys): 1974, 1983, 1987, 1989, 1990, 1994, 1995, 1996, 1997, 2000, 2001, 2004, 2009, 2011 and 2013
- Golf (Boys): 1997
- Soccer (Boys): 1999, 2001, 2003, 2005, 2007, 2009, 2010, 2011, 2012, 2019 and 2020
- Soccer (Girls): 2003, 2004, 2007, 2008, 2009, 2012, 2013, 2014 and 2015
- Softball (Girls): 2009
- Track & Field (Boys): 1964, 2007 and 2009
- Track & Field (Girls): 2006, 2008 and 2009
- Wrestling: 1974
- Chess (Mixed): Dates Unknown

== Awards and recognition ==
- U.S. News & World Report (2018)-BRHS awarded National Bronze Medal
- Ranked number 65 in Arizona-the only small rural Arizona/only White Mountains school awarded a national medal
- The Blue Ridge High School ranking data featured 68 percent of students enrolled in AP classes passing their AP exams
- Blue Ridge’s graduation rate of 82 percent is above expectations for a student body that is 51 percent economically disadvantaged

== Notable alumni ==
- Ann Kirkpatrick, United States Congresswoman from Arizona's 2nd congressional district
