= Show Low Unified School District =

School district in Navajo County, Arizona

Location
- Show Low, surrounding areas Arizona United States

District information
- Type: Public
- Motto: Pride, Knowledge, Success
- Grades: Pre K–12
- Superintendent: Dr. Joseph Farnsworth
- Schools: 5
- Budget: $19,507,000

Students and staff
- Students: 2,516
- Teachers: 128.00
- Staff: 147.00

Other information
- Website: District Website

The Show Low Unified School District (SLUSD) is the school district for Show Low, Arizona. The superintendent is Shad Housley.

== History ==
In 2013 the district leadership asked voters to approve an "override" of 10% of its budget, $1.2 million. The measure failed, with 1,746 of 2,810 (63%) voters rejecting it. 1,064 (38%) voters had approved of the measure.

== Demographics ==
As of 2019, there were 139 total teachers, principals, and other school leaders and 2,509 students currently enrolled in the district with enrollment listed at 100%. Of the 139 teachers, principals, and other school leaders, 24 (17.3%) are listed as inexperienced in the field and 137 of 139 are title 1 certified.

The racial makeup of the students, in 2019, was 74.9% White, 17.5% Hispanic, 3.8% Native American, 2.3% Multiple Races, 0.8% Asian, and 0.6% African American. The four-year graduation rate within the first 4 years of enrolling in high school was 83.8%. Graduation rates were broken down to: 81.2% Male, 86.6% Female, 82.4% Hispanic, 82.3% Low SES, 75.7% Special Education, and 86.6% White. In 2019, reports indicate 0 students were enrolled in at least one advanced placement course, 0 students with chronic absenteeism, 13 indents of violence and 17 students reported as harassed or bullied based on sex, race, color, national origin or disability.

== Academics ==
In the fiscal year 2019, the Arizona Department of Education published an annual achievement profile for every public school in the state based on an A through F scale. Linden Elementary received an "A" while Nikolaus Homestead and Show Low High School jointly received a "B", and Show Low Junior High received a "C". Whipple Ranch and White Mountain Institute were not rated by the organization. Scores were based on "year to year student academic growth, proficiency on English language arts, math and science, the proficiency and academic growth of English language learners, indicators that an elementary student is ready for success in high school and that high school students are ready to succeed in a career or higher education and high school graduation rates".

The United States national nonprofit organization, GreatSchools, gives the following school ratings: Linden Elementary 6/10 (about average), Nikolaus Homestead 5/10 (about average), Show Low Junior High 5/10 (about average), Show Low High School 5/10 (about average), and White Mountain Institute 2/10 (below average). Whipple Ranch was not rated by the organization. The organization gives Show Low High School a 5/10 for "Academic progress", 4/10 for "College readiness", 6/10 for standardized "test scores", and 3/10 "equity" (disadvantaged students at this school may be falling behind).

== Schools ==
Secondary schools

- Show Low High School
- Show Low Junior High School

Elementary schools

- Linden
- Nikolaus Homestead
- Whipple Ranch

The district also includes White Mountain Institute, an online school.
