= Blue Ridge Unified School District =

School district in Navajo County, Arizona

Location
- 1200 W. White Mountain Blvd Lakeside, AZ 85929 Arizona United States

District information
- Type: Public
- Grades: Pre-K–12
- Established: 1963
- Superintendent: Dr. Michael L. Wright
- Schools: 3
- Budget: $1

Students and staff
- Students: 2,034
- Teachers: 101.32
- Staff: 112.79

Other information
- Website: District Website

The Blue Ridge Unified School District (BRUSD) is the school district for Pinetop-Lakeside, Arizona. It operates three distinct schools on two campuses; a high school (Blue Ridge High School), junior high, and elementary school. All schools in the district use the Yellowjackets mascot and yellow and purple colors.

The elementary school is in a building built in 2008. The structure includes a multipurpose room/auxiliary gym, gymnasium, and combined media center. The high school, junior high, and district offices are all held on a separate campus nearby.

== History ==
In 2013 the district leadership asked voters to approve an "override" of 15% of its budget, $500,000. The measure failed, with 1,391 of 2,285 (61%) voters rejecting it. 894 (39%) voters had approved of the measure.

== Demographics ==
As of 2020, there were 105 total teachers, principals, and other school leaders and 1,898 students currently enrolled in the district with enrollment listed at 100%. Of the 105 teachers, principals, and other school leaders, 16 (15%) are listed as inexperienced in the field and 101 of 105 are title 1 certified.

The racial makeup of the students, in 2020, was 50% White, 25% Hispanic, 18% Native American, 5% Multiple Races, and 1% Asian. The four-year graduation rate within the first 4 years of enrolling in high school was 84%. Graduation rates were broken down to: 90% Female, 79% Male, 87% Hispanic, 83% Native American, 87% White, 86% Low SES, and 64% Special Education. In 2020, reports indicate 34 students were enrolled in at least one advanced placement course, 0 students with chronic absenteeism, 16 indents of violence and 0 students reported as harassed or bullied based on sex, race, color, national origin or disability.

== Academics ==
In the fiscal year 2019, the Arizona Department of Education published an annual achievement profile for every public school in the state based on an A through F scale. Blue Ridge Elementary received a "C" while Blue Ridge Jr High School and Blue Ridge High School both received a "B". Blue Ridge High School online was not rated by the organization. Scores were based on "year to year student academic growth, proficiency on English language arts, math and science, the proficiency and academic growth of English language learners, indicators that an elementary student is ready for success in high school and that high school students are ready to succeed in a career or higher education and high school graduation rates".

The United States national nonprofit organization, GreatSchools, gives the following school ratings: Blue Ridge Elementary 3/10 (below average), Blue Ridge Junior High 4/10 (below average) and Blue Ridge High School 4/10 (below average). Blue Ridge High School online was not rated by the organization. The organization gives Blue Ridge High School a 5/10 for "Academic progress", 4/10 for "College readiness", 4/10 for standardized "test scores", and 3/10 "equity" (disadvantaged students at this school may be falling behind).

== Elementary School (Grades K–6) ==
The elementary school is located at 3050 Porter Mountain Road, Lakeside, Arizona. The principal is Mrs. Gail Irestone (as of February 16, 2021). In January 2021, Mrs. Irestone announced her retirement. A new principal has not been selected yet.

== Junior High School (Grades 7–8) ==
The junior high school is located at 1200 White Mountain Boulevard, Lakeside, Arizona. The principal is Mrs. Courtney Hoffmeyer (as of February 16, 2021). Listed below are the Junior High teachers and staff, including the subjects they teach, if applicable. (In progress)

== High School (Grades 9–12) ==
Blue Ridge High School is a 3A high school under the jurisdiction of the Blue Ridge Unified School District.

The high school is located at the same campus at the junior high 1200 White Mountain Boulevard, Lakeside, Arizona. Mr. Loren Webb is the principal, along with vice principal Bryon Crain.

The high school offers numerous Advanced Placement courses.

=== Notable alumni ===
- Ann Kirkpatrick, United States Congresswoman from Arizona's 2nd congressional district. Kirkpatrick graduated as valedictorian.
