= Show Low Regional Airport =

Airport in Navajo County, Arizona

- IATA: SOW; ICAO: KSOW; FAA LID: SOW

Summary
- Airport type: Public
- Owner: City of Show Low
- Serves: Show Low, Arizona
- Elevation AMSL: 6,415 ft (1,955 m)
- Coordinates: 34°15′56″N 110°00′20″W
- Website: SOW website

Map
- Location within Arizona Location within the United States

Runways
Direction	Length		Surface
Direction	ft	m	Surface
6/24	7,200	2,195	Asphalt
3/21	3,938	1,200	Asphalt

Statistics (2022)
- Aircraft operations: 19,674
- Based aircraft: 32
- Source: Federal Aviation Administration

Show Low Regional Airport (IATA: SOW, ICAO: KSOW, FAA LID: SOW) is 2 miles (1.7 nmi; 3.2 km) east of Show Low, in Navajo County, Arizona, United States. It is used for general aviation and commercial services provided by Southern Airways Express which is subsidized by the federal government's Essential Air Service program at a cost of $1,672,000(per year). The National Plan of Integrated Airport Systems for 2011–2015 categorized it as a non-primary commercial service airport (between 2,500 and 10,000 enplanements per year).

== Historical airline service ==
Show Low first began receiving commercial air service in 1994 by Scenic Airlines and Arizona Pacific Airlines, both providing commuter aircraft flights to Phoenix. Arizona Pacific ended service the following year and Scenic ended in 1996. Great Lakes Airlines then provided service to Phoenix from 1996 through 1997. Service returned in 1999 by Sunrise Airlines, an offshoot of Scenic Airlines, but ended in 2000. The city was then able to secure subsidized air service under the Essential Air Service program and Great Lakes Airlines returned in 2005 with flights to both Phoenix and Denver, the latter making a stop at Farmington, NM. Great Lakes was replaced in 2015 by Boutique Air, which only had flights to Phoenix. Flights are currently operated by Southern Airways Express which took over service from Boutique Air on July 16, 2022.

== Facilities ==
The airport covers 691 acres (280 ha) at an elevation of 6,415 feet (1,955 m). It has two asphalt runways: 6/24 is 7,200 by 100 feet (2,195 x 30 m); 3/21 is 3,938 by 60 feet (1,200 x 18 m). The airport is an uncontrolled airport that has no control tower.

In the year ending April 30, 2012 the airport had 12,833 aircraft operations, average 35 per day: 69% general aviation, 19% air taxi, 11% airline and 1% military. 41 aircraft were then based at this airport: 85% single-engine and 15% multi-engine.

== Airlines and destinations ==
=== Passenger ===
Airlines	Destinations
Contour Airlines	Phoenix–Sky Harbor

=== Top Destinations ===
(August 2024 - July 2025)
Rank	Airport	Passengers	Airline
1	Phoenix, Arizona	7,650	Contour Airlines

=== Cargo ===
Airlines	Destinations	Refs
Ameriflight	Holbrook, Payson, Phoenix-Sky Harbor	

== Statistics ==
Passenger boardings (enplanements) by year, as per the FAA
Year	2008	2009	2010	2011	2012	2013	2014	2015	2016	2017	2018
Enplanements	5,325	4,470	3,080	3,996	3,852	3,759	1,899	2,253	4,139	4,917	4,042
Change	▼39.8%	▼16.1%	▼31.1%	▲29.7%	▼3.6%	▼2.4%	▼49.5%	▲18.6%	▲83.7%	▲18.8%	▼17.8%
Airline	Great Lakes Airlines	Great Lakes Airlines	Great Lakes Airlines	Great Lakes Airlines	Great Lakes Airlines	Great Lakes Airlines	Great Lakes Airlines	Great Lakes Airlines	Boutique Air	Boutique Air	Boutique Air
Destination(s)	Phoenix	Phoenix	Phoenix	Denver Farmington Phoenix	Denver Farmington Phoenix	Denver Phoenix	Farmington Phoenix	Phoenix	Phoenix	Phoenix	Phoenix

== See also ==
- List of airports in Arizona

== Other sources ==
- Essential Air Service documents (Docket DOT-OST-1998-4409) from the U.S. Department of Transportation:
  - Order 2005-3-16 (March 9, 2005): selecting Great Lakes Aviation, Ltd. to provide Essential Air Service at Kingman, Prescott, Page, and Show Low for a new two-year period, at a combined first-year subsidy of $3,840,959, and a combined second-year subsidy of $3,854,958.
  - Order 2007-6-10 (June 13, 2007): selecting Great Lakes Aviation, Ltd. to provide subsidized Essential Air Service at Page and Show Low, Arizona, for two years, with the new contract term beginning when Air Midwest inaugurates service at Kingman and Prescott. The annual subsidy rates for Page and Show Low will be $1,497,556 and $988,181, respectively. Page will receive 19 weekly nonstop round trips to Phoenix with the option to provide one more frequency during peak times and one fewer during non peaks. One round trip a day may be substituted to either Las Vegas (nonstop) or Denver (one-stop) with no change in subsidy. Show Low will receive 14 nonstop round trips per week to Phoenix with 19-passenger Beechcraft 1900D aircraft.
  - Order 2009-8-5 (August 10, 2009): re-selecting Great Lakes Aviation, Ltd. to provide Essential Air Service at Page and Show Low, Arizona, at annual subsidy rates of $1,995,273 and $1,407,255, respectively, and for a 19-month period from October 1, 2009, through April 30, 2011.
  - Order 2011-3-4 (March 1, 2011): re-selecting Great Lakes Aviation, Ltd. to provide Essential Air Service at Kingman, Page, Prescott, and Show Low, Arizona for the two-year period from May 1, 2011, to April 30, 2013, for a combined annual subsidy of $5,596,114.
  - Order 2013-6-1 (June 3, 2013): re-selecting Great Lakes Aviation, Ltd. to provide Essential Air Service at Kingman, Page, Prescott, and Show Low, Arizona, for the two-year period from May 1, 2013, through April 30, 2015, for a combined annual subsidy of $7,873,533. Subsidy rate for Show Low: $1,672,000. Service consisting of 18 weekly nonstop round trips during peak season (May 1-October 31), and 12 weekly nonstop round trips during off-peak season (November 1 – April 30) to either Los Angeles International Airport or Phoenix Sky Harbor International Airport using 19-passenger Beechcraft 1900D aircraft.
  - Order 2014-3-4 (March 7, 2014): approving the request of Great Lakes Aviation, Ltd. to change part of its service pattern at Show Low, Arizona, to include the option of nonstop service to Denver International Airport via Farmington, New Mexico, effective March 9, 2014.
