= Show Low High School =

Coordinates: 34.2610°N 110.0491°W

Location
- 500 W. Old Linden Rd. Show Low, Arizona 85901; United States

Information
- School type: Public high school
- Established: 1975 (51 years ago)
- School district: Show Low Unified School District
- CEEB code: 030418
- Principal: Ben Marchant
- Grades: 9-12
- Enrollment: 836 (2023–2024)
- Campus type: Rural
- Colors: Forest green and gold
- Athletics conference: 3A – East, Division III
- Mascot: Cougars
- Rival: Blue Ridge High School
- Website: hs.showlow.education

Show Low High School is a public high school in Show Low, Arizona. It is the only traditional high school under the jurisdiction of the Show Low Unified School District. The school enrolls an estimated 767 students in grades 9–12. Show Low's mascot is a cougar and its school colors are green and gold. The school is a member of the Arizona Interscholastic Association's 3A East Athletics Conference and competes in Division III sports.

== History ==
Show Low High was established in 1975. Prior to then, students attended Snowflake High School. As both areas grew Snowflake became overcrowded, and Show Low received its own high school. In the early 2000s, a new high school was built on Cougar Lane in favor of expansion and modernization. The previous school building became Show Low Junior High and has around 700 students.

== Demographics ==
As of 2019–20, there were 42 total teachers, principals, and other school leaders and 782 students currently enrolled in the district with enrollment listed at 100%. Of the 42 teachers, principals, and other school leaders, 5 (8%) are listed as teaching out of the subject area in which they are certified.

The racial makeup of the students, in 2019–20, was 80% White, 14% Hispanic, 3% Native American and 2% Multiple Races. The four-year graduation rate within the first 4 years of enrolling in high school was 88%. Graduation rates were broken down to: 87% Male, 90% Female, 85% Hispanic, 90% White, 84% Low SES, and 76% Special Education. In 2019–20, reports indicate 0 students were enrolled in at least one advanced placement course, 0 students with chronic absenteeism, 0 indents of violence and 12 students reported as harassed or bullied based on sex, race, color, national origin or disability.

== Academics ==
In the fiscal year 2019, the Arizona Department of Education published an annual achievement profile for Show Low High School resulting in a grade of "C" based on an A through F scale. Scores were based on "year to year student academic growth, proficiency on English language arts, math and science, the proficiency and academic growth of English language learners, indicators that an elementary student is ready for success in high school and that high school students are ready to succeed in a career or higher education and high school graduation rates".

The United States national nonprofit organization, GreatSchools, gives Show Low High School a 5/10 (about average) overall rating noting that students perform "about average on state tests, have below average college readiness measures, and this school has below average results in how well it’s serving disadvantaged students". The organization gives Show Low High School a 5/10 for "Academic progress", 4/10 for "college readiness", 6/10 for standardized "test scores", and 3/10 for "equity" (disadvantaged students at this school may be falling behind).

== Extracurricular activities ==
There is a variety of interaction clubs and sports include but are not limited to: football, soccer, softball, track, cross country, wrestling, basketball, volleyball, golf, baseball and others.

State championships for the Cougars in athletics include the following:

- Baseball (boys): 1989 and 1991
- Cross country (girls): 1980 and 1981
- Football (boys): 1999, 2003, 2007 and 2010
- Golf (boys): 1990 and 1991
- Soccer (girls): 2011
- Softball (girls): 1985, 1995 and 1998
- Track and field (girls): 1981 and 2015
- Wrestling (boys): 2002, 2003 and 2017

== Notable alumni ==
- Doug Mathis – former Major League Baseball relief pitcher for the Texas Rangers organization
