= Pinetop-Lakeside, Arizona =

Town in Navajo County, Arizona

Pinetop–Lakeside, Arizona
- Town
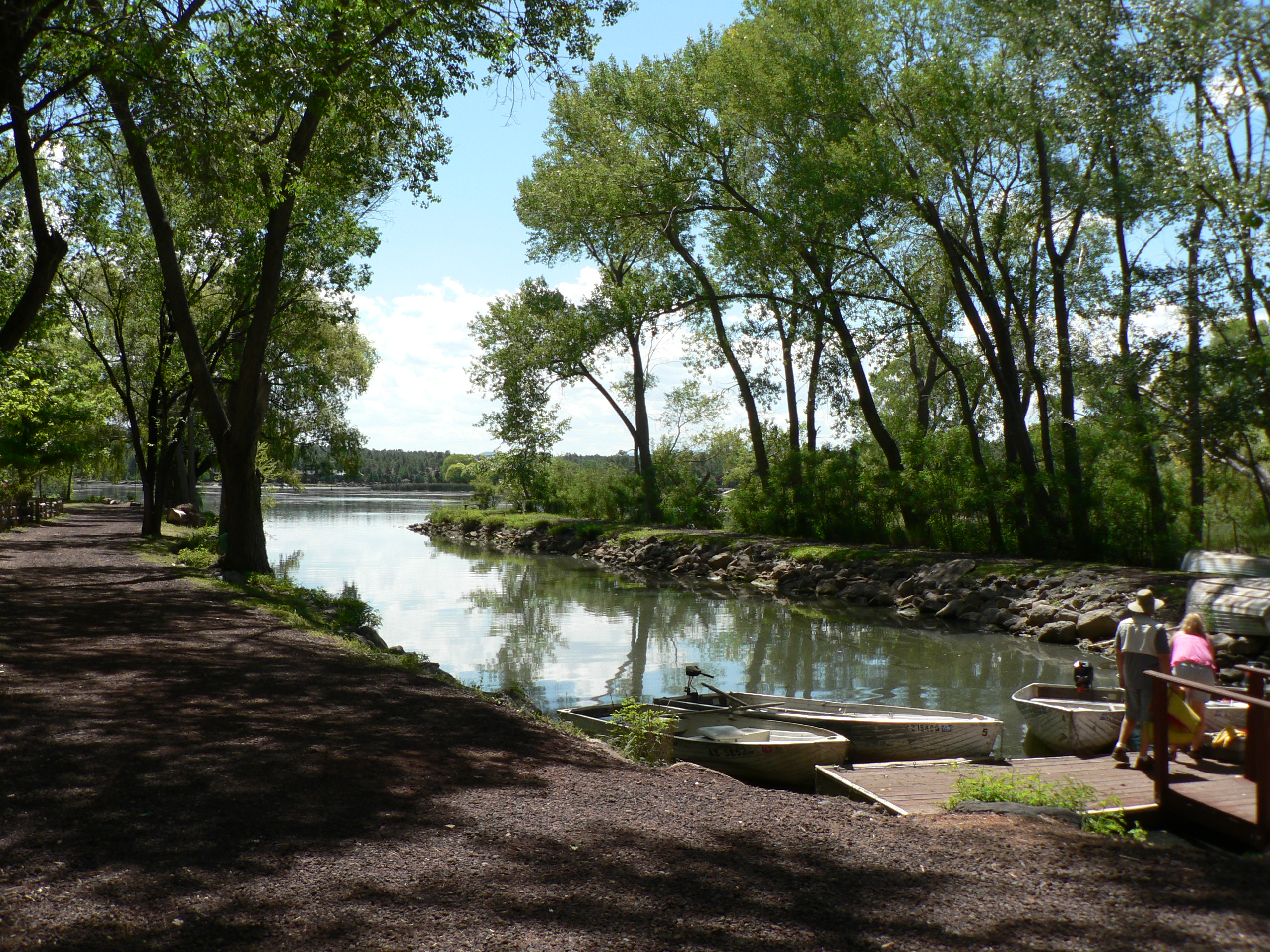
- Lakeside
- Motto: "Celebrate the Seasons"
- Location of Pinetop-Lakeside in Navajo County, Arizona

- Location in the United States
- Coordinates: 34°08′55″N 109°57′57″W
- Country: United States
- State: Arizona
- County: Navajo
- Incorporated: 1984

Government
  - Type: Council–Manager
  - Body: Pinetop-Lakeside City Council
  - Mayor: Stephanie Irwin

Area
  - Total: 11.24 sq mi (29.12 km^{2})
  - Land: 11.15 sq mi (28.88 km^{2})
  - Water: 0.093 sq mi (0.24 km^{2})
- Elevation: 6,805 ft (2,074 m)

Population (2020)
  - Total: 4,030
  - Density: 361.4/sq mi (139.54/km^{2})
- Time zone: UTC−7 (Mountain)
  - Summer (DST): UTC−7 (no DST/PDT)
- ZIP Codes: 85929, 85935
- Area code: 928
- FIPS code: 04-55980
- GNIS ID(s): 2413136
- Website: Town of Pinetop-Lakeside

Pinetop–Lakeside is a town in Navajo County, Arizona, United States. According to 2020 census, the population of the town is 4,030. It was founded in 1984 when the neighboring towns of Pinetop and Lakeside merged.

Pinetop–Lakeside is a popular summer resort and second-home area for Arizona desert residents. In 2002, a large forest fire, the Rodeo–Chediski Fire, threatened the town and forced an evacuation.

== History ==
The town of Lakeside got its name from the area's lakes, and Pinetop got its name from a local saloon owner, Walt Rigney, who got the nickname "Pinetop" from the tall building of his saloon.

Early Mormon settlers moved into the area around Pinetop-Lakeside in the mid-1880s, and were the primary non-native residents for much of the towns early history. The primary industry in that period were sawmills for the large, mature Ponderosa Pine forest that surround it.

While the two towns of Pinetop and Lakeside merged in 1984, many residents and the US postal service consider them distinct communities.

== Geography ==
According to the United States Census Bureau, the town has a total area of 11.3 square miles (29 km^{2}), of which 11.3 square miles (29 km^{2}) is land and 0.1 square miles (0.26 km^{2}) (0.71%) is water.

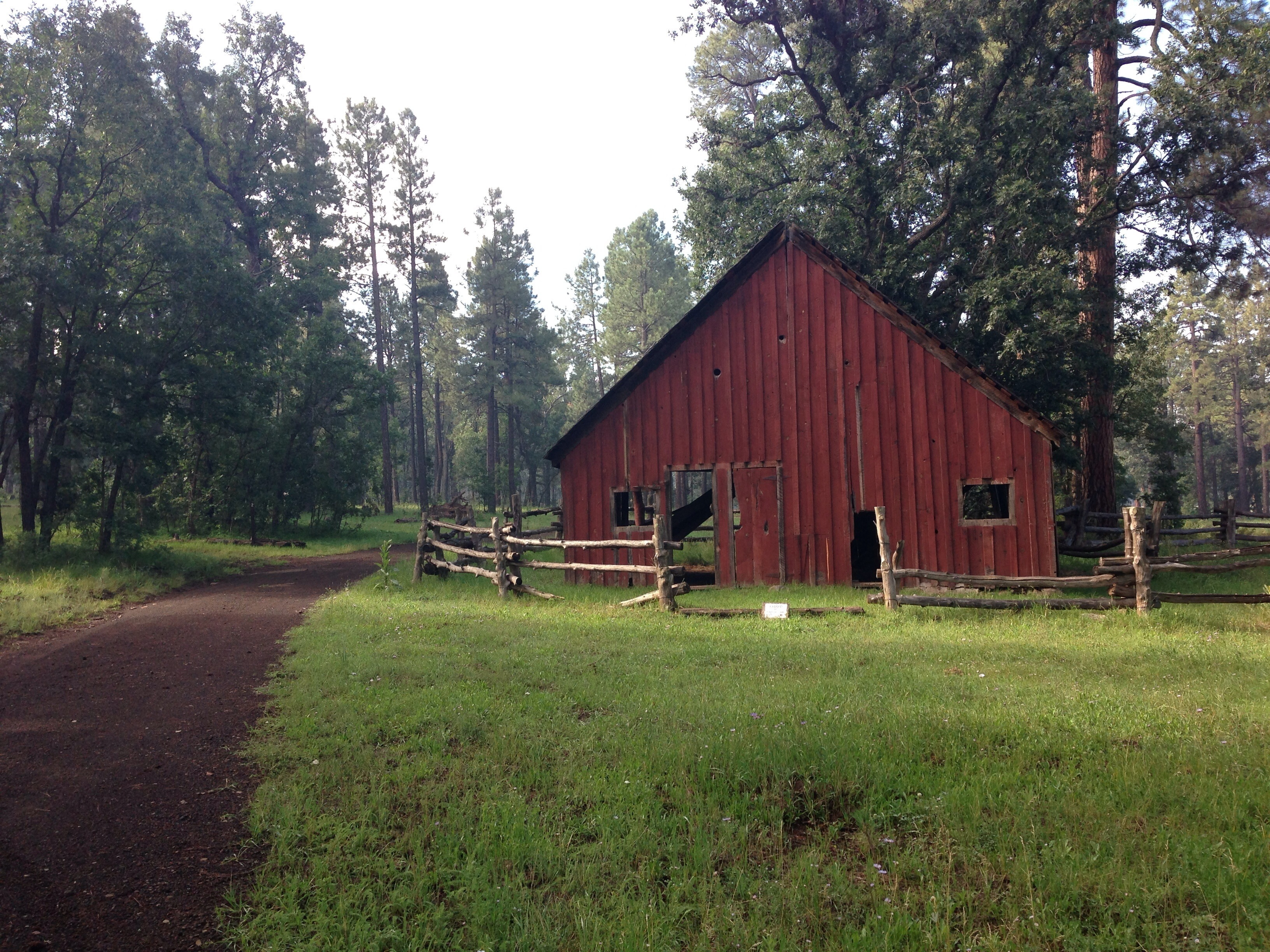
Red Barn near Pinetop, 2013

=== Climate ===
According to the Köppen climate classification system, Pinetop-Lakeside has a Mediterranean dry-summer subtropical climate abbreviated with Csb. The average temperature year round is 49.2 °F (9.6 °C).

Climate data for Pinetop-Lakeside, Arizona (1991–2020 normals, extremes 1947–2020)
Month	Jan	Feb	Mar	Apr	May	Jun	Jul	Aug	Sep	Oct	Nov	Dec	Year
Record high °F (°C)	64 (18)	68 (20)	79 (26)	83 (28)	92 (33)	97 (36)	99 (37)	90 (32)	88 (31)	85 (29)	75 (24)	70 (21)	99 (37)
Mean maximum °F (°C)	59.0 (15.0)	62.2 (16.8)	69.1 (20.6)	75.7 (24.3)	84.0 (28.9)	91.4 (33.0)	92.3 (33.5)	87.7 (30.9)	84.0 (28.9)	77.6 (25.3)	68.6 (20.3)	61.5 (16.4)	93.7 (34.3)
Mean daily maximum °F (°C)	45.3 (7.4)	48.3 (9.1)	54.8 (12.7)	62.1 (16.7)	71.3 (21.8)	82.0 (27.8)	82.2 (27.9)	79.9 (26.6)	75.8 (24.3)	66.4 (19.1)	54.8 (12.7)	45.3 (7.4)	64.0 (17.8)
Daily mean °F (°C)	32.5 (0.3)	35.0 (1.7)	40.6 (4.8)	47.0 (8.3)	54.7 (12.6)	64.2 (17.9)	67.2 (19.6)	65.7 (18.7)	60.7 (15.9)	50.5 (10.3)	40.7 (4.8)	32.0 (0.0)	49.2 (9.6)
Mean daily minimum °F (°C)	19.7 (−6.8)	21.6 (−5.8)	26.5 (−3.1)	31.9 (−0.1)	38.2 (3.4)	46.3 (7.9)	52.3 (11.3)	51.5 (10.8)	45.7 (7.6)	34.5 (1.4)	26.7 (−2.9)	18.7 (−7.4)	34.5 (1.4)
Mean minimum °F (°C)	4.0 (−15.6)	7.3 (−13.7)	13.8 (−10.1)	19.3 (−7.1)	26.6 (−3.0)	37.9 (3.3)	45.8 (7.7)	46.1 (7.8)	34.8 (1.6)	25.1 (−3.8)	12.2 (−11.0)	3.9 (−15.6)	−0.2 (−17.9)
Record low °F (°C)	−8 (−22)	−12 (−24)	−12 (−24)	7 (−14)	22 (−6)	33 (1)	36 (2)	40 (4)	27 (−3)	12 (−11)	2 (−17)	−4 (−20)	−12 (−24)
Average precipitation inches (mm)	2.31 (59)	2.22 (56)	1.97 (50)	0.90 (23)	0.79 (20)	0.58 (15)	3.38 (86)	3.98 (101)	2.03 (52)	1.72 (44)	1.68 (43)	2.52 (64)	24.08 (612)
Average snowfall inches (cm)	16.5 (42)	14.7 (37)	10.4 (26)	4.4 (11)	0.7 (1.8)	0.0 (0.0)	0.0 (0.0)	0.0 (0.0)	0.0 (0.0)	2.8 (7.1)	5.2 (13)	15.6 (40)	70.3 (179)
Average precipitation days (≥ 0.01 inch)	7.2	7.0	6.7	4.4	4.1	3.3	14.6	16.0	9.2	5.5	4.8	7.2	90.0
Average snowy days (≥ 0.1 inch)	5.2	4.9	3.9	2.2	0.4	0.0	0.0	0.0	0.0	0.6	2.1	5.1	24.4
Source 1: NOAA
Source 2: National Weather Service

== Demographics ==
Historical population
Census	Pop.	Note	%±
1980	2,315		—
1990	2,422		4.6%
2000	3,582		47.9%
2010	4,282		19.5%
2020	4,030		−5.9%
U.S. Decennial Census

=== 2020 census ===
As of the 2020 census, Pinetop-Lakeside had a population of 4,030. The median age was 50.3 years. 19.5% of residents were under the age of 18 and 28.8% of residents were 65 years of age or older. For every 100 females there were 104.3 males, and for every 100 females age 18 and over there were 101.2 males age 18 and over.

94.3% of residents lived in urban areas, while 5.7% lived in rural areas.

There were 1,698 households in Pinetop-Lakeside, of which 25.5% had children under the age of 18 living in them. Of all households, 48.5% were married-couple households, 21.1% were households with a male householder and no spouse or partner present, and 23.0% were households with a female householder and no spouse or partner present. About 29.0% of all households were made up of individuals and 15.2% had someone living alone who was 65 years of age or older.

There were 3,409 housing units, of which 50.2% were vacant. The homeowner vacancy rate was 3.4% and the rental vacancy rate was 13.7%.

Racial composition as of the 2020 census
Race	Number	Percent
White	3,042	75.5%
Black or African American	20	0.5%
American Indian and Alaska Native	374	9.3%
Asian	51	1.3%
Native Hawaiian and Other Pacific Islander	9	0.2%
Some other race	152	3.8%
Two or more races	382	9.5%
Hispanic or Latino (of any race)	555	13.8%

=== 2000 census ===
At the 2000 census there were 3,582 people, 1,436 households, and 1,020 families in the town. The population density was 318.1 inhabitants per square mile (122.8/km^{2}). There were 2,750 housing units at an average density of 244.2 per square mile (94.3/km^{2}). The racial makeup of the town was 89.2% White, 1.0% Black or African American, 2.3% Native American, 0.3% Asian, <0.1% Pacific Islander, 4.6% from other races, and 2.5% from two or more races. 11.4% of the population were Hispanic or Latino of any race. Of the 1,436 households 30.4% had children under the age of 18 living with them, 58.7% were married couples living together, 8.1% had a female householder with no husband present, and 28.9% were non-families. 23.9% of households were one person and 8.5% were one person aged 65 or older. The average household size was 2.48 and the average family size was 2.92.

The age distribution was 25.5% under the age of 18, 5.5% from 18 to 24, 24.7% from 25 to 44, 29.5% from 45 to 64, and 14.8% 65 or older. The median age was 41 years. For every 100 females, there were 103.1 males. For every 100 females age 18 and over, there were 98.4 males.

The median household income was $36,706 and the median family income was $42,195. Males had a median income of $36,622 versus $23,594 for females. The per capita income for the town was $18,541. About 6.6% of families and 10.1% of the population were below the poverty line, including 10.6% of those under age 18 and 6.1% of those age 65 or over.

== Education ==
The town is served by the Blue Ridge Unified School District.

Schools that serve the town include Blue Ridge Elementary School, Blue Ridge Middle School, Blue Ridge Junior High School, and Blue Ridge High School.

== Notable person ==
- Zella Day (born 1995) – Singer, songwriter
