= Phoenix Sky Harbor International Airport =

Airport in Arizona, United States

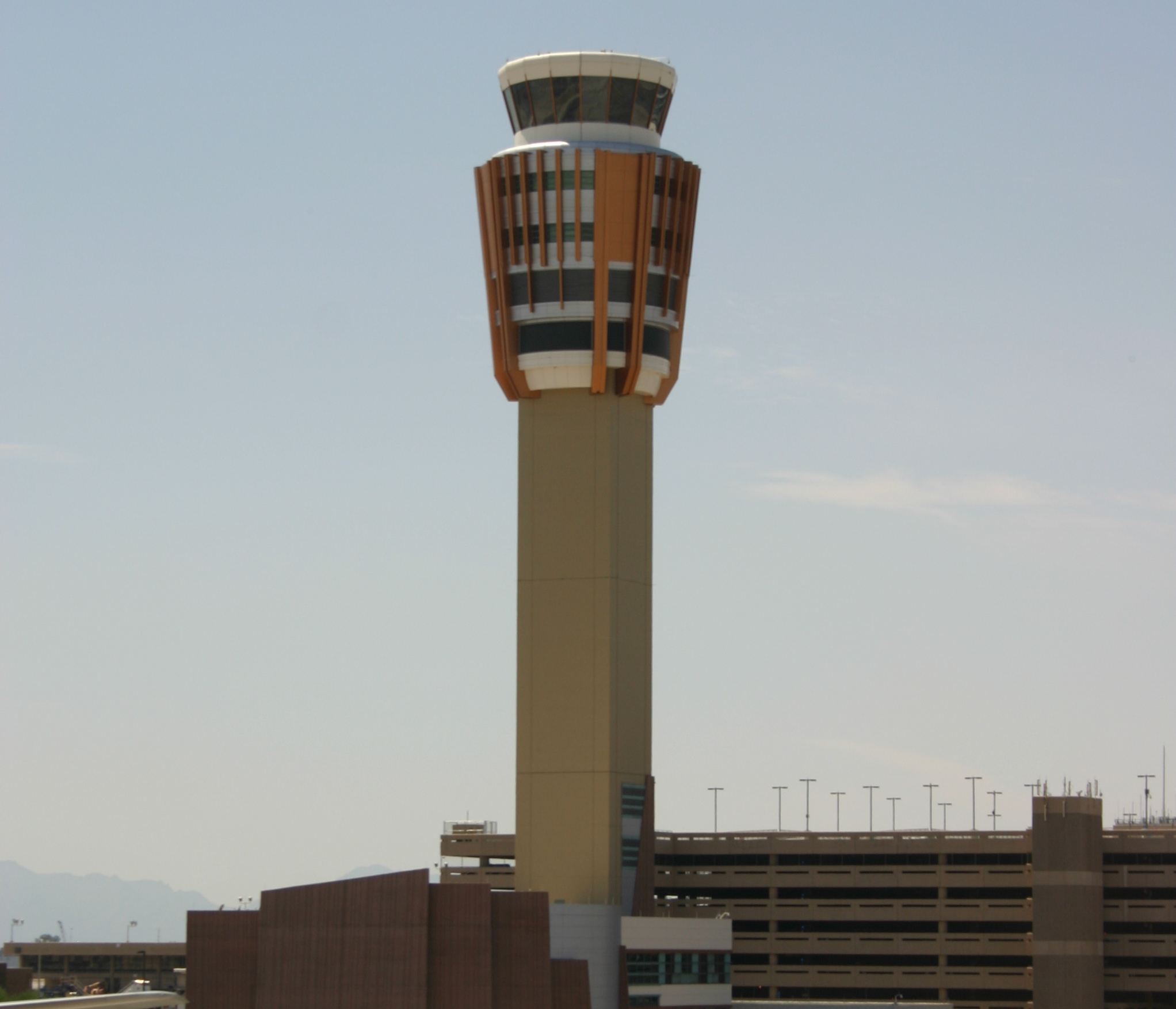
- IATA: PHX; ICAO: KPHX; FAA LID: PHX; WMO: 72278

Summary
- Airport type: Public / Military
- Owner/Operator: City of Phoenix
- Serves: Phoenix metropolitan area
- Location: Phoenix, Arizona, U.S.
- Opened: 1928; 98 years ago
- Hub for: American Airlines
- Operating base for: Frontier Airlines; Southwest Airlines
- Time zone: MST (UTC−07:00)
- Elevation AMSL: 1,135 ft (346 m)
- Coordinates: 33°26′03″N 112°00′42″W
- Public transit access: at 44th Street/Washington
- Website: www.skyharbor.com

Maps
- FAA airport diagram
- Interactive map of Phoenix Sky Harbor; International Airport

Runways
Direction	Length		Surface
Direction	ft	m	Surface
8/26	11,489	3,502	Concrete
7L/25R	10,300	3,139	Concrete
7R/25L	7,800	2,377	Concrete

Statistics (2025)
- Aircraft operations: 487,142
- Passengers: 51,618,649 ▼1.4%
- Cargo & Mail (tons): 358,426
- Source: Federal Aviation Administration

Phoenix Sky Harbor International Airport (IATA: PHX, ICAO: KPHX, FAA LID: PHX) is a civil-military public international airport 3 miles (2.6 nmi; 4.8 km) east of downtown Phoenix, in Maricopa County, Arizona, United States. It is Arizona's largest and busiest airport. Among the largest commercial airports in the United States, PHX was the 11th-busiest airport in the United States in terms of passenger boardings and 38th-busiest in the world in 2025. The airport serves as a hub for American Airlines and a base for Frontier Airlines and Southwest Airlines.

The airport is also home to the 161st Air Refueling Wing (161 ARW), an Air Mobility Command (AMC)–gained unit of the Arizona Air National Guard. The military enclave is known as Goldwater Air National Guard Base. One of two flying units in the Arizona ANG, the 161 ARW flies the KC-135R Stratotanker aircraft. In addition to its domestic role as a National Guard unit, answering to the Governor of Arizona, the 161 ARW also performs both a stateside and overseas role as a USAF organization, supporting air refueling and air mobility missions worldwide.

== History ==
=== Early history ===
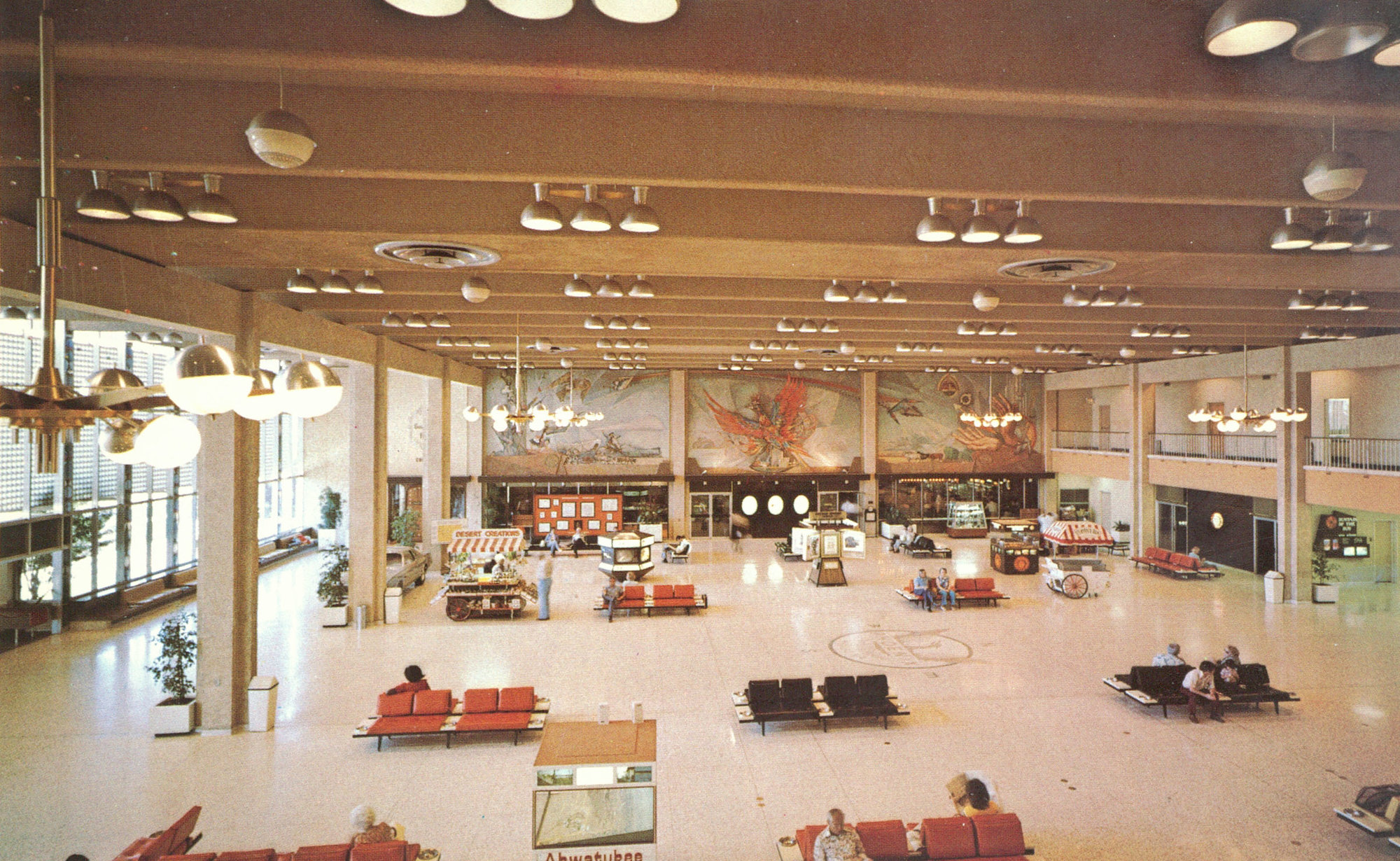
Interior of Terminal 2 in the 1960s with a view of Paul Coze's mural The Phoenix

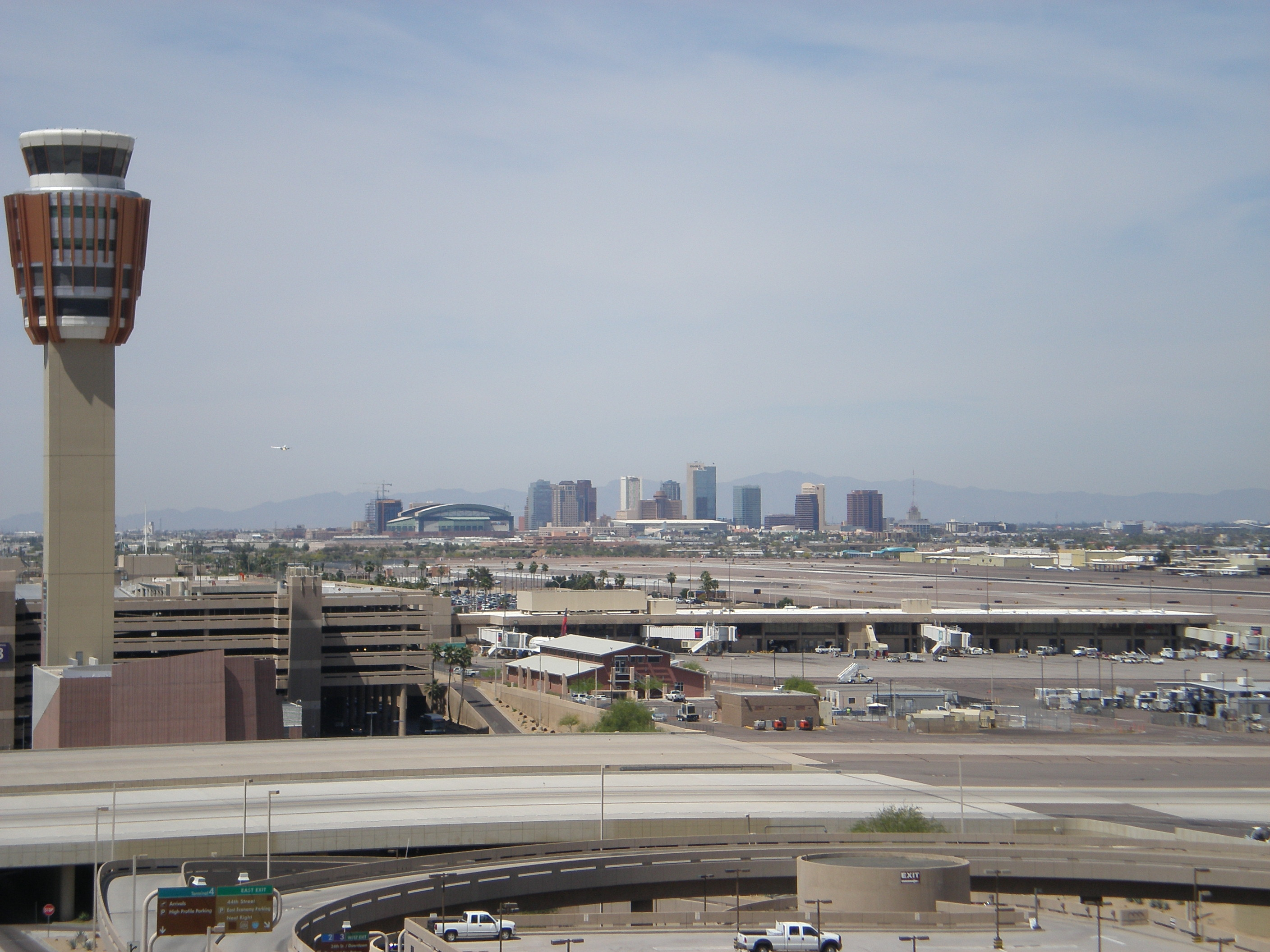
Sky Harbor's Control Tower with downtown Phoenix in the distance

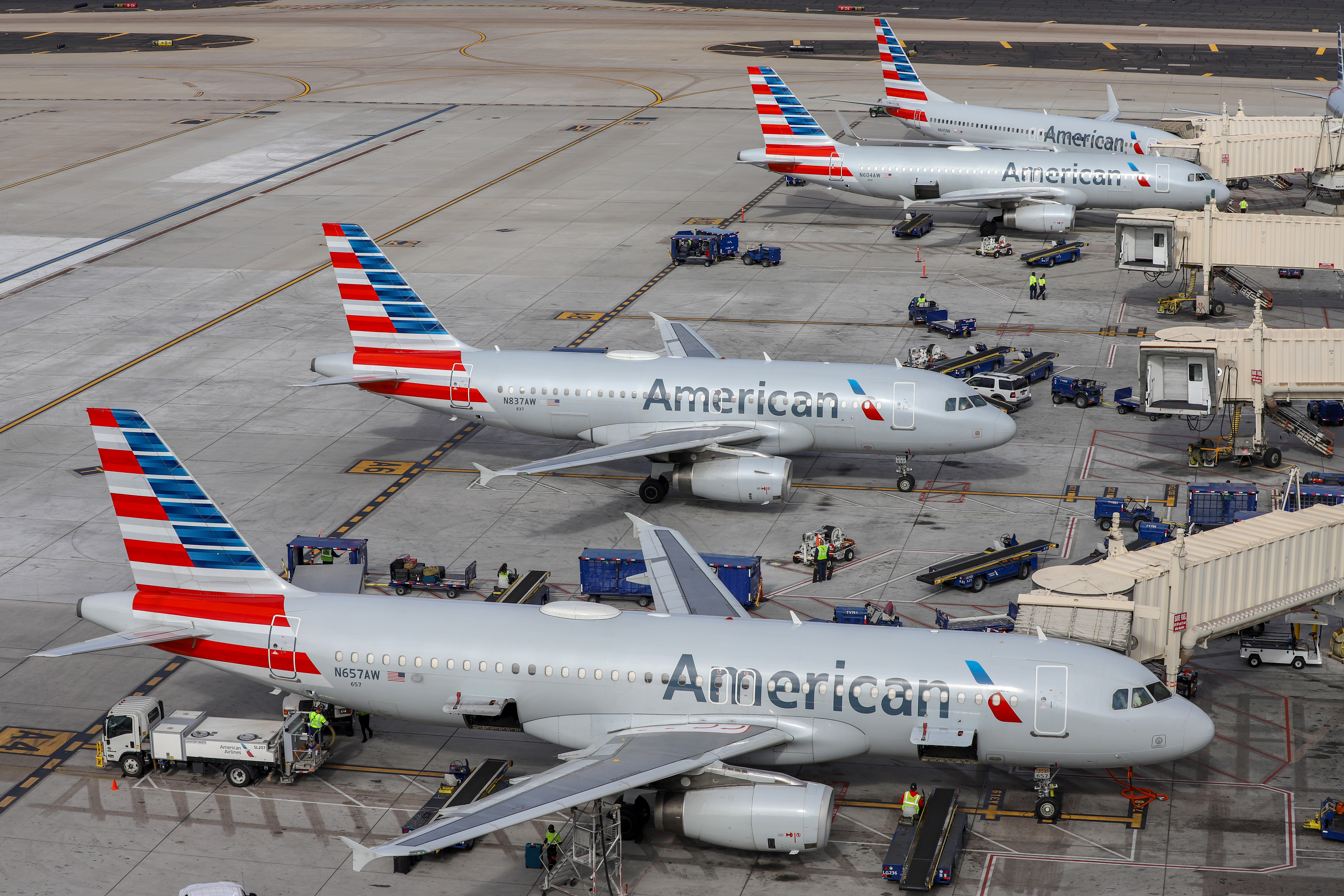
American Airlines aircraft at Terminal 4

Sky Harbor Airport's evocative name was conceived by J. Parker Van Zandt, the owner of Scenic Airways, who purchased 278 acres of farmland for Scenic's winter operations in November 1928. Sky Harbor was not only named but founded and built by Van Zandt in late 1928. He immediately commenced building a 100 x 120 foot airplane hangar and through early 1929 built one runway. This was the fourth airport built in Phoenix. Scenic Airways, lacking funds after the infamous Stock Market Crash of 1929, sold the airport to Acme Investment Company, which owned the airport until 1935, when the city of Phoenix purchased Sky Harbor airport from Acme for $100,000.

=== Historical airline service ===
On February 23, 1929, Maddux Air Lines began the airport's first scheduled passenger service with a route between San Francisco and El Paso stopping in Phoenix, Los Angeles, and several other cities; however the service was short-lived, ending by autumn 1929. Standard Air Lines had been serving Phoenix since late 1927 at a different airport and began landing at Sky Harbor on August 5, 1929. Standard operated a route between Los Angeles and El Paso stopping at Phoenix, Tucson, and Douglas, Arizona. Standard was acquired by American Airways in 1930 which later became American Airlines. American extended the route eastward to New York by way of Dallas, Nashville, and many other cities making for a southern transcontinental route across the United States.

TWA began service to San Francisco in 1938 and added Phoenix onto its transcontinental network by 1944 with flights to Los Angeles and eastward to New York stopping at Albuquerque, Kansas City, and many more cities. Arizona Airways began intrastate service within Arizona in 1946 and merged into Frontier Airlines in 1950 which added new routes to Denver, Albuquerque, and El Paso. Bonanza Airlines began service by 1951 with a route to Las Vegas and Reno making several stops at smaller communities. New routes to Salt Lake City and Southern California were added in the 1960s along with nonstop flights to Las Vegas and Reno aboard Douglas DC-9 jets by 1965. Bonanza merged with two other carriers to become Air West in 1968 and was changed to Hughes Airwest in 1970 adding several new routes, including service to Mexico, creating a hub at Phoenix. Hughes Airwest was then merged into Republic Airlines in 1980 which continued the Phoenix hub operation until the mid-1980s. Western Airlines came to Sky Harbor in 1957 with flights to Denver, Los Angeles and San Diego, Continental Airlines came in 1961 to El Paso, Los Angeles, and Tucson, and Delta Air Lines began flights to Dallas by 1969.

Bonanza Air Lines moved its headquarters from Las Vegas to Phoenix in 1966. Bonanza merged with two other airlines to form Air West, which became Hughes Airwest after Howard Hughes bought it in 1970.

After the Airline Deregulation Act was signed in 1978, many new airlines began service to Sky Harbor. In 1978, former Hughes Airwest executive Ed Beauvais formed a plan for a new airline based in Phoenix. He founded America West Airlines in 1981, which began service from Phoenix in 1983 and doubled in size during its first year. Allegheny Airlines and Eastern Airlines soon began service in 1979 followed by United Airlines in 1980. Allegheny changed its name to USAir shortly after beginning service in 1979. Southwest Airlines arrived at Phoenix in January 1982 with 13 daily flights to 12 cities; by 1986 it had 64 daily flights from Phoenix and had a crew base there. Southwest opened a maintenance facility at PHX in 1992, which was its largest.

America West filed for Chapter 11 bankruptcy protection in 1991 and sold its larger aircraft and Japanese route authority, but continued growing its domestic operations from Terminal 4 in cooperation with Continental Airlines. Although AWA enjoyed further growth at Phoenix during the 1990s the aftermath of the September 11 attacks strained its financial position. AWA ended its relationship with Continental and merged with US Airways in 2005. US Airways moved its headquarters to the AWA campus in Tempe and retained many AWA managers to run the merged company. US Airways was then merged into American Airlines in 2015 which continues to build upon the largest hub operation at Phoenix Sky Harbor.

Sky Harbor landed its first transatlantic flights in 1996 when British Airways inaugurated nonstop service to London. The flight was first operated with a Douglas DC-10 aircraft but soon upgraded to a Boeing 747-400.

In May 2025, Starlux Airlines announced they would launch service in 2026 to Taipei, Taiwan, on an Airbus A350 aircraft, marking the first time an airline announced nonstop service to Asia from the airport. On July 25, 2025, China Airlines announced that it will start nonstop flights to Taipei, starting in December of that year.

=== Facilities expansions and growth ===
After World War II, the airport began work on a new passenger terminal, as well as a new parallel runway and a diagonal runway. On the February 1953 C&GS diagram runways 8L and 8R are each 6,000 feet (1,800 m) long and runway 3 is 5,500 feet (1,700 m). The $835,000 Terminal 1 (originally called the West Wing), which also had the first control tower, opened in October 1952.

The airport's master plan was redesigned in 1959 to eliminate the cross runway to make room for new terminals. American and TWA began jet service to Phoenix in 1960 and 1961 respectively, and Terminal 2 (originally called the East Wing) opened in 1962. Terminal 2 was designed by the Phoenix architectural firms of Weaver & Drover and Lescher & Mahoney and opened in 1962. Terminal 2 also featured a 16-foot (4.9 m) high and 75-foot (23 m) wide mural composed of 52 different materials, including mosaic glass, gemstones, shells, and vintage toys.

The Phoenix, designed by the late French-American artist and full-time resident of Phoenix Paul Coze, was commissioned in 1960 as Phoenix's first work of public art and was installed in 1962 in the main lobby area of the terminal. The Phoenix was relocated to the Rental Car Center in 2021 following the decommissioning and demolition of Terminal 2. In November 2006, a Military and Veterans Hospitality Room, sponsored by the Phoenix Military and Veterans Commission, was opened in Terminal 2. It has since relocated to Terminal 4 as the new USO club. This terminal underwent two renovation projects. The first was completed in 1988. The second project, which cost $24 million and was designed by DWL Architects + Planners, Inc., was completed in 2007.

Construction on Terminal 3 began in January 1977. Designed by DWL Architects + Planners, Inc., Terminal 3 opened in October 1979, and the "East" and "West" names were dropped since there were no longer only two terminals.

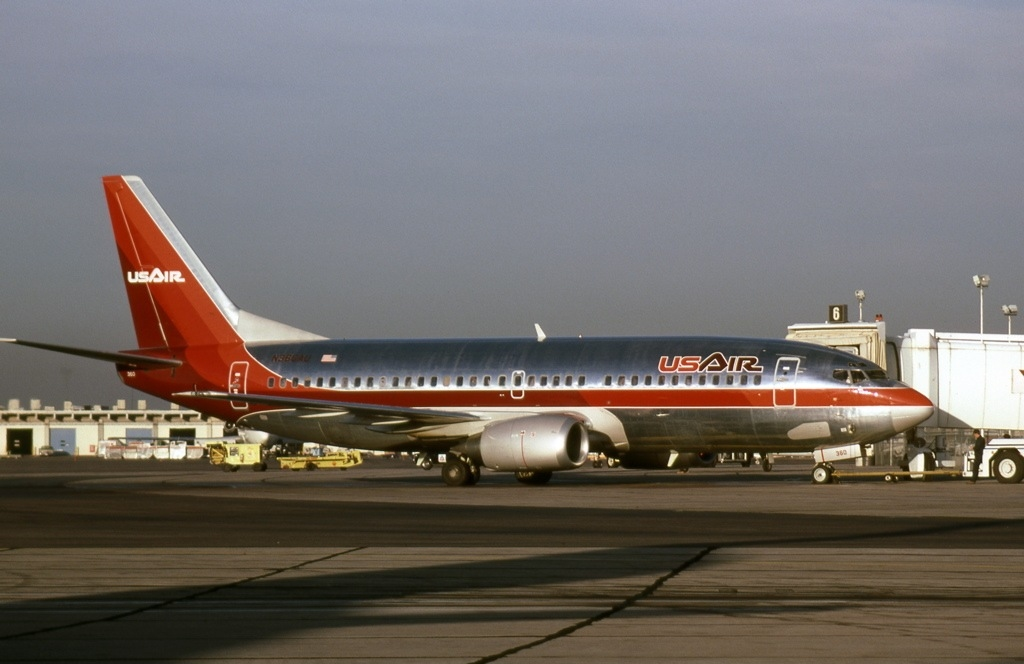
A USAir Boeing 737-300 at Phoenix Sky Harbor International Airport on February 28, 1986. This aircraft, N360AU, would later be re-registered as N388US, and would go on to crash at Los Angeles in 1991 as Flight 1493

In October 1989, ground was broken for Terminal 4, the largest terminal. It opened on November 2, 1990, with four concourses: N2 and N3 on the north side and S3 and S4 on the south side. In 1994 the N4 International Concourse was opened, adding 10 gates and a sterile walkway to the S4 concourse. In 1997 construction began on the 14-gate N1 concourse for America West Airlines. It was completed in June 1998 at a cost of $50 million, completing the expansion of the north side of the terminal. On the south side of the terminal, construction began in 2002 on the eight-gate S2 concourse for Southwest Airlines. This project was completed in 2004 and has a different architectural design from the other six concourses. The eighth and final concourse for Terminal 4, S1 (South 1), with gates D11–D18, began construction in May 2019. Terminal 4 is named after former Arizona Senator and 1964 Presidential candidate Barry M. Goldwater. After Goldwater's death in 1998, the then-mayor of Phoenix, Skip Rimsza, proposed renaming the airport in Goldwater's memory but was deluged with public support for the familiar "Sky Harbor" name. Terminal 4, designed by DWL Architects + Planners, Inc., is the largest and busiest of the two terminals with 86 (now 92) gates, divided into eight satellite concourses connected behind security.

In 2007, the Transportation Security Administration introduced the first of its backscatter X-ray machines at PHX.

=== Recent developments ===
In February 2020, Terminal 2 accepted its final flight and was then decommissioned. Demolition occurred in early 2021 with the terminal being replaced by concrete stands for aircraft, accessible by bus from other terminals. Airlines previously using Terminal 2 were relocated to Terminal 3, which had completed renovations in January 2020.

Terminal 3, N2 concourse under construction at Phoenix Sky Harbor in August 2026.

In January 2021, Terminal 3 was renamed in honor of Senator John McCain by the Phoenix City Council.

In February 2024, the airport announced plans for infrastructure upgrades at its central utility plant in Terminal 4, which will improve air conditioning at the airport. The $36 million project was funded by a FAA Airport Terminal Program grant included in the federal Infrastructure Investment and Jobs Act that was signed into law by then-President Joe Biden.

On April 29, 2024, Phoenix Mayor Kate Gallego announced that a new terminal would be constructed on the west end of the property near the former location of Terminal 2. She said that in 2023 the airport welcomed more than 48 million passengers and with continued growth expected the new terminal was needed to accommodate growing demand and handle the increased number of travelers. The terminal would feature a new customs facility and would be designed to have net-zero greenhouse gas emissions, making it an environmentally friendly structure. The terminal is expected to break ground in 2029 and open in 2033.

In 2024, the airport surpassed 50 million passengers in a single calendar year, an all-time record for the facility.

In March 2026, 5,128,429 passengers passed through the airport, which was the busiest month in PHX history. On March 8th, 86,250 passengers were screened at PHX, the most ever in one day.

== Facilities ==
=== Terminals ===
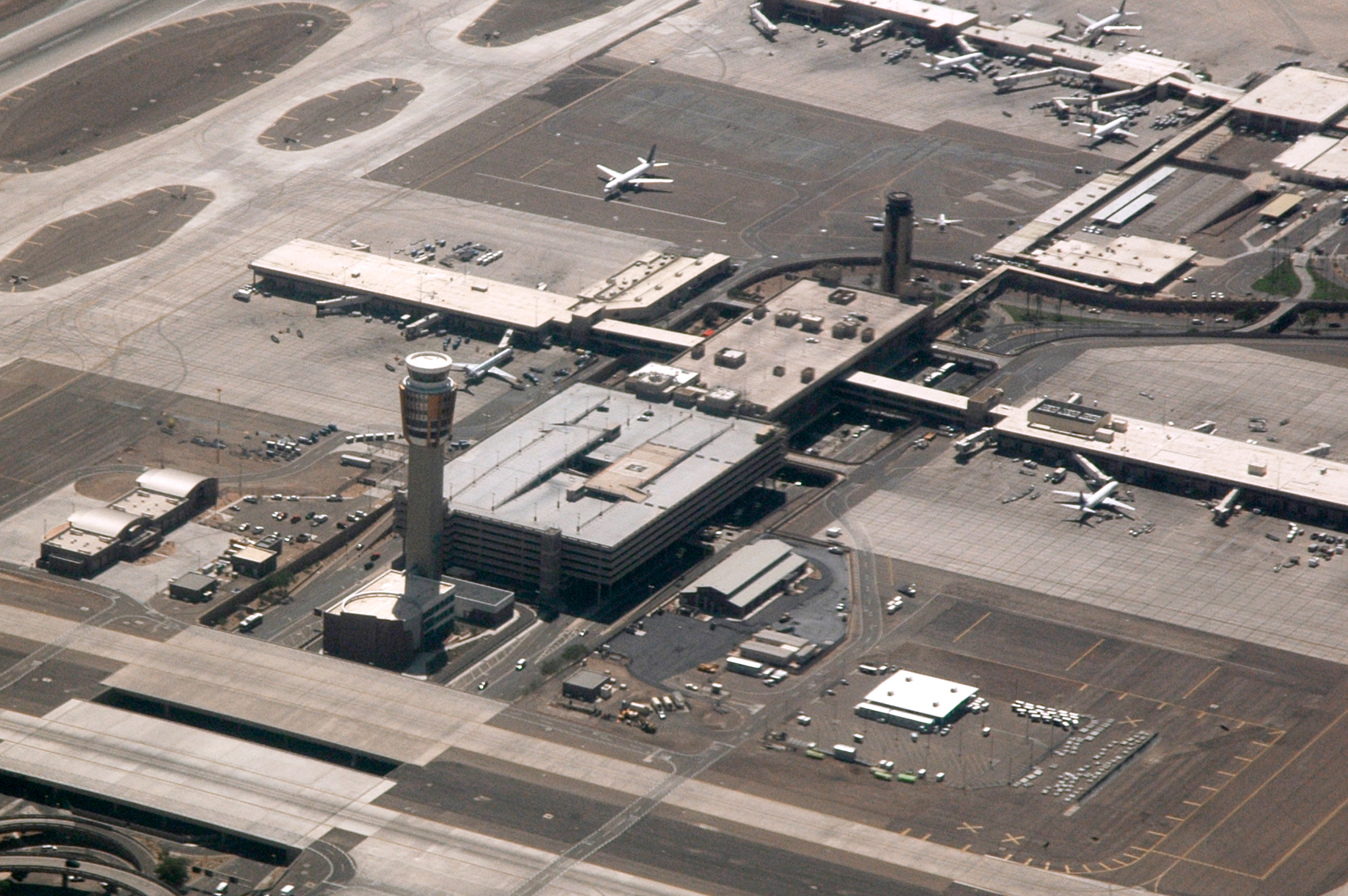
Aerial view of the new control tower in the foreground, and the old control tower in the background, with Terminal 3 in between, looking southwest

The airport has 119 active aircraft gates in two Terminals (3 and 4). The airport administration states that the designations Terminal 1 and Terminal 2 have been "retired" and that it did not wish to renumber the other terminals since passengers were already familiar with the numbers in place. Terminals 3 and 4 continued to retain their numbers after the closing of Terminal 2. Bus gates are planned to be operated on the Terminal 2 site. Terminal 3 is used by most domestic or precleared arrivals including Alaska Airlines, Delta Air Lines, Frontier Airlines, and United Airlines. International carriers, American Airlines and Southwest Airlines operate in Terminal 4.

- Terminal 3 contains 27 gates.
- Terminal 4 contains 92 gates.

=== Runways ===
PHX covers 3,400 acres (14 km^{2}) at an elevation of 1,135 ft (346 m). The airport has three parallel concrete/grooved runways:

- Runway 8/26 measuring 11,489 ft × 150 ft (3,502 m × 46 m)
- Runway 7L/25R measuring 10,300 ft × 150 ft (3,139 m × 46 m)
- Runway 7R/25L measuring 7,800 ft × 150 ft (2,377 m × 46 m)

All three runways can accommodate aircraft with a maximum takeoff weight of 900,000 lb (410,000 kg) or greater.

Sky Harbor's private airplane area is also one of eight service centers for the Medevac airline Air Evac.

=== ATC tower ===
The airport's 326-foot-tall (99 m) air traffic control tower began operations on January 14, 2007. It stands just east of the Terminal 3 parking garage and also houses the Phoenix TRACON. This is Sky Harbor's third control tower and is among the tallest control towers in North America.

=== Museum ===
The Phoenix Airport Museum is a museum displaying artwork and local aviation memorabilia located inside both Terminal 3 and 4.

== Airlines and destinations ==
=== Passenger ===
The following airlines operate regularly scheduled passenger flights at Sky Harbor Airport:

Airlines	Destinations
Advanced Air	Gallup, Imperial/El Centro, Silver City
Aeroméxico	Mexico City–Benito Juárez
Air Canada	Vancouver; Seasonal: Montréal–Trudeau, Toronto–Pearson
Air Canada Express	Seasonal: Vancouver
Air Canada Rouge	Montréal–Trudeau, Toronto–Pearson
Air France	Paris–Charles de Gaulle
Alaska Airlines	Anchorage, Boise, Everett, Portland (OR), San Diego, Seattle/Tacoma; Seasonal: Santa Rosa
Allegiant Air	Asheville, Knoxville, Pittsburgh, Stockton
American Airlines	Albuquerque, Atlanta, Austin, Bakersfield, Boston, Cancún, Charlotte, Chicago–O'Hare, Cincinnati, Cleveland, Columbus–Glenn, Dallas/Fort Worth, Denver, Des Moines, Detroit, Eugene, Fort Lauderdale, Fresno, Honolulu, Houston–Intercontinental, Indianapolis, Jacksonville (FL), Kahului, Kailua-Kona, Kansas City, Las Vegas, Lihue, Los Angeles, Madison, Mazatlán, Memphis, Mexico City–Benito Juárez, Miami, Milwaukee, Minneapolis/St. Paul, Nashville, New Orleans, New York–JFK, Newark, Omaha, Ontario, Orange County, Orlando, Palm Springs, Philadelphia, Pittsburgh, Portland (OR), Puerto Vallarta, Raleigh/Durham, Reno/Tahoe, Sacramento, Salt Lake City, San Antonio, San Diego, San Francisco, San Jose (CA), San José del Cabo, Spokane, St. Louis, Tampa, Washington–National; Seasonal: Anchorage, Boise, Burbank, El Paso, Fayetteville/Bentonville, Fort Myers, Grand Rapids, London–Heathrow, Monterey, San Luis Obispo, Santa Barbara, Santa Rosa, Seattle/Tacoma, Tucson
American Eagle	Abilene, Albuquerque, Bakersfield, Boise, Burbank, Cedar Rapids/Iowa City, Des Moines, Durango (CO), El Paso, Eugene, Fayetteville/Bentonville, Flagstaff, Fresno, Grand Junction, Guadalajara, Hermosillo, Houston–Intercontinental, Ixtapa/Zihuatanejo, Kansas City, Little Rock, Loreto, Lubbock, Mazatlán, McAllen, Medford, Memphis, Midland/Odessa, Monterey, Monterrey (ends December 1, 2026), Oklahoma City, Omaha, Ontario, Palm Springs, Provo, Redmond/Bend, Reno/Tahoe, Sacramento, Salt Lake City, San Diego/Carlsbad, San Francisco, San Jose (CA), San Luis Obispo, Santa Barbara, Santa Fe, Santa Rosa, Seattle/Tacoma, Sioux Falls, St. George (UT), St. Louis, Tri-Cities (WA), Tucson, Tulsa, Wichita, Yuma; Seasonal: Appleton, Aspen, Billings, Bozeman, Denver, Eagle/Vail, Fargo, Glacier Park/Kalispell, Idaho Falls, Manzanillo, Portland (OR), Rapid City, Springfield/Branson, Sun Valley
Breeze Airways	Provo; Seasonal: Hartford, New Orleans (begins February 1, 2027), Norfolk, Richmond
British Airways	London–Heathrow
China Airlines	Taipei–Taoyuan
Contour Airlines	Page, Show Low, Vernal
Delta Air Lines	Atlanta, Boston, Detroit, Minneapolis/St. Paul, New York–JFK, Salt Lake City, Seattle/Tacoma
Delta Connection	Austin, Los Angeles
Denver Air Connection	Cortez, Telluride (CO)
Frontier Airlines	Atlanta, Austin, Chicago–O'Hare, Cleveland, Dallas/Fort Worth, Denver, Detroit, Houston–Intercontinental, Las Vegas, Los Angeles, Minneapolis/St. Paul, Orange County, Salt Lake City, San Antonio, San Diego, San Francisco, Seasonal: Des Moines, Orlando
Hawaiian Airlines	Honolulu
JetBlue	New York–JFK; Seasonal: Boston, Fort Lauderdale
Lufthansa	Munich (begins August 3, 2027)
Porter Airlines	Toronto–Pearson; Seasonal: Calgary (begins December 20, 2026), Edmonton, Vancouver
Southwest Airlines	Albuquerque, Atlanta, Austin, Baltimore, Birmingham (AL), Boise, Burbank, Cancún, Chicago–Midway, Cleveland, Colorado Springs, Columbus–Glenn, Dallas–Love, Denver, Des Moines, El Paso, Honolulu, Houston–Hobby, Indianapolis, Kahului, Kansas City, Las Vegas, Long Beach, Los Angeles, Louisville, Milwaukee, Nashville, New Orleans, Oakland, Oklahoma City, Omaha, Ontario, Orange County, Orlando, Pittsburgh, Portland (OR), Puerto Vallarta, Raleigh/Durham, Reno/Tahoe, Sacramento, Salt Lake City, San Antonio, San Diego, San Francisco, San Jose (CA), San José del Cabo, Seattle/Tacoma, Spokane, St. Louis, Tampa, Tucson, Tulsa; Seasonal: Buffalo, Cincinnati, Detroit, Fort Lauderdale, Little Rock, Memphis, Minneapolis/St. Paul, Wichita
Starlux Airlines	Taipei–Taoyuan
Sun Country Airlines	Minneapolis/St. Paul; Seasonal: Madison, Milwaukee
United Airlines	Chicago–O'Hare, Denver, Houston–Intercontinental, Los Angeles, Newark, San Francisco, Washington–Dulles
United Express	Los Angeles
Volaris	Culiacán, Guadalajara
WestJet	Calgary, Edmonton; Seasonal: Kelowna, Regina, Saskatoon, Winnipeg

=== Cargo ===
Airlines	Destinations	Refs
Ameriflight	Albuquerque, Hermosillo, Lake Havasu, Nogales (US), Payson, Prescott, Sierra Vista, Show Low, Tucson, Yuma	
DHL Aviation	Albuquerque, Cincinnati, Hermosillo, Los Angeles, Reno/Tahoe, San Diego, Tucson	
UPS Airlines	Albuquerque, Chicago/Rockford, Dallas/Fort Worth, Denver, Louisville, Lubbock, Ontario, Salt Lake City	

== Statistics ==
=== Airline market share ===
Largest airlines at PHX (September 2025 – August 2026)
Rank	Airline	Passengers	Share
1	American Airlines	20,625,880	40.7%
2	Southwest Airlines	16,751,847	33.1%
3	Delta Air Lines	3,505,851	6.9%
4	United Airlines	3,064,556	6.1%
5	Frontier Airlines	2,381,245	4.7%
-	Other*	4,300,000	8.5%

*Includes flights operated by American Eagle, Delta Connection, and United Express partner airlines. The specific airline total passenger numbers only include mainline operations.

=== Top destinations ===
Busiest domestic routes from PHX (September 2025 – August 2026)
Rank	City	Passengers	Carriers
1	Denver, Colorado	1,207,997	American, Frontier, Southwest, United
2	Seattle/Tacoma, Washington	900,811	Alaska, American, Delta, Frontier, Southwest
3	Chicago–O'Hare, Illinois	848,310	American, Frontier, Southwest, United
4	Dallas/Fort Worth, Texas	812,648	American, Frontier
5	Los Angeles, California	787,073	American, Delta, Frontier, Southwest, United
6	San Diego, California	737,711	Alaska, American, Frontier, Southwest
7	Las Vegas, Nevada	735,514	American, Frontier, Southwest
8	Salt Lake City, Utah	630,219	American, Delta, Frontier, Southwest
9	Atlanta, Georgia	614,034	American, Delta, Frontier, Southwest
10	San Francisco, California	610,439	American, Frontier, Southwest, United

Busiest international routes from PHX (September 2025 – August 2026)
Rank	City	Passengers	Carriers
1	San José del Cabo, Mexico	369,498	American, Southwest
2	London–Heathrow, United Kingdom	305,723	American, British Airways
3	Calgary, Canada	248,688	WestJet
4	Puerto Vallarta, Mexico	245,442	American, Southwest
5	Cancún, Mexico	209,563	American, Southwest
6	Mexico City–Benito Juárez, Mexico	191,011	Aeroméxico, American Airlines
7	Guadalajara, Mexico	176,730	Volaris
8	Toronto–Pearson, Canada	161,089	Air Canada Rogue, Porter
9	Vancouver, Canada	157,470	Air Canada, Porter, Westjet
10	Paris–Charles de Gaulle, France	100,792	Air France

=== Annual traffic ===
Annual passenger traffic (enplaned + deplaned) at PHX, (1951–present)
Year	Passengers	Year	Passengers	Year	Passengers	Year	Passengers
1951	240,786	1971	3,000,707	1991	22,140,437	2011	40,592,295
1952	296,066	1972	3,365,122	1992	22,118,399	2012	40,448,932
1953	325,311	1973	3,776,725	1993	23,621,781	2013	40,341,614
1954	365,545	1974	3,962,988	1994	25,626,132	2014	42,134,662
1955	442,587	1975	3,964,942	1995	27,856,195	2015	44,003,840
1956	495,268	1976	4,414,625	1996	30,411,852	2016	43,411,591
1957	581,087	1977	4,984,653	1997	30,667,210	2017	43,921,670
1958	658,889	1978	5,931,860	1998	31,769,113	2018	44,943,686
1959	783,115	1979	7,021,985	1999	33,472,916	2019	46,288,337
1960	857,318	1980	6,585,854	2000	36,044,281	2020	21,928,708
1961	920,096	1981	6,641,750	2001	35,437,051	2021	38,846,713
1962	1,090,953	1982	7,491,516	2002	35,547,432	2022	44,397,854
1963	1,247,684	1983	8,605,408	2003	37,423,596	2023	48,654,432
1964	1,411,912	1984	10,801,658	2004	39,504,323	2024	52,325,266
1965	1,594,895	1985	13,422,764	2005	41,215,342	2025	51,618,649
1966	1,943,336	1986	15,556,994	2006	41,436,498	2026	
1967	2,236,637	1987	17,723,046	2007	42,184,515	2027	
1968	2,515,326	1988	19,178,100	2008	39,891,193	2028	
1969	2,795,212	1989	20,714,059	2009	37,824,982	2029	
1970	2,871,958	1990	21,718,068	2010	38,554,530	2030	

- From 1951 through the end of 2025 (75 years), 1,529,152,832 passengers (domestic and international, enplaned and deplaned) have transited through PHX, an annual average of 20,388,704 passengers per year. In the same time frame there were 30,520,423 million aircraft movements (commercial, military, general aviation) at PHX, an annual average of 406,939 movements per year. PHX has grown over the years into a major US hub, and in 2025 was ranked the 39th-busiest airport in the world and 11th-busiest airport in the United States in passenger boardings.

== Ground transportation ==
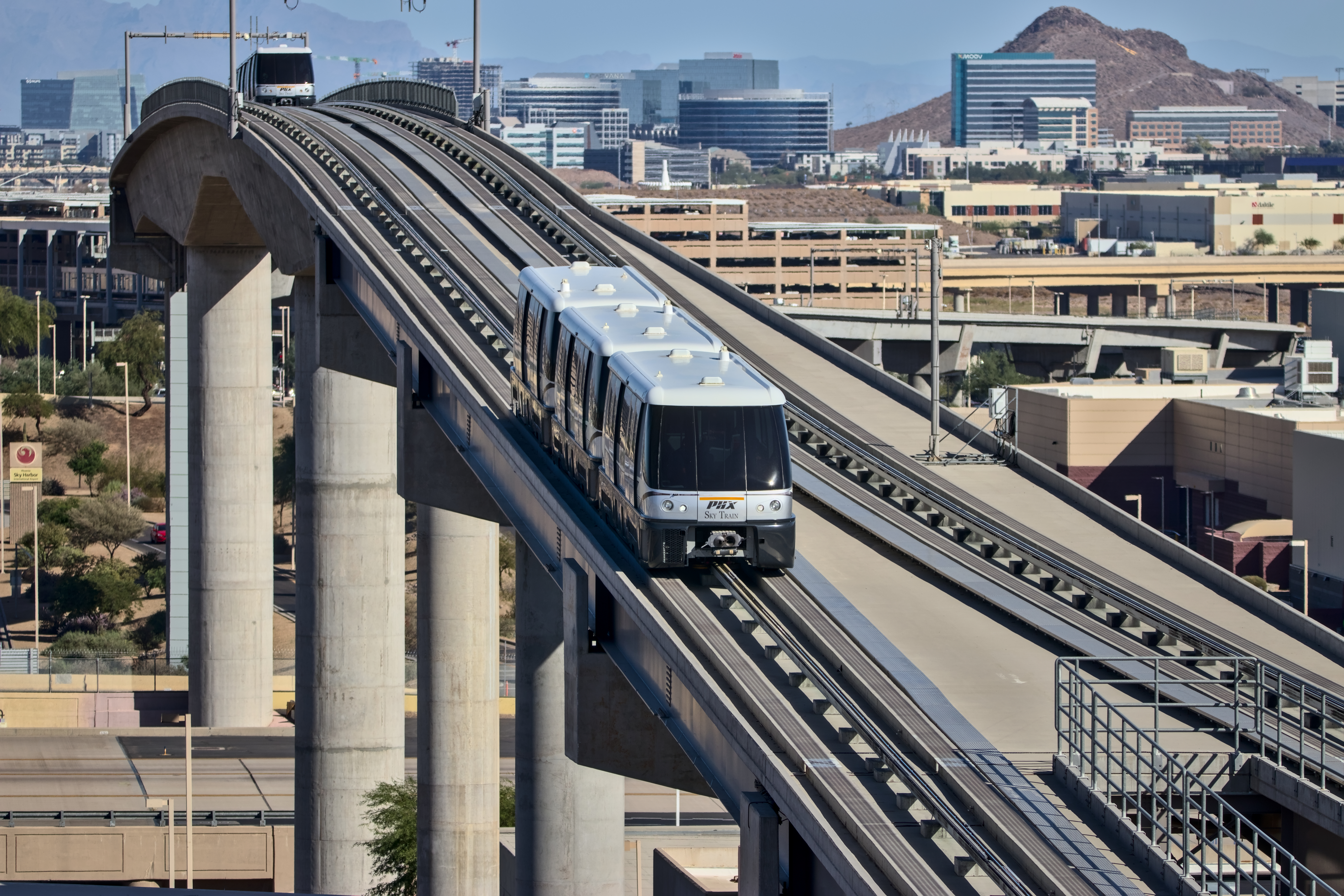
PHX Sky Train

Travelers can access both terminals from the East Economy Parking by using the PHX Sky Train. There is also terminal parking adjacent to each terminal. The PHX Sky Train project is complete, connecting terminals to the Rental Car Center.

Valley Metro bus route 13 has a stop at the 24th St. Sky Train station Travelers connecting to or from the Greyhound station can walk from the 24th St. Sky Train Station. The Valley Metro Rail has a stop at the nearby 44th St/Washington light rail station. A moving sidewalk bridge over Washington Street allows light rail passengers to arrive at the nearby PHX Sky Train station and then onward to stations at the East Economy Parking Lot and Terminals 3 and 4. Valley Metro bus routes 44 serve the PHX Sky Train station at 44th Street and Washington.

A number of taxi, limousine, ride share and shuttle companies provide service between each airport terminal, the Phoenix metropolitan area, and other communities throughout the state.

By road, the airport terminals are served by East Sky Harbor Boulevard, which is fed by Interstate 10, Arizona State Routes 143 and 202.

=== PHX Sky Train ===
The PHX Sky Train is an automated people-mover, much like those found at other airports, that transports Sky Harbor passengers from the 44th Street and Washington Light Rail station to Sky Harbor's East Economy Parking lot, through both terminals. Phase 1 opened on April 8, 2013, and runs from the 44th Street and Washington Light Rail station, to East Economy Parking and on to Terminal 4. Phase 1A shuttles passengers to Terminal 3. Phase 1A opened on December 8, 2014. Phase 2 transports passengers to the Rental Car Center. Phase 2 opened on December 20, 2022.

== Reception ==
In its 2019 airport rankings, The Wall Street Journal ranked Sky Harbor as the best airport overall among the 20 largest airports in the U.S. "Phoenix excelled in several of the 15 categories, with short screening waits, fast Wi-Fi, good Yelp scores for restaurant reviews, short taxi-to-takeoff times for planes and cheap average Uber cost to get downtown." Sky Harbor won the honor again in 2023, ahead of Minneapolis–Saint Paul International Airport and Los Angeles International Airport.

== Accidents and incidents ==
- On February 3, 1966, a PV-2 Harpoon reg.N7258C owned by Delta Arrow Co. was completing a flight from Marana, Arizona to PHX and was on final approach to the airport. While in the vicinity of the airfield, the pilot did not inform ATC about an engine fire and attempted an emergency landing when control was lost. The aircraft crashed into a residential area just west of the airport. The aircraft and three homes were destroyed and another was damaged. Both the pilot and his wife perished in the crash as well as a 2 year old boy in one of the homes. There were 7 minor injuries.
- On June 27, 1969, a Cessna 182 Skylane, reg.N3150Y flying from Hawthorne Airport in Hawthorne, California, to Sky Harbor, hit high-tension power lines east of the airport and crashed at 10:48 pm in the Salt River bed while attempting to land on Runway 26R, knocking out power to the airport and killing all three passengers on board.
- On March 9, 1973, a Golden West Airlines HFB 320 Hansa Jet reg.N320MC experienced a belly landing sliding for several dozen yards and came to rest in flames because the crew failed to use the checklist and forgot to extend the landing gear. All 2 crew and 7 passengers escaped uninjured but the aircraft was destroyed.
- On September 27, 1974, a privately owned Cessna 340 reg. N9950F experienced a right engine failure on final approach to PHX airport. Control was lost, the aircraft struck power lines and crashed into a house, the plane bursting into flames. The sole occupant, the pilot was killed. There were no other injuries or fatalities..
- On May 29, 1979, An Aero Commander 680 reg.N783EF operated by Combs Freightair on final approach experienced dual engine and crashed short of the runway threshold, seriously injuring both pilots. The aircraft was damaged beyond repair and written off.
- On March 13, 1990, an Alaska Airlines Boeing 727 taking off from PHX struck and killed a male who breached security and ran onto the runway. There were no injuries on the 727. Airport authorities determined he was a patient at a nearby mental hospital.
- On November 7, 1992, a privately owned North American Sabreliner reg.N169RF crash-landed at PHX because of the delay of the PIC to apply normal braking and his failure to execute appropriate emergency procedures. There was an antiskid malfunction and the co-pilot's inexperience in the aircraft along with inadequate crew coordination were also factors in the accident. All 8 occupants survived but the aircraft was destroyed.
- On August 28, 2002, America West Airlines Flight 794, an Airbus 320-231 reg.N635AW upon landing at PHX veered off the runway because of asymmetrical thrust, collapsing the nose gear and damaging the forward fuselage. All 159 passengers and crew survived with just 1 serious injury and 9 minor injuries. The aircraft was substantially damaged and was written off in 2003.

=== 2024 Christmas Day Violence ===
On December 25, 2024, an apparent family dispute among a group of five at a restaurant in Terminal 4 escalated into a shooting and stabbing, leaving three with gunshot wounds and another with a stab wound. A man and a juvenile female were detained as a result of the incident. After the domestic incident, a man allegedly responding to false reports of an active shooter at the airport arrived at the airport shirtless and armed. The man had an altercation with police before he was also arrested.

== See also ==
- Phoenix–Mesa Gateway Airport
- List of airports in Arizona
- List of tallest air traffic control towers in the United States
